= U.S. Route 6 in Iowa =

Section of U.S. Highway in Iowa

U.S. Highway 6
- Grand Army of the Republic Highway
- US 6 highlighted in red

Route information
- Maintained by Iowa DOT
- Length: 322.454 mi (518.939 km)
- Existed: June 8, 1931–present

Major junctions
- West end: I-480 / US 6 at Omaha, NE
- I-29 in Council Bluffs; I-80 / US 71 near Atlantic; I-80 / US 169 at De Soto; I-35 / I-80 in Clive; I-235 in Des Moines; I-80 / US 65 in Altoona; I-80 / Iowa 14 in Newton; US 151 at the Amana Colonies; I-80 / Iowa 38 near Wilton; I-280 / US 61 at Davenport
- East end: I-74 / US 6 at Moline, IL

Location
- Country: United States
- State: Iowa
- Counties: Pottawattamie; Cass; Adair; Madison; Dallas; Polk; Jasper; Poweshiek; Iowa; Johnson; Muscatine; Cedar; Scott

Highway system
- United States Numbered Highway System; List; Special; Divided; Iowa Primary Highway System; Interstate; US; State; Secondary; Scenic
← Iowa 5	→ Iowa 7
← Iowa 31	US 32	→ Iowa 32

U.S. Highway 6 (US 6) is an east–west United States Numbered Highway which runs 322 miles (518 km) across the U.S. state of Iowa. The route is signed in places as the Grand Army of the Republic Highway. Like all state highways in Iowa, it is maintained by the Iowa Department of Transportation (Iowa DOT). The route begins at the Missouri River crossing at Council Bluffs. From there, it travels east through Oakland and Atlantic. North of Atlantic, the highway overlaps Interstate 80 (I-80) until De Soto. Between De Soto and Adel, the highway overlaps US 169 before splitting off to the east toward Des Moines. Through the Des Moines area, the highway runs about one mile (1.6 km) north or south of the I-35/I-80 corridor.

At Altoona, the route again overlaps I-80 until Newton, where it splits away from I-80. The highway passes near or through the cities of Kellogg, Grinnell, Victor, Marengo, the Amana Colonies, and Tiffin before entering the Iowa City metropolitan area. Through Coralville and Iowa City, US 6 has no direct access to I-80, I-380, or US 218; other routes like Iowa Highway 1 (Iowa 1) and Iowa 965 provide direct access. From Iowa City, the highway heads to the east-southeast through West Liberty and Atalissa. Near Wilton, the route heads north to I-80 where it again overlaps to Davenport. At Davenport, US 6 then follows I-280 and US 61 before entering the city. On the eastern side of Davenport, it joins I-74 and enters Bettendorf before leaving Iowa for Illinois.

Dating back to 1910, the route US 6 follows was originally the Great White Way and River-to-River Road. Both were auto trails which connected Council Bluffs and Davenport. When the U.S. Numbered Highway System was created in 1926, the highway was designated U.S. Highway 32 (US 32). US 32 was renumbered in 1931 as US 6 was extended to the west coast. As the Interstate Highway System expanded in the 1950–1970s, US 6's importance as a cross-state route was diminished by I-80. As a result, the least-traveled sections of the route were moved onto I-80 and control of the vacated sections of highway was given to local jurisdictions.

== Route description ==
US 6 is a cross-state route that connects Council Bluffs and Davenport by way of Des Moines and Iowa City. The route parallels I-80 for most of its length; however, nearly one-third of the route overlaps the Interstate Highway. While the route is away from I-80, US 6 is a two-lane highway with a rural speed limit of 55 miles per hour (90 km/h). However, between Adel and Waukee, the roadway is a four-lane divided highway that has a speed limit of 65 mph (105 km/h).

=== Western Iowa ===
US 6 crosses the Missouri River via the Grenville Dodge Memorial Bridge, named after the Union Army general during the U.S. Civil War, into Council Bluffs with I-480. Just three-quarters mile (1,200 m) into the state, I-480 ends at an interchange with I-29. US 6 heads east along I-29 south on the western side of Council Bluffs, then it overlaps I-80 and continues due east. On the east side of Council Bluffs, I-80 and US 6 split. Near Oakland, the highway follows the north–south US 59 for two miles (3.2 km). Near Lewis, the road turns to the north-northeast until it reaches Atlantic. In Atlantic, the route turns back to the east and heads toward downtown where it meets Iowa 83. US 6 / Iowa 83 travel together to the eastern side of Atlantic where they meet US 71. The three routes run together for four miles (6.4 km), when US 6 / US 71 split away from Iowa 83 and continue north to I-80. At I-80, US 6 leaves US 71 and joins I-80. At this point, US 6 begins the first of three instances when its traffic is routed along I-80. In the eastern part of Cass County, the two routes meet the northern end of Iowa 148.

As I-80 and US 6 approach Adair, the highways curve slightly to the south to bypass the community. There are two interchanges in Adair; both of the intersecting roads, at one time or another, carried US 6. County Road G30 (CR G30), the White Pole Road, was the original alignment of US 6, while CR N54 has not carried US 6 since 1980. Further east is an interchange with Iowa 25. About one mile (1.6 km) south of the interchange is Freedom Rock. Each year for Memorial Day, the rock is repainted with a patriotic scene by local artist Ray "Bubba" Sorenson II. Near Dexter, I-80 and US 6 graze the northwestern corner of Madison County. After two miles (3.2 km), the routes enter Dallas County and meet CR F60, another former alignment of US 6. Near the CR F90 / CR P58 interchange, they start heading northeast toward Des Moines. At De Soto, US 6 splits away from I-80 at the interchange with US 169.

=== Central Iowa ===
At De Soto, US 6 turns to the north, overlapping US 169 for five miles (8.0 km) to Adel. East of Adel, US 6 is a four-lane divided highway for 14 miles (23 km), during which it passes through Waukee, Clive, and Urbandale along Hickman Road and intersects I-35 / I-80. Over the next two miles (3.2 km), it serves as the border between Urbandale and Windsor Heights. At 63rd Street in Des Moines, US 6 intersects Iowa 28. For one-half mile (800 m), US 6 / Iowa 28 run together on Hickman Road. Turning north, they run together for another mile (1.6 km) along Merle Hay Road, named after the first Iowa service member in World War I. At Douglas Avenue, US 6 splits away from Iowa 28 and continues east, becoming Euclid Avenue just west of the Des Moines River. In north-central Des Moines, it intersects US 69 and I-235. In northeast Des Moines, it turns to the northeast along Hubbell Avenue, which takes US 6 to Altoona. West of Altoona, it intersects US 65 and continues northeast passing the Adventureland theme park and Prairie Meadows casino. In northwest Altoona, US 6 intersects I-80 and US 65. Here, US 6 rejoins I-80 for the second time. After a third exit for Altoona, the Interstate resumes its 70 mph (115 km/h) rural limit. Near Colfax, the highways cross the South Skunk River. After an interchange with Iowa 117, the highway is forced to the north to avoid crossing the river multiple times. As the roadway returns south to its original line, it meets CR F48, which was another former alignment of US 6.

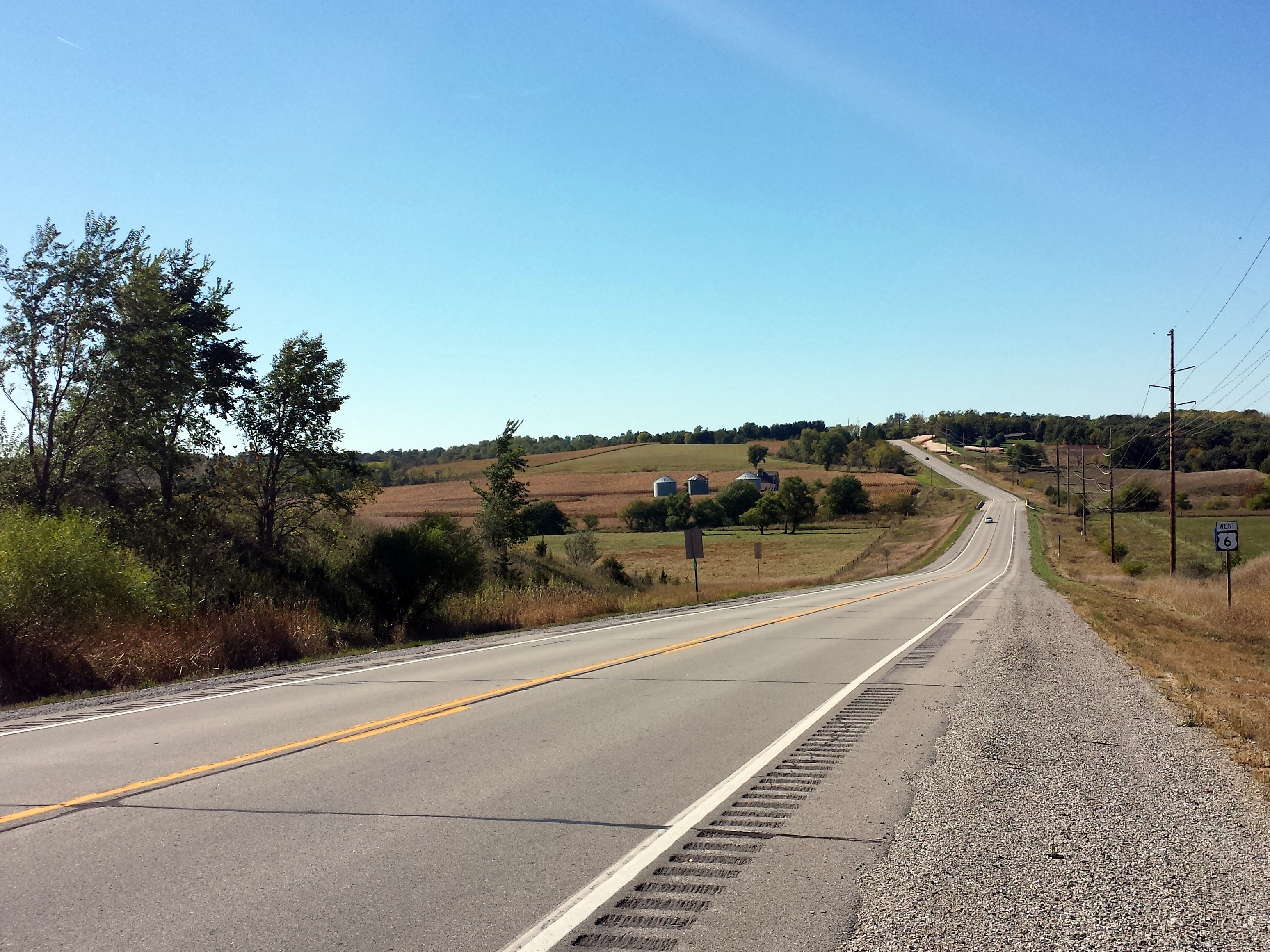
US 6 between Newton and Grinnell

At Newton, US 6 splits away from I-80 at the Iowa 14 interchange. US 6 overlaps Iowa 14 for one-third mile (540 m). It turns off of Iowa 14 and enters the western side of Newton where it passes the Jasper County courthouse located in the downtown area. Between Newton and Grinnell, the route has more hills and curves. The highway crosses the North Skunk River near Kellogg. At Grinnell, it intersects Iowa 146 southwest of the Grinnell College campus. East of Grinnell, the route straightens out and is overlapped by US 63 for two miles (3.2 km) and by Iowa 21 for four miles (6.4 km). Near Victor, US 6 takes a northeasterly course through Ladora toward Marengo. At Marengo, it intersects the eastern end of Iowa 212. Five miles (8.0 km) east of Marengo is the western end of Iowa 20. Here, US 6 forms the southern leg of the Amana Colonies Trail. Three miles (4.8 km) later, it is joined by US 151 for two miles (3.2 km). US 6 heads to the southeast toward Tiffin and passes underneath I-380 but does not have direct access.

=== Eastern Iowa ===
At Coralville, US 6 passes underneath I-80, but one-half mile (800 m) to the east, Coral Ridge Avenue provides direct access to I-80. Entering Iowa City, the highway passes the campus of the University of Iowa, its main hospital, and VA Hospital. US 6 curves to the south to be adjacent to the Iowa River, where it meets and overlaps Iowa 1 for one-half mile (800 m). US 6 and Iowa 1 go in separate directions at a signal controlled intersection, where, less than one-quarter mile (400 m) away, US 6 crosses the Iowa River. From Iowa City, it heads in an east-southeast direction toward West Liberty. The highway enters West Liberty from the northwest corner and curves southward. At the northern end of Iowa 70, it turns to the east again toward Atalissa and Wilton. The road crosses the Cedar River 10 miles (16 km) southwest of Wilton. Three miles (4.8 km) south of Wilton, the highway overlaps Iowa 38, and the two routes head toward I-80. At the Wilton interchange along I-80, Iowa 38 turns west and US 6 turns east onto the Interstate, respectively.

As I-80 and US 6 approach the Quad Cities metropolitan area, the speed limit drops again to 65 mph (105 km/h). Just within the city limits of Davenport is the I-280 interchange. US 6 exits to the south to join I-280. US 61 also joins I-280 at this interchange but from the opposite direction. US 6 only overlaps I-280 / US 61 for four-fifths mile (1,300 m) before exiting onto Kimberly Road. Heading southeast into Davenport, US 6 is a two-lane highway for three miles (4.8 km). At Fairmount Street, it becomes a four-lane divided highway and straightens out to head due east. Near NorthPark Mall, it intersects Northwest Boulevard, which becomes Iowa 130 at I-80, and both one-way legs, Welcome Way southbound and Brady Street northbound, of US 61 Business, which, prior to 2010, was US 61. US 6 briefly dips to the southeast and straightens out again toward I-74. The highway joins I-74 and heads to the south toward Moline, Illinois. For about one mile (1.6 km), I-74 / US 6 forms the boundary of Davenport and Bettendorf. The two routes completely enter Bettendorf and descend into the Mississippi River valley, where they meet US 67 at a complex series of exit and entrance ramps. They then ascend the Iowa–Illinois Memorial Bridge, known locally as the I-74 Bridge, and cross the Mississippi River into Illinois.

== History ==
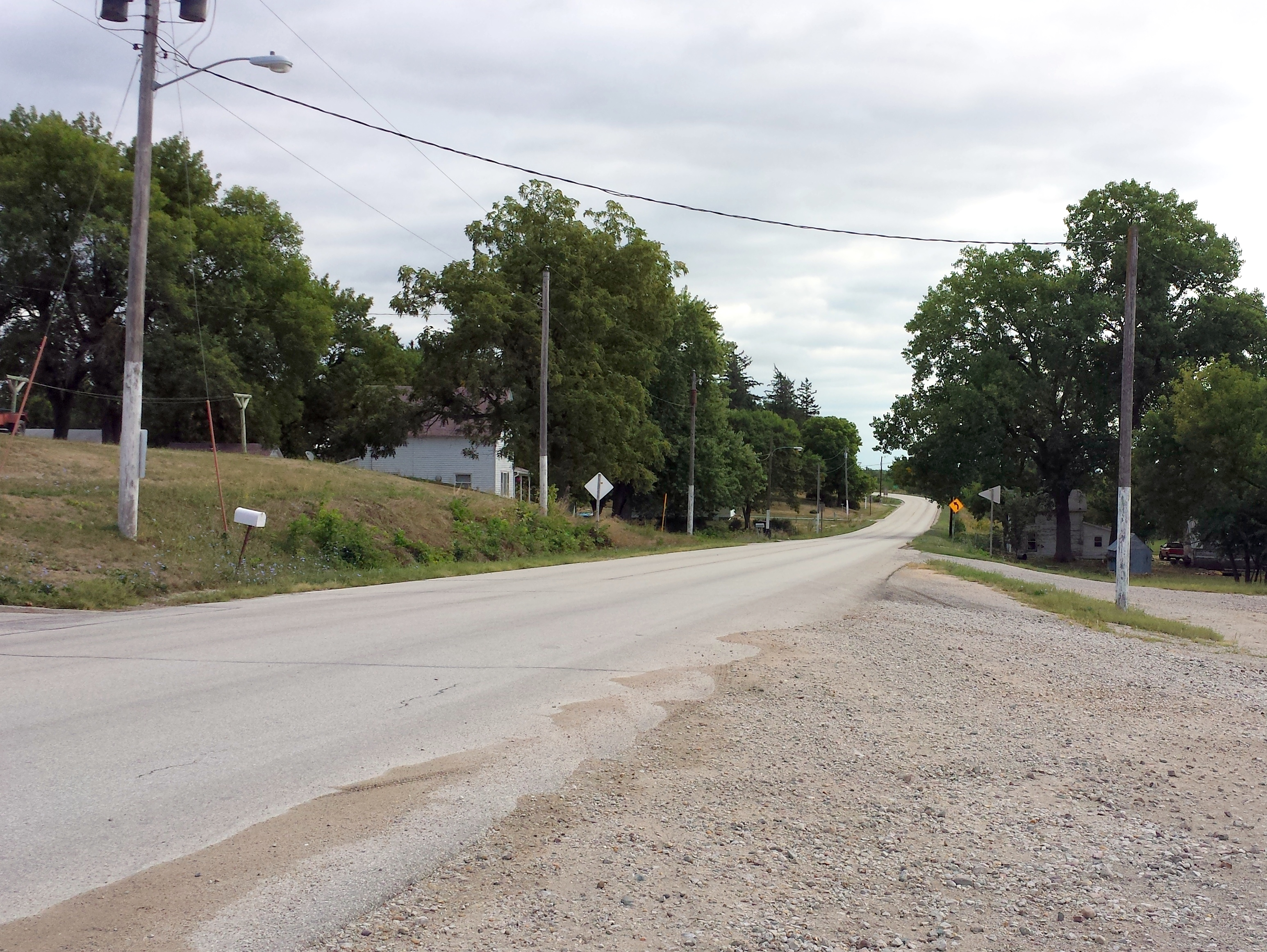
The White Pole Road in Casey

Before the U.S. Numbered Highway System came into being in 1926, roads in Iowa were maintained and promoted by local organizations which sought to drive traffic into their communities. Two such organizations created virtually parallel routes connecting Council Bluffs and Davenport via Des Moines. The routes, the southern Great White Way and northern River-to-River Road, eventually merged into the Whiteway-7-Highway. The new route followed the Great White Way from Council Bluffs to Des Moines and the River-to-River Road from Des Moines to Davenport. In 1926, the Whiteway-7-Highway became US 32, which itself became US 6 in 1931. For a time, US 6 was the busiest highway in the state. After I-80 was built near US 6, portions of the U.S. Highway were moved onto the Interstate Highway. Interest in the original US 6 corridor has grown in the 21st century by people who seek to drive traffic back into their communities.

=== Great White Way/White Pole Road ===
Great White Way
- Location: Council Bluffs–Davenport
- Length: 340 mi (550 km)
- Existed: July 30, 1914–September 21, 1922

The Great White Way was formed in 1910 by the White Pole Auto Club. The route was built along the Chicago, Rock Island and Pacific Railroad between Council Bluffs and Des Moines. Members of the auto club painted poles along the route white, which lead the route to be known as the White Pole Road. The Great White Way passed through Oakland, Atlantic, Adair, De Soto, and Valley Junction. In late 1912, the Great White Way was extended east to Davenport, passing through Pella, Oskaloosa, Washington, and Muscatine. In 1913, when the Iowa State Highway Commission began registering named trails longer than 25 miles (40 km), the Great White Way Association paid the $5.00 fee (equivalent to $163.00 in 2025) to become the first official registered highway route on July 30, 1914. When the primary highway system was created, the Great White Way was assigned Primary Road No. 2.

In 2002, a group of residents from Adair, Casey, Menlo, Stuart, and Dexter formed a new group to promote the White Pole Road. Their intention was to bring visitors to their towns by diverting some traffic from the nearby I-80 / US 6 corridor to the south and onto the historic road. Poles were painted white up to nine feet (2.7 m) high line along the 26-mile (42 km) drive. White Pole Road logo signs in each town give a short history of the town and their founders.

=== River-to-River Road ===
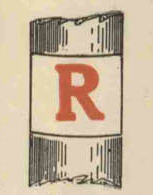
River-to-River Road
- Location: Council Bluffs–Davenport
- Length: 316 mi (509 km)
- Existed: April 16, 1918–November 11, 1926

The River-to-River Road (RRR) was also created in 1910 and also connected Council Bluffs and Davenport via Des Moines. This route, however, traveled a more northern route than the Great White Way. The route passed through Neola, Elk Horn, Guthrie Center, Adel, Des Moines, Newton, Marengo, Iowa City, and Wilton. The route's origins trace back to the 1909–1910 winter season which brought, on average, 11 inches (28 cm) of snow more than the previous year, which was followed by an unusually dry spring. Coupled with the advent of the Ford Model T, many Iowans complained about the lack of good roads in the state. Governor Beryl F. Carroll convened a Good Roads convention on March 8–9, 1910, to discuss the condition of roads in his state. It was then that the route of the RRR was decided among the convention delegates. Further influencing the RRR corridor was an announcement from the American Automobile Association that the annual Glidden Tour would pass through Iowa. Governor Carroll arranged for farmers who lived along the route to drag all 380 miles (610 km) of the road on the Saturday prior to the tour's arrival at precisely 9:00 am. Work was finished in one hour.

When the highway commission started accepting registered routes, the RRR association planned to register their route as soon as possible. But miscommunication between association members and with the highway commission delayed the actual registration for years. The route became official on April 16, 1918. When the primary highway system was created, the RRR was assigned Primary Road No. 7.

=== Whiteway-7-Highway ===
Whiteway-7-Highway
- Location: Chicago, Illinois–Omaha, Nebraska
- Existed: September 21, 1922–November 11, 1926

The Whiteway-7-Highway was registered by the Whiteway-7-Highway Association filing an application in 1922 with the Iowa State Highway Commission. The commission was concerned with the Whiteway-7-Highway's similarity to the Great White Way's name and route markings. The Great White Way was marked with a six-foot-wide (1.8 m) stripe, while the Whiteway-7-Highway would be marked with a four-foot (1.2 m) stripe with a black circle containing a white seven. Another concern with the new route was since its name contained the number seven, the route would be assigned along Primary Road Nos. 2 and 7. On September 25, 1922, the highway commission gave the Great White Way from Des Moines to Council Bluffs, which would become part of the Whiteway-7-Highway, the number 7 and gave the RRR's western half number 2. Eight months later, the Iowa State Highway Commission reversed course and restored Primary Road Nos. 2 and 7 to their original roadways. Although disappointed, the Whiteway-7-Highway Association responded by removing the number from their name. On November 27, 1925, the route officially became the Whiteway Highway.

=== U.S. Numbered Highways ===
U.S. Highway 32
- Location: Council Bluffs–Davenport
- Length: 322 mi (518 km)
- Existed: November 11, 1926–June 8, 1931

On November 11, 1926, members of the American Association of State Highway Officials approved the plan to create a system of interstate highways across the country. Iowa's Whiteway Highway would take on the designation of US 32. For four-and-a-half years, US 32 spanned from Chicago to Council Bluffs. Meanwhile, Roosevelt Highway Association was pushing to have US 6 extended westward. On June 8, 1931, all of the Iowa portion of US 32 was absorbed into a newly extended US 6, which had previously connected Erie, Pennsylvania, and Cape Cod, Massachusetts. The new US 6 also replaced US 38 in Nebraska and Colorado. By the end of 1937, US 6 extended from coast to coast. At the time, it and US 30 were the only cross country highways to bear a single route number across the country.

When the last segment of highway between Adel and Des Moines was paved in 1931, US 6 became the fourth paved road to cross the state. In the early 1940s, US 6 was the most heavily traveled route in the state. The state highway commission recorded that, on average, over 1,900 vehicles used the road per day at any rural point. That compares to nearly 3,000 vehicles using US 6 daily in 2012.

On April 29, 1947, the Iowa General Assembly approved an act designating US 6 as the Grand Army of the Republic Highway, a distinction the route shares in other states. Governor Robert D. Blue dedicated the Grand Army of the Republic Highway at the Iowa Old Capitol Building on September 28, 1947. In attendance were the last two surviving Iowa veterans of the U.S. Civil War. In the 1950s, the Iowa State Highway Commission began to straighten the route. A section of the highway between Grinnell and Ladora was straightened, which resulted in Brooklyn and Victor being bypassed. Between Dexter and West Des Moines, US 6 swapped alignments with Iowa 90 in 1958. In 1961, US 6 was routed onto the new I-80 from the Iowa 90 interchange to the Baxter exit, currently exit 159. Iowa 90 was extended onto the old US 6 alignment. However, in 1967, those changes were reversed and US 6 was taken off I-80 and put back on the road which had been Iowa 90. Iowa 90 was assigned the section of US 6 between what's now exit 106 along I-80 and exit 69 along I-35.

=== Abandoned sections ===
Since the 1970s, portions of US 6 have been moved permanently onto I-80. The first section, between US 71 and Adair, was rerouted in 1972. The abandoned section became an extended Iowa 83 and CR G30 in Adair County. In 1980, three lengthy sections were moved onto the Interstate: 26 miles (42 km) in western Iowa between Adair and Dexter, 25 miles (40 km) in central Iowa between Altoona and Newton, and 20 miles (32 km) in eastern Iowa between Wilton and Davenport. All three sections were originally kept as state highways, but, in 1991, when Iowa DOT first showed the new state highways' designations on the state highway map, the central section already had been turned over to Polk and Jasper counties. The western segment was numbered Iowa 925 and the eastern segment Iowa 927.

On July 1, 2003, 15 miles (24 km) between Dexter and Adel were turned over to Dallas County. US 6, which had previously split away from I-80 at the Dexter exit, was continued along I-80 to the US 169 interchange at De Soto, and then along US 169 to Adel. The former segments, Iowa 925 and Iowa 927, were turned over to their respective counties as well.

== Major intersections ==
County	Location	mi	km	Exit	Destinations	Notes
Missouri River		0.000	0.000		I-480 west / US 6 west (Gerald R. Ford Expressway) – Omaha	Continuation into Nebraska
Missouri River		0.000	0.000	Grenville Dodge Memorial Bridge; Nebraska–Iowa state line		
Pottawattamie	Council Bluffs	0.138	0.222	0	Riverfront / W Broadway	Eastbound exit and westbound entrance; exit number follows I-480
Pottawattamie	Council Bluffs	0.178– 0.761	0.286– 1.225	53B	I-480 ends / I-29 north – Sioux City	Eastern end of I-480 overlap; western end of I-29 overlap; exit numbers follow I-29
Pottawattamie	Council Bluffs	1.172	1.886	53A	9th Avenue / Harrah's Boulevard – Casino	
Pottawattamie	Council Bluffs	1.997	3.214	52	Nebraska Avenue – Riverboat Casino, Dog Track-Casino	
Pottawattamie	Council Bluffs	2.269	3.652	51	I-80 Express east – Des Moines I-80 Local begins / I-80 west – Omaha	Eastern end of I-80 Local overlap; eastbound exit and westbound entrance
Pottawattamie	Council Bluffs	3.707	5.966	50	S. 24th Street – Council Bluffs, Mid-America Center	
Pottawattamie	Council Bluffs	5.188	8.349	49	South Expressway – Council Bluffs, Business District, Lake Manawa	Former Iowa 192 north
Pottawattamie	Council Bluffs	5.368– 6.202	8.639– 9.981	48 4	I-29 south / I-80 Local ends – Kansas City I-80 Express west – Omaha	Eastern end of I-29 and I-80 Local overlaps; western end of I-80 overlap; signed as exit 4 eastbound; I-29 north exits 48A-B
Pottawattamie	Council Bluffs	7.013	11.286	5	Madison Avenue – Council Bluffs	
Pottawattamie	Council Bluffs	10.424	16.776	8	I-80 east – Des Moines, Council Bluffs	Eastern end of I-80 overlap
Pottawattamie	Belknap Township	30.366	48.869		US 59 south – Shenandoah	Western end of US 59 overlap
Pottawattamie	Oakland	32.772	52.741		US 59 north – Avoca	Eastern end of US 59 overlap
Cass	Cass Township	45.621	73.420		Iowa 48 south – Griswold	
Cass	Cass Township	48.421	77.926		CR G43 / CR M56 – Lewis	Former Iowa 414
Cass	Atlantic	55.97	90.07		Iowa 83 west (Poplar Street)	Western end of Iowa 83 overlap
Cass	Atlantic	57.545	92.610		US 71 south – Villisca	Western end of US 71 overlap
Cass	Grove Township	59.545	95.828		Iowa 83 east – Anita	Eastern end of Iowa 83 overlap
Cass	Pymosa Township	65.989	106.199	60	I-80 west / US 71 north – Audubon, Council Bluffs	Eastern end of US 71 overlap; western end of I-80 overlap; exit numbers follow I-80
Cass	Benton Township	69.920	112.525	64	CR N28 – Wiota	
Cass	Grant Township	75.652	121.750	70	Iowa 148 south – Anita, Exira	
Adair	Adair	80.662	129.813	75	CR G30	Former US 6
Adair	Adair	81.654	131.409	76	CR N54 – Adair	Former Iowa 925
Adair	Casey	88.087	141.762	83	CR N77 (Antique Country Drive) – Casey	
Adair	Jefferson Township	91.585	147.392	86	Iowa 25 – Guthrie Center, Greenfield	
Adair	Jefferson Township	93.573	150.591	88	CR P20 – Menlo	
Adair	Stuart	98.578	158.646	93	CR P28 – Stuart, Panora	
Adair–Madison county line	Lincoln–Penn township line	102.568	165.067	97	CR P48 – Dexter	
Dallas	Dexter	105.480	169.754	100	CR F60 – Dexter, Redfield	Former US 6
Dallas	Adams Township	109.350	175.982	104	CR P57 – Earlham	Former Iowa 232
Dallas	Adams Township	111.747	179.839	106	CR P58 / CR F90	Former Iowa 90
Dallas	De Soto	115.472	185.834	110	I-80 east / US 169 south – Des Moines, De Soto, Winterset	Eastern end of I-80 overlap; western end of US 169 overlap
Dallas	Adel	120.669	194.198		US 169 north – Fort Dodge	Eastern end of US 169 overlap
Polk	Clive–Urbandale city line	133.170	214.316		I-35 / I-80	I-80 exit 125
Polk	Des Moines	136.957	220.411		Iowa 28 south (63rd Street)	Western end of Iowa 28 overlap
Polk	Des Moines	137.268	220.911		Hickman Road east	Former City US 6
Polk	Des Moines	138.273	222.529		Iowa 28 north (Merle Hay Road)	Eastern end of Iowa 28 overlap
Polk	Des Moines	142.355	229.098		Iowa 415 north (2nd Avenue)	
Polk	Des Moines	143.337	230.679		US 69 (E. 14th Street)	
Polk	Des Moines	144.649	232.790		I-235	I-235 exit 12
Polk	Des Moines	146.067	235.072		Hubbell Avenue south	Former City US 6
Polk	Des Moines	148.009	238.197		E. Broadway Avenue (Historic US 6 east)	
Polk	Des Moines–Altoona city line	148.361	238.764		US 65 – Indianola	Interchange
Polk	Altoona	149.678	240.883	142	I-80 west / US 65 / Iowa 330 north – Marshalltown, Bondurant	Western end of I-80 overlap
Polk	Altoona–Bondurant city line	151.313	243.515	143	Altoona, Bondurant	Exit numbers follow I-80; former Iowa 945
Polk	Mitchellville	156.444	251.772	149	Mitchellville	
Jasper	Colfax	162.799	262.000	155	Iowa 117 – Mingo, Colfax	
Jasper	Sherman Township	166.465	267.899	159	Historic US 6 / CR F48 – Baxter	
Jasper	Newton	171.902	276.649	165	I-80 east / Iowa 14 south – Monroe, Davenport	Eastern end of I-80 overlap; western end of Iowa 14 overlap
Jasper	Newton	173.318	278.928		Iowa 14 north / Historic US 6 west – Marshalltown	Eastern end of Iowa 14 overlap
Jasper	Kellogg Township	182.342	293.451		Iowa 224 to I-80 – Kellogg	
Poweshiek	Grinnell	192.649	310.039		Iowa 146 (West Street)	
Poweshiek	Malcom Township	199.722	321.421		US 63 north / Historic US 6 east – Tama	Western end of US 63 overlap
Poweshiek	Malcom Township	201.762	324.704		US 63 south – Malcom, Montezuma	Eastern end of US 63 overlap
Poweshiek	Bear Creek Township	207.246	333.530		CR V18 – Brooklyn	Former Iowa 398
Poweshiek	Warren Township	211.773	340.816		Iowa 21 south – Deep River	Western end of Iowa 21 overlap
Poweshiek–Iowa county line	Warren–Hartford township line	214.795	345.679		CR V36 – Victor	Former Iowa 419
Iowa	Hartford Township	216.006	347.628		Iowa 21 north – Belle Plaine	Eastern end of Iowa 21 overlap
Iowa	Hartford Township	217.917	350.703		Historic US 6 west	
Iowa	Marengo	227.117	365.509		Iowa 212 west – Marengo	
Iowa	Washington Township	230.792	371.424		CR V77 to I-80 – Williamsburg	Former Iowa 149
Iowa	Amana Colonies	232.877	374.779		Iowa 220 east (Amana Colonies Trail)	
Iowa	Amana Colonies	235.928	379.689		US 151 south to I-80	Western end of US 151 overlap
Iowa	Amana Colonies	237.869	382.813		US 151 north (Amana Colonies Trail) – Cedar Rapids	Eastern end of US 151 overlap
Johnson	Oxford Township	242.985	391.046		CR W38 – Oxford	Former Iowa 109
Johnson	Coralville	252.924	407.042		Coral Ridge Avenue (Iowa 965) to I-80	
Johnson	Iowa City	257.225	413.964		Iowa 1 north (W. Burlington Street)	Western end of Iowa 1 overlap
Johnson	Iowa City	257.971	415.164		Iowa 1 south – Kalona	Eastern end of Iowa 1 overlap
Muscatine	West Liberty	274.736	442.145		Iowa 70 south	
Muscatine	Moscow–Wilton township line	286.319	460.786		Iowa 38 south	Western end of Iowa 38 overlap
Cedar	Wilton	287.956	463.420		Historic US 6 east	
Cedar	Sugar Creek Township	291.054	468.406	271	I-80 west / Iowa 38 north – Des Moines	Eastern end of Iowa 38 overlap; western end of I-80 overlap
Cedar	Farmington Township	297.276	478.419	277	Bennett, Durant	Exit numbers follow I-80
Scott	Cleona Township	300.458	483.540	280	CR Y30 – New Liberty, Stockton	
Scott	Walcott	304.543	490.114	284	CR Y40 – Walcott, Plain View	
Scott	Davenport	309.861– 310.614	498.673– 499.885	290	I-80 east / US 61 north – Chicago I-280 begins	Eastern end of I-80 overlap; western end of I-280 / US 61 overlap
Scott	Davenport	311.122	500.702	1	I-280 east / US 61 south / CR F58 west – Walcott	Eastern end of I-280 / US 61 overlap; exit number follows I-280
Scott	Davenport	314.084	505.469		Hickory Grove Road	Former Iowa 350
Scott	Davenport	317.032	510.214		Northwest Boulevard	Former Iowa 130
Scott	Davenport	317.410	510.822		US 61 Bus. south (Welcome Way)	One-way street
Scott	Davenport	317.554	511.054		US 61 Bus. north (Brady Street)	One-way street
Scott	Davenport	319.763	514.609		Kimberly Road south	Former US 6
Scott	Davenport–Bettendorf city line	319.962	514.929	2	I-74 west / Spruce Hills Drive	Western end of I-74 overlap; exit numbers follow I-74
Scott	Bettendorf	320.957	516.530	3	Middle Road	
Scott	Bettendorf	321.998	518.206	4	US 67 (Grant Street, State Street) / Kimberly Road	
Mississippi River		322.454	518.939	I-74 Bridge; Iowa–Illinois state line		
Mississippi River		322.454	518.939		I-74 east / US 6 east – Peoria	Continuation into Illinois
1.000 mi = 1.609 km; 1.000 km = 0.621 mi: Concurrency terminus; Incomplete access

U.S. Route 6
Previous state: Nebraska	Iowa	Next state: Illinois
