= Interstate 80 in Iowa =

Highway in Iowa

Interstate 80
- I-80 highlighted in red

Route information
- Maintained by Iowa DOT
- Length: 306.268 mi (492.891 km)
- Existed: September 21, 1958–present
- History: Under construction: 1958–1972
- NHS: Entire route

Major junctions
- West end: I-80 at the Nebraska state line in Council Bluffs
- I-29 in Council Bluffs; I-880 near Neola; I-35 / I-235 near Des Moines; I-380 / US 218 / Iowa 27 in Coralville; I-280 in Davenport; I-74 in Davenport
- East end: I-80 at the Illinois state line in LeClaire

Location
- Country: United States
- State: Iowa
- Counties: Pottawattamie; Cass; Adair; Madison; Dallas; Polk; Jasper; Poweshiek; Iowa; Johnson; Cedar; Scott

Highway system
- Interstate Highway System; Main; Auxiliary; Suffixed; Business; Future; Iowa Primary Highway System; Interstate; US; State; Secondary; Scenic
| ← Iowa 78 | → Iowa 81 |

Interstate 80 (I-80) is a transcontinental Interstate Highway in the United States, stretching from San Francisco, California, to Teaneck, New Jersey. In Iowa, the highway travels west to east through the center of the state. It enters the state at the Missouri River in Council Bluffs and heads east through the southern Iowa drift plain. In the Des Moines metropolitan area, I-80 meets up with I-35 and the two routes bypass Des Moines together. On the northern side of Des Moines, the Interstates split and I-80 continues east. In eastern Iowa, it provides access to the University of Iowa in Iowa City. Northwest of the Quad Cities in Walcott is Iowa 80, the world's largest truck stop. I-80 passes along the northern edge of Davenport and Bettendorf and leaves Iowa via the Fred Schwengel Memorial Bridge over the Mississippi River into Illinois.

Before I-80 was planned, the route between Council Bluffs and Davenport, which passed through Des Moines, was vital to the state. Two competing auto trails, the Great White Way and the River-to-River Road, sought to be the best path to connect three of the state's major population centers. The two trails combined in the 1920s and eventually became US Highway 32 (US 32) in 1926. US 6, which had taken the place of US 32, became the busiest highway in the state. In the early 1950s, plans were drawn up for the construction of an Iowa Turnpike, to be the first modern four-lane highway in the state, along the US 6 corridor. Plans for the turnpike were shelved when the Interstate Highway System was created in 1956.

Construction of I-80 took place for over 14 years. The first section of the Interstate opened on September 21, 1958, in the western suburbs of Des Moines. New sections of the highway opened up regularly over the next 12 years, even though construction in eastern Iowa was completed in 1966. The final piece of I-80 in Iowa, the Missouri River bridge to Omaha, Nebraska, opened on December 15, 1972. By the 1980s, I-80 had fallen into disrepair in Iowa and across the country. Federal funding was freed up in 1985 to allow reconstruction of the highway.

== Route description ==
I-80 is the longest Interstate Highway in Iowa. It extends from west to east across the central portion of the state through the population centers of the Omaha–Council Bluffs metropolitan area, Des Moines metropolitan area, and Quad Cities. The majority of the highway runs through farmland, yet roughly a third of Iowa's population live along the I-80 corridor. The route closely follows the Iowa Interstate Railroad, which was once the Chicago, Rock Island and Pacific Railroad Main Line in Iowa.

=== Western Iowa ===
I-80 enters Iowa on a bridge over the Missouri River, where it leaves Omaha, Nebraska, to enter Council Bluffs. Almost immediately after landing on the Iowa side of the bridge, it meets I-29 and US 6 at a Y interchange. At the interchange, I-80 splits into a local–express lane configuration. The inner express lanes do not provide any connection to I-29 nor to any of the intermediate interchanges between the two junctions with I-29. The outer local lanes are concurrent with I-29 through southern Council Bluffs for three miles (4.8 km). The speed limit through this section is 65 miles per hour (105 km/h). The South 24th Street interchange serves a commercial area anchored by the Mid-America Center and Horseshoe Casino. The South Expressway exit, which previously marked the southern end of Iowa Highway 192 (Iowa 192), is adjacent to a big-box store commercial center. At the East System interchange in Council Bluffs; I-29 heads south while I-80 and US 6 head to the northeast.

East of the I-29 split, I-80 travels northeast for the next 20 miles (32 km). It passes through eastern Council Bluffs where it serves a commercial/residential area. At exit 8, US 6 exits the freeway and heads west. The Interstate leaves Council Bluffs and speed limit increases to 70 miles per hour (110 km/h). Here, I-80 roughly follows the course of Mosquito Creek past Underwood and Neola, both of which are served by interchanges. About two miles (3.2 km) of Neola, I-80 curves to the east as it meets the eastern end of I-880 at a directional T interchange.

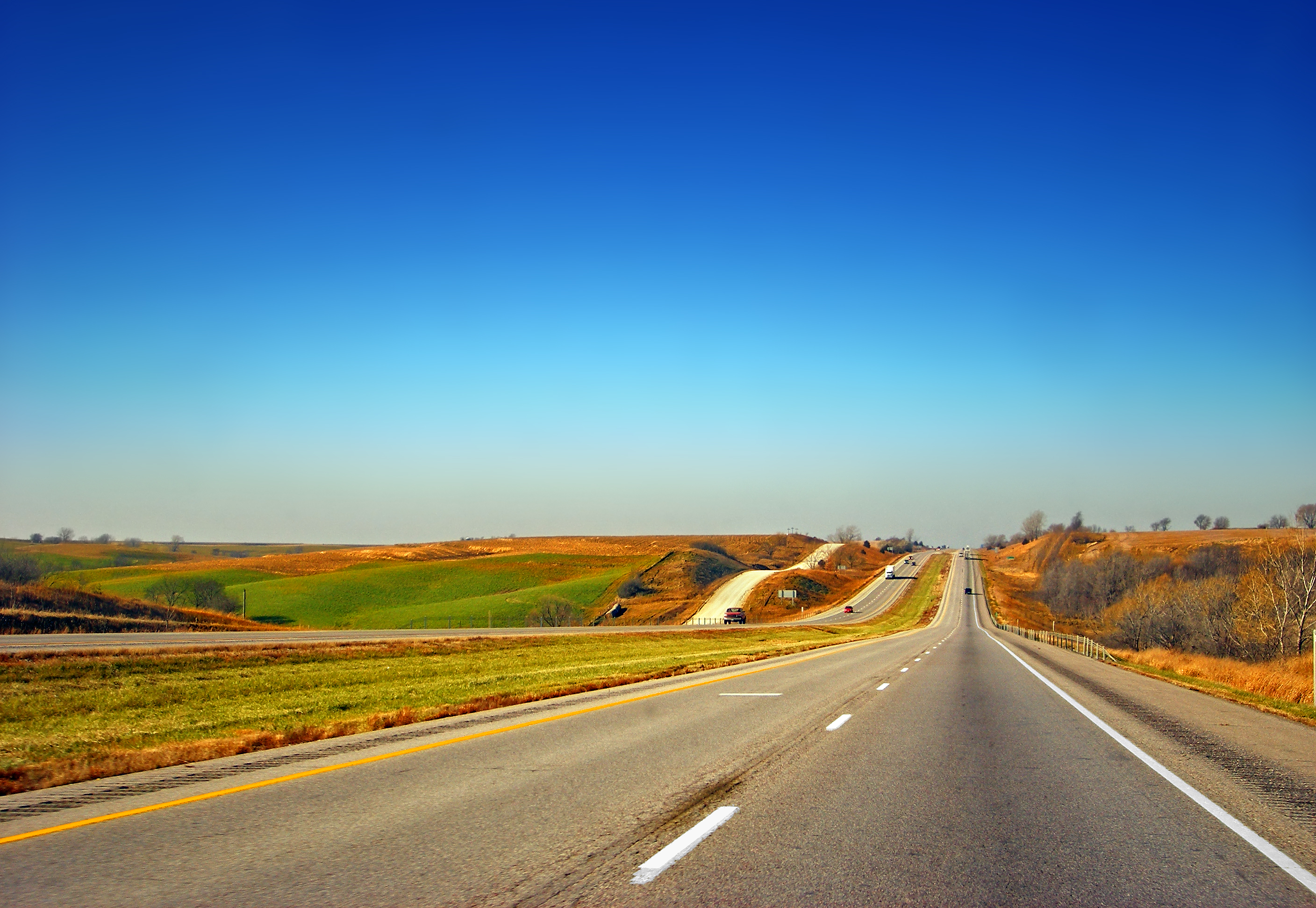
I-80 rolling through western Iowa

For the next 50 miles (80 km), I-80 runs in more or less a straight line. Interchanges occur at regular intervals; three to six miles (4.8 to 9.7 km) of Pottwattamie and Cass county farmland separate each exit from the next. Near Avoca, it crosses the West Nishnabotna River and meets US 59. East of the interchange, the Interstate crosses the eastern branch of the West Nishnabotna River. As I-80 approaches the area north of Atlantic, there are three interchanges, Iowa 173, County Road N16 (CR N16), and US 71, which serve the western, central, and eastern parts of the city, respectively. Iowa 173, which serves Atlantic by way of Iowa 83, also connects to Elk Horn and Kimballton. US 71, which continues north toward Carroll, carries US 6 traffic to the Interstate. At this point, US 6 begins the first of three instances when its traffic is routed along I-80. In the eastern part of Cass County, the two routes meet the northern end of Iowa 148.

As I-80 and US 6 approach Adair, the highways curve slightly to the south to bypass the community. There are two interchanges in Adair; both of the intersecting roads, at one time or another, carried US 6. CR G30, the White Pole Road, was the original alignment of US 6, while CR N54 has not carried US 6 since 1980. Further east is an interchange with Iowa 25. About one mile (1.6 km) south of the interchange is Freedom Rock. Each year for Memorial Day, the rock is repainted with a patriotic scene by local artist Ray "Bubba" Sorenson II. Near Dexter, I-80 and US 6 graze the northwestern corner of Madison County. After two miles (3.2 km), the routes enter Dallas County and meet CR F60, another former alignment of US 6.

=== Central Iowa ===
Continuing east, the two routes follow a due-east section of highway, where they pass Earlham. Near the CR F90/CR P58 interchange, they start heading northeast towards Des Moines. At De Soto, US 6 splits away from I-80 at the interchange with US 169. Tourists who want to see the covered bridges of Madison County (made famous by the book The Bridges of Madison County) and the birthplace of John Wayne, are directed to follow US 169 south to Winterset. Between De Soto and Van Meter, the Interstate crosses the middle and north branches of the Raccoon River, which converge just south of the crossing of the North Raccoon River.

As the highway gets closer to Des Moines, it moves more sharply to the northeast. In southern Waukee, there is an interchange with Grand Prairie Parkway, the first diverging diamond interchange in the state. As I-80 enters West Des Moines, the speed limit lowers to 65 miles per hour (105 km/h) and the path of the Interstate straightens out to the east at the Jordan Creek Parkway exit. The highway adds a third lane eastbound and drops the third lane westbound. Almost two miles (3.2 km) to the east is the interchange with I-35, which also marks the beginning of I-235. Eastbound I-80 exits the freeway via a flyover ramp to northbound I-35; eastbound I-235 begins as the continuation of the I-80 freeway. Locally, this exit is called the West Mixmaster.

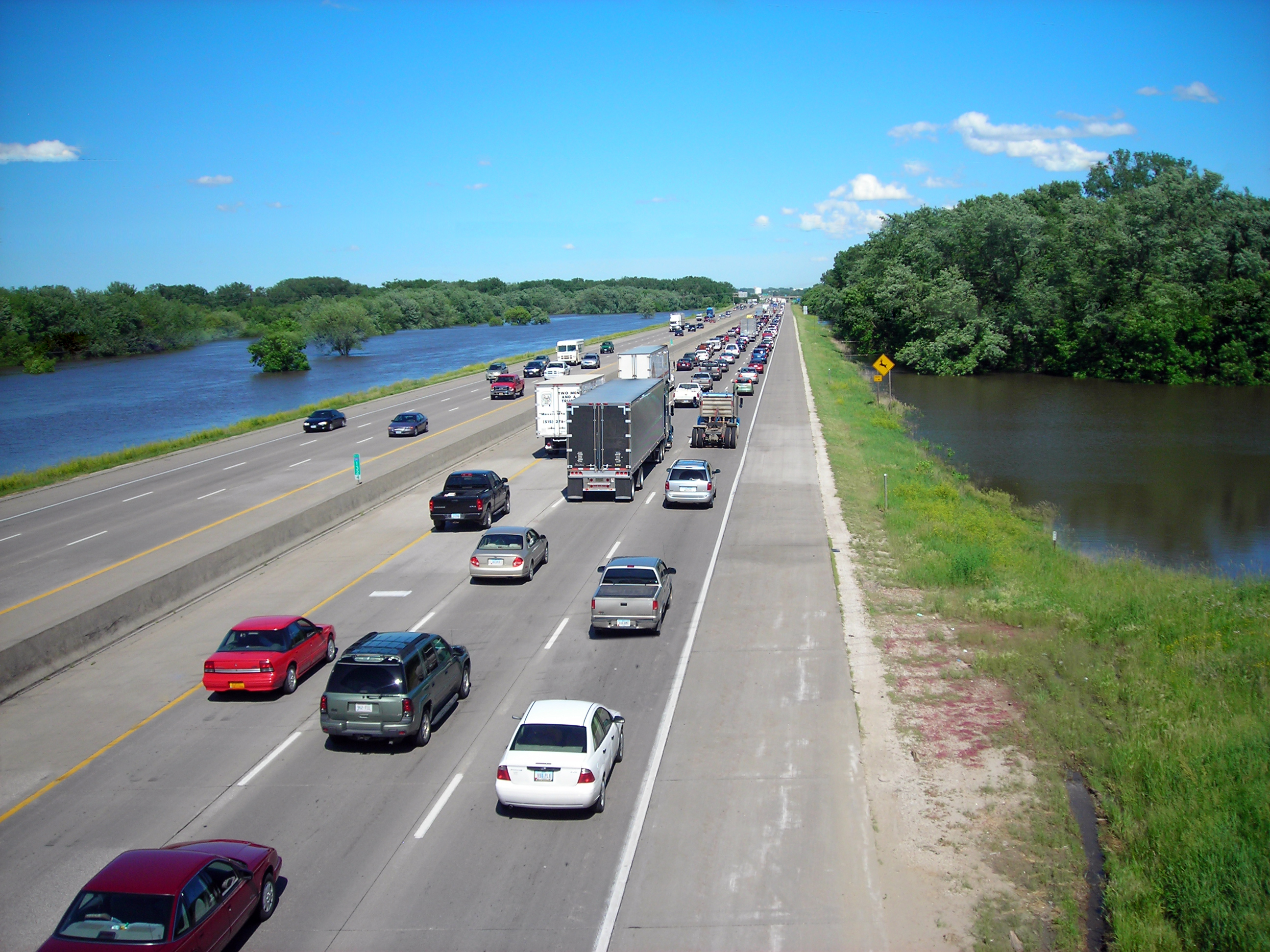
I-35/I-80 approaching the Des Moines River during flooding in 2008

I-80 shares the next 14 miles (23 km) with I-35 on a six-lane freeway where each direction's three lanes are separated by a Jersey barrier. They begin their journey together by heading north; they briefly run through West Des Moines and then cross into Clive at University Avenue. At the Clive–Urbandale city limits is the interchange with Hickman Road, which carries US 6. Hickman Road serves a truck stop to the west and the Living History Farms visitor center to the east. The two Interstates continue north through Urbandale where they pass Douglas Avenue. The Iowa 141 exit is at Rider Corner, the point where the I-35/I-80 freeway curves 90 degrees to the east.

East of the 86th Street exit, the freeway begins a slow descent toward the Des Moines River. Merle Hay Road, named for the first Iowan to die in World War I, carries Iowa 28 from the south to its northern end at the Interstates. They cross the Des Moines River just south of the mouth of Beaver Creek. Four miles (6.4 km) to the east is Iowa 415 and one mile (1.6 km) further east is US 69. Between the interchanges there is a fourth lane in each direction. At the end of their 14 miles (23 km) together, I-35 exits to the north and I-235's eastern end is to the south at the East Mixmaster.

East of I-35, I-80 meets up with US 65 on the outskirts of Altoona. The two routes only share the highway for one mile (1.6 km) as US 65 splits away at the next exit. Here, US 6 rejoins I-80 for the second time and the Interstate returns to its four-lane configuration. After a third exit for Altoona, the Interstate resumes its 70-mile-per-hour (110 km/h) rural limit. Near Colfax, the highways cross the South Skunk River. After an interchange with Iowa 117, the highway is forced to the north to avoid crossing the river multiple times. As it returns south to its original line, it meets CR F48, which was another former alignment of US 6. At the Iowa 14 exit in Newton, US 6 exits off the Interstate. East of Newton is an interchange that serves the Iowa Speedway.

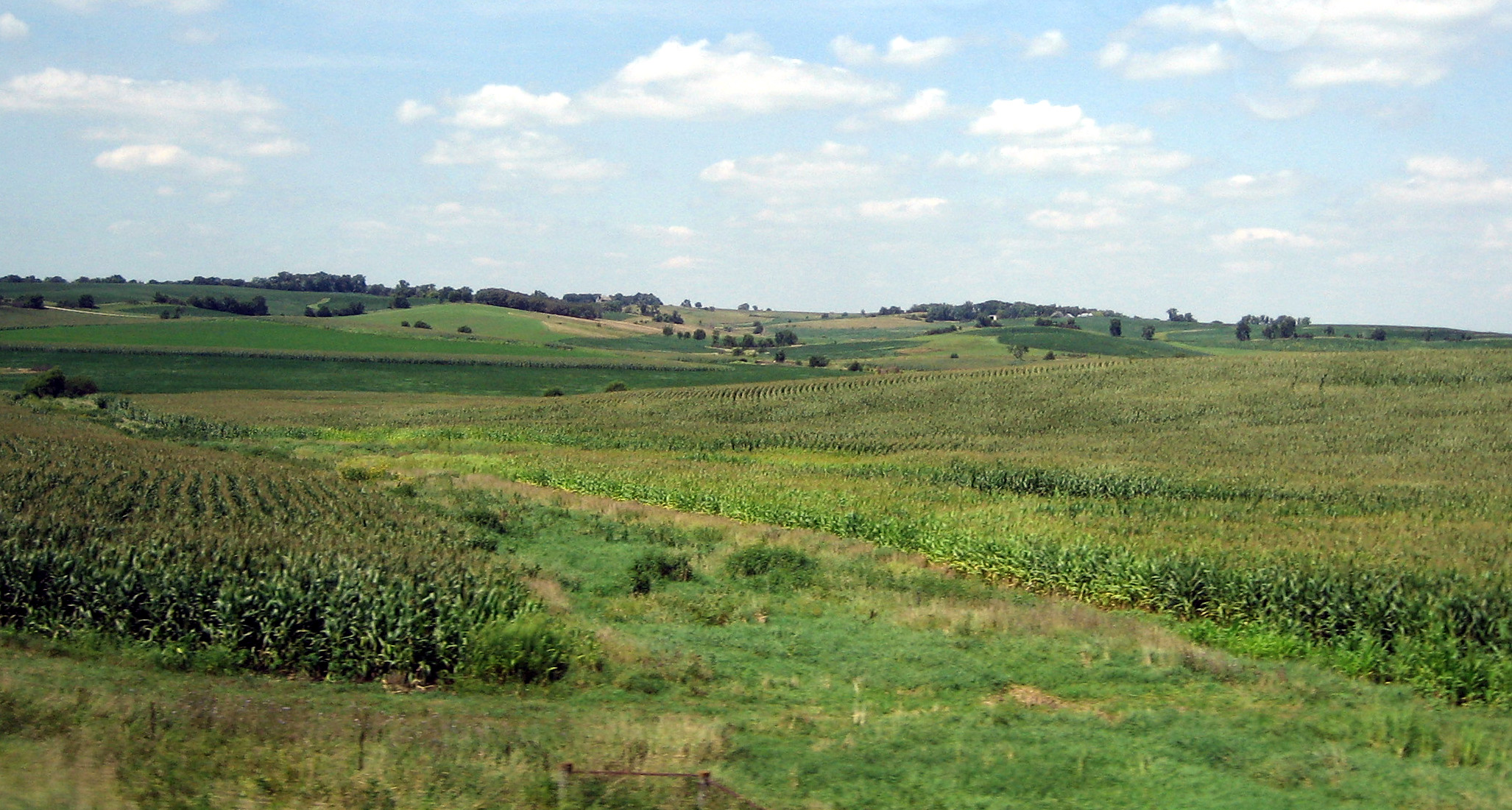
A typical roadside view from I-80

Five miles (8.0 km) east of the speedway is an exit for Iowa 224 which connects to Kellogg. After this interchange, the highway curves to the northeast and descends a hill to cross the North Skunk River. Shortly after the river, it curves back to the east and climbs up the hill. As the road straightens out, it begins a 35-mile-long (56 km) stretch of straight highway. Between the river and the Iowa 146 exit south of Grinnell, the farmland that surrounds the Interstate undulates. Past Grinnell, it passes through the footprint of the North English wind farm, with rows of turbines running parallel to the route. Just south of Malcom, it meets US 63. Further east, at exit 201 for Iowa 21, there are competing truck stops on either side of the freeway.

=== Eastern Iowa ===
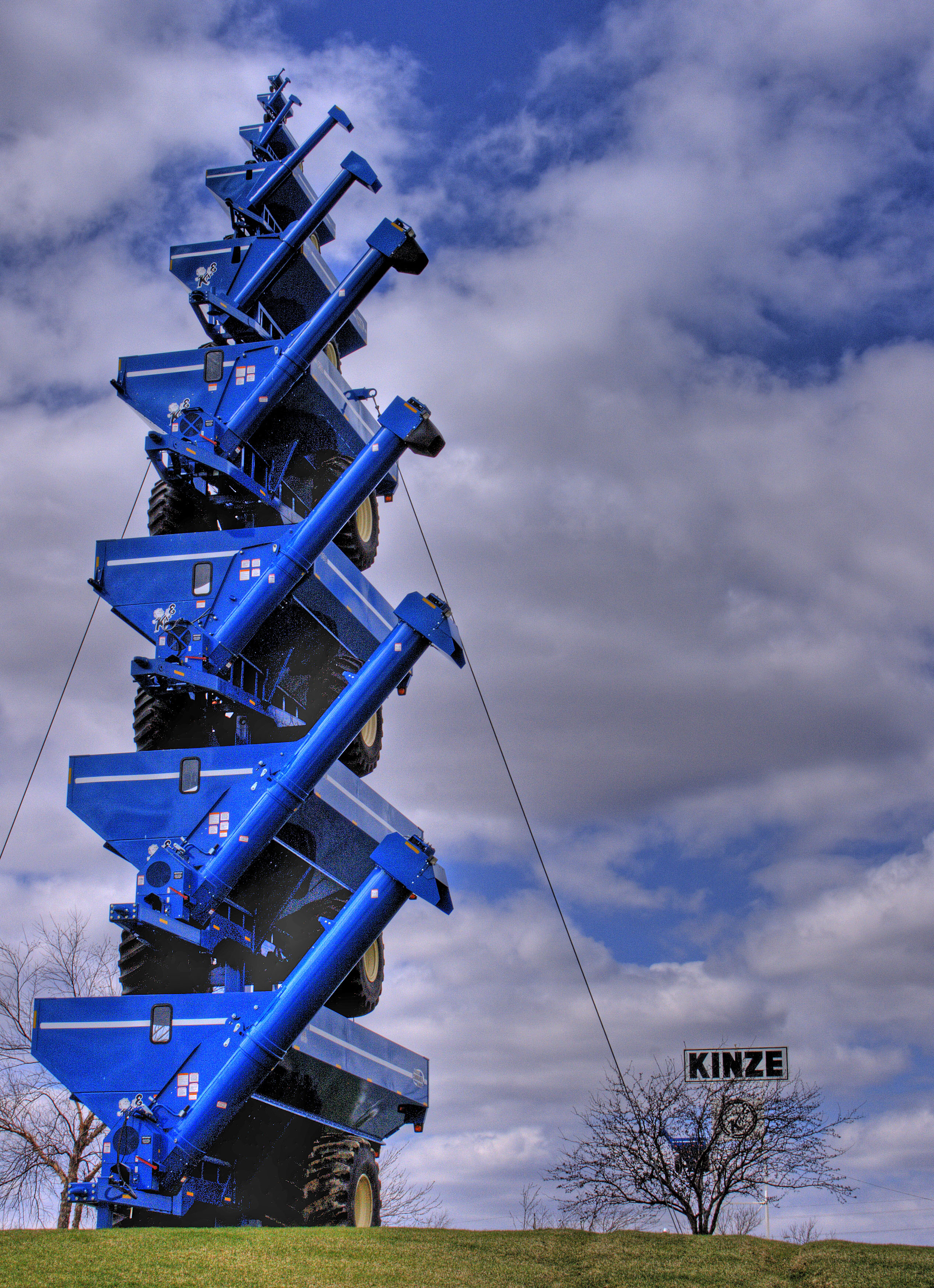
A farm implement manufacturer advertises its business along I-80.

Now in Iowa County, I-80 continues toward the eastern end of the 50-mile (80 km) stretch of straight highway. It turns slightly to the southeast near the Ladora exit and straightens again at the Marengo interchange, where Kinze Manufacturing, a farm implement manufacturer, advertises its business to passing travelers by arranging farm implements into sculptures. A few miles east, in Williamsburg, is the northern end of Iowa 149. The Williamsburg exit is the location of a Tanger Outlet Mall. The next interchange marks the southern end of US 151. Both the Iowa 149 and US 151 interchanges serve the Amana Colonies which are located 10 miles (16 km) to the north.

As I-80 enters the Iowa City area, the speed limit drops to 65 miles per hour (105 km/h). On the edge of Coralville is an interchange with US 218 and Iowa 27. This interchange is also the beginning of I-380, which heads north along US 218 and Iowa 27 toward Cedar Rapids and Waterloo. The I-80/I-380 interchange was identified as the most likely location in Iowa for a semi-trailer truck to overturn. According to the American Transportation Research Institute, 30 trucks rolled over at the interchange during the eight-year study period. The Iowa Department of Transportation (Iowa DOT) replaced the cloverleaf interchange with a turbine interchange, which opened to traffic in August 2023

At the I-380 interchange, I-80 becomes a six-lane freeway. The Coral Ridge Avenue exit provides access to US 6, which passes beneath the Interstate just before the interchange, and the eponymous shopping center located to the southeast. The 1st Avenue exit in Coralville, which was converted to a diverging diamond interchange in 2025 and Dubuque Street exit in Iowa City direct University of Iowa traffic to different parts of the university campus. The Iowa River flows between the two interchanges and also marks the boundary between Coralville and Iowa City. On Iowa City's east side are the Iowa 1 and Herbert Hoover Highway exits. Between them, the highway drops back to four lanes and the speed limit increases to 70 miles per hour (110 km/h).

As it enters Cedar County, it passes West Branch, the birthplace of and site of the library and museum of President Herbert Hoover. It approaches the Cedar River near the village of Rochester. Just east of the river crossing, Iowa 38 joins I-80 from the north. The county road that continues to the south from Iowa 38 leads to Moscow. The two highways travel together for four miles (6.4 km) until they reach the Wilton area. Here, Iowa 38 exits to the south, while US 6 joins I-80 for the last time.

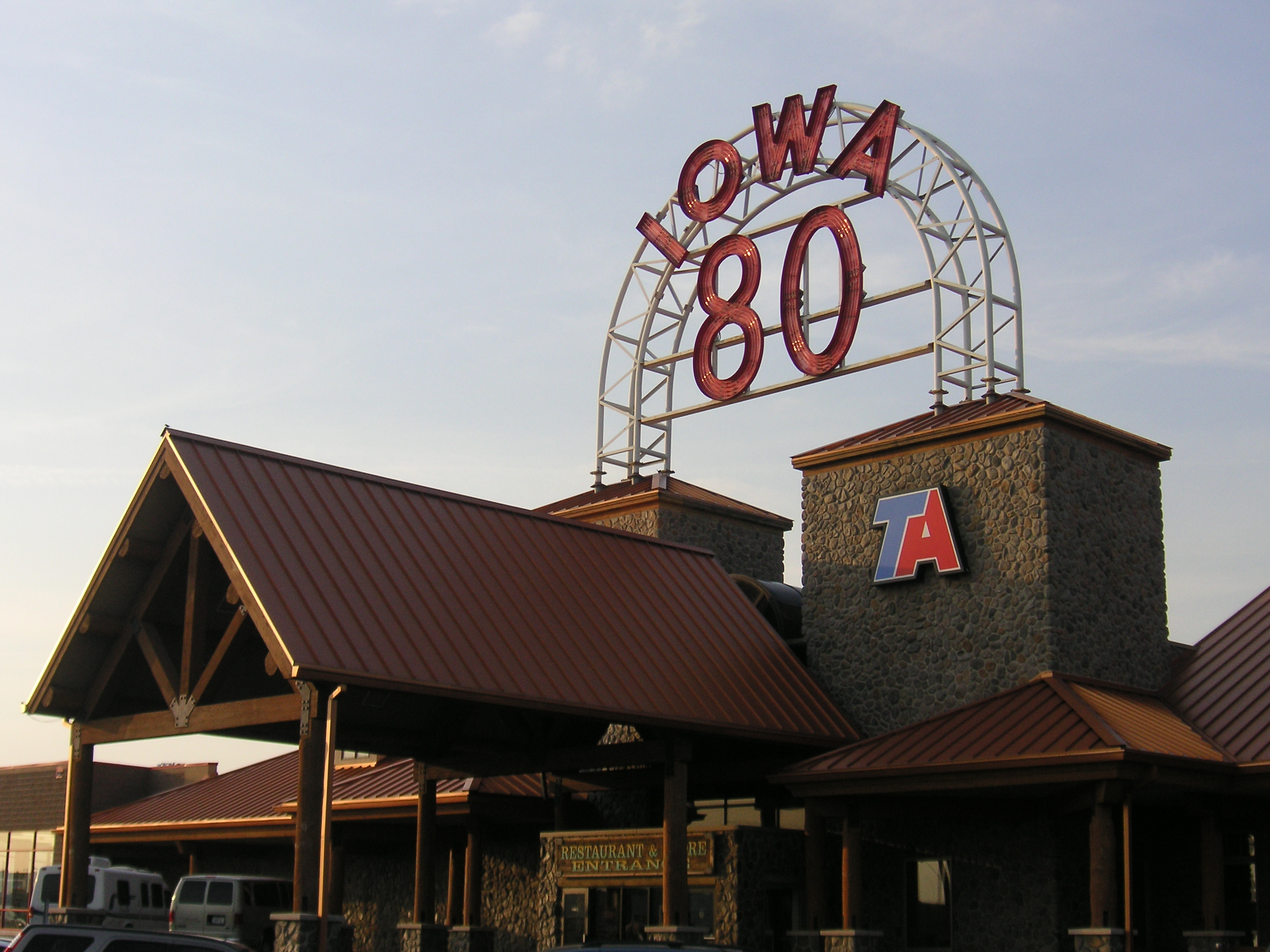
I-80 passes the Iowa 80 truck stop near Walcott.

Before reaching the Quad Cities, I-80 passes Walcott and Iowa 80, which is self-billed as the "World's Largest Truck Stop". The 65-acre (26 ha) truck stop has three restaurants, a gift shop, movie theater, museum, barber shop, and dentist on site. On average, the truck stop has served more than 1.4 million customers per year since it opened in 1965.

As I-80 and US 6 approach the Quad Cities, the speed limit drops to 65 miles per hour (105 km/h) for the final time. Just within the city limits of Davenport is the I-280 interchange. US 6 exits to the south to join I-280 while I-80 is joined by US 61. I-80 and US 61 only share five miles (8.0 km) of freeway before US 61 exits to its own freeway heading north. In between the two exits is an interchange with Northwest Boulevard, which marks the eastern end of Iowa 130. A couple miles east of the eastern US 61 interchange is the western end of I-74. Because of a "turn off to stay on" interchange with I-74 and I-280 near Colona, Illinois, called "the Big X", I-74 through traffic is urged to use I-80 around the Quad Cities to the Big X. At the Big X, traffic from both I-74 and I-80 must exit their respective freeways to continue on the same route. Near the Mississippi River, the Interstate takes a sharp curve to the southeast to line up perpendicularly to the river. Just before the base of the bridge is an interchange with US 67, the last exit in Iowa. I-80 ends its 306-mile-long (492 km) journey through Iowa over the Mississippi River on the Fred Schwengel Memorial Bridge. It enters rural Rock Island County, Illinois, and continues toward Chicago, Illinois.

=== Services ===
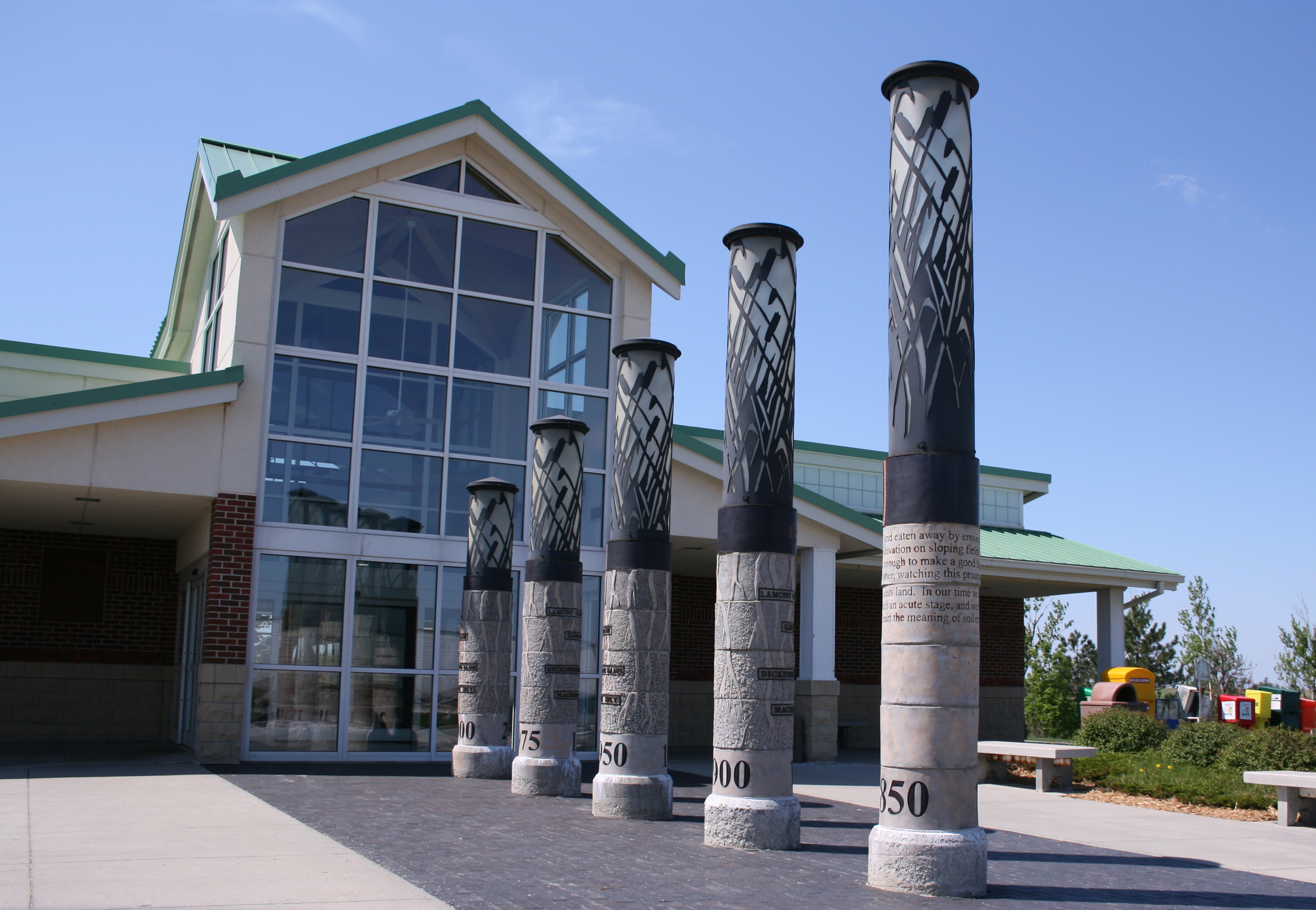
The eastbound rest area facility near Adair

The Iowa DOT operates 37 rest areas and one scenic overlook in 20 locations along its 780 miles (1,260 km) of Interstate highway. Along I-80, there are nine locations that have facilities for each direction of traffic. Parking areas are divided so passenger automobiles are separated from large semitrailer trucks. Common among all of the rest stops are separate men's and women's restrooms, payphones with TDD capabilities, weather reporting kiosks, vending machines, and free wireless internet. Many stations have family restrooms and dump stations for recreational vehicles.

The first rest areas along Iowa's Interstates were built in the 1960s. They were modest facilities; separate buildings housed the restrooms and vending machines. A few rest stops had another building with local tourist information. On August 4, 1999, the first modern rest area opened along eastbound I-80 near Wilton. The new facilities feature one large building housing as many as 28 more toilets than the older buildings, in addition to all the other common rest area amenities. They also feature artwork by local Iowa artists. Each new rest area is designed around a theme. For instance, the facility near Adair is a tribute to the life of Henry A. Wallace, the 33rd Vice President of the United States, who was born in nearby Orient.

== History ==
Since before the Iowa Primary Highway System was created in 1920, the Council Bluffs-to-Davenport, by way of Des Moines, corridor has always been important. Two roughly parallel auto trails, the Great White Way and the River-to-River Road, served cross-state traffic. The two routes were merged into one route, the Whiteway Highway, in 1922. Four years later, the Whiteway Highway would become US 32. The US 32 designation was absorbed into an extended US 6 in 1931. Previously, US 6 had existed only in the Northeastern United States. Within 10 years, US 6 was the most-traveled road in Iowa, with an average of "1,920 cars a day at any given rural point".

=== Iowa Turnpike ===
In 1954, Coverdale & Colpitts, a New York City-based engineering firm working on behalf of the Iowa State Highway Commission, reported on the feasibility of building an east–west toll road, to be called the Iowa Turnpike, across the state. The firm found that the turnpike should closely parallel US 6 between Council Bluffs and Davenport. They concluded that the turnpike could be economically possible if $180 million (equivalent to $1.64 billion in 2024) in revenue bonds were issued at interest rates no higher than 3.5 percent.

In early March 1955, the Iowa General Assembly debated the pros and cons on building a toll road. Proponents of the turnpike said it would be a self-financing project. The feasibility report suggested tolls of 1.5 cents per mile (0.93 ¢/km) (equivalent to 13.7 cents per mile (8.5 ¢/km) in 2024). It was estimated that, in 1953, the turnpike could have generated $5.9 million (equivalent to $55.1 million in 2024). If traffic levels were not high enough to raise enough revenue, as the opponents of the project worried, the state would end up paying for the project, thus defeating the purpose of a toll road.

The proposed highway was to run from Illinois Route 80 near Port Byron, Illinois, which ran along the eastern bank of the Mississippi River, over a new bridge into Iowa. It would then span 298 miles (480 km) across the state to the South Omaha Bridge where US 275 crossed the Missouri River. The entire route was to be near US 6 across the state. It was to be the first modern four-lane highway in the state, with 12-foot-wide (3.7 m) lanes and an at least 15-foot-wide (4.6 m) grassy median. Along the route, 16 interchanges were planned. Most interchanges were to be located near population centers; an option to build a 17th near Grinnell, if necessary, was included. Eight service areas, similar in quality to those found on the Pennsylvania and New Jersey turnpikes, were planned as well.

On April 29, 1955, an enabling act, which created the Iowa Toll Road Authority, came into effect giving the authority the power to further study the feasibility of building a turnpike across the state. Before any construction was to begin, the authority was tasked with developing working relationships with neighboring states' toll road authorities. A provision in the enabling act prevented Iowa from issuing toll road bonds before neighboring states had issued similar bonds. Plans were stalled while Illinois's toll road commission worked out litigation regarding the financing of its bonds. Illinois was the only neighboring state to have a toll-road-planning body.

Construction on the Iowa Turnpike never began. In January 1956, the Federal-Aid Highway Act of 1956 (H.R. 8836) was introduced in Congress. H.R. 8836 created the Interstate Highway System, a national system of controlled-access highways. President Dwight D. Eisenhower signed the bill into law on June 29, 1956. The new law was problematic for the Iowa Turnpike for a couple of reasons. Firstly, the law designated 700 miles (1,100 km) of controlled-access highway in Iowa, including a cross-state route in the vicinity of the turnpike's planned route. Secondly, the federal government was going to pay for 90 percent of the construction costs; states were only required to match 10 percent of costs (however, tolls were generally prohibited). The Interstate Highway System's completeness and financing rendered the Iowa Turnpike obsolete before it was ever constructed.

=== Construction ===
The first section of I-80 to open for traffic, 2 1/2 miles (4.0 km) from the West Mixmaster to the Douglas Avenue interchange in Urbandale, opened on September 21, 1958. By the end of November 1959, the new Interstate extended around the north side of Des Moines to US 69. Within a year, the East Mixmaster, where I-35 splits away to the north, was opened. By the end of 1960, 40 miles (64 km) from US 71 north of Atlantic to US 6 near Dexter, 20 miles (32 km) from I-35 to US 6 west of Newton, and 28 miles (45 km) from Iowa 38 near the Cedar River to US 61 in Davenport had opened to traffic.

In eastern Iowa, new sections of road were opened in series. 1962 saw the eastern section extended 20 miles west to Iowa City and the central section was extended 25 miles (40 km) east to Grinnell. Iowa City's section of interstate was completed on November 15, 1963. A 60-mile-long (97 km) section, the longest section to be opened at one time, connected the two sections in October 1964. The easternmost section of I-80, from US 61 to US 67 at the Mississippi River, opened a month later. This gave travelers nearly 185 miles (298 km) of uninterrupted freeway driving.

Construction then moved to the western half of the state. A new 20-mile-long (32 km) section from US 71 west to US 59 north of Avoca opened in December 1965. A year later, the Interstate was 90 percent completed when two stretches, a 50-mile-long (80 km) stretch from US 59 to I-29, which included 16 miles (26 km) of I-80N and the missing 25-mile-long (40 km) section between the western section and Des Moines, each opened to traffic. Sections of I-80 in the Council Bluffs area did not open for another couple years. A short section between Madison Avenue and US 6 opened in 1968. The Interstate was completed from the eastern junction with I-29 to I-80N in late December 1969.

On both sides of the state, the respective river crossings opened to traffic nearly two years later than the connecting highways. Near LeClaire, the Fred Schwengel Memorial Bridge over the Mississippi River opened in 1966 after the highway had been completed to US 67, which runs at the foot of the bridge, in 1964. The center span of the Mississippi River bridge was installed on June 29, 1966. The 237-foot-long (72 m), 520-short-ton (470 t; 460-long-ton) piece was floated into place by barge. In Council Bluffs, the Missouri River crossing opened on December 15, 1972, while the approach to the bridge opened in November 1970. The Missouri River bridge's completion marked the end of the 14 years it took to construct I-80.

=== Reconstruction ===
As early as the 1980s, traffic levels on I-80 reached the road's design capacity. As a result, the highway required significant repairs for which Iowa's Interstate maintenance program lacked funding. A 16.2-mile-long (26.1 km) section from CR F90 between Earlham and the western junction with I-35 needed $500,000 in annual repairs (equivalent to $1.18 million in 2024). Funds for needed Interstate repair became available in 1985 when President Ronald Reagan signed a bill that freed up $7 billion from the Highway Trust Fund (equivalent to $17.3 billion in 2024), the national mechanism for funding repairs to the Interstate Highway System. Under the law, Iowa was slated to receive $200 million per year for its Interstates (equivalent to $494 million in 2024).

Reconstruction across the state took place in phases. Road crews worked in roughly 15-mile-long (24 km) zones divided into smaller sections. In each section, one direction of highway was closed while the other direction became a two-lane, two-direction road. When one section was completed, the crew would move on to the next section, preventing the entire zone from being closed at once. Iowa was not alone in the required repairs to I-80. The American Automobile Association reported that nearly every state along I-80 had reports of road work. In Iowa, though, there were two sections in 1988 which were particularly troublesome for travelers. The I-680 interchange near Neola was closed, so I-680-bound traffic was forced to travel through Neola on Iowa 191 to reach that highway. Another bottleneck occurred near Williamsburg, where it was a two-lane road for six miles (9.7 km).

Another problem for travelers hoping to avoid the construction on I-80 was the lack of east–west, four-lane highways in Iowa. At the time, the nearest Interstates, I-70 and I-90 were far across state lines in Missouri and Minnesota, respectively. One traveler, interviewed by The Des Moines Register, who was traveling back to Iowa from New York, sought to avoid I-80's construction woes entirely by driving through Canada.

== Exit list ==
| County | Location | mi | km | Exit | Destinations | Notes |
|---|---|---|---|---|---|---|
| Missouri River | | 0.000 | 0.000 | | I-80 west – Omaha | Continuation into Nebraska |
| Missouri River | | 0.000 | 0.000 | Interstate 80 Bridge; Nebraska–Iowa state line | | |
| Pottawattamie | Council Bluffs | 0.719 | 1.157 | 1A | I-29 north / US 6 west – Sioux City | Eastbound exits and westbound entrances; I-29 exit 51 |
| Pottawattamie | Council Bluffs | 0.719 | 1.157 | 1B | I-29 south / US 6 east / I-80 Local east – Kansas City I-80 Express begins | Western end of I-29 overlap (local traffic only); western end of I-80 express lanes |
| Pottawattamie | Council Bluffs | 1.680 | 2.704 | 1B | S. 24th Street – Council Bluffs, Mid-America Center | Closed; now part of I-29 interchange |
| Pottawattamie | Council Bluffs | 3.133 | 5.042 | 3 | South Expressway – Council Bluffs, Business District, Lake Manawa | Closed; now part of I-29 interchange; former Iowa 192 north |
| Pottawattamie | Council Bluffs | 3.837 | 6.175 | 4B | I-29 north / US 6 west / I-80 Local west – Sioux City I-80 Express ends | Westbound exit and eastbound entrance; eastern end of I-29 overlap (local traffic only); western end of US 6 overlap; I-29 south exit 48; eastern end of I-80 express lanes |
| Pottawattamie | Council Bluffs | 3.837 | 6.175 | 4A | I-29 south – Kansas City | Signed as exit 4 eastbound; I-29 north exits 48A-B |
| Pottawattamie | Council Bluffs | 5.174 | 8.327 | 5 | Madison Avenue | |
| Pottawattamie | Council Bluffs | 8.548 | 13.757 | 8 | US 6 east – Oakland, Council Bluffs | Eastern end of US 6 overlap |
| Pottawattamie | Underwood | 17.540 | 28.228 | 17 | CR G30 – Underwood | |
| Pottawattamie | Neola | 23.228 | 37.382 | 23 | CR L55 – Neola | |
| Pottawattamie | Minden Township | 27.520 | 44.289 | 27 | I-880 west – North Omaha, Sioux City | Former I-680, originally I-80N |
| Pottawattamie | Minden Township | 29.504 | 47.482 | 29 | CR L66 – Minden | |
| Pottawattamie | Shelby | 34.451 | 55.444 | 34 | CR M16 – Shelby | |
| Pottawattamie | Avoca | 40.404 | 65.024 | 40 | US 59 – Avoca, Harlan | |
| Pottawattamie | Walnut | 46.341 | 74.579 | 46 | CR M47 (Antique City Drive) – Walnut | |
| Cass | Brighton Township | 51.750 | 83.284 | 51 | CR M56 – Marne | |
| Cass | Brighton Township | 54.762 | 88.131 | 54 | Iowa 173 – Atlantic, Elk Horn, Kimballton | |
| Cass | Pymosa Township | 57.697 | 92.854 | 57 | CR N16 – Atlantic | |
| Cass | Pymosa Township | 60.708 | 97.700 | 60 | US 6 west / US 71 – Audubon, Villisca, Atlantic | Western end of US 6 overlap |
| Cass | Benton Township | 64.694 | 104.115 | 64 | CR N28 – Wiota | |
| Cass | Grant Township | 70.426 | 113.340 | 70 | Iowa 148 south – Anita, Corning, Exira | |
| Adair | Adair | 75.688 | 121.808 | 75 | CR G30 (White Pole Road) | |
| Adair | Adair | 76.427 | 122.997 | 76 | CR N54 south – Adair | |
| Adair | Casey | 82.585 | 132.908 | 83 | CR N77 (Antique Country Drive) – Casey | |
| Adair | Jefferson Township | 86.357 | 138.978 | 86 | Iowa 25 – Guthrie Center, Greenfield | |
| Adair | Jefferson Township | 88.346 | 142.179 | 88 | CR P20 – Menlo | |
| Adair | Stuart | 93.396 | 150.306 | 93 | CR P28 – Stuart, Panora | |
| Adair–Madison county line | Lincoln–Penn township line | 97.387 | 156.729 | 97 | CR P48 – Dexter | |
| Dallas | Dexter | 100.293 | 161.406 | 100 | CR F60 – Redfield, Dexter | Former US 6 |
| Dallas | Adams Township | 104.170 | 167.645 | 104 | CR P57 – Earlham | |
| Dallas | Adams Township | 106.566 | 171.501 | 106 | CR P58 / CR F90 | |
| Dallas | De Soto | 110.255 | 177.438 | 110 | US 6 east / US 169 – Adel, Winterset | Eastern end of US 6 overlap |
| Dallas | Van Meter | 113.363 | 182.440 | 113 | CR R16 – Van Meter, Dallas Center | |
| Dallas | Waukee | 117.282 | 188.747 | 117 | CR R22 – Waukee, Booneville | |
| Dallas | Waukee | 118.771 | 191.143 | 118 | Grand Prairie Parkway – Waukee | First diverging diamond interchange in Iowa |
| Dallas | West Des Moines | 121.562 | 195.635 | 121 | Jordan Creek Parkway – West Des Moines | |
| Dallas | West Des Moines | 122.517 | 197.172 | 122 | 60th Street – West Des Moines | Eastbound exit and westbound entrance only |
| Polk | West Des Moines | 123.205 | 198.279 | 123A | I-235 east – Des Moines | Signed as I-35 exit 72A westbound |
| Polk | West Des Moines | 123.205 | 198.279 | 123B | I-35 south – Kansas City | Western end of I-35 overlap; no exit number westbound; serves Des Moines International Airport; I-35 exit 72B |
| Polk | West Des Moines | 123.773 | 199.193 | 124 | University Avenue – Clive | |
| Polk | Clive | 124.770 | 200.798 | 125 | US 6 (Hickman Road) – Adel | |
| Polk | Urbandale | 125.777 | 202.418 | 126 | Douglas Avenue – Urbandale | |
| Polk | Urbandale | 126.722 | 203.939 | 127A | Meredith Drive | Eastbound exit and westbound entrance only; opened October 16, 2020 |
| Polk | Urbandale | 127.174 | 204.667 | 127B | Iowa 141 west – Urbandale, Grimes | Signed as exit 127 westbound |
| Polk | Urbandale | 127.956 | 205.925 | 128 | NW 100th Street | Opened October 15, 2018 |
| Polk | Urbandale | 129.150 | 207.847 | 129 | NW 86th Street – Camp Dodge | |
| Polk | Johnston | 131.158 | 211.078 | 131 | Iowa 28 south (Merle Hay Road) – Saylorville Lake | |
| Polk | Saylor Township | 134.949 | 217.179 | 135 | Iowa 415 (2nd Avenue) – Polk City | |
| Polk | Saylor Township | 136.197 | 219.188 | 136 | US 69 (East 14th Street) – Ankeny | |
| Polk | Ankeny | 137.490 | 221.269 | 137 | I-35 north / I-235 west – Des Moines, Minneapolis | Eastern end of I-35 overlap; signed as exits 137A (I-235, left exit WB) and 137B (I-35) |
| Polk | Altoona | 140.336 | 225.849 | 141 | US 65 south – Altoona, Des Moines, Pleasant Hill | Western end of US 65 overlap; US 65 exit 84; serves Des Moines International Airport |
| Polk | Altoona | 141.733 | 228.097 | 142 | US 6 west / US 65 north / Iowa 330 north – Bondurant, Marshalltown | Eastern end of US 65 overlap; western end of US 6 overlap |
| Polk | Altoona–Bondurant line | 143.375 | 230.740 | 143 | Bondurant, Altoona | |
| Polk | Mitchellville | 148.511 | 239.005 | 149 | Mitchellville | |
| Jasper | Colfax | 154.862 | 249.226 | 155 | Iowa 117 – Mingo, Colfax | |
| Jasper | Sherman Township | 158.535 | 255.137 | 159 | CR F48 – Baxter | |
| Jasper | Newton | 163.969 | 263.883 | 164 | US 6 east / Iowa 14 – Newton, Monroe | Eastern end of US 6 overlap |
| Jasper | Newton | 167.965 | 270.313 | 168 | Iowa Speedway Drive – Newton | |
| Jasper | Buena Vista Township | 172.996 | 278.410 | 173 | Iowa 224 north – Sully, Kellogg | |
| Jasper | Rock Creek Township | 178.733 | 287.643 | 179 | Lynnville, Oakland Acres | |
| Poweshiek | Grinnell | 182.169 | 293.173 | 182 | Iowa 146 – Grinnell, New Sharon | |
| Poweshiek | Malcom | 191.311 | 307.885 | 191 | US 63 – Malcom, Montezuma, Tama | |
| Poweshiek | Bear Creek Township | 196.852 | 316.803 | 197 | Brooklyn | |
| Poweshiek | Warren Township | 201.375 | 324.082 | 201 | Iowa 21 – Belle Plaine, What Cheer | |
| Iowa | Hartford Township | 205.421 | 330.593 | 205 | Victor | |
| Iowa | Sumner Township | 211.474 | 340.334 | 211 | Millersburg, Ladora | |
| Iowa | Sumner Township | 216.483 | 348.396 | 216 | Marengo, North English | |
| Iowa | Williamsburg | 219.491 | 353.237 | 220 | Iowa 149 south / CR V77 north – Williamsburg, Parnell | |
| Iowa | Iowa Township | 224.518 | 361.327 | 225 | US 151 north / CR W21 south – Amana Colonies, Cedar Rapids | |
| Johnson | Oxford Township | 230.072 | 370.265 | 230 | CR W38 – Oxford, Kalona | |
| Johnson | Tiffin | 237.236 | 381.794 | 237 | Tiffin | |
| Johnson | Coralville | 238.698 | 384.147 | 239 | I-380 north / US 218 / Iowa 27 – Cedar Rapids, Mount Pleasant | Avenue of the Saints |
| Johnson | Coralville | 240.237 | 386.624 | 240 | To US 6 (Coral Ridge Avenue) – North Liberty | |
| Johnson | Coralville | 242.592 | 390.414 | 242 | 1st Avenue – VA Medical Center, University of Iowa Hospitals and Clinics and University of Iowa Athletics Complex | Converted into a diverging diamond interchange in 2025 |
| Johnson | Iowa City | 244.878 | 394.093 | 244 | Dubuque Street – Downtown Iowa City | |
| Johnson | Iowa City | 245.975 | 395.858 | 246 | Iowa 1 (Dodge Street) – Solon, Mount Vernon | |
| Johnson | Scott Township | 248.992 | 400.714 | 249 | Herbert Hoover Highway | |
| Cedar | West Branch | 254.200 | 409.095 | 254 | CR X30 – West Branch | Herbert Hoover Presidential Library |
| Cedar | Springdale Township | 259.230 | 417.190 | 259 | West Liberty | |
| Cedar | Iowa Township | 264.482 | 425.643 | 265 | Atalissa | |
| Cedar | Rochester Township | 266.431 | 428.779 | 267 | Iowa 38 north – Tipton, Moscow | Western end of Iowa 38 overlap |
| Cedar | Sugar Creek Township | 270.570 | 435.440 | 271 | US 6 west / Iowa 38 south – Wilton, Muscatine | Eastern end of Iowa 38 overlap; western end of US 6 overlap |
| Cedar | Farmington Township | 276.634 | 445.199 | 277 | Bennett, Durant | |
| Scott | Cleona Township | 279.667 | 450.080 | 280 | CR Y30 – New Liberty, Stockton | |
| Scott | Walcott | 283.902 | 456.896 | 284 | CR Y40 – Walcott, Plain View | |
| Scott | Davenport | 289.560 | 466.002 | 290 | I-280 east / US 6 east / US 61 south – Rock Island, Moline | Eastern end of US 6 overlap; western end of US 61 overlap; left exit westbound |
| Scott | Davenport | 292.517 | 470.760 | 292 | Iowa 130 west (Northwest Boulevard) – Maysville | |
| Scott | Davenport | 295.092 | 474.905 | 295 | US 61 north / US 61 Bus. (Brady Street) – DeWitt, Eldridge | Eastern end of US 61 overlap; signed as exits 295A (south) and 295B (north) |
| Scott | Davenport | 297.428 | 478.664 | 298 | I-74 Local east – Bettendorf, Davenport | I-74 through traffic to Peoria is urged to follow I-80 east around the Quad Cities; western terminus of I-74 |
| Scott | Bettendorf | 300.863 | 484.192 | 301 | Middle Road | |
| Scott | LeClaire | 306.022 | 492.495 | 306 | US 67 / Great River Road – Bettendorf, LeClaire | |
| Mississippi River | | 306.268 | 492.891 | Fred Schwengel Memorial Bridge; Iowa–Illinois state line | | |
| Mississippi River | | 306.268 | 492.891 | | I-80 east – Chicago | Continuation into Illinois |
1.000 mi = 1.609 km; 1.000 km = 0.621 mi: Closed/former; Concurrency terminus; Incomplete access

== See also ==
- 80/35 Music Festival

Interstate 80
| Previous state: Nebraska | Iowa | Next state: Illinois |
