= 1980 Iowa highway transfer of jurisdiction =

Iowa Primary Highway System
- Highways that changed jurisdiction around 1980 Removed highways Renumbered highways Added highways

System information
- Notes: Primary highways in Iowa are generally state-maintained.

Highway names
- Interstates: Interstate X (I-X)
- US Highways: U.S. Highway X (US X)
- State: Highway X (IA X or Iowa X)

System links
- Iowa Primary Highway System; Interstate; US; State; Secondary; Scenic

Beginning in 1979 and lasting through the early 1980s, a series of agreements between the Iowa Department of Transportation and individual county boards of supervisors led to a mass transfer of jurisdiction of several state highways in Iowa. County boards of supervisors were asked to convene functional classification boards in order to review the classification all of the highway miles within each respective county. Control of roads that were classified as trunk roads or trunk collector roads were transferred to the counties, while roads classified as arteries or arterial collectors were transferred to the state department of transportation. The vast majority of transfers took place in 1980.

== Background ==
The 67th Iowa General Assembly passed a bill in 1978 that changed how the state department of transportation (DOT) classified highways and how they were funded throughout the state. The bill enacted an existing framework for county boards of supervisors to create reclassification boards that could appeal to a state board if certain changes to the road network were not satisfactory. The state's road use tax fund, which is the mechanism for allocating funds to the different levels of government for different levels of road, had both its inputs and outputs modified. The general fuel tax was raised from 7 to 8 1/2 cents per US gallon (1.8 to 2.2 ¢/L) for 1978 (equivalent to 34 to 41 cents per US gallon (9.0 to 10.8 ¢/L) in 2024), and to 10 ¢/US gal (2.6 ¢/L) for 1979 (equivalent to 43 ¢/US gal (11 ¢/L) in 2024).

The state was attempting to offset the effects the 1970s energy crisis and the 1973–75 recession which strained state budgets by reducing income due to reduced demand for gasoline and increasing inflation. The idea was for the DOT to save operational money by offloading minor highways to the respective counties. In 1979, Iowa had the 9th largest public road system in the United States with over 113,000 miles (182,000 km) of roadways, 10,000 miles (16,000 km) of which were primary highways, comprising Interstate Highways, U.S. Highways, and state highways. State planners sought to offload nearly one-third of the primary system. Naturally, county officials, whose road budgets were similarly strained, balked at the idea.

The Iowa Code provided a manner for determining the class of a particular highway. Each county was to appoint a three-member board, one of whom was to be a state DOT employee, one a county engineer or supervisor, and the other a municipal leader chosen by a majority of mayors in the county. The board was to classify each mile of roads and streets in the county into one of twelve categories. Only three categories applied to primary highways–freeways and expressways, arterials, and arterial connectors. The freeway-expressway and arterial systems had limits on total mileage, 2,660 and 3,500 miles (4,280 and 5,630 km), respectively. The only other requirement of the reclassification boards was to ensure network continuity between counties. Ultimately, these boards found about 1,000 miles (1,600 km) of minor highways that were on the primary system and 400 miles (640 km) of major highways on the secondary system.

County officials were not keen on the idea of taking over more highway miles from the state when their own road budgets were tight. Clarke County officials sued the state classification board when it suggested the county take over an 11-mile (18 km) portion of U.S. Highway 69 (US 69). They felt the DOT was attempting to dump unwanted highway miles, which were also in poor condition, on a county unwilling to accept them. Some counties felt pressure to accept roads from the state that the DOT had not maintained adequately. Grundy County had some success by reclassifying some roads slated for transfer, such as Iowa Highway 214 (Iowa 214) into Wellsburg. That highway was reclassified as an arterial collector extension, keeping in spirit with an agreement it had with the DOT to maintain the highway until "Interstate 520" was built. Other counties had appeals heard at the DOT headquarters in Ames.

Construction of new highways, such as Interstate 380 (I-380) would cause a chain reaction in other state highways. It was predicted in 1979 that opening I-380 in the Cedar Rapids area would cause Iowa 150 to lose its status as a primary highway because the route ran roughly parallel to the planned Interstate Highway's corridor. Indeed, when I-380 opened to traffic in 1984, Iowa 150 was rerouted away from Cedar Rapids over Iowa 101 to Vinton. One section of Iowa 150 along Collins Road in Cedar Rapids was still classified as an arterial connector; it became Iowa 100.

One provision in the Iowa Code required whichever agency maintained a section of highway previously to either repair the highway in question or to pay an appropriate amount of money equal to the costs of repairing the road to the agency receiving the road. In Johnson County, state and county officials had difficulty reaching an agreement on a former segment of Iowa 1, by then renumbered Iowa 979. County officials wanted the state to take over County Road W66 (CR W66) from I-80 to the west overlook of Coralville Lake. The state countered with an offer to pay to upgrade Iowa 979 as well as have the county take over three other highways in the county. The two sides were not any closer 18 months later when the DOT was ready to open a new four-lane US 218 south of Iowa City. The routes for which no agreement could be made were ultimately kept by the DOT and assigned new route numbers, as was the case with Iowa 979.

== Routes removed ==
Lengths represent the distances removed from the state highway system

Number	Length (mi)	Length (km)	Southern or western terminus	Northern or eastern terminus	Formed	Removed	Notes
Iowa 27	6.86	11.04	Alvord	US 75 near Rock Rapids	1930	1980	
Iowa 42	4.18	6.73	US 275 / Iowa 2 near Sidney	Riverton	1920	1980	
Iowa 43	1.58	2.54	Ringsted	Iowa 15 near Ringsted	1920	1980	
Iowa 47	0.82	1.32	Iowa 14 near Allison	Allison	1951	1980	
Iowa 54	2.99	4.81	Marble Rock	Iowa 14 east of Marble Rock	1920	1980	
Iowa 77	7.80	12.55	Iowa 78 at Richland	Iowa 92 at Keota	1920	2003	Segment into Keota remained
Iowa 79	1.74	2.80	Iowa 2 near Bonaparte	Bonaparte	1920	1980	
Iowa 84	2.13	3.43	The Eastern Iowa Airport	I-380 near Cedar Rapids	1943	1980	
Iowa 86	0.47	0.76	Fertile	Iowa 9 at Fertile	1945	1980	
Iowa 87	4.06	6.53	US 69 west of Elkhart	Elkhart	1920	1983	
Iowa 88	8.01	12.89	US 61 / Iowa 2 in Fort Madison	Iowa 16 in Denmark	1940	1980	
Iowa 89	7.69	12.38	Iowa 141 near Woodward	Iowa 17 in Madrid	1946	1980	Replaced by an extended Iowa 210
Iowa 90	16.32	26.26	I-80 in Dallas County	I-35 in Des Moines	1932	1981	
Iowa 91	4.18	6.73	Ledyard	US 169 near Ledyard	1940	1980	
Iowa 95	3.70	5.95	Carbon	Iowa 148 north of Corning	1932	1983	
Iowa 101	15.56	25.04	US 218 in Vinton	Iowa 150 north of Urbana	1920	1984	Replaced by a relocated Iowa 150
Iowa 102	1.82	2.93	Hawkeye	US 18 near Hawkeye	1920	1980	
Iowa 104	1.53	2.46	Woodburn	US 34 near Woodburn	1927	1980	
Iowa 106	8.98	14.45	Iowa 107 in Clear Lake	US 65 in Mason City	1920	1980	
Iowa 108	1.18	1.90	Delta	Iowa 92 near Delta	1923	1980	
Iowa 112	5.19	8.35	Volga	Iowa 13 near Osborne	1931	1980	
Iowa 114	9.20	14.81	Iowa 92 near West Chester	Iowa 22 at Wellman	1969	1981	Previously Iowa 81
Iowa 119	1.04	1.67	Dorchester	Iowa 76 near Dorchester	1923	1980	
Iowa 120	0.80	1.29	Stanton	US 34 near Stanton	1924	1980	
Iowa 123	0.45	0.72	US 34 near Rome	Rome	1970	1980	
Iowa 125	3.26	5.25	Salem	US 218 near Salem	1924	1981	
Iowa 126	0.97	1.56	US 6 near Mitchellville	Mitchellville	1924	1980	
Iowa 134	4.06	6.53	US 65 near Hampton	Geneva	1935	1980	
Iowa 135	1.96	3.15	Montour	US 30 near Montour	1954	1980	
Iowa 152	1.31	2.11	US 34 near Murray	Murray	1926	1980	
Iowa 155	3.05	4.91	Nodaway	US 34 near Nodaway	1933	1980	
Iowa 156	0.33	0.53	Bussey city limits	Bussey	—	2003	Turned over within city limits
Iowa 159	1.83	2.95	Iowa 92 near Harper	Harper	1929	1980	
Iowa 166	0.57	0.92	Hastings	US 34 near Hastings	1930	1980	
Iowa 167	3.21	5.17	Doon	US 75 near Doon	1930	1980	
Iowa 168	2.70	4.35	Iowa 83 near Minden	Shelby	1930	1980	
Iowa 171	1.05	1.69	Elberon	Iowa 21 near Elberon	1935	1980	
Iowa 172	4.23	6.81	Elgin	US 18 in Clermont	1930	1980	
Iowa 177	3.20	5.15	Iowa 9 near Osage	Elgin	1937	1980	
Iowa 178	0.98	1.58	Iowa 9 near Little Rock	Little Rock	1930	1980	
Iowa 179	0.76	1.22	US 69 near Klemme	Klemme	1930	1980	
Iowa 180	2.46	3.96	Hayesville	Iowa 149 near Hayesville	1930	1980	
Iowa 186	3.27	5.26	US 34 near Prescott	Prescott	1930	1980	
Iowa 189	1.00	1.61	Bridgewater	Iowa 92 north or Bridgwater	1930	1980	
Iowa 190	7.46	12.01	Fairbank	Iowa 150 near Oelwein	1931	1980	Replaced by Iowa 281
Iowa 198	0.43	0.69	Garrison	Garrison city limits	—	2003	Turned over within city limits
Iowa 199	0.54	0.87	Van Horne city limits	Van Horne	—	2003	Turned over within city limits
Iowa 200	0.59	0.95	Keystone city limits	Keystone	—	2003	Turned over within city limits
Iowa 203	8.78	14.13	Terril	Iowa 9 near Superior	1920	1980	
Iowa 213	3.72	5.99	Blakesburg	US 34 north or Blakesburg	1931	1980	
Iowa 216	1.70	2.74	Iowa 5	Exline	1931	1981	
Iowa 219	1.53	2.46	Iowa 9 near Lake Park	Lake Park	1931	1980	
Iowa 221	2.44	3.93	US 69 near Story City	I-35 near Story City	—	2003	Segment from I-35 to Roland remained
Iowa 222	14.72	23.69	Iowa 15 near Ottosen	Livermore	1931	1980	
Iowa 226	10.78	17.35	US 18 near Wesley	Titonka	1931	1980	
Iowa 231	1.83	2.95	Iowa 10 near Ireton	Ireton	1931	1981	
Iowa 232	1.99	3.20	Earlham	I-80 near Earlham	1931	1980	
Iowa 237	1.23	1.98	Ocheyedan	Iowa 9 near Ocheyedan	1931	1981	
Iowa 241	0.99	1.59	Readlyn	Iowa 3 near Readlyn	1931	1980	
Iowa 243	7.97	12.83	Iowa 140 near Kingsley	Pierson	1931	1980	
Iowa 244	1.96	3.15	Henderson	US 59	1931	1980	
Iowa 246	3.26	5.25	US 61 in Zwingle	La Motte	1931	1980	
Iowa 248	0.49	0.79	Independence State Hospital	US 20 in Independence	1931	1980	
Iowa 250	0.59	0.95	Lakota	US 169 / Iowa 9 near Lakota	1932	1980	
Iowa 251	1.71	2.75	St. Charles	I-35 near St. Charles	1932	1980	
Iowa 254	7.91	12.73	Iowa 9 near Buffalo Center	MN 254 near Rake	1969	1980	
Iowa 255	2.26	3.64	Orchard	US 218 near Orchard	1932	1980	
Iowa 256	0.80	1.29	Iowa 17 near Corwith	Corwith	1932	1980	
Iowa 259	0.45	0.72	Tingley city limits	Tingley	—	2003	Turned over within city limits
Iowa 262	1.99	3.20	US 69 near Galt	Galt	1933	1980	
Iowa 263	2.02	3.25	Coulter	Latimer	1933	1980	Double spur route with Iowa 3
Iowa 264	2.39	3.85	Linn Grove	Iowa 10 near Linn Grove	1933	1980	
Iowa 266	0.12	0.19	Weldon city limits	Weldon	—	2003	Turned over within city limits
Iowa 267	1.19	1.92	Iowa 93 near Randalia	Randalia	1934	1980	
Iowa 269	3.01	4.84	Iowa 16 near Stockport	Stockport	1934	1980	
Iowa 270	1.80	2.90	Iowa 16 near Hillsboro	Hillsboro	1934	1980	
Iowa 271	0.84	1.35	Iowa 4 near Yale	Yale	1935	1980	
Iowa 277	6.24	10.04	Numa	Iowa 5 near Centerville	1935	1980	
Iowa 278	2.05	3.30	Rathbun	Iowa 5 near Rathbun	1935	1980	
Iowa 279	0.72	1.16	Atkins city limits	Atkins	—	2003	Turned over within city limits
Iowa 284	5.58	8.98	Aurora	Iowa 187 at Lamont	1935	1980	
Iowa 287	0.42	0.68	Newhall city limits	Newhall	—	2003	Turned over within city limits
Iowa 288	4.58	7.37	US 65 near Manly	Plymouth	1935	1980	
Iowa 289	6.14	9.88	Alta Vista	US 63 near Lourdes	1935	1980	
Iowa 290	1.99	3.20	Farmersburg	Iowa 13 near Farmersburg	1935	1980	
Iowa 291	1.01	1.63	Low Moor	US 30 near Low Moor	1935	1979	
Iowa 292	3.17	5.10	Linden	Iowa 44	1935	1980	
Iowa 293	1.42	2.29	Iowa 90 near Van Meter	Van Meter	1935	1980	
Iowa 295	5.09	8.19	Westgate	Iowa 150 near Maynard	1935	1980	
Iowa 296	4.44	7.15	CR C24 near Wadena	Iowa 56 near Wadena	1935	1980	
Iowa 302	3.00	4.83	Thor	Iowa 3 near Thor	1935	1980	
Iowa 303	3.51	5.65	US 34 near Fairfield	Libertyville	1935	1981	
Iowa 304	1.59	2.56	Iowa 78 near Ollie	Ollie	1935	1980	
Iowa 309	2.32	3.73	Beacon	Iowa 137 in Oskaloosa	1935	1980	
Iowa 311	0.55	0.89	Liscomb	Liscomb city limits	1935	1989	Turned over within city limits
Iowa 312	5.70	9.17	Iowa 9 near Riceville	McIntire	1935	1980	
Iowa 313	2.03	3.27	Melvin city limits	Melvin	1935	2002	
Iowa 317	0.81	1.30	US 65 near Zearing	Zearing	1935	1980	
Iowa 318	5.51	8.87	Clutier	Iowa 21 near Clutier	1935	1980	
Iowa 319	0.50	0.80	Gravity	Iowa 148 at Gravity	1935	1980	
Iowa 323	3.74	6.02	Iowa 17 near Woolstock	Woolstock	1935	1980	
Iowa 325	0.47	0.76	Spillville	Spillville city limits	1935	2003	Turned over within city limits
Iowa 326	2.18	3.51	Bristow	Iowa 3 near Bristow	1935	1981	
Iowa 328	2.29	3.69	US 20 near Galva	Galva	1935	1980	
Iowa 329	4.85	7.81	US 169 at Boxholm	Pilot Mound	1935	1980	
Iowa 332	1.00	1.61	Pilot Knob State Park	Iowa 9 near Forest City	1935	1980	Park access road
Iowa 334	1.87	3.01	US 63 near Frederika	Frederika	1935	1980	
Iowa 335	0.64	1.03	Iowa 141 near Dawson	Dawson	1935	1980	
Iowa 336	2.48	3.99	Iowa 150 near Rowley	Rowley	1936	1980	
Iowa 337	3.36	5.41	Iowa 9 near Grafton	Grafton	1936	1980	
Iowa 342	0.95	1.53	Iowa 141 near Jamaica	Jamaica	1936	1980	
Iowa 343	1.01	1.63	Iowa 333 near Northboro	Northboro	1937	1980	
Iowa 351	0.86	1.38	Rembrandt	US 71 near Rembrandt	1938	1981	
Iowa 352	0.75	1.21	US 71 near Truesdale	Truesdale	1938	1981	
Iowa 353	0.35	0.56	Rowan	Iowa 3 at Rowan	1938	1980	
Iowa 356	6.37	10.25	Packwood	Iowa 1 near Packwood	1938	1981	
Iowa 358	1.55	2.49	Whittemore	US 18 / Iowa 15 near Whittemore	1938	1980	
Iowa 362	1.17	1.88	Macedonia	US 59 near Macedonia	1938	1980	
Iowa 364	0.74	1.19	Cota Creek	Harpers Ferry	1938	2003	Turned over within city limits
Iowa 365	1.07	1.72	Tracy	Iowa 92 near Tracy	1939	1980	
Iowa 367	3.39	5.46	Rutland	US 169 near Humboldt	1942	1980	
Iowa 369	5.54	8.92	Iowa 2 near Moulton	Unionville	1942	1980	
Iowa 374	7.99	12.86	US 71 near Sioux Rapids	Webb	1942	1980	
Iowa 377	0.51	0.82	Harbor Drive in Sioux City	Iowa 970 in Sergeant Bluff	1942	1980	Airport access road
Iowa 379	4.59	7.39	Joice	Iowa 105 near Lake Mills	1942	1980	
Iowa 381	0.67	1.08	Iowa 254 near Rake	Rake	1954	1980	
Iowa 387	0.52	0.84	Davenport Municipal Airport	US 61 3 miles north of Davenport	1951	1979	
Iowa 388	0.35	0.56	Calumet	US 59 at Calumet	1946	1980	
Iowa 390	0.74	1.19	Iowa 10 near Marathon	Marathon	1946	1980	
Iowa 393	2.40	3.86	Ionia	US 18 near Ionia	1948	1980	
Iowa 394	1.72	2.77	Iowa 2 near Denmark	Iowa Army Ammunition Plant southern entrance	1948	1980	
Iowa 395	0.53	0.85	Melbourne	Iowa 330 near Melbourne	1948	1983	
Iowa 396	0.52	0.84	Iowa 175 near Farnhamville	Farnhamville	1954	1980	
Iowa 398	1.24	2.00	Brooklyn	US 6 near Brooklyn	1956	1980	
Iowa 400	4.54	7.31	Truro	I-35 near Truro	1958	1980	
Iowa 403	0.70	1.13	Cushing	US 20 near Cushing	1958	1980	
Iowa 405	0.24	0.39	Lone Tree	Lone Tree city limits	1958	2003	Turned over within city limits
Iowa 408	7.40	11.91	US 169 near Lu Verne	Lu Verne	1957	1980	
Iowa 412	4.72	7.60	US 63 in Waterloo	US 218 in Waterloo	1960	1983	San Marnan Drive in Waterloo
Iowa 413	3.95	6.36	US 20 in Fort Dodge	Fort Dodge Municipal Airport	1960	1980	
Iowa 424	0.44	0.71	Britt city limits	US 18 near Britt	1961	1980	
Iowa 426	0.52	0.84	Iowa 92 near Rose Hill	Rose Hill	1960	1980	
Iowa 428	1.21	1.95	Anamosa	US 151 / Iowa 64 at Anamosa	1965	1980	
Iowa 924	4.00	6.44	Webster–Greene County Line	Iowa 175 near Farnhamville	1980	1982	
Iowa 933	0.74	1.19	Iowa 141 in Perry	Iowa 141 in Perry	1976	1984	Former section of Iowa 141
Iowa 934	1.07	1.72	US 61 near Burlington	US 61 near Burlington	1976	1980	Former section of US 61; now Memorial Park Road
Iowa 935	0.77	1.24	—	—	1976	1981	Former section of US 34 parallel to Business US 34 in Burlington
Iowa 938	1.57	2.53	Iowa 947 near Manchester	Manchester Fish Hatchery	1976	1980	Former Iowa 116
Iowa 939	6.76	10.88	US 65	Iowa 2 near Corydon	1976	1980	Former section of Iowa 2
Iowa 940	2.51	4.04	—	—	1976	1980	Former sections of Iowa 2
Iowa 941	2.99	4.81	County Road J18 in Moravia	Iowa 5 near Moravia	1976	1980	Former section of Iowa 5
Iowa 942	5.70	9.17	Iowa 5 near Moravia	County Road J18 in Moravia	1976	1980	Former sections of Iowa 5
Iowa 943	0.69	1.11	—	—	1974	1980	Former section of Iowa 13 in Central City
Iowa 944	0.99	1.59	Iowa 13 in Manchester	Iowa 13 in Manchester	1976	1980	Former section of Iowa 13
Iowa 946	2.72	4.38	Luana city limits	US 18 / US 52 in Monona	1976	1980	Former section of US 18 / US 52 concurrency; two sections
Iowa 947	23.75	38.22	Iowa 187	Dyersville city limits	1976	1981	Former section of US 20
Iowa 951	2.65	4.26	US 34 west of Osceola	US 34 near Osceola	1976	1980	Former section of US 34
Iowa 952	0.18	0.29	—	—	1978	1982	Former section of US 67 north of Clinton
Iowa 953	0.89	1.43	Iowa 38 near Muscatine	Iowa 38 in Muscatine	1976	1980	Former section of Iowa 38
Iowa 959	1.27	2.04	US 65 / US 69 in Des Moines	Des Moines city limits	1970	1981	Former section of US 65 / US 69 concurrency
Iowa 960	1.58	2.54	Clarinda city limits	Iowa 2 near Clarinda	1973	1982	Former section of Iowa 2
Iowa 961	0.56	0.90	Villisca city limits	US 71 near Villisca	1976	1980	Former section of US 71
Iowa 965	3.29	5.29	—	—	1976	1980	Former section of US 52
Iowa 969	0.52	0.84	US 169 near Burt	Burt	1976	1980	former Iowa 422
Iowa 971	10.78	17.35	Iowa 2	US 59 in Shenandoah	1975	1979	Former section of Iowa 2
Iowa 972	10.17	16.37	Iowa 92 / US 169 in Winterset	US 169	1974	1980	Former section of US 169
Iowa 973	1.49	2.40	Iowa 92 in Winterset	Iowa 972 in Winterset	1976	1980	Former section of Iowa 92
Iowa 976	2.00	3.22	US 218	Mount Pleasant city limits	1974	1980	Former section of US 218; formerly Iowa 972
Iowa 980	0.77	1.24	US 34 near Ottumwa	Ottumwa city limits	1967	1980	Former section of US 34; formerly US 34 Alternate
Iowa 981	0.44	0.71	Iowa 150 near Fayette	Fayette city limits	1967	1980	Former section of Iowa 150; formerly Iowa 991
Iowa 983	0.81	1.30	US 34 west of Chariton	US 34 east of Chariton	1967	1980	Former section of US 34; formerly Iowa 995 and Iowa 996
Iowa 984	2.24	3.60	Bettendorf city limits	US 67 in Le Claire	1968	1982	Former section of Iowa 417
Iowa 999	2.22	3.57	Spruce Street in College Springs	Iowa 333 near College Springs	1961	1980	Former section of Iowa 333
Former

== Routes added ==
Number	Length (mi)	Length (km)	Southern or western terminus	Northern or eastern terminus	Formed	Removed	Notes
Iowa 79	5.64	9.08	Geode State Park	US 34 in Middletown	1980	2003	
Iowa 91	4.64	7.47	Iowa 9 in Lyon County	MN 91 at the Minnesota state line	1980	2003	
Iowa 100	2.74	4.41	I-380 in Cedar Rapids	US 151 in Cedar Rapids	1984	current	
Iowa 102	15.96	25.69	Iowa 163 in Pella	US 63 / Iowa 146 in New Sharon	1980	current	
Iowa 115	1.24	2.00	US 34 near Stanton	Viking Lake State Park	1980	2003	
Iowa 134	1.75	2.82	Beed's Lake State Park	Iowa 3 near Hampton	1980	1987	
Iowa 142	20.96	33.73	Iowa 2 in Plano	Iowa 5 near Moravia	1980	2003	
Iowa 152	1.34	2.16	I-35 near Osceola	US 69 at Osceola	1980	2014	
Iowa 186	3.38	5.44	Green Valley State Park	Iowa 25 in Creston	1980	2001	
Iowa 192	4.74	7.63	I-29 / I-80 at Council Bluffs	I-29 at Council Bluffs	1931	2017	Was decommissioned in 1975, but restored in 1980
Iowa 243	0.56	0.90	Black Hawk Lake State Park	US 71 / Iowa 175 near Wall Lake	1980	2003	
Iowa 244	0.68	1.09	I-80 near Neola	Iowa 191 in Neola	1980	2003	
Iowa 362	5.09	8.19	Wilson State Park	I-29 at Loveland	1980	2003	
Iowa 394	10.67	17.17	Route B at St. Francisville, Mo.	US 218 near Donnellson	1980	2005	Replaced by Iowa 27
Iowa 403	0.47	0.76	SD 48 near Akron	Iowa 12 in Akron	1980	2003	
Iowa 428	5.75	9.25	Maquoketa Caves State Park	US 61 near Maquoketa	1980	2003	
Iowa 918	1.12	1.80	Iowa 16 near Eldon	Iowa 16 in Eldon	1984	2003	Former section of Iowa 16
Iowa 919	0.29	0.47	Iowa 363 in Urbana	Walnut Street in Urbana	1984	1995	Former section of Iowa 363
Iowa 920	12.61	20.29	Center Point	Iowa 150 near Urbana	1984	2003	Former section of Iowa 150
Iowa 921	12.47	20.07	Iowa 920 in Center Point	Hiawatha	1984	1985	Former section of Iowa 150
Iowa 922	1.27	2.04	US 61 in Muscatine	Iowa 22 in Muscatine	1984	1986	Former section of US 61; became part of an extended Iowa 38
Iowa 923	4.52	7.27	—	—	1982	2003	Former section of US 218; had three sections
Iowa 925	24.32	39.14	I-80 / US 6 in Adair	US 6 near Dexter	1980	2003	Former section of US 6
Iowa 926	6.63	10.67	US 6 in Altoona	US 6 / Iowa 14 in Newton	1980	1988	Former section of US 6
Iowa 927	19.02	30.61	US 6 / Iowa 38 in Wilton	I-280 / US 6 near Davenport	1980	2003	Former section of US 6
Iowa 928	17.15	27.60	Iowa 17 near Webster City	CR D20 near Williams	1980	2003	Former section of US 20
Iowa 929	0.79	1.27	Murray city limits	Maple Street in Murray	1980	2003	Former section of Iowa 152
Iowa 931	8.47	13.63	I-35 in Ankeny	US 65 in Polk County	1980	2003	
Iowa 935	1.38	2.22	I-29	Mills–Pottawattamie county line	1982	2003	Former section of Iowa 370
Iowa 938	0.46	0.74	Unionville	Unionville city limits	1980	2003	Former section of Iowa 369
Iowa 939	12.37	19.91	Independence	Iowa 187 near Masonville	1980	2003	Former section of US 20
Iowa 942	0.47	0.76	Woodburn	Woodburn city limits	1980	2003	Former section of Iowa 104
Iowa 943	0.43	0.69	Galva	Galva city limits	1980	1987	Former section of Iowa 328
Iowa 944	0.56	0.90	US 61 / Iowa 2 in Fort Madison	Fort Madison city limits	1980	2003	Former section of Iowa 88
Iowa 945	4.61	7.42	I-80 near Altoona	Iowa 931 in Polk County	1980	2003	
Iowa 950	3.35	5.39	US 6 / US 65 in Altoona	Iowa 163 in Pleasant Hill	1980	1994	Now 34th Avenue/56th Street
Iowa 951	3.15	5.07	Carbon city limits	Iowa 148	1983	1993	Former section of Iowa 95
Iowa 960	1.11	1.79	—	—	1982	1986	Former section of US 61
Iowa 985	1.95	3.14	US 52 near Bellevue State Park	US 52 near Bellevue	1980	2003	
Former

== Existing route changes ==
Number	Change in length		Southern or western terminus	Northern or eastern terminus	Formed	Removed	Notes
Number	mi (Note: Calculated by subtracting the 1978 mileage from the 1980 mileage)	km	Southern or western terminus	Northern or eastern terminus	Formed	Removed	Notes
Iowa 21	12.42	19.99	Iowa 149 near Hedrick	Iowa 92 near Delta	1934	current	Extended south from Iowa 92
Iowa 25	-6.99	−11.25	Blockton	Iowa 2 near Benton	1926	current	Continued south to Blockton
Iowa 28	6.18	9.95	Iowa 5 in Des Moines	US 6 in Des Moines	1926	current	Extended north from Iowa 5
Iowa 72	3.16	5.09	Dows	I-35 east of Dows	1920	1986	Extended east from Dows
Iowa 139	-12.25	−19.71	Protivin	Iowa 9 at Cresco	1930	current	Spur route to Protivin removed
Iowa 140	15.55	25.03	Kingsley	Iowa 3 at Remsen	1926	current	Extended north from Kingsley
Iowa 145	3.13	5.04	I-29 near Thurman	Thurman	1931	2003	Extended west from Thurman
Iowa 150	-11.05 (Note: Calculated by subtracting the 1980 mileage from the 1984 mileage)	−17.78	US 151 in Cedar Rapids US 218 at Vinton	Iowa 101 in Benton County Iowa 920 in Benton County	1941	current	Rerouted over Iowa 101 in 1984
Iowa 160	1.24	2.00	US 69 at Ankeny	I-35 at Ankeny	1947	current	Extended east within Ankeny
Iowa 173	11.53	18.56	Iowa 83 near Atlantic	Elk Horn	1930	current	Extended south from Elk Horn
Iowa 210	19.58	31.51	Iowa 141 near Woodward	Slater	1931	current	Rerouted over Iowa 89
Iowa 212	-10.02	−16.13	Iowa 21 near Belle Plaine	US 30 near Chelsea	1934	current	Continued northwest to US 30 until 1980
Iowa 220	-2.20 (Note: Calculated by subtracting the 1980 mileage from the 1982 mileage)	−3.54	Upper South Amana Iowa 149 at Amana	US 6 / Iowa 149 at South Amana East Amana	1931	current	Continued east to East Amana and south to Upper South Amana until 1980
Iowa 223	6.94	11.17	Iowa 330 near Baxter	Baxter	1931	1997	Extended west from Baxter
Iowa 224	9.37	15.08	Kellogg	Iowa 14 near Laurel	1931	current	Extended north from Kellogg in 1980
Iowa 281	17.29	27.83	Dunkerton	Iowa 150 at Oelwein	1935	current	Rerouted over Iowa 190
Iowa 333	-3.77	−6.07	Fremont–Page county line near Northboro I-29 at Hamburg	US 71 near Braddyville US 59 near Northboro	1935	current	Route swap
Former
