= Adair Viaduct =

Historic structure in Iowa, United States

- U.S. National Register of Historic Places
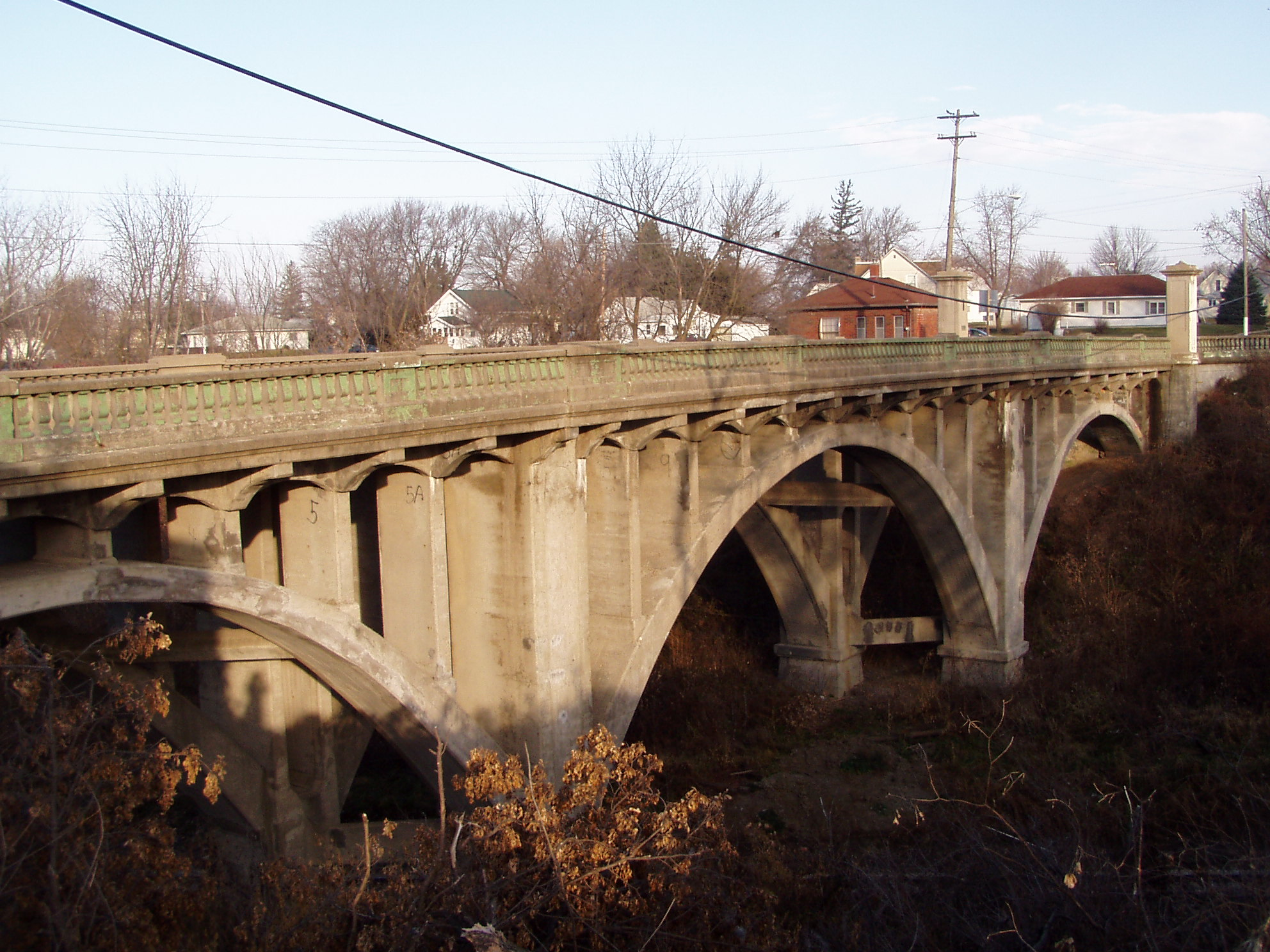

- Location within Iowa Location within the United States
- Location: White Pole Road over the Iowa Interstate Railroad tracks Adair, Iowa
- Coordinates: 41°29′50″N 94°38′36.5″W
- Area: less than one acre
- Built: 1923-1924
- Built by: Federal Bridge Co.
- Architect: Iowa State Highway Commission
- Architectural style: Open spandrel arch
- MPS: Highway Bridges of Iowa MPS
- NRHP reference No.: 98000775
- Added to NRHP: June 25, 1998

The Adair Viaduct is a historic structure located in Adair, Iowa, United States. It spans the Iowa Interstate Railroad tracks for 192 feet (59 m). In 1908 Adair County built the first bridge at this location over the Chicago, Rock Island and Pacific Railroad tracks near the site of the 1873 Jesse James train robbery. Increased traffic by the 1920s necessitated its replacement. The Iowa State Highway Commission designed the three-span open spandrel arch bridge. The Adair County Board of Supervisors awarded the $42,263 to build the bridge to the Federal Bridge Company of Des Moines. It is somewhat unusual in Iowa in that the bridge is not symmetrical. Because it is located over a deep cut the two approach spans at 56 feet (17 m) each are shorter than the main span, which is 80 feet (24 m). The bridge was opened to traffic in June 1924. It was listed on the National Register of Historic Places in 1998.
