= Iowa Highway 25 =

Highway in Iowa

Iowa Highway 25
- Iowa 25 highlighted in red

Route information
- Maintained by Iowa DOT
- Length: 103.419 mi (166.437 km)
- Existed: 1926–present

Major junctions
- South end: Iowa 2 near Clearfield
- US 34 near Creston; Iowa 92 at Greenfield; I-80 / US 6 near Casey; Iowa 44 at Guthrie Center; Iowa 141 near Bayard
- North end: US 30 / CR N65 at Scranton

Location
- Country: United States
- State: Iowa
- Counties: Ringgold; Taylor; Union; Adair; Adams; Guthrie; Greene

Highway system
- Iowa Primary Highway System; Interstate; US; State; Secondary; Scenic
← Iowa 24	→ Iowa 26

Iowa Highway 25 (Iowa 25) is a north–south highway in the southwest and west-central portion of the state. It begins at Iowa 2 seven miles (11 km) south of Clearfield. It heads north along a two-lane road through Creston, Greenfield, and Guthrie Center on its way to its northern end at U.S. Route 30 (US 30) near Scranton.

Iowa 25 was created in 1926 as a replacement for Primary Road No. 16, which was redesignated further east. It originally connected US 30 to US 34 in Creston. In the early 1930s, it was extended south to Blockton by absorbing all of Iowa 184. By the end of the 1930s, the highway reached the Missouri state line, where it ended for over 40 years. In the late 1970s and early 1980s, the highway south of Iowa 2 was turned over to local jurisdictions.

== Route description ==
Iowa 25 begins at a T intersection with Iowa 2 along the Taylor–Ringgold county line south of Clearfield. Eastbound Iowa 2 comes from the south along the county line and turns east into Ringgold County while Iowa 25 heads north from the intersection along the county line. It passes through Clearfield, which lies in Taylor County, and continues north towards the quadripoint of Taylor, Adams, Union, and Ringgold counties (counter-clockwise from the southwest).

North of the quadripoint, Iowa 25 runs along the Adams–Union county line. It crosses the Platte River south of the unincorporated community of Kent. North of Kent, the highway meets U.S. Highway 34 (US 34) and the two routes head east together towards Creston. Shortly after crossing into Union County, the two routes turn to the northeast. In southern Creston, the two routes split with US 34 continuing to the east and Iowa 25 heading north along Sumner Street through the western part of town. Near Southwestern Community College, the route turns to the west along Townline Road. It crosses Summit Lake, a reservoir created by damming the Platte River. West of Summit Lake, the highway turns 90 degrees to the north and passes close to Green Valley State Park.

Iowa 25 crosses into Adair County near the source of the East Nodaway River. At Orient, the highway turns to the west, but west of the town, it turns back to the north. It heads through rural Adair County, occasionally passing a roadside farmhouse. The highway enters Greenfield on the town's eastern side and intersects Iowa 92. The section of the route from Creston to Greenfield is part of the Mormon Pioneer Trail, which roughly marks the trail used by Mormons on their exodus to Utah. North of Greenfield, Iowa 25 passes through land equally as rural as that south of the town. In the northern part of the county, the highway passes Freedom Rock, a large boulder painted every year to honor U.S. veterans and their families. Just north of Freedom Rock, it meets Interstate 80 (I-80) and US 6 at a diamond interchange adjacent to a golf course.

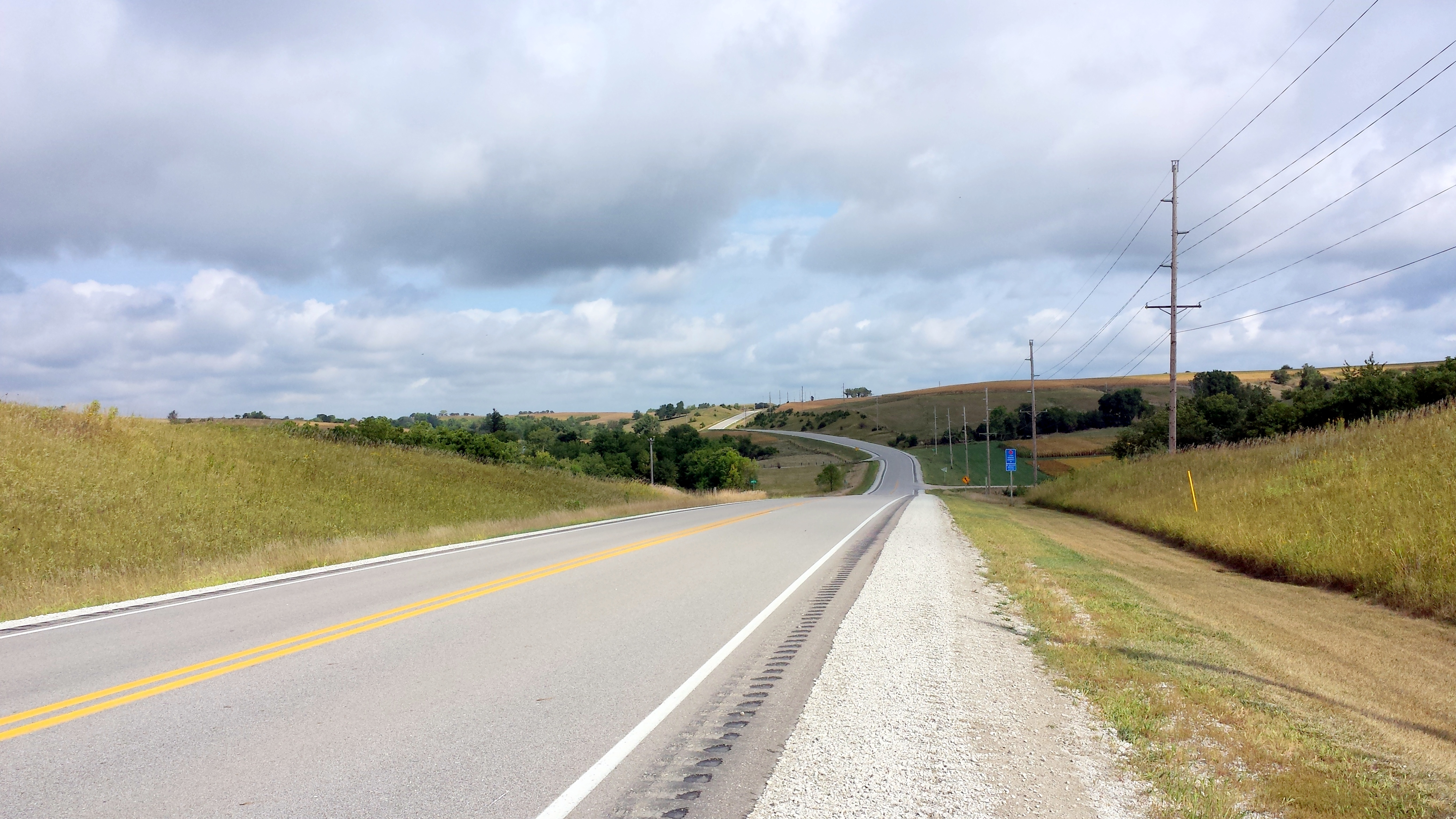
Iowa 25 south of Guthrie Center

North of the interchange, Iowa 25 enters Guthrie County and briefly overlaps part of the White Pole Road, formerly known as Iowa 925, by heading west towards Casey. The concurrency ends as the White Pole Road curves to the southwest while Iowa 25 turns to the north. Continuing north through the rolling hills of Guthrie County, Iowa 25 eases to the west through a series of S curves which aligns the road with 5th Street, the main north–south road in Guthrie Center. Just before it enters the city, the highway crosses the South Raccoon River. In downtown Guthrie Center, it meets Iowa 44 at a four-way stop. North of Guthrie Center, the highway crosses Brushy Creek, a tributary of the South Raccoon River. Near Springbrook State Park, it crosses the Middle Raccoon River. Further north, between the communities of Bayard and Bagley, Iowa 25 intersects Iowa 141. The two routes head west towards Bayard and split on the eastern side of town.

North of Bayard, Iowa 25 crosses into Greene County, the final county through which it passes. The highway heads due north through farmland, passing a few houses along the way to Scranton. Just south of Scranton, it picks up the Lincoln Highway Heritage Byway, a designation it carries to its end. The route goes through the west side of Scranton and continues north to its endpoint at US 30. North of US 30, the roadway becomes County Road N65 (CR N65), which carries the Lincoln Highway Heritage Byway.

== History ==
The original Primary Road No. 25 was designated with the rest of the Iowa Primary Highway System in 1920. It spanned 20 miles (32 km) from Adel to Winterset. This designation only lasted a few years; it was absorbed by Primary Road No. 16 in 1926. When the Adel–to–Winterset route changed numbers in 1926, it was not paved at all, but the segment in Madison County was graded, the first step in becoming a paved road.

The second iteration of Iowa 25 was created in 1925 during the time when the Iowa State Highway Commission was designating the new U.S. Highway System on the state's primary road network. In order to avoid driver confusion, the commission reorganized various route numbers to simplify the system and to remove any duplicated numbers, i.e. US 30 and Primary Road No. 30. Iowa 25 was allocated along a section of former Primary Road No. 16 from Scranton to Creston. Iowa 16 was rerouted to the east, absorbing all of the previous incarnation of Primary Road No. 25.

A few years later, the highway commission created Iowa 184, which ran from US 34 south to Blockton. In early 1933, Iowa 25 was extended southward along US 34 and absorbed all of Iowa 184. In 1938, it was extended an additional four miles (6.4 km) to the Missouri state line. Iowa 357 was created as a short spur route into Blockton.

Iowa 25 stayed largely the same for over 40 years. By 1980, it was truncated at County Road J55 (formerly Iowa 357) near Blockton. Two years later, it trimmed back to its northern junction with Iowa 2, where it remains today.

== Major intersections ==
County	Location	mi	km	Destinations	Notes
Taylor–Ringgold county line	Gay–Benton township line	0.000	0.000	Iowa 2 – Mount Ayr, Bedford	
Adams–Union county line	Grant–Platte township line	18.421	29.646	US 34 west – Corning	Southern end of US 34 overlap
Union	Creston	26.067	41.951	US 34 east (Taylor Street) / Mormon Pioneer National Historic Trail – Osceola	Northern end of US 34 overlap
Adair	Greenfield	47.619	76.635	Iowa 92 / Mormon Pioneer National Historic Trail – Fontanelle, Winterset	
Adair	Jefferson Township	60.915	98.033	I-80 / US 6 – Des Moines, Council Bluffs	
Guthrie	Guthrie Center	75.560	121.602	Iowa 44 (State Street) – Panora, Hamlin	
Guthrie	Dodge Township	87.580	140.946	Iowa 141 east – Bayard	Southern end of Iowa 141 overlap
Guthrie	Bayard	90.592	145.794	Iowa 141 west – Coon Rapids	Northern end of Iowa 141 overlap
Greene	Scranton Township	103.419	166.437	US 30 / CR N65 – Jefferson, Carroll	
1.000 mi = 1.609 km; 1.000 km = 0.621 mi: Concurrency terminus

== Related routes ==
- Iowa 184 was the 27-mile-long (43 km) route that connected Blockton to US 34. It was designated in 1931 and absorbed into Iowa 25 two years later.
- Iowa 357 was a short spur that entered Blockton after Iowa 25 was extended to the Missouri state line in 1938. It was turned over to Taylor County in 1964.
