= Iowa Highway 90 =

Former state highway in Iowa

Iowa Highway 90
- Iowa 90 prior to its decommissioning in red

Route information
- Maintained by Iowa State Highway Commission
- Length: 16.32 mi (26.26 km)
- Existed: 1932–1981

Major junctions
- West end: I-80 near Earlham
- East end: I-35 near West Des Moines

Location
- Country: United States
- State: Iowa
- Counties: Dallas; Polk

Highway system
- Iowa Primary Highway System; Interstate; US; State; Secondary; Scenic
← Iowa 89	→ Iowa 91

Iowa Highway 90 (Iowa 90) was a state highway in central Iowa. The highway was in service to traffic from 1932 through 1981 and took several forms over the years. It began as a spur route from Des Moines to Commerce, now part of West Des Moines. At its greatest extent, it extended from Atlantic to Newton along the historical routing of U.S. Highway 6 (US 6). From 1966 through 1981, the highway existed in its final form—from Interstate 80 (I-80) between Earlham and DeSoto to I-35 on the southern outskirts of West Des Moines.

== Route description ==
Iowa 90 began at an interchange with I-80 between Earlham and DeSoto. The Interstate Highway at this location ran in a south-southwest–to–north-northeast orientation. The Iowa 90 roadway curved northward at the interchange and continued as County Road P58 (CR P58). The highway straightened out and headed due east and intersected US 169 about one mile (1.6 km) south of DeSoto. Just before this intersection it passed over a line of the Rock Island Railroad. It continued east along a section line until it met CR R16 on the southern edge of Van Meter. Prior to 1980, CR R16 was called Iowa 293. The highway eased slightly to the north, putting traffic on a north-northeasterly vector parallel to the Rock Island line. It crossed the Raccoon River just west of Booneville. It entered Polk County to the southwest of West Des Moines. The roadway curved around to cross to the north side of the railroad tracks at a perpendicular level crossing. From there, it continued a short distance to a cloverleaf interchange with I-35. The roadway continued into West Des Moines, and ultimately Des Moines, as Grand Avenue.

== Major intersections ==
County	Location	mi	km	Destinations	Notes
Dallas	Adams Township	0.00	0.00	I-80 – Des Moines, Council Bluffs	
Dallas	Adams–Van Meter township line	3.50	5.63	US 169 – Adel, Winterset	
Dallas	Van Meter	7.01	11.28	CR R16 – Van Meter	Former Iowa 293
Polk	West Des Moines	16.32	26.26	I-35 – Des Moines, Kansas City	
1.000 mi = 1.609 km; 1.000 km = 0.621 mi
