= Iowa Highway 925 =

State highway in Iowa, United States

Iowa Highway 925
- White Pole Road
- Iowa 925 highlighted in red

Route information
- Maintained by Iowa DOT
- Length: 26.259 mi (42.260 km)
- Existed: 1981–2003

Major junctions
- West end: I-80 / US 6 at Adair
- East end: US 6 near Dexter

Location
- Country: United States
- State: Iowa
- Counties: Adair; Guthrie; Dallas

Highway system
- Iowa Primary Highway System; Interstate; US; State; Secondary; Scenic
← Iowa 922	→ Iowa 926

Iowa Highway 925 (Iowa 925) was a state highway that was an alternative to Interstate 80 (I-80) between Adair and Dexter. It began at exit 75 along I-80 in Adair and traveled through Casey, Menlo, and Stuart before ending at U.S. Highway 6 (US 6) east of Dexter. The highway was designated in 1981 when US 6 was relocated onto I-80 between Adair and Dexter. It ceased to exist on July 1, 2003, when the Iowa Department of Transportation relinquished control of more than 700 miles (1,100 km) of local highways to county maintenance.

== Route description ==
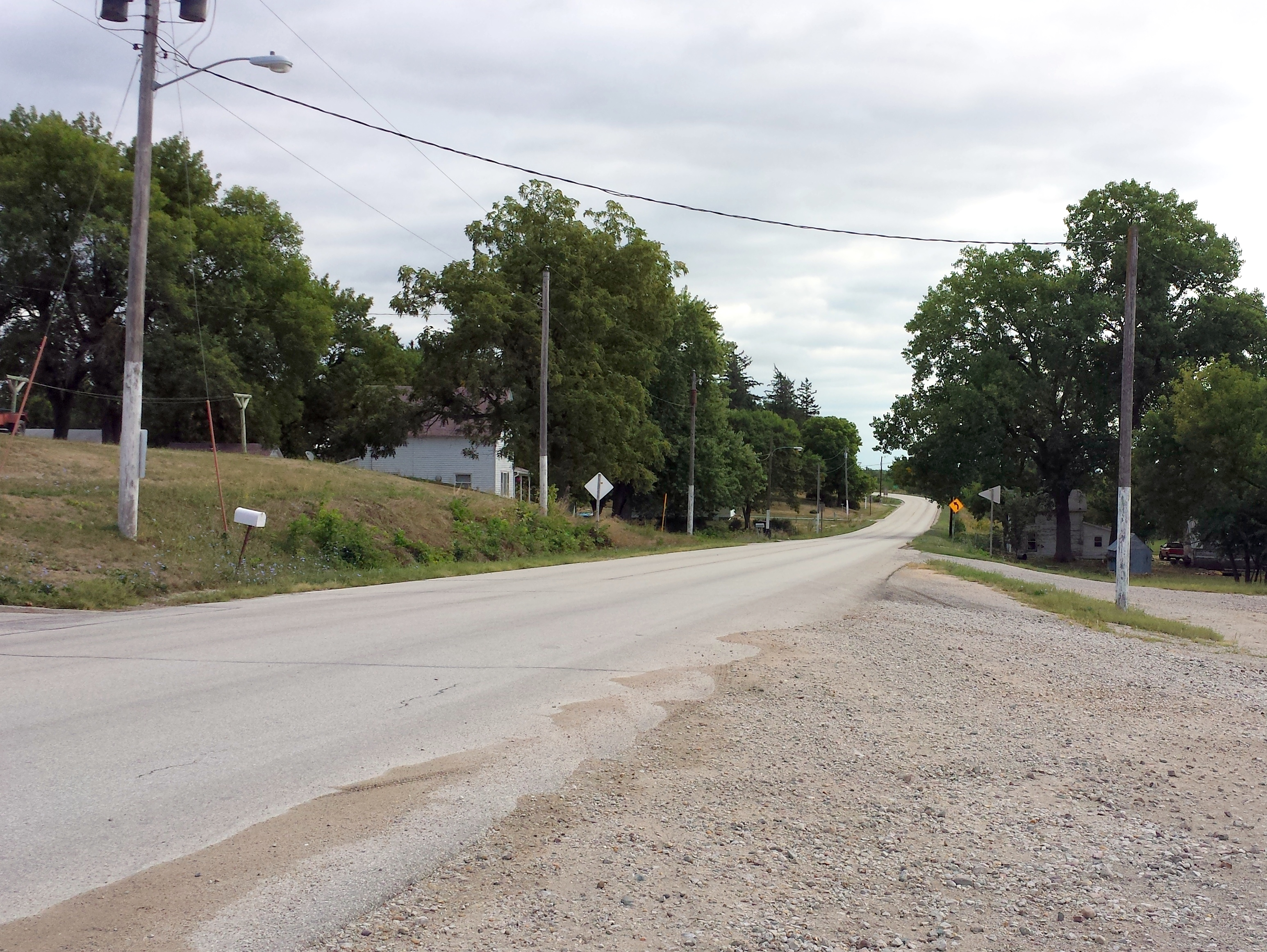
The White Pole Road in Casey

Iowa 925 began in Adair at exit 75 along I-80 / US 6. It crossed the Adair Viaduct over the Iowa Interstate Railroad (IAIS) as it traveled north through the town. North of Adair, the highway took a sharp turn to the east and headed due east for a few miles. Just west of Casey, the railroad approached the highway's south side and the two closely paralleled each other for a few miles. East of Casey, the highway met Iowa 25, which came from Guthrie Center to the north. The two routes headed east together on a viaduct over the IAIS. Shortly thereafter, Iowa 25 split away to the south toward Greenfield. As it continued east past Menlo, Iowa 925 was rejoined by the railroad, which crossed over the road to again flank the road's south side. Through Stuart, the highway followed Front Street, which represented the Adair–Guthrie county line. The IAIS line approached the highway again and guided the road toward Dexter. Iowa 925 ended at an intersection with US 6 just north of exit 100 along I-80.

== History ==
Iowa 925 was created in 1981 after US 6 was relocated onto I-80 between Adair and Dexter. The designation was applied to the former routing of US 6. In 2002, more than 700 miles (1,100 km) of low-traffic state highways, including Iowa 925, were identified by the Iowa Department of Transportation (DOT) because they primarily served local traffic. Typically, when the DOT wished to transfer a road to a county or locality, both parties had to agree to terms and the DOT would have to either improve the road or give money to the other party to maintain the road. However, with the significant mileage the DOT wished to turn over, the Iowa General Assembly passed a law which granted the DOT a one-time exemption from the transfer rules effective July 1, 2003. Iowa 925 was replaced by County Road N54 (CR N54) from Adair to the sharp curve north of town and by CR F65 from the curve through Dexter. US 6 was also removed from the road at which Iowa 925 ended and was rerouted further along I-80.

== Major intersections ==
County	Location	mi	km	Destinations	Notes
Adair	Adair	0.000	0.000	I-80 / US 6 (Exit 75) – Des Moines, Omaha	
Guthrie	Thompson Township	10.442	16.805	Iowa 25 north – Guthrie Center	Western end of Iowa 25 overlap
Guthrie	Beaver Township	12.356	19.885	Iowa 25 south – Greenfield	Eastern end of Iowa 25 overlap
Adair	No major junctions				
Guthrie	No major junctions				
Dallas	Union Township	26.259	42.260	US 6 to I-80 (Exit 100) – Redfield	
1.000 mi = 1.609 km; 1.000 km = 0.621 mi: Concurrency terminus
