= Lake Manawa =

- Location within Iowa
- Location: Pottawattamie County, Iowa
- Coordinates: 41°12′22″N 95°51′31″W
- Type: lake
- Basin countries: United States
- Surface area: 1.158 mi^{2} (3.00 km^{2})
- Surface elevation: 968 ft (295 m)

Lake Manawa is a lake located in Council Bluffs, Iowa, in the United States. It was formed from a Missouri River flood in 1881. It is the closest lake to Omaha, Nebraska and surrounding metro area which allows motor boating, water skiing, and wakeboarding. Lake Area: 1.158 square miles (3.00 km^{2})
