= Penn Township, Madison County, Iowa =

Township in Madison County, Iowa

Coordinates: 41.460°N 94.185°W

Penn Township is a township in Madison County, Iowa, in the United States.

== History ==
Penn Township was established in 1858.
