= Bear Creek Township, Poweshiek County, Iowa =

Township in Iowa, USA

Coordinates: 41°44′N 92°28′W

Bear Creek Township is a township in Poweshiek County, Iowa, United States.
