= Sherman Township, Jasper County, Iowa =

Township in Jasper County, Iowa

Coordinates: 41.7400°N 93.1675°W

Sherman Township is a township in Jasper County, Iowa, United States.

== History ==
Sherman Township was established in 1868.
