= Farmington Township, Cedar County, Iowa =

Township in Iowa, US

Farmington Township, Cedar County
- Township
- Coordinates: 41°36′40″N 90°56′59″W
- Country: United States
- State: Iowa
- County: Cedar

Area
  - Total: 36.27 sq mi (93.95 km^{2})
  - Land: 36.27 sq mi (93.95 km^{2})
  - Water: 0 sq mi (0 km^{2})
- Elevation: 758 ft (231 m)

Population (2000)
  - Total: 2,137
  - Density: 59/sq mi (22.7/km^{2})
- FIPS code: 19-91317
- GNIS feature ID: 467824

Farmington Township is one of seventeen townships in Cedar County, Iowa, United States. As of the 2000 census, its population was 2,137.

== Geography ==
Farmington Township covers an area of 36.27 square miles (93.9 km^{2}) and contains one incorporated settlement, Durant. According to the USGS, it contains one cemetery, Farmington.
