= Hartford Township, Iowa County, Iowa =

Township in Iowa County, Iowa, U.S.

Coordinates: 41.7322°N 92.2411°W

Hartford Township is a township in Iowa County, Iowa, United States.

== History ==
Hartford Township was established in 1854.
