= Jefferson Township, Adair County, Iowa =

Township in Iowa, US

Jefferson Township, Adair County
- Township
- Coordinates: 41°27′22″N 094°24′38″W
- Country: United States
- State: Iowa
- County: Adair

Area
  - Total: 35.50 sq mi (91.95 km^{2})
  - Land: 35.4 sq mi (91.7 km^{2})
  - Water: 0.093 sq mi (0.24 km^{2})
- Elevation: 1,237 ft (377 m)

Population (2020)
  - Total: 130
  - Density: 3.7/sq mi (1.4/km^{2})
- Time zone: UTC-6 (CST)
  - Summer (DST): UTC-5 (CDT)
- FIPS code: 19-92199
- GNIS feature ID: 0468127

Jefferson Township is one of seventeen townships in Adair County, Iowa, USA. At the 2020 census, its population was 130.

== History ==
Jefferson Township was organized in 1855.

== Geography ==
Jefferson Township covers an area of 35.5 square miles (92 km^{2}) and contains no incorporated settlements. According to the USGS, it contains two cemeteries: Jefferson and Loucks Grove.
