= Iowa Highway 316 =

State highway in Iowa, United States

Iowa Highway 316
- Iowa 316 highlighted in red

Route information
- Maintained by Iowa DOT
- Length: 5.183 mi (8.341 km)
- Existed: June 4, 1935–present

Major junctions
- South end: Iowa 5 near Swan
- North end: East city limits of Runnells

Location
- Country: United States
- State: Iowa
- Counties: Marion; Warren; Polk

Highway system
- Iowa Primary Highway System; Interstate; US; State; Secondary; Scenic
← Iowa 296	→ Iowa 330

Iowa Highway 316 (Iowa 316) is a 5.183-mile-long (8.341 km) spur route in central Iowa. The route begins at Iowa Highway 5 south of Swan and ends at the eastern city limits of Runnells. Prior to 2003, Iowa 316 extended north to Iowa Highway 163 north of Runnells, but that portion was turned over to Polk County. The highway's primary purpose is a crossing of the Des Moines River south of Runnells.

== Route description ==
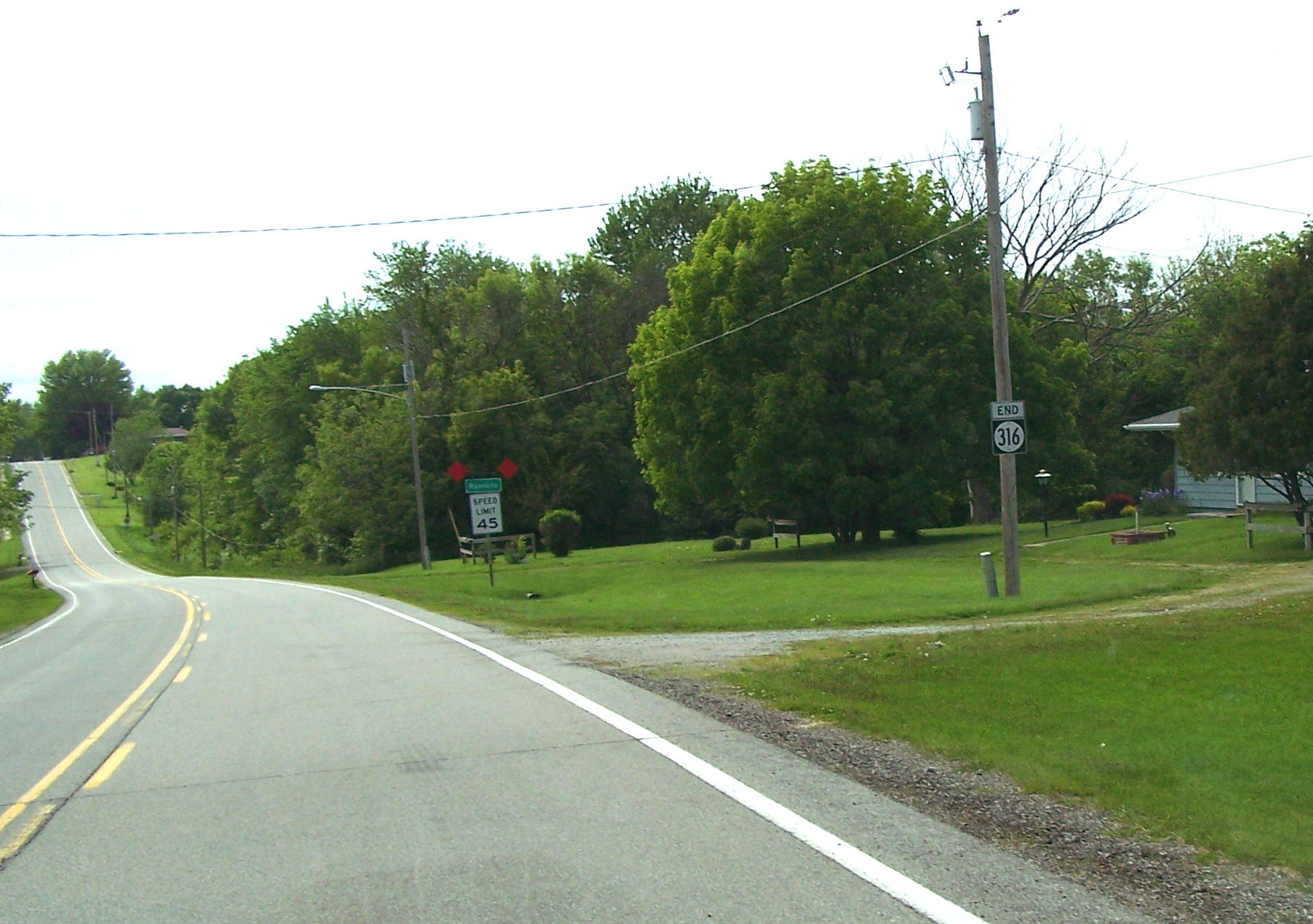
Iowa 316 ends at the Runnells city limits

Iowa 316 begins at an intersection with Iowa Highway 5 south of Swan. The first one-sixth mile (270 m) are in Warren County, while the next two and a third miles (3.8 km) of the road form the Warren/Marion county border. it crosses over a BNSF Railway line and turns into Warren County. For the rest of its length, the highway closely parallels these railroad tracks. Iowa 316 in Warren County is bordered to the south and east by the Middle River and to the north and east by the Des Moines River, and occasionally, Lake Red Rock. The area north of the highway serves as an overflow basin for Lake Red Rock, which is formed by a dam twenty miles (32 km) downstream near Pella. The highway and the railroad tracks approach the main channel on a causeway. The highway crosses the main channel at the Warren / Polk county line, on a simple girder bridge, while the adjacent railroad crosses on an over-deck truss bridge. It continues north into Polk County on another causeway for two miles (3.2 km), where it curves to the northwest towards Runnells. At the Runnells city limits, Iowa 316 ends abruptly, but the highway continues as McKinney Street.

== History ==
In 1935, Iowa 316 began as a 7-mile-long (11 km) spur route from U.S. Highway 163 (US 163) south to Runnells. In 1937, US 163 became Iowa Highway 163. It was extended south to Iowa Highway 5 in the early 1980s, appearing on the state map by 1983. In 2003, the 7 miles (11 km) north of Runnells were turned over to Polk County. The southern portion of Iowa 316 was kept because it is an important crossing of the Des Moines River.

== Major intersections ==
County	Location	mi	km	Destinations	Notes
Warren	Richland Township	0.000	0.000	Iowa 5 – Pleasantville, Hartford	
Marion	No major junctions				
Warren	No major junctions				
Polk	Runnells	5.183	8.341	End state maintenance	Iowa 316 ends at the Runnells city limits; roadway continues as McKinney Street
1.000 mi = 1.609 km; 1.000 km = 0.621 mi
