= Des Moines Bypass =

Freeway in Iowa, United States

Des Moines Bypass
- Military Order of the Purple Heart Highway
- Des Moines Bypass highlighted in red

Route information
- Maintained by Iowa DOT
- Length: 24.649 mi (39.669 km)

Major junctions
- West end: I-35 in West Des Moines
- Iowa 28 south of Des Moines; US 69 south of Des Moines; Iowa 163 in Pleasant Hill; US 6 in Altoona
- East end: I-80 / US 65 in Altoona

Location
- Country: United States
- State: Iowa
- Counties: Polk, Warren

Highway system
- Iowa Primary Highway System; Interstate; US; State; Secondary; Scenic
← I-480	Iowa 500; Iowa 592	→ I-680

The bypass around Des Moines, Iowa, is a 25-mile-long (40 km) freeway around the south and east of the Des Moines metropolitan area. The route is made up of two state highways, Iowa Highway 5 (Iowa 5) and U.S. Highway 65 (US 65). The bypass begins in southwestern West Des Moines at Iowa 5's interchange with Interstate 35 (I-35). It heads to the east and then curves to the north near the southeastern side of Des Moines. It ends at the interchange of US 65 and I-80 in Altoona.

The bypass was planned in the 1970s and 1980s as two segments—Iowa 500, which is represented today by the US 65 segment north of the Iowa 5 interchange near Carlisle, and the much longer Iowa 592, which is represented by Iowa 5 from I-35 in West Des Moines to Iowa 92 near Pleasantville. Area leaders would like to see the road designated as an Interstate Highway, but significant obstacles have prevented that from happening. The bypass, together with Interstate 80 and 35, forms a beltway around Des Moines.

== Route description ==
The bypass begins at directional T interchange with I-35 on the southwestern side of West Des Moines. It heads east, between the Raccoon River to the north and the Polk–Warren county line to the south. The first interchange, S. 35th Street, provides access to Walnut Woods State Park, which resides on the southern bank of the Raccoon River.

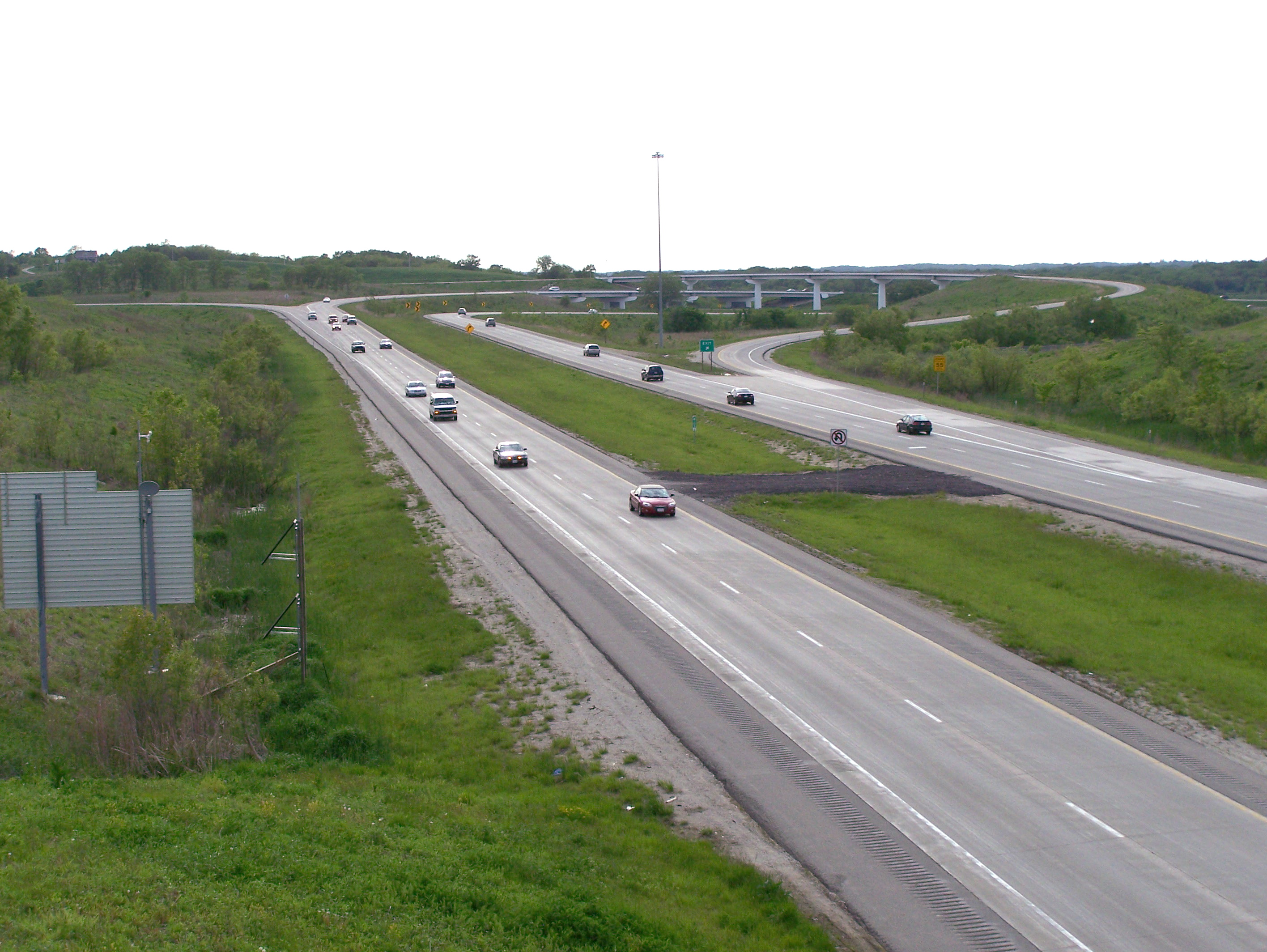
The bypass begins at this interchange with I-35.

At the Southwest Connector, which will eventually provide a connection between I-35 and downtown Des Moines, the bypass dips to the southeast. For the next two miles (3.2 km), the bypass runs within 250 and 300 yards (230 and 270 m) north of and parallel to the Polk–Warren county line until it dips into Warren County east of Norwalk. A partial cloverleaf interchange with Iowa 28 marks the halfway point of that stretch.

Through Warren County there are three interchanges, all of which connect to major north–south streets in Des Moines. County Road R57 (CR R57), which becomes Fleur Drive in Des Moines, intersects the bypass at a partial cloverleaf interchange. One mile (1.6 km) east, CR R63, which becomes SW 9th Street, connects with a diamond interchange. While this interchange is functionally a diamond, it is more accurately an incomplete partial cloverleaf. Grading of the loop entrance ramps has been completed, but they have not been paved.

Just south of the Polk–Warren county line, US 65 (US 65) and US 69 intersect the bypass at a full cloverleaf interchange. Here, US 69 is the north–south through road, while US 65 merges onto the bypass from the south and off from the north. This last interchange in Warren County is by far the busiest of the three as over 18,000 vehicles use US 65 / US 69 daily to commute between Des Moines and Indianola.

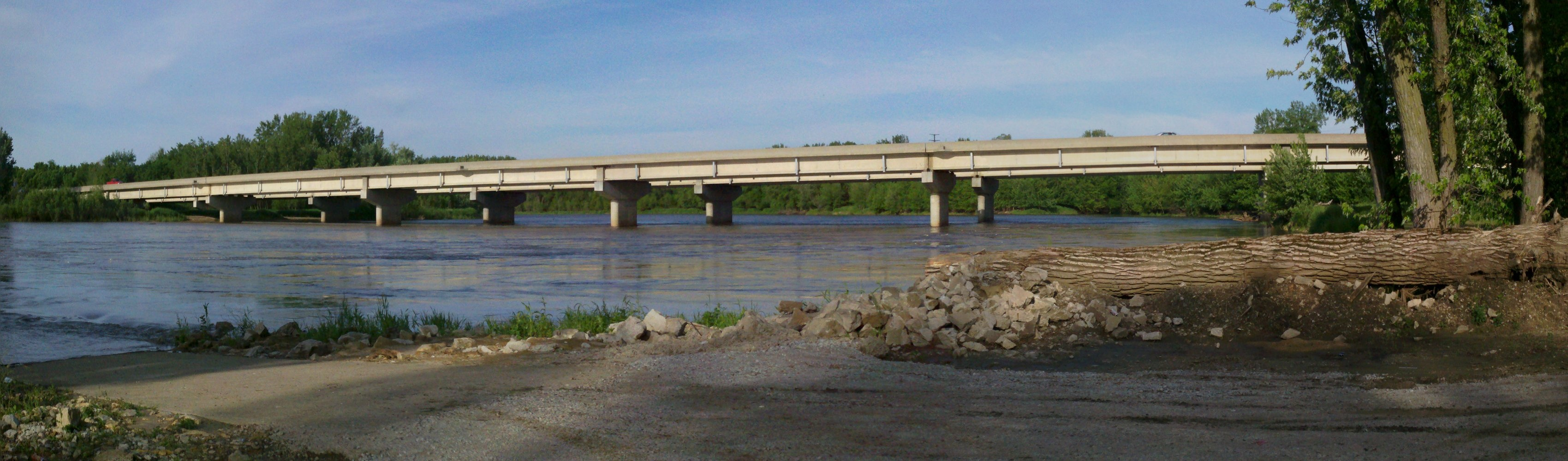
The bypass crosses the Des Moines River at Pleasant Hill

For the next two and a half miles (4.0 km), US 65 and Iowa 5 share the bypass and straddle the county line. Iowa 5 splits away at a trumpet interchange near Carlisle. The bypass takes a hard turn to the north and intersects SE 64th Avenue, which becomes Army Post Road in Des Moines.

The bypass then angles to the north-northeast to cross the Des Moines River and enter the Pleasant Hill city limits. It skirts around the eastern side of Pleasant Hill and intersects Iowa 163 at a diamond interchange. Much like the CR R63 interchange, the Iowa 163 features a loop entrance ramp that has been graded but not paved.

North of the Iowa 163 interchange, the bypass curves to the north-northwest. It skirts the western edge of Altoona, where it intersects 8th Street SW and US 6, which runs along Hubbell Avenue, at a combined interchange. 8th Street and Hubbell Avenue are in such close proximity here that a half diamond interchange was constructed for each street and the two interchanges were connected by a short access road in each direction. The bypass continues to the north-northwest for one mile (1.6 km). It ends at a trumpet interchange with I-80.

== History ==
The bypass was planned as two four-lane highways that would divert traffic around the south and east of Des Moines. Iowa 500 was planned to extend from the vicinity of Avon in southern Polk County northward through Pleasant Hill and to terminate at I-80 near Altoona. Iowa 592 was designed as a much longer highway. It would extend from I-35 near West Des Moines to Iowa 92 south of Pleasantville.

=== Iowa 500 ===
In the 1970s, the Iowa Department of Transportation (Iowa DOT) began a study on the location and environmental impact of a new highway around the east side of Des Moines. The "500 facility" (Iowa 500), as it was referred to in the study, was loosely defined as extending from the intersection of Iowa 5 and Iowa 46 near Avon to I-80 near Altoona. The study produced five alternatives; four potential routes and a plan that did not result in any new road construction and discussed the environmental impact of each. The no build option was almost immediately rejected. Since Iowa 46 passed through an industrial area on Des Moines's east side, traffic was predominantly heavy trucks. The study projected traffic to increase to a point where Iowa 46 would be functionally obsolete.

The next option was to expand existing city streets where possible. It would have started from the intersection of Iowa 5 and Iowa 46 near Avon and head north along Iowa 46. At the Des Moines River, it would curve off to the northeast to the eastern side of Pleasant Hill. It would then follow East 56th Street north Altoona, where it would curve slightly to the northwest to end at Hubbell Avenue, which carried US 65 towards Marshalltown. This route was rejected because it quickly would have become functionally obsolete as well. The "Inner Freeway West" route would start at Iowa 5 west of Avon. It would head north, roughly following Four Mile Creek to University Avenue (Iowa 163). North of University, the freeway would run to parallel East 42nd Street and end at I-80 near Berwick. This route was rejected because it would have split eastern Des Moines into two halves and would have required many homes in the area to be demolished. The "Outer Freeway" was the longest of the potential routes. It would start near the Iowa 5 / Iowa 46 intersection and head to the northeast. After crossing the Des Moines River, the freeway would curve to the east and then again to the north. The freeway would then head due north along the east side of Altoona ending at I-80 east of the First Avenue interchange.

The most viable option was called the "Inner Freeway East". The route would start around the Iowa 5 / Iowa 46 intersection and head northeast on a new freeway east of Iowa 46. The freeway would travel around the east side of Pleasant Hill and east of East 56th Street. Near Altoona, the freeway would cross over East 56th Street and head to the north-northwest. It would end at I-80 near Altoona. This route was selected because it was the optimal combination of length and pre-construction required.

=== Iowa 592 ===
At roughly the same time that the Iowa 500 study was taking place, another study was taking place to determine the location of a bypass around the south side of Des Moines. This highway, which was referred to as "State Arterial 592" (Iowa 592) for the study, was going to connect I-35 between West Des Moines and Cumming to Iowa 92 south of Pleasantville by way of the southern end of Iowa 500 near Avon. This study produced five construction options, two of which had alternate routings, and a "no-build" option.

All of the construction options largely agreed that south of the intersection with Iowa 500, Iowa 592 would be an expansion of the two-lane Iowa 5 with bypasses around most of the towns along the route.

The next option was to improve Army Post Road, which carried Iowa 5 through the south side of Des Moines. Army Post Road was an arrow-straight street from I-35 to Iowa 46, so upgrading it to four lanes would have been easy. However, it was already a four-lane street through Des Moines, so the additional traffic that would be added by the completion of Iowa 592 would have quickly rendered the street functionally obsolete.

The final option was to not build any road.

=== Recognition ===
On September 23, 1995, the bypass was designated the Military Order of the Purple Heart Highway. Signs were installed that year on the US 65 portion of the freeway. Nearly ten years later, after construction had completed, signs were installed on the Iowa 5 section of the bypass.

== Future ==
In 2012, City leaders in Des Moines and Carlisle suggested the bypass be redesignated as Interstate 335 (I-335) in order to give the entire route a less confusing name. The Iowa Department of Transportation said it would take over a year to determine if the design of the road would justify redesignating the highway. It never happened due to objections of slow moving farm equipment not having alternate route as slow vehicles aren't permitted on interstate highways. In May 2025, a proposal was revealed after years of it being shelved with potential designation of Interstate 435 (I-435). An alternate route for farm equipment must be identified as well.

== Exit list ==
County	Location	mi	km	Exit	Destinations	Notes
Polk	West Des Moines	0.000	0.000	—	I-35 – Minneapolis, Kansas City	Western end of Iowa 5 overlap
Polk	West Des Moines	1.279	2.058	102	S. 35th Street	
Polk	West Des Moines	2.731	4.395	101	Veterans Parkway	
Polk	Des Moines	4.958	7.979	99	Iowa 28 – Norwalk, Martensdale	
Warren	Des Moines	6.985	11.241	97	CR R57 (Fleur Drive) – Des Moines Int'l Airport	
Warren	Des Moines	8.153	13.121	96	CR R63 (SW 9th Street)	Last exit to be numbered according to Iowa 5's mileage.
Warren	Des Moines	11.093	17.852	70	US 65 south / US 69 – Des Moines, Indianola	Western end of US-65 overlap. From this point, exit numbers follow the mileage of US-65.
Polk	Allen Township	13.567	21.834	72	Iowa 5 south – Carlisle	Eastern end of Iowa 5 overlap
Polk	Allen Township	14.558	23.429	73	SE 64th Avenue	To Army Post Road
Polk	Pleasant Hill	17.905	28.815	77	SE Vandalia Road, Pleasant Hill Boulevard	
Polk	Pleasant Hill	20.016	32.213	79	Iowa 163 (E University Avenue) – Pleasant Hill	
Polk	Altoona	23.666	38.087	83	US 6 (Hubbell Avenue) / 8th Street – Altoona	
Polk	Altoona	24.649	39.669	84	I-80 / US 65 north – Council Bluffs, Davenport	Eastern end of US 65 overlap
1.000 mi = 1.609 km; 1.000 km = 0.621 mi: Concurrency terminus
