= Iowa Highway 5 =

State highway in Iowa, United States

Iowa Highway 5
- Iowa 5 highlighted in red

Route information
- Maintained by Iowa DOT
- Length: 103.540 mi (166.631 km)
- Existed: January 1, 1969–present

Major junctions
- South end: Route 5 near Cincinnati
- Iowa 2 at Centerville; US 34 at Albia; Iowa 92 from Knoxville to Pleasantville; Iowa 14 at Knoxville; US 65 / US 69 at Des Moines
- North end: I-35 at West Des Moines

Location
- Country: United States
- State: Iowa
- Counties: Appanoose; Monroe; Marion; Warren; Polk

Highway system
- Iowa Primary Highway System; Interstate; US; State; Secondary; Scenic
← Iowa 4	→ US 6

Iowa Highway 5 is a highway in southern Iowa. It is a north–south highway with a length of 105 miles (169 km). It is the northernmost segment of a three-state "Highway 5" also involving Missouri Route 5 and Arkansas Highway 5. Portions of the highway are freeway and expressway. It had previously been designated Iowa Highway 60. The southern terminus of Iowa Highway 5 is at the Missouri border southwest of Cincinnati. Its northern terminus is at Interstate 35 at West Des Moines.

== Route description ==
Iowa Highway 5 begins at the Missouri border southwest of Cincinnati. It passes through Cincinnati, then turns north to go through Centerville, where it intersects Iowa Highway 2. It continues north through Moravia and intersects U.S. Route 34 in Albia. Iowa 5 also intersects Iowa Highway 137 in Albia and turns northwest. It goes northwest through Lovilia and Hamilton before intersecting Iowa Highway 92 in Knoxville.

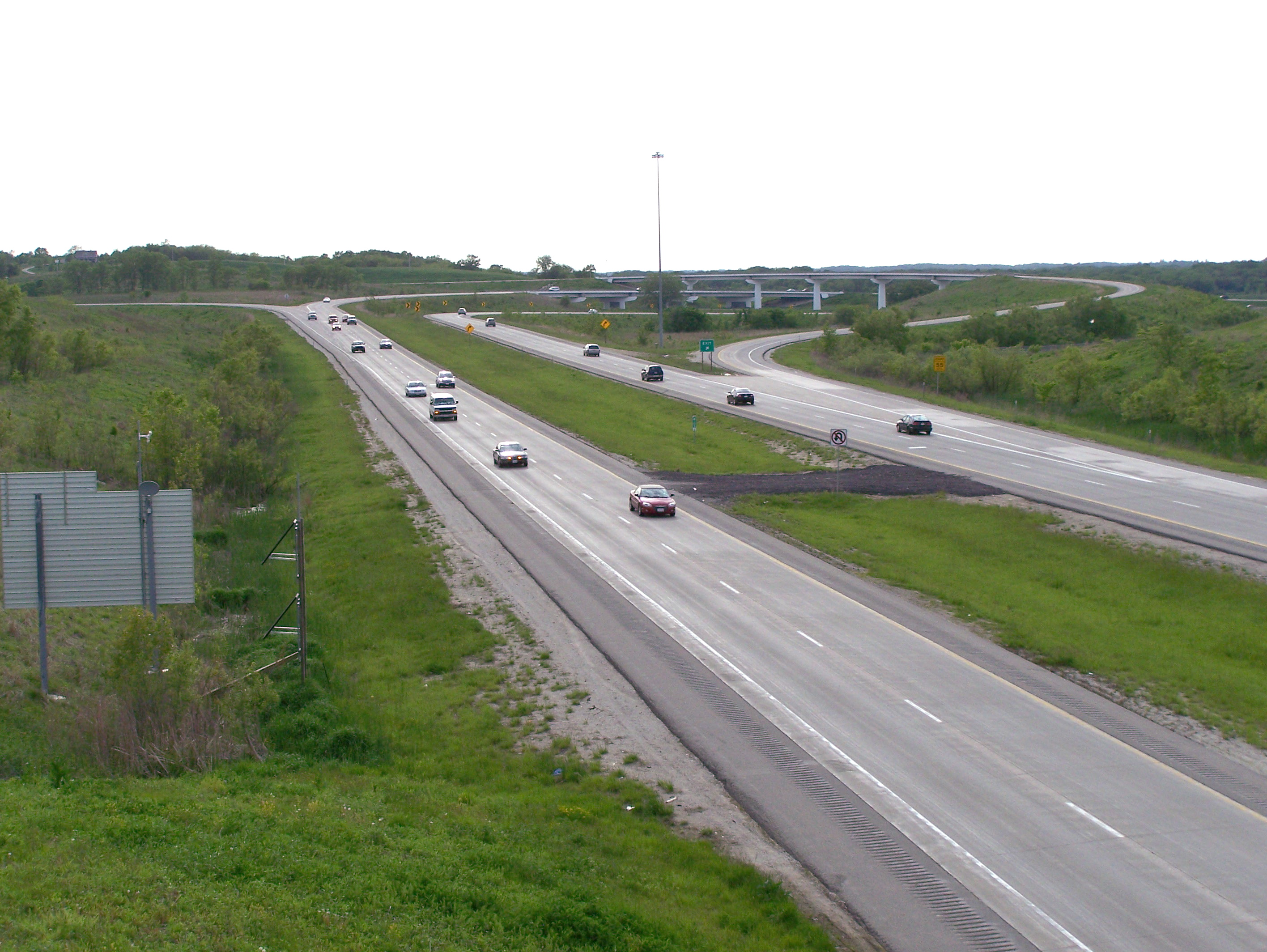
The northern end of Iowa 5 is at Interstate 35 south of West Des Moines

Iowa 5 and Iowa 92 then become a freeway bypass of Knoxville, bypassing Knoxville on its south side, intersecting Iowa Highway 14 on the bypass. After the bypass, Iowa 5 and Iowa 92 become an expressway. Iowa 5 then separates from Iowa 92 near Pleasantville. Iowa 5 then turns north, bypasses Pleasantville, and intersects Iowa Highway 316 northwest of Pleasantville. Iowa 5 continues northwest past Hartford and Carlisle, then intersects U.S. Route 65. Iowa 5 then goes west as a freeway with U.S. 65 to an interchange with U.S. Route 69, where U.S. 65 separates in Des Moines. Iowa 5 then continues west as a southeastern freeway bypass of Des Moines, intersecting Iowa Highway 28 at Norwalk and ends in West Des Moines at Interstate 35.

== History ==
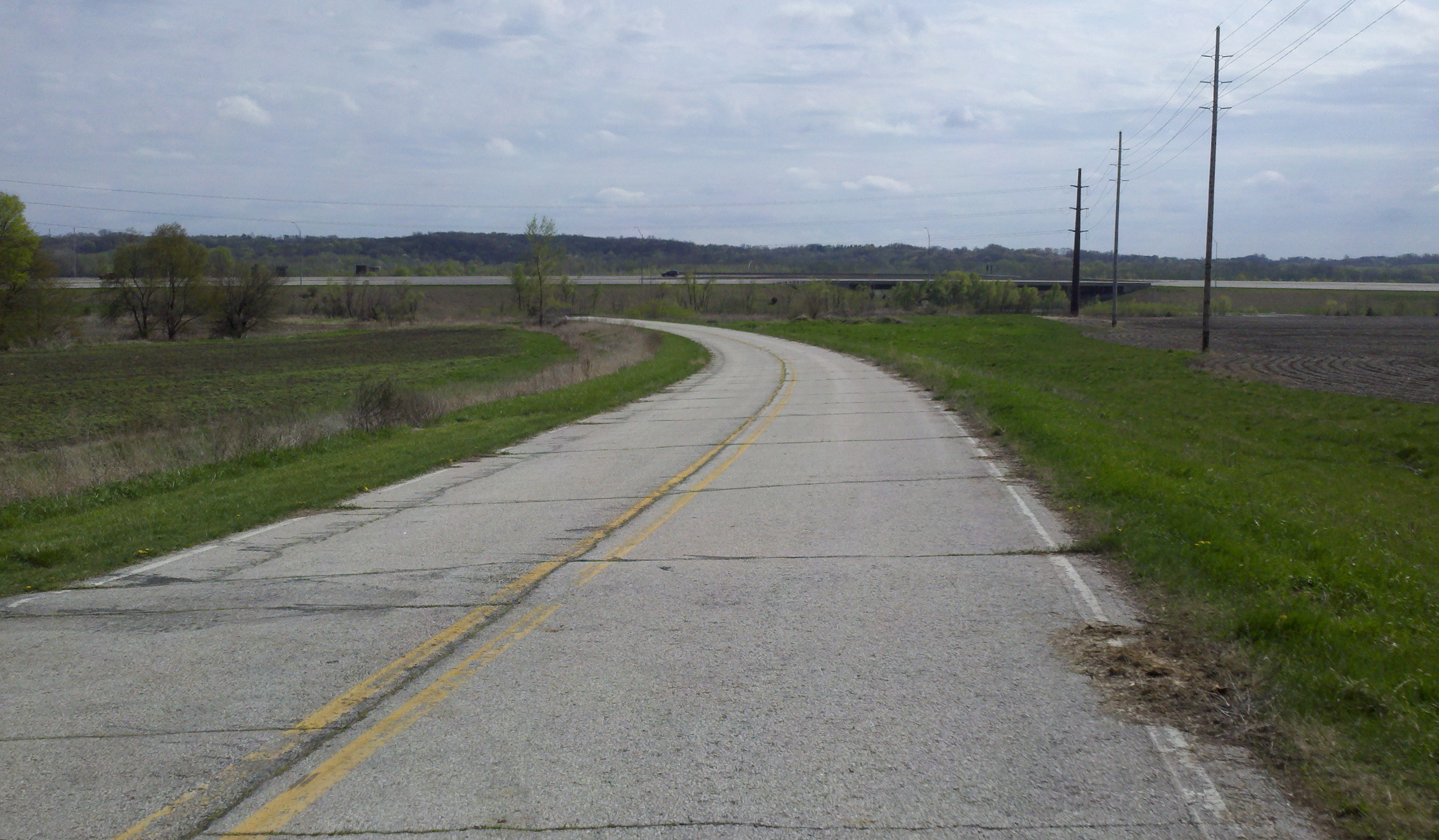
Old Iowa 5 dead ends north of the US 65 bypass

Primary Road 5 was designated in 1920 connecting Sioux City and Dubuque. In 1926, this route was truncated at Fort Dodge and at Le Mars and subsequently extended to Akron in 1929. From 1945 through 1962, when Iowa 5 was again truncated near Aurelia, Iowa 5 overlapped Iowa 3 for 60 miles (97 km). This last section of Iowa 5 is now designated Iowa Highway 7.

The current Iowa 5 was designated on January 1, 1969, along the southern portion Iowa Highway 60. It was renumbered to provide route number continuity with Missouri Route 5. In 1978, a bypass of Knoxville was opened carrying Iowa 5 and Iowa Highway 92 around the southern edge of Knoxville.

In the Des Moines area, Iowa 5 had the same route along Army Post Road from 1969 until 1997, when sections of a southern bypass, completed in 2002, were opened.

== Major intersections ==
County	Location	mi	km	Exit	Destinations	Notes
Appanoose	Franklin Township	0.000	0.000		Route 5 south – Unionville	Continuation into Missouri
Appanoose	Pleasant–Caldwell township line	8.211	13.214		CR T30 – Exline	Former Iowa 216
Appanoose	Pleasant–Caldwell township line	11.124	17.902		CR J46 – Numa	Former Iowa 277
Appanoose	Centerville	13.623	21.924		Iowa 2 – Corydon, Bloomfield	
Appanoose	Taylor Township	22.896	36.848		243rd Avenue	Former Iowa 5
Monroe	Monroe Township	30.367	48.871		645th Avenue	Former Iowa 5
Monroe	Albia	34.123	54.916		US 34 – Ottumwa, Chariton	
Monroe	Albia	34.957	56.258		Benton Avenue	Former US 34
Monroe	Albia	35.295– 35.354	56.802– 56.897		Iowa 137 north – Eddyville	
Marion	Liberty Township	51.343	82.629		CR G71 – Bussey	Former Iowa 156
Marion	Knoxville	60.162	96.821	60	Iowa 92 east / Iowa 92 Business – Oskaloosa	Southern end of Iowa 92 overlap
Marion	Knoxville	62.178	100.066	62	Iowa 14 – Knoxville, Chariton	
Marion	Knoxville	63.786– 64.183	102.654– 103.293	64	Iowa 92 Business east – Knoxville	
Marion	Pleasant Grove Township	71.176	114.547		Iowa 92 west / CR S45 south – Melcher-Dallas, Indianola	Northern end of Iowa 92 overlap; former Iowa 181
Marion	Pleasant Grove Township	71.977	115.836		Iowa 5 Business north – Pleasantville	
Marion	Pleasant Grove Township	74.718	120.247		Iowa 5 Business south – Pleasantville	
Warren	Richland Township	78.222	125.886		Iowa 316 north – Runnells	
Polk	Avon	89.874	144.638	72	US 65 north – Altoona	Southern end of US 65 overlap
Warren	Des Moines	92.455	148.792	70	US 65 south / US 69 – Des Moines, Indianola	Exit number based on US 65 mileage; signed as exits 70A (south) and 70B (north); northern end of US 65 overlap
Warren	Des Moines	95.334	153.425	96	CR R63 (SW 9th Street)	
Warren	Des Moines	96.501	155.303	97	CR R57 (Fleur Drive) – Des Moines International Airport	
Polk	Des Moines–Norwalk line	98.533	158.573	99	Iowa 28 – Norwalk, Martensdale	
Polk	West Des Moines	100.755	162.149	101	Veterans Parkway	
Polk	West Des Moines	102.211	164.493	102	SE 35th Street – Walnut Woods State Park	
Polk	West Des Moines	102.895– 103.837	165.593– 167.109	—	I-35 – Kansas City, Minneapolis	
1.000 mi = 1.609 km; 1.000 km = 0.621 mi: Concurrency terminus
