= Blossom and Frankie =

Goose couple in Iowa

- Species: Geese
- Sex: Female and male
- Nationality: United States
- Known for: Widowed animal couple
- Named after: Twin infant (Blossom); Frank Sinatra (Frankie)

Blossom and Frankie were a pair of geese at Riverside Cemetery in Marshalltown, Iowa who were brought together by the cemetery's general manager. After Blossom's partner of five years, Bud, died from an animal attack in 2022, she began behaving in a forlorn manner. Blossom was introduced to Frankie, a local goose who had also lost a partner, on Valentine's Day 2023 after the manager posted a personal advertisement for her on Facebook titled "Lonely, widowed domestic goose seeks life partner for companionship and occasional shenanigans". Frankie initially flew away from Blossom, but after a second meeting they became a couple.

== History ==
In April 2018, Blossom and Bud settled at Lake Woodmere next to Riverside Cemetery in Marshalltown, Iowa. Dorie Tammen, the general manager of the cemetery, named the pair after an epitaph on a headstone bearing the names of twin infants or premature babies who had died in 1888. Tammen found Bud dead in August 2022 after he had been attacked by another animal, possibly a coyote or fox; she buried him among plants beside the lake. While Blossom's behaviour did not change immediately after the death, in January she began to isolate herself from other birds. She often stared at her reflection in windows, mirrors, and a shiny black sample tombstone near the cemetery's office.

In Runnells, Iowa, 51 miles away, a similar event occurred. Handsome and Gretel, named after the fairy tale Hansel and Gretel due to their fondness for breadcrumbs, were adopted in spring 2020 by Deb and Randy Hoyt. Gretel disappeared in April 2022; her eggs were cracked, suggesting another animal attack. Handsome's name was changed to Frankie due to the similarity of his eyes to that of Frank Sinatra; he allegedly searched for Gretel around the farm and often followed behind the Hoyts closely for months after the attack. The Hoyts were also planning to close their farm and move out of the state.

On 10 February 2023, Tammen authored a personal advertisement on Facebook from the perspective of Blossom, which was titled, "Lonely, widowed domestic goose seeks life partner for companionship and occasional shenanigans", and read, "Come share life with me at Riverside Cemetery, where you’ll enjoy swimming in the lovely lake, good food, numerous friends, and peeking in the door of the office building." It also stated that "I'm youthful, adventurous and lively, and I’ve been told I’m beautiful." KCCI News aired the story. The Hoyts responded to the post, and the next day arranged for Frankie to meet Blossom on Valentine's Day. Tammen had received offers from other farmers but found the selling of the geese to be "unromantic", and also declined any sales as the cemetery was a nonprofit. As of 2023, Blossom was estimated to be 7 years old and Frankie was around 3.

The initial Valentine's Day meeting was unsuccessful, as Frankie flew away moments after his release, being found near the cemetery the next morning. Tammen reintroduced the two geese; Blossom spread her wings at Frankie, and they went to the lake, ate grass and interacted with other birds. Frankie learned how to swim from Blossom, and they spent their time together constantly.

The geese were featured on CBS News Sunday Morning, and updates are posted about the geese on the cemetery Facebook page. Some people wrote love poems about the geese. The story was also covered by national news such as The Washington Post.

Blossom died in a hit and run accident at Riverside Cemetery on October 27, 2025.
