= Marion County, Iowa =

County in Iowa, United States

- County
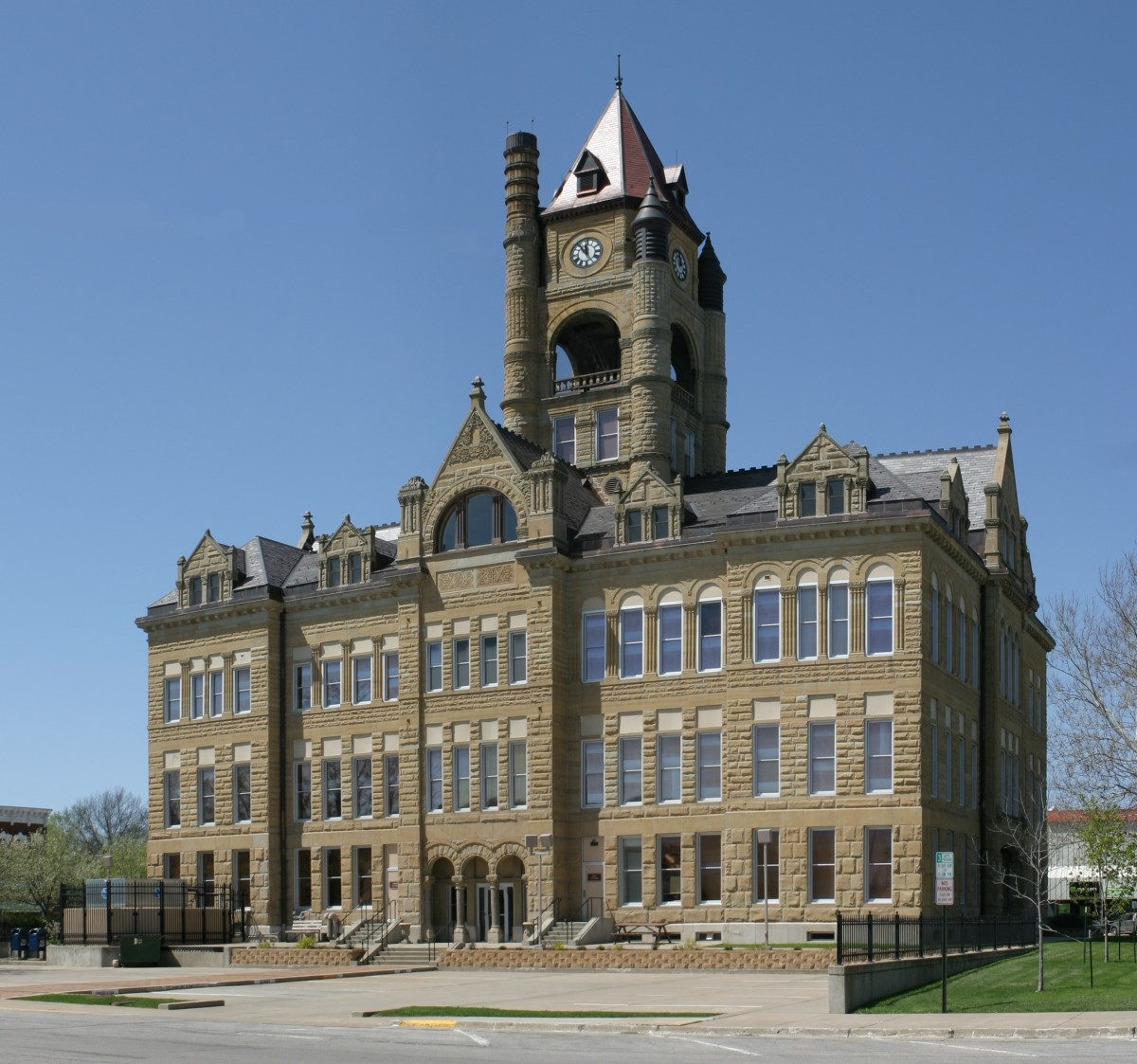
- The Marion County Courthouse in Knoxville

- Location within the U.S. state of Iowa
- Coordinates: 41°19′52″N 93°06′08″W
- Country: United States
- State: Iowa
- Founded: 1845
- Named for: Francis Marion
- Seat: Knoxville
- Largest city: Pella

Area
  - Total: 571 sq mi (1,480 km^{2})
  - Land: 555 sq mi (1,440 km^{2})
  - Water: 16 sq mi (41 km^{2}) 2.8%

Population (2020)
  - Total: 33,414
  - Estimate (2025): 34,192 ▲
  - Density: 60.2/sq mi (23.2/km^{2})
- Time zone: UTC−6 (Central)
  - Summer (DST): UTC−5 (CDT)
- Congressional district: 1st
- Website: www.marioncountyiowa.gov
- Iowa county number 63

Marion County is a county in the U.S. state of Iowa. As of the 2020 census, the population was 33,414. The county seat is Knoxville. It is named for Francis Marion, a brigadier general from South Carolina in the American Revolutionary War.

== Geography ==
According to the United States Census Bureau, the county has a total area of 571 square miles (1,480 km^{2}), of which 555 square miles (1,440 km^{2}) is land and 16 square miles (41 km^{2}) (2.8%) is water.

=== Major highways ===
- Iowa Highway 5
- Iowa Highway 14
- Iowa Highway 92
- Iowa Highway 163
- Iowa Highway 316

=== Adjacent counties ===
- Jasper County (north)
- Mahaska County (east)
- Monroe County (southeast)
- Lucas County (southwest)
- Warren County (west)

== Demographics ==
Historical population
Census	Pop.	Note	%±
1850	5,482		—
1860	16,813		206.7%
1870	24,436		45.3%
1880	25,111		2.8%
1890	23,058		−8.2%
1900	24,159		4.8%
1910	22,995		−4.8%
1920	24,957		8.5%
1930	25,727		3.1%
1940	27,019		5.0%
1950	25,930		−4.0%
1960	25,886		−0.2%
1970	26,352		1.8%
1980	29,669		12.6%
1990	30,001		1.1%
2000	32,052		6.8%
2010	33,309		3.9%
2020	33,414		0.3%
2025 (est.)	34,192	▲	2.3%
U.S. Decennial Census; 1790–1960 1900–1990; 1990–2000 2010–2020

=== 2020 census ===
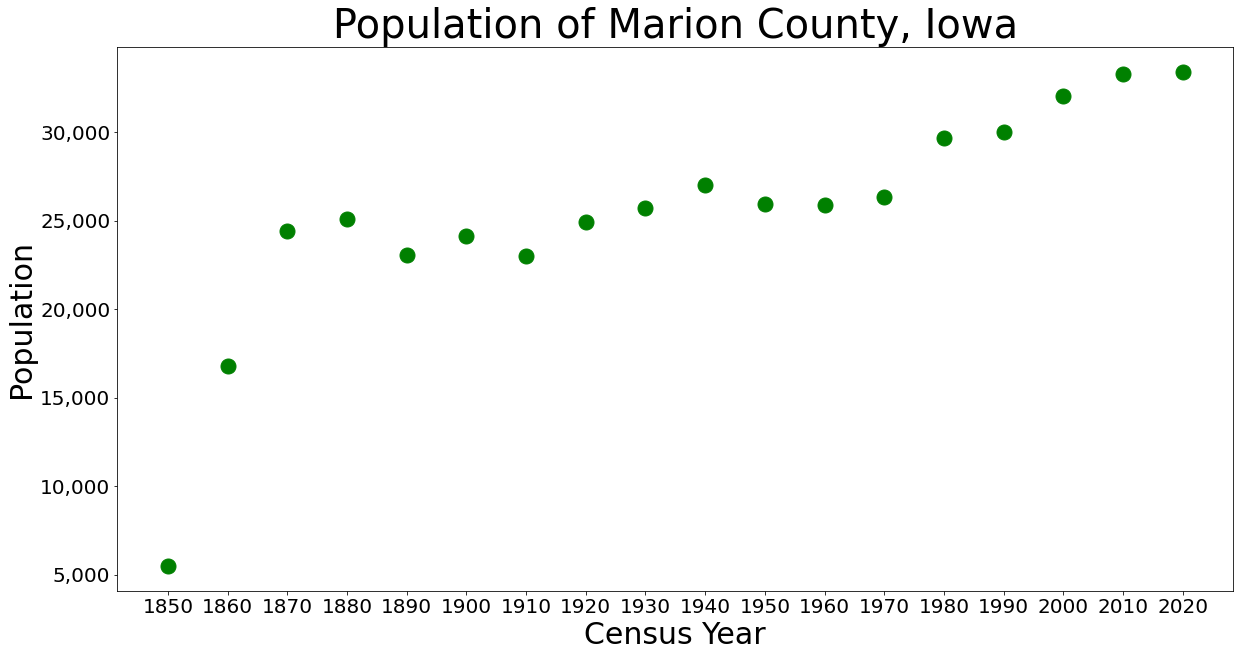
Population of Marion County from the U.S. census data

As of the 2020 census, the county had a population of 33,414 and a population density of 58.5/sq mi (22.6/km^{2}). The median age was 41.1 years; 23.3% of residents were under age 18 and 19.6% were 65 years of age or older. For every 100 females there were 98.8 males, and for every 100 females age 18 and over there were 97.2 males.

The racial makeup of the county was 93.2% White, 0.9% Black or African American, 0.2% American Indian and Alaska Native, 1.2% Asian, 0.1% Native Hawaiian and Pacific Islander, 0.6% from some other race, and 3.8% from two or more races. Hispanic or Latino residents of any race comprised 2.1% of the population.

53.0% of residents lived in urban areas, while 47.0% lived in rural areas.

There were 13,145 households in the county, of which 29.4% had children under the age of 18 living in them. Of all households, 55.6% were married-couple households, 17.0% were households with a male householder and no spouse or partner present, and 21.8% were households with a female householder and no spouse or partner present. About 27.7% of all households were made up of individuals and 12.7% had someone living alone who was 65 years of age or older.

The 2020 census counted 14,073 housing units, of which 13,145 were occupied, leaving 6.6% vacant; 74.6% of occupied housing units were owner-occupied and 25.4% were renter-occupied, with a homeowner vacancy rate of 1.4% and a rental vacancy rate of 5.4%.

=== 2010 census ===
As of the 2010 census recorded a population of 33,309 in the county, with a population density of 60.1/sq mi (23.2/km^{2}). There were 13,914 housing units, of which 12,723 were occupied.

=== 2000 census ===
As of the 2000 census, there were 32,052 people, 12,017 households, and 8,532 families residing in the county. The population density was 58 people per square mile (22 people/km^{2}). There were 12,755 housing units at an average density of 23 units per square mile (8.9 units/km^{2}). The racial makeup of the county was 97.46% White, 0.42% Black or African American, 0.19% Native American, 1.03% Asian, 0.04% Pacific Islander, 0.22% from other races, and 0.64% from two or more races. 0.80% of the population were Hispanic or Latino of any race.

There were 12,017 households, out of which 33.00% had children under the age of 18 living with them, 61.20% were married couples living together, 6.90% had a female householder with no husband present, and 29.00% were non-families. 25.60% of all households were made up of individuals, and 11.90% had someone living alone who was 65 years of age or older. The average household size was 2.50 and the average family size was 3.02.

In the county, the population was spread out, with 25.30% under the age of 18, 10.20% from 18 to 24, 26.50% from 25 to 44, 22.10% from 45 to 64, and 15.90% who were 65 years of age or older. The median age was 37 years. For every 100 females there were 98.60 males. For every 100 females age 18 and over, there were 95.80 males.

The median income for a household in the county was $42,401, and the median income for a family was $50,052. Males had a median income of $36,460 versus $25,573 for females. The per capita income for the county was $18,717. About 5.20% of families and 7.60% of the population were below the poverty line, including 8.70% of those under age 18 and 10.80% of those age 65 or over.

== Communities ==
=== Cities ===
- Bussey
- Hamilton
- Harvey
- Knoxville
- Marysville
- Melcher-Dallas
- Pella
- Pleasantville

=== Unincorporated communities ===
- Attica
- Bauer
- Cloud
- Columbia
- Flagler
- Otley
- Pershing
- Swan
- Tracy

=== Townships ===
- Clay
- Dallas
- Franklin
- Indiana
- Knoxville
- Lake Prairie
- Liberty
- Pleasant Grove
- Red Rock
- Summit
- Union
- Washington

=== Population ranking ===
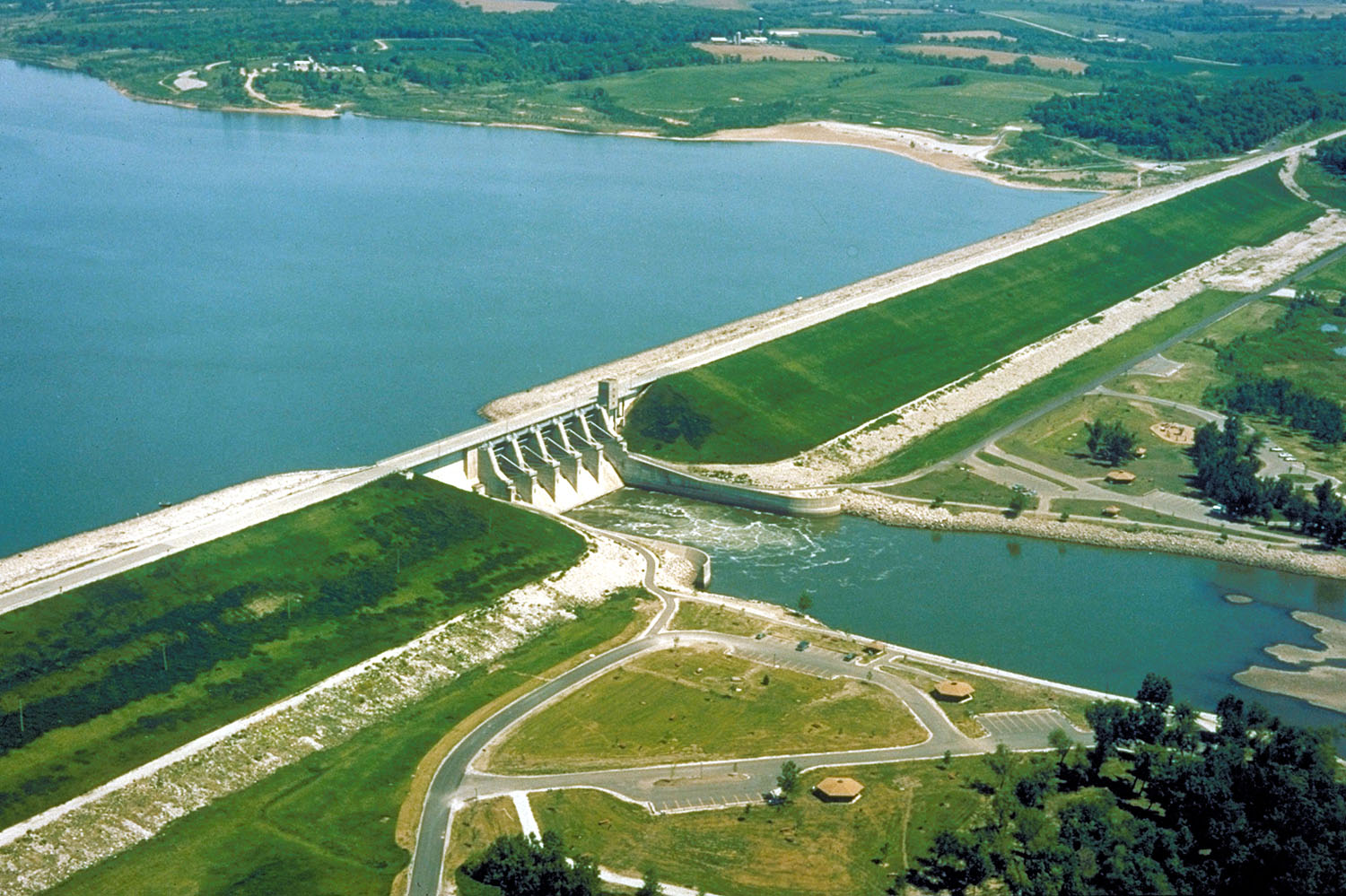
Red Rock Lake and Dam in Marion County near Pella. Elk Rock State Park is situated on both sides of the lake to the northwest. County road T15 crosses over the dam.

The population ranking of the following table is based on the 2020 census of Marion County.

† county seat

Rank	City/town/etc.	Municipal type	Population (2020 Census)	Population (2024 Estimate)
1	Pella	City	10,464	10,889
2	† Knoxville	City	7,595	7,707
3	Pleasantville	City	1,676	1,692
4	Melcher-Dallas	City	1,195	1,193
5	Bussey	City	387	395
6	Harvey	City	236	230
7	Hamilton	City	119	111
8	Swan	City	76	78
9	Marysville	City	44	38

== Gallery ==
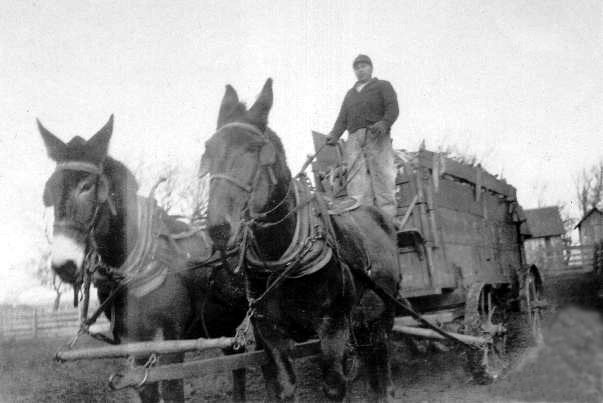
Marion County farmer with mule-drawn wagon, about 1926

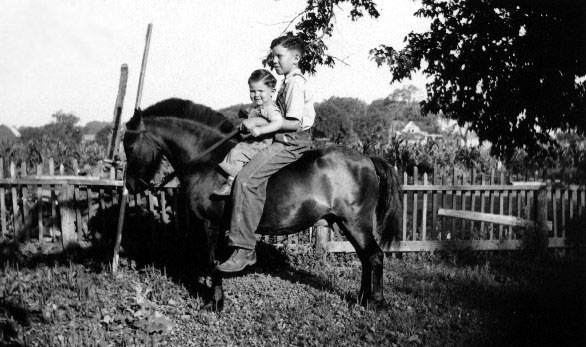
Two Iowa farm boys riding a pony, around 1937

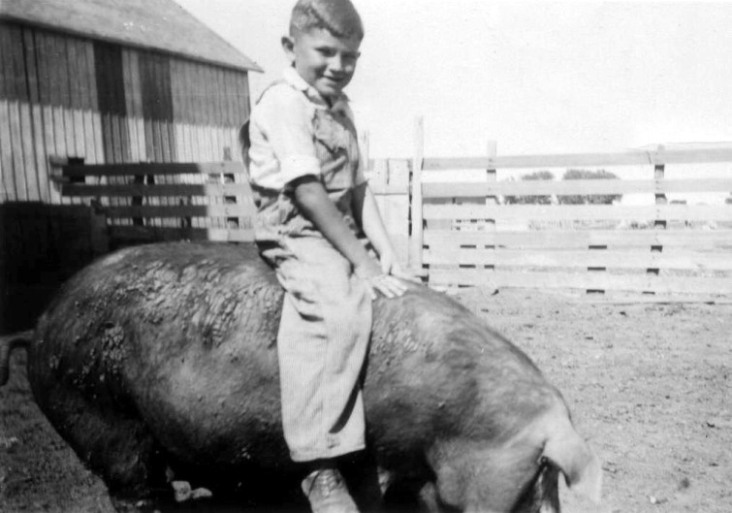
Iowa farm boy riding hog, about 1941

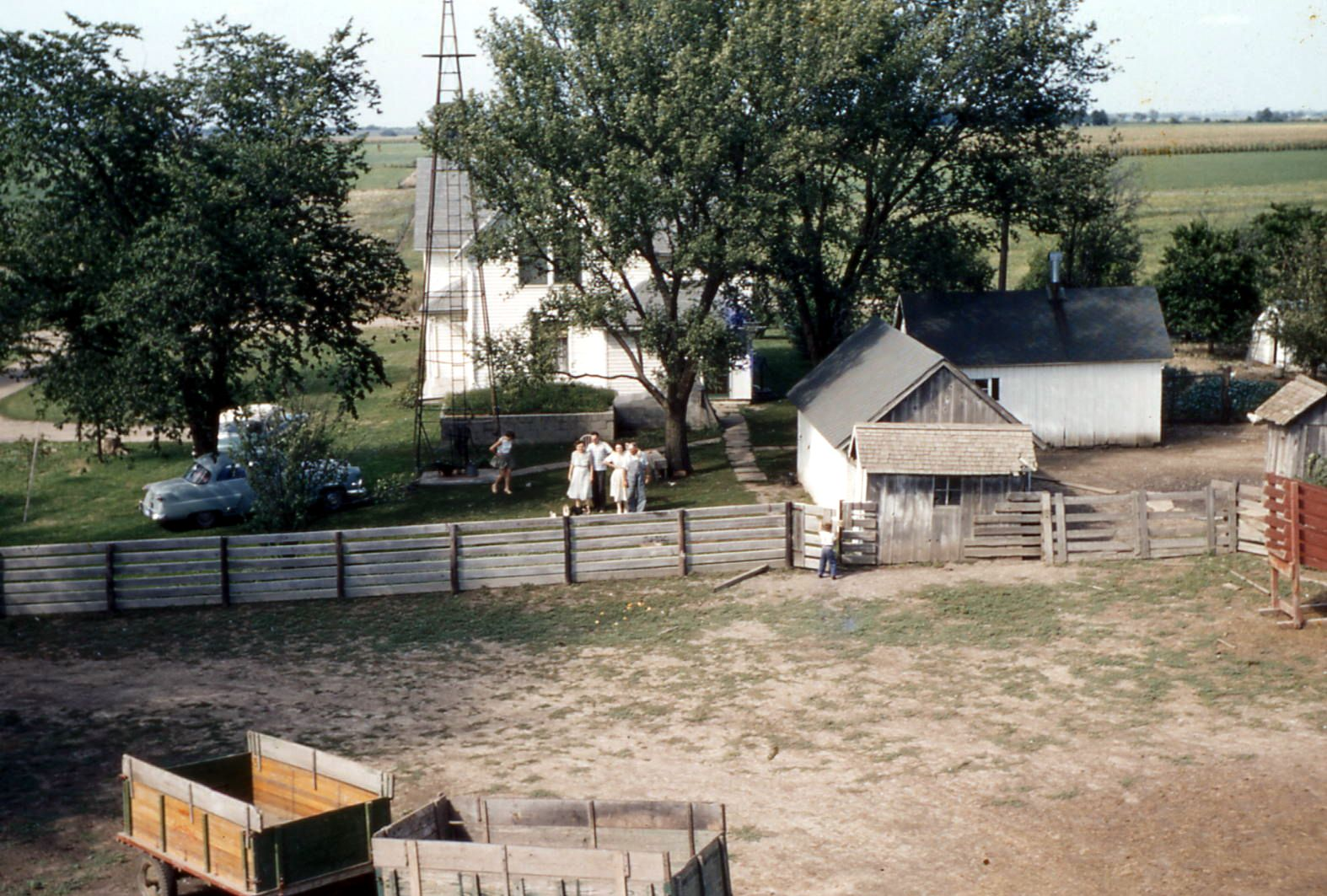
Farm house and barn yard near Pleasantville, 1957

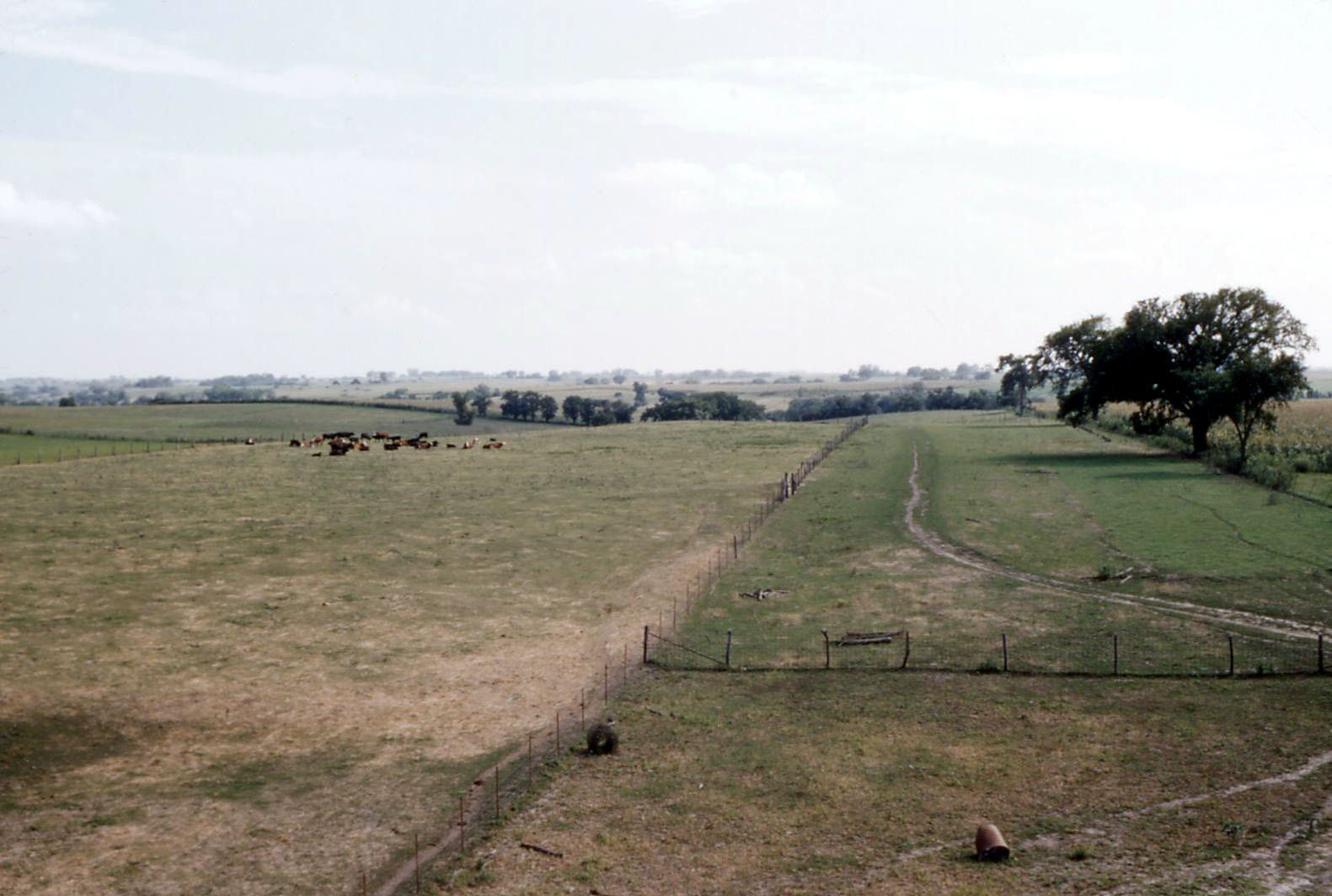
Cows in farm pasture, 1957

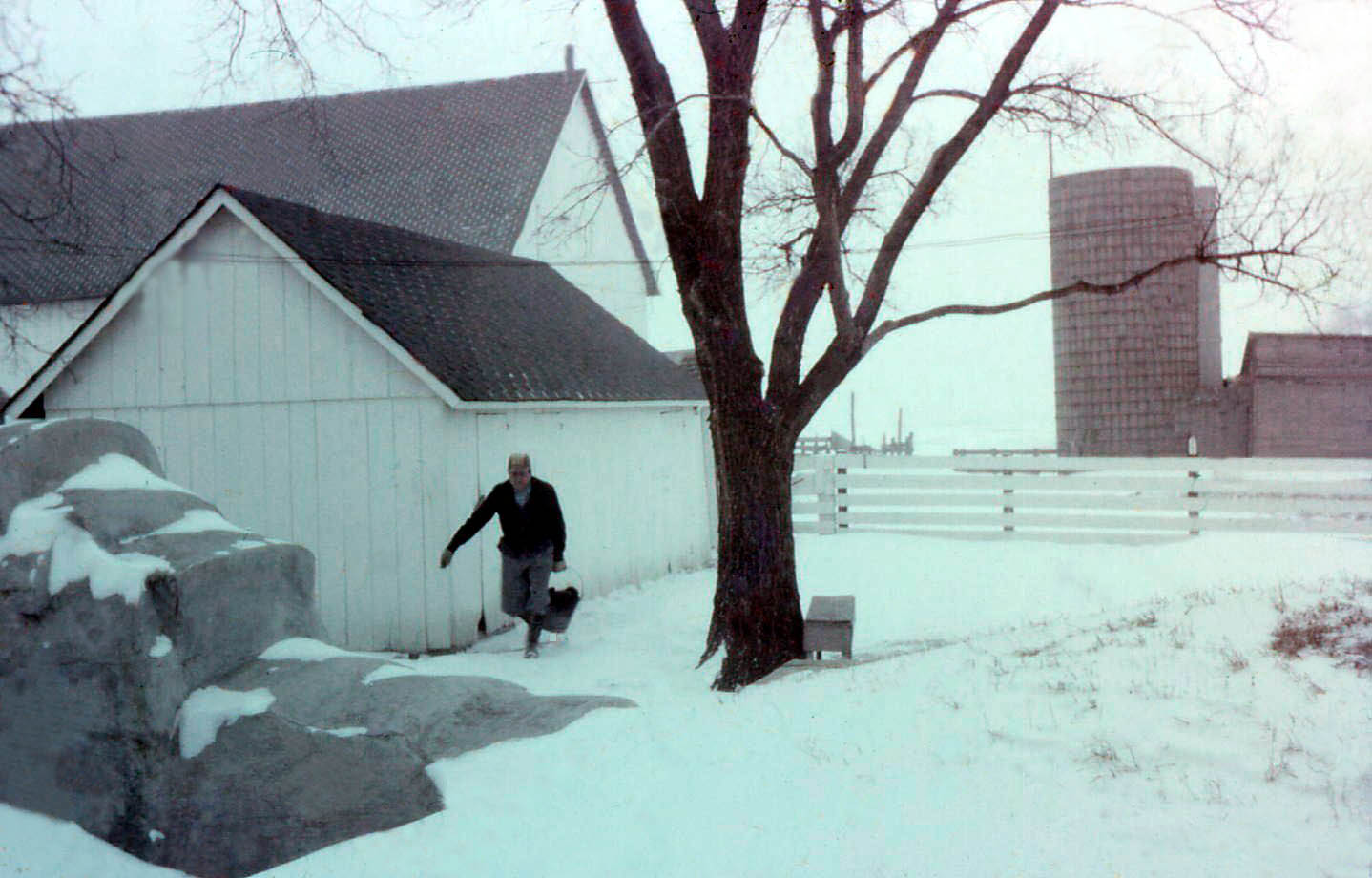
Farmer getting coal, December 1957

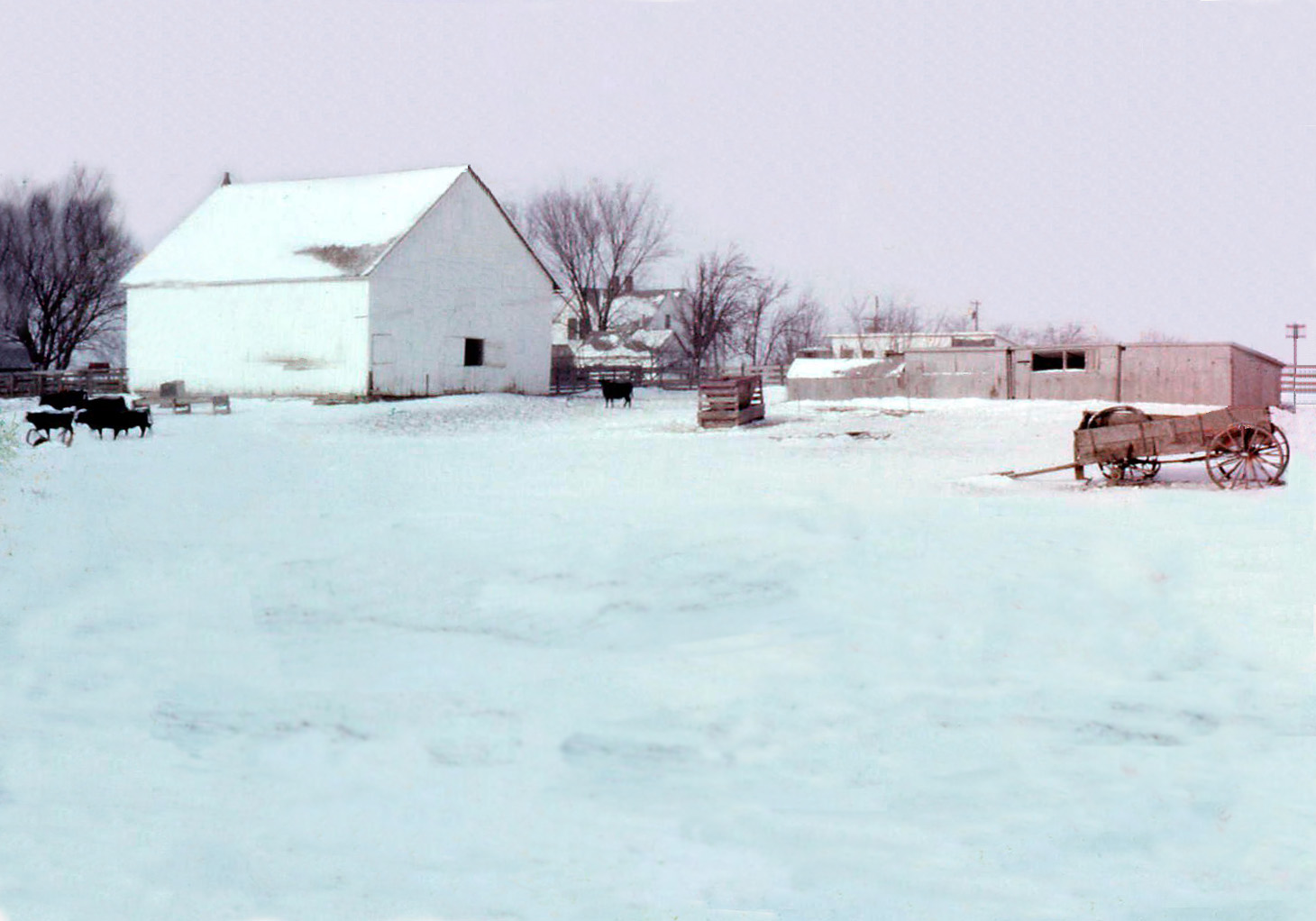
Farm barnyard

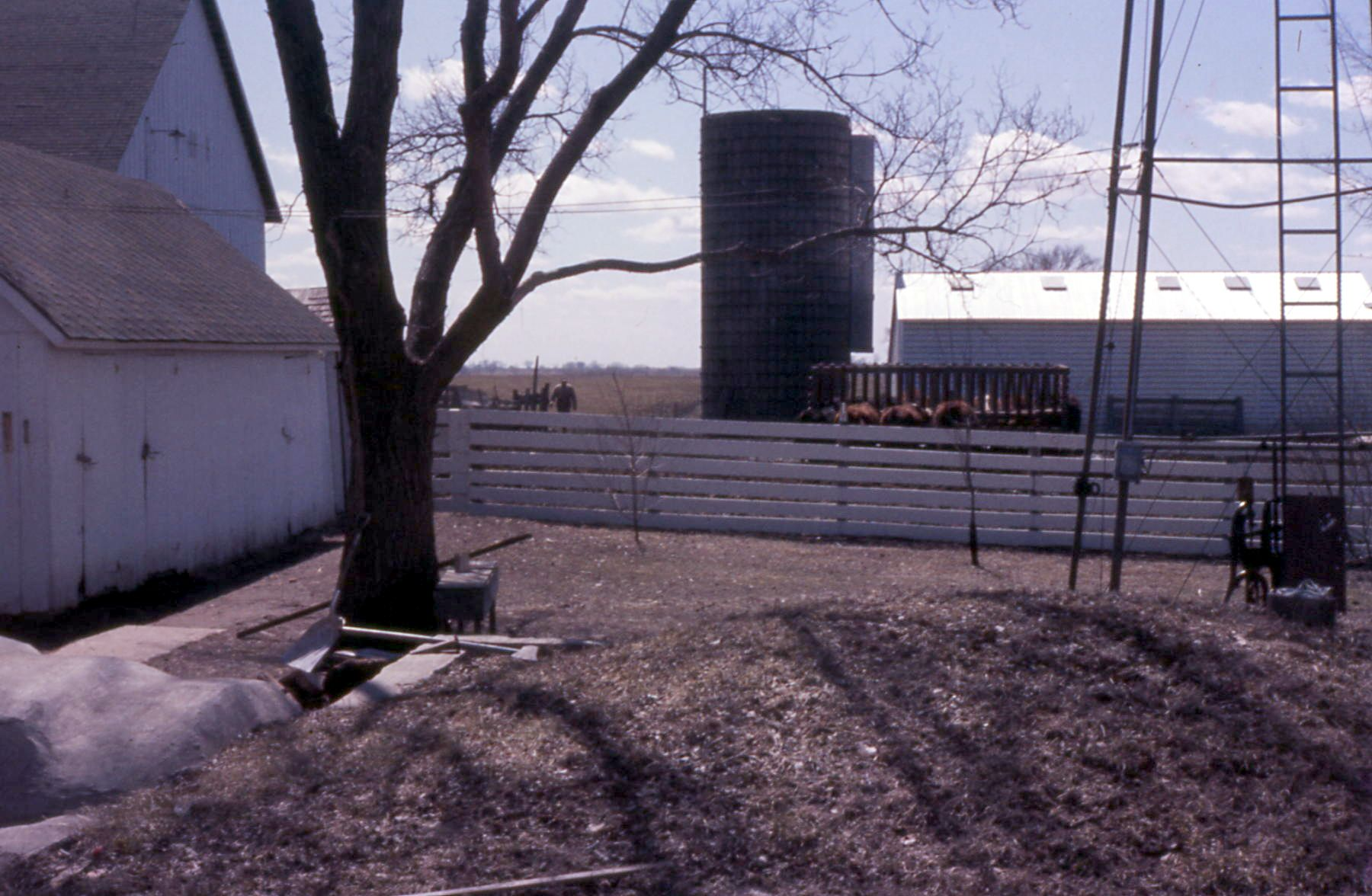
Farm barnyard and silo, 1960

== Politics ==
United States presidential election results for Marion County, Iowa
Year	Republican		Democratic		Third party(ies)	
Year	No.	%	No.	%	No.	%
1880	2,452	47.46%	1,520	29.42%	1,194	23.11%
1884	2,356	47.27%	2,593	52.03%	35	0.70%
1888	2,374	47.30%	2,322	46.26%	323	6.44%
1892	2,319	43.70%	2,540	47.86%	448	8.44%
1896	2,741	46.05%	3,119	52.40%	92	1.55%
1900	2,950	48.53%	2,950	48.53%	179	2.94%
1904	2,988	53.05%	2,202	39.10%	442	7.85%
1908	2,625	46.12%	2,739	48.12%	328	5.76%
1912	1,191	22.66%	2,276	43.31%	1,788	34.02%
1916	2,459	42.90%	3,094	53.98%	179	3.12%
1920	5,435	56.62%	3,861	40.22%	303	3.16%
1924	5,058	47.65%	2,383	22.45%	3,174	29.90%
1928	6,225	59.36%	4,113	39.22%	149	1.42%
1932	3,695	33.49%	7,067	64.05%	272	2.47%
1936	4,975	41.51%	6,745	56.27%	266	2.22%
1940	5,763	45.19%	6,915	54.22%	75	0.59%
1944	4,874	42.99%	6,365	56.14%	99	0.87%
1948	4,312	39.67%	6,300	57.96%	258	2.37%
1952	7,165	57.25%	5,196	41.51%	155	1.24%
1956	6,830	56.13%	5,316	43.69%	22	0.18%
1960	7,444	61.99%	4,547	37.87%	17	0.14%
1964	3,903	32.96%	7,911	66.80%	28	0.24%
1968	5,791	52.35%	4,618	41.75%	653	5.90%
1972	6,583	57.09%	4,643	40.27%	305	2.65%
1976	5,429	45.79%	6,226	52.51%	202	1.70%
1980	6,665	49.30%	5,490	40.61%	1,363	10.08%
1984	7,259	53.24%	6,313	46.30%	62	0.45%
1988	5,914	45.65%	6,922	53.44%	118	0.91%
1992	6,062	44.79%	5,531	40.87%	1,940	14.34%
1996	6,100	46.74%	5,978	45.80%	974	7.46%
2000	8,358	58.01%	5,741	39.85%	309	2.14%
2004	9,990	59.83%	6,574	39.37%	132	0.79%
2008	9,256	54.34%	7,421	43.57%	355	2.08%
2012	9,828	55.57%	7,507	42.44%	352	1.99%
2016	10,962	61.53%	5,482	30.77%	1,372	7.70%
2020	12,663	65.84%	6,178	32.12%	391	2.03%
2024	13,289	67.92%	5,928	30.30%	349	1.78%

== See also ==
- National Register of Historic Places listings in Marion County, Iowa
