= Lyman, Iowa =

- Unincorporated community
- Location within Iowa
- Coordinates: 41°13′52″N 94°59′04″W
- Country: United States
- State: Iowa
- County: Cass
- Elevation: 1,286 ft (392 m)
- Time zone: UTC-6 (Central (CST))
  - Summer (DST): UTC-5 (CDT)
- Area code: 712
- GNIS feature ID: 458692

Lyman is an unincorporated community in Noble Township, Cass County, Iowa, United States. Lyman is located along U.S. Route 71 and Iowa Highway 92, 12 miles (19 km) south of Atlantic.

== History ==
Lyman's population was 26 in 1902, and 17 in 1925. The population was 75 in 1940.
