= Iowa Highway 92 =

Highway in Iowa

Iowa Highway 92
- Iowa 92 highlighted in red

Route information
- Maintained by Iowa DOT
- Length: 279.585 mi (449.948 km)
- Existed: February 1, 1939–present

Major junctions
- West end: US 275 / N-92 in Council Bluffs
- I-29 / US 275 in Council Bluffs; US 59 at Carson; US 71 in Lyman; US 169 at Winterset; I-35 near Martensdale; US 65 / US 69 at Indianola; Iowa 163 in Oskaloosa; US 63 in Oskaloosa; US 218 / Iowa 27 near Ainsworth; US 61 overlap between Grandview and Muscatine
- East end: IL 92 / Great River Road in Muscatine

Location
- Country: United States
- State: Iowa
- Counties: Pottawattamie; Cass; Adair; Madison; Warren; Marion; Mahaska; Keokuk; Washington; Louisa; Muscatine

Highway system
- Iowa Primary Highway System; Interstate; US; State; Secondary; Scenic
← Iowa 86	→ Iowa 93

Iowa Highway 92 (Iowa 92) is a state highway that runs from east to west across the state of Iowa. Iowa 92 is 279 miles (449 km) long and is part of a continuous 886-mile (1,426 km) four-state "Highway 92" which begins in Torrington, Wyoming, goes through Nebraska and Iowa and ends in La Moille, Illinois. It begins at the Missouri River in Council Bluffs, where it is a continuation of Nebraska Highway 92. It stretches across the state and serves to roughly demarcate the southern one-third of Iowa. It ends at the Mississippi River in Muscatine where it continues into Illinois as Illinois Route 92. Iowa 92 was designated in 1939 replacing the entirety of the original Iowa 2.

== Route description ==
Iowa 92 begins on the South Omaha Bridge above the Missouri River with U.S. Highway 275 (US 275) between Omaha, Nebraska, and Council Bluffs. It is a continuation of Nebraska Highway 92, which stretches across Nebraska and is itself a continuation of Wyoming Highway 92. Through Council Bluffs, the highways pass through the southern part of the city but just to the north of Lake Manawa. At an interchange with Interstate 29 (I-29), US 275 splits away from Iowa 92 and joins the Interstate Highway. The road continues east through Pottawattamie County and into the communities of Treynor and Carson. Just east of Carson lies a two-quadrant interchange with US 59. Thirteen miles (21 km) later, the highway crosses the East Nishnabotna River before it enters Griswold. There, it meets Iowa 48. The highway travels further east until it reaches an intersection with US 71 at Lyman. Iowa 92 turns north onto US 71 and the two highways are overlapped for two miles (3.2 km) when Iowa 92 returns to its easterly course.

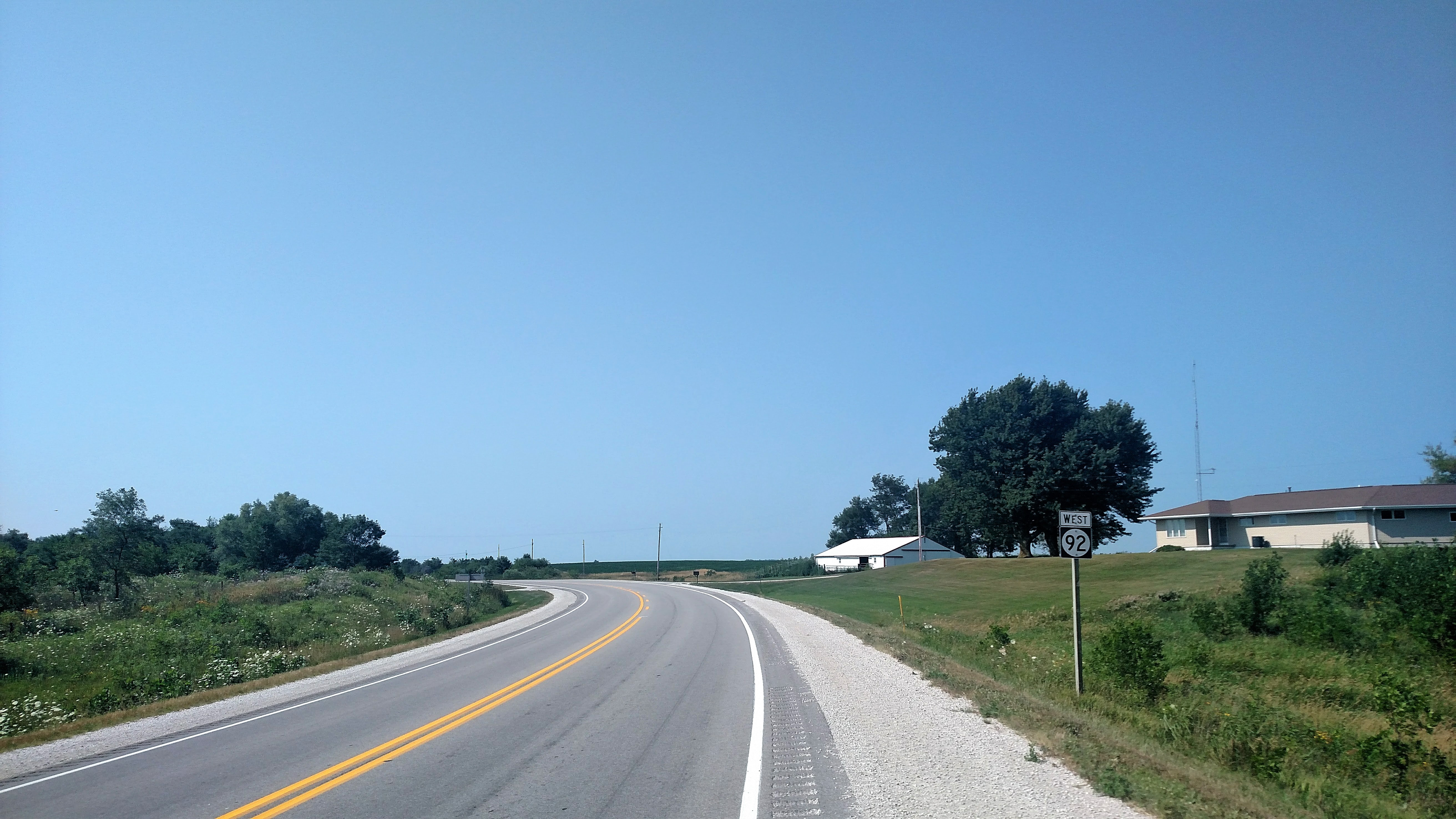
Iowa 92 east of Greenfield

The highway heads due east for eighteen miles (29 km) where it meets Iowa 148 near Massena and passes to the north of Bridgewater. After the long straightaway, the highway turns to the northeast towards Fontanelle and then curves to the east-northeast to Greenfield and an intersection with Iowa 25. East of Greenfield, the highway follows a stair-step pattern, an easterly straightaway followed by a short curve to the north and then back to the east, for nearly 20 miles (32 km) until it reaches US 169 on the western outskirts of Winterset. Iowa 92 turns north onto US 169 and the two highways form a northwestern bypass of Winterset. At John Wayne Drive, named after the actor who was born in Winterset, US 169 turns to the north toward Adel and Iowa 92 continues to the east. It passes the town of Patterson and goes through Bevington. Just east of the latter town, is an interchange with I-35. The highway travels to Martensdale, where it meets Iowa 28 and crosses the Middle River. Almost ten miles (16 km) later, the highway enters the southern part of Indianola and intersects US 65 / US 69.

Iowa 92 exits Indianola and continues east. It goes through the small towns of Ackworth and Sandyville. Near, Pleasantville, it widens to a four-lane divided highway right before it intersects Iowa 5, which joins from the north. The two highways head to the southwest toward Knoxville. On the western edge of the city, a directional interchange marks the beginning of Iowa 92's lone business route as the mainline highway curves to the south. A half-diamond interchange shortly thereafter completes the traffic movements to and from the business route. Near Knoxville Municipal Airport lies an interchange with Iowa 14 and in the southeastern part of Knoxville, Iowa 5 exits the four-lane highway. Iowa 92 Business also ends at this interchange. About one-half mile (800 m) later, the highway narrows to two lanes. For the next twenty miles (32 km), the highway does not pass through any community. It crosses the Des Moines River near the midpoint of this rural stretch. As it approaches Oskaloosa, the highway turns to the northeast and intersects Iowa 163 at a diamond interchange. Through Oskaloosa, Iowa 92 follows A Avenue, the main east–west street; it goes through the downtown area where it intersects US 63 at Market Street. East of downtown, near the neighboring community of University Park, it meets Iowa 23, which heads south to Ottumwa. Continuing east, the highway crosses the north and south branches of the Skunk River before it intersects Iowa 21 northwest of Delta.

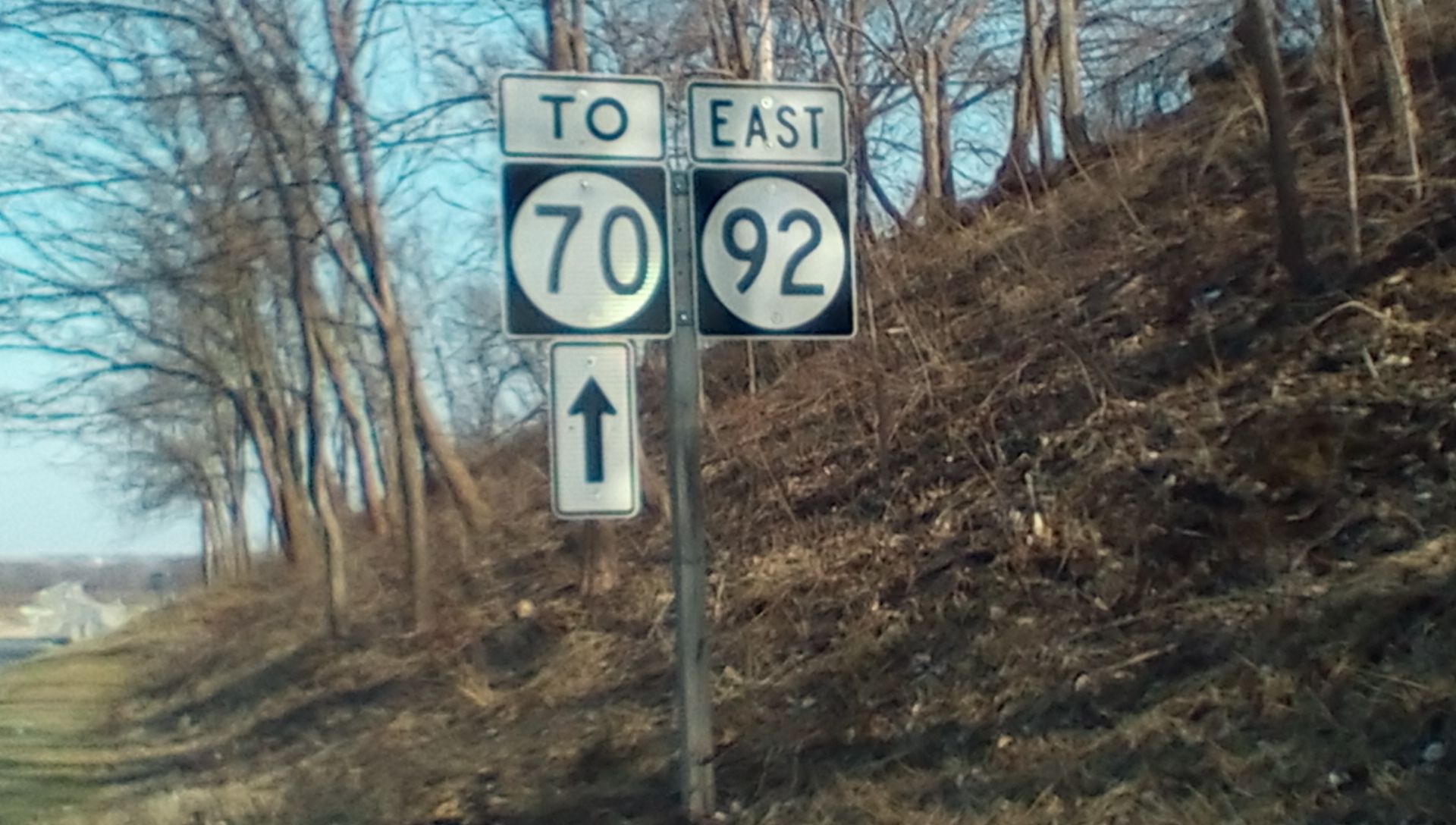
Iowa 92 eastbound in Columbus Junction, approaching an intersection with Iowa 70.

The roadway follows a straight line east through Sigourney, where it is briefly overlapped by Iowa 149, and West Chester. A few miles north of Washington, it is met by Iowa 1 from Iowa City to the north. The two highways travel south into the western side of Washington. Iowa 1 exits to the south as the highway curves to the east into the town. It skirts Washington's downtown area to the south, then to the east as it jogs north for two blocks before heading east once again. It passes through Ainsworth shortly before reaching the Avenue of the Saints highway. East of the Avenue of the Saints, the path of Iowa 92 is shaped by the adjacent railroad tracks owned by Canadian Pacific. At Columbus Junction, the highway takes an overpass above the downtown area and descends into the Iowa River valley. Less than a mile north of the highway is the confluence of the Iowa and Cedar rivers. It then passes just to the south of Fredonia and continues east to an interchange with US 61 at Grandview.

Iowa 92 turns north to follow US 61 for most of its remaining journey in Iowa. The highways turn to the northeast to descend onto Muscatine Island, a sandy plain known for growing conditions ideal for melons, particularly muskmelons. On the southwestern edge of Muscatine, US 61 and Iowa 92 turn off of the highway onto a bypass of city. US 61 Business continues northeasterly from the intersection. The bypass forms a near-180 degree squared arc around the city. Near the halfway mark of the road around Muscatine, the two highways are joined by Iowa 22. The highway then turns to the east, where it roughly marks the northern city limit. The bypass ends at an intersection with Iowa 38 and the other end of US 61 Business. There, both Iowa 22 splits away from US 61 with Iowa 22 to follow Iowa 38 southward to the city's riverfront. At Washington Street, Iowa 22 turns east toward Buffalo and Davenport. Iowa 92, US 61 Business, and Iowa 38 head south and then southwest for a few more blocks. At the foot of the Norbert F. Beckey Bridge, where Iowa 92 turns east towards Illinois, Iowa 38 ends and US 61 Business continues south into downtown Muscatine. Iowa 92 crosses the Mississippi River on the Beckey Bridge and continues in Illinois as Illinois Route 92.

== History ==
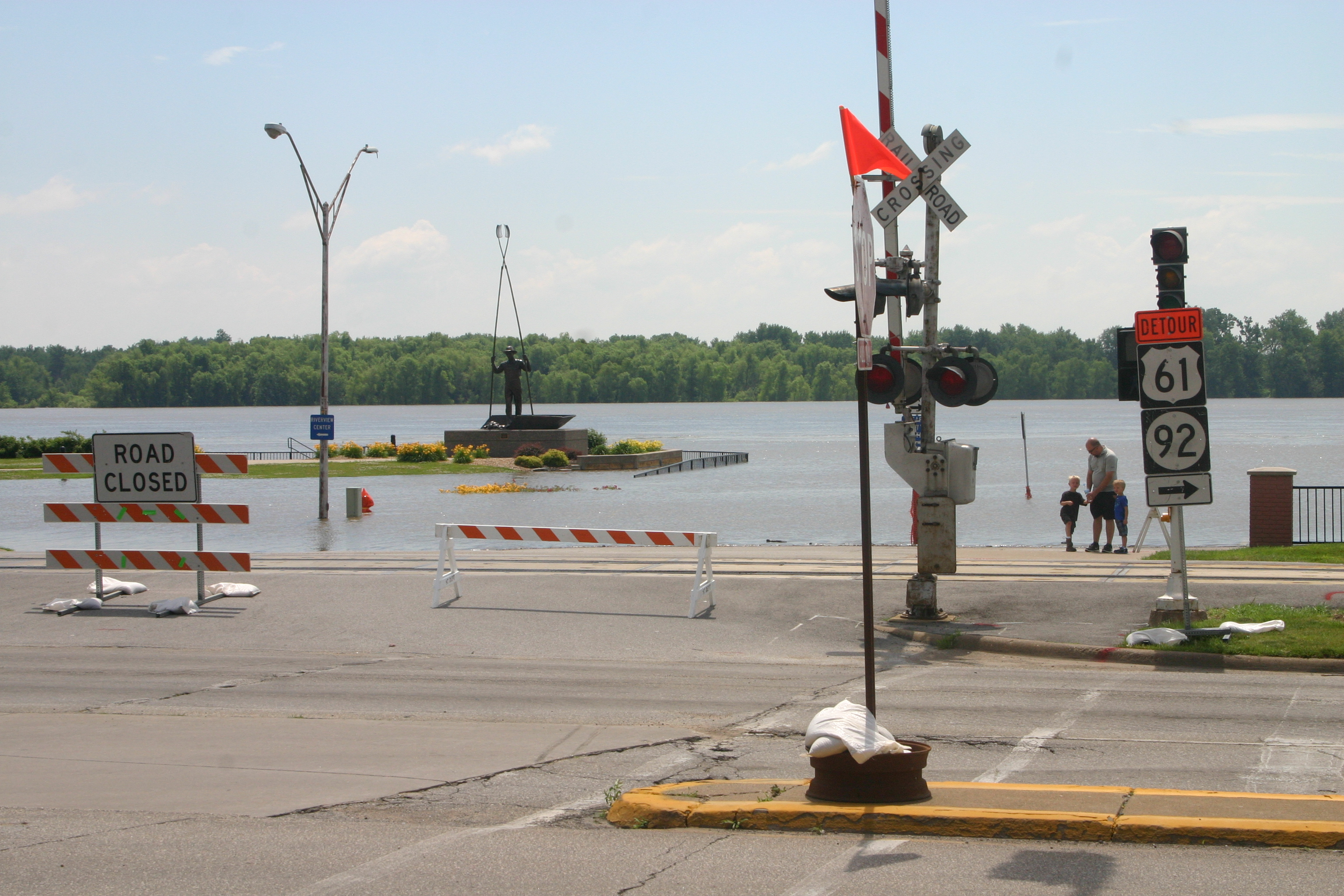
Mississippi River flooded Riverside Park in Muscatine in mid-2013.

Iowa Highway 92 was designated on February 1, 1939, replacing the former Iowa Highway 2 in its entirety. Iowa 92's designation created a continuous Highway 92 from North Platte, Nebraska to La Moille, Illinois.

== Major intersections ==
County	Location	mi	km	Exit	Destinations	Notes
Missouri River		0.000	0.000		US 275 / N-92 west (Missouri Avenue) / Mormon Pioneer National Historic Trail	Continuation into Omaha, Nebraska
Missouri River		0.000	0.000		Veterans Memorial Bridge; Iowa–Nebraska line	
Pottawattamie	Council Bluffs	5.137	8.267		I-29 / US 275 south to I-80 – Sioux City, Kansas City	Eastern end of US 275 overlap; exit 47 on I-29
Pottawattamie	Carson Township	27.750	44.659		US 59 – Oakland, Shenandoah	Two-quadrant interchange
Cass	Griswold	41.659	67.044		Iowa 48 (Adair Street) to US 6 – Elliott	
Cass	Lyman	49.546	79.737		US 71 south / CR G53 – Villisca	Western end of US 71 overlap
Cass	Lyman	51.498	82.878		US 71 north – Atlantic	Eastern end of US 71 overlap
Cass	Massena	63.322	101.907		Iowa 148 – Anita, Corning	
Adair	Greenfield	79.977	128.711		Iowa 25 (E. 6th Street) / Mormon Pioneer National Historic Trail – Orient, Guthrie Center	
Madison	Webster Township				Elmwood Avenue / Covered Bridges Scenic Byway	
Madison	Lincoln Township				CR P68 / Covered Bridges Scenic Byway – Pammel State Park	Former IA 322
Madison	Winterset	102.219	164.506		US 169 south / CR P71 / Covered Bridges Scenic Byway – Mount Ayr	Western end of US 169 overlap
Madison	Winterset				210th Street / Covered Bridges Scenic Byway	
Madison	Winterset	104.812	168.679		US 169 north – Adel	Eastern end of US 169 overlap
Madison	Crawford Township				Bevington Park Road / Covered Bridges Scenic Byway	
Madison–Warren county line	Bevington				10th Avenue / Covered Bridges Scenic Byway	
Warren	Bevington	117.606	189.269		I-35 – Des Moines, Kansas City	Exit 56 on I-35
Warren	Martensdale	129.794	208.883		Iowa 28 north – Norwalk	
Warren	Indianola	129.588	208.552		US 65 / US 69 (Jefferson Way)	
Marion	Pleasant Grove Township	145.587	234.300		Iowa 5 north – Pleasantville	Western end of Iowa 5 overlap
Marion	Knoxville	152.386	245.241	64	Iowa 92 Business east – Knoxville	Western end of freeway; exit numbers follow Iowa 5 mileage
Marion	Knoxville	154.693	248.954	62	Iowa 14 – Knoxville, Chariton	
Marion	Knoxville	156.645	252.096	60	Iowa 92 Business west (Attica Road) / Iowa 5 south – Albia, Knoxville	Eastern end of Iowa 5 overlap; eastern end of freeway
Marion	Knoxville Township				Old Highway 92 to Iowa 92 Business / CR T15 – Lake Red Rock, Pella	Interchange via connector road; former Iowa 92
Mahaska	Oskaloosa	177.960	286.399		Iowa 163 – Ottumwa, Des Moines	Exit 57 on Iowa 163
Mahaska	Oskaloosa	179.504	288.884		US 63 (Market Street)	
Mahaska	Oskaloosa	180.641	290.714		Iowa 23 south – University Park, Fremont	
Keokuk	Delta	195.210	314.160		Iowa 21 – Delta, What Cheer	
Keokuk	Sigourney	202.954	326.623		Iowa 149 south – Hedrick	Western end of Iowa 149 overlap
Keokuk	Sigourney	204.215	328.652		Iowa 149 north – Webster	Eastern end of Iowa 149 overlap
Washington	Washington	228.411	367.592		Iowa 1 north – Kalona	Western end of Iowa 1 overlap
Washington	Washington	231.452	372.486		Iowa 1 south – Brighton	Eastern end of Iowa 1 overlap
Washington	Ainsworth	240.831	387.580		US 218 / Iowa 27 – Mt. Pleasant, Iowa City	Interchange; exit 66 on US 218
Louisa	Columbus Junction	250.292	402.806		Iowa 70 north – Conesville	
Louisa	Grandview	258.534	416.070		US 61 south / CR G48 – Grandview, Burlington	West end of US 61 overlap; exit 74 on US 61; CR G48 is formerly Iowa 252 east
Louisa	Grandview Township			76	170th Street – Letts	Interchange; exit number follows US 61
Muscatine	Muscatine	270.124	434.722		US 61 Bus. north / Great River Road north	
Muscatine	Muscatine				Hershey Avenue (CR G28 west)	Two-quadrant interchange
Muscatine	Muscatine	273.248	439.750		Iowa 22 west – Nichols	Western end of Iowa 22 overlap
Muscatine	Muscatine	277.274	446.229		US 61 north / US 61 Bus. begins / Iowa 38 north – Wilton	Eastern end of US 61 overlap; western end of Iowa 38 overlap
Muscatine	Muscatine	278.542	448.270		Iowa 22 / Great River Road east (Washington Street) – Buffalo, Davenport	Eastern end of Iowa 22 overlap
Muscatine	Muscatine	279.259	449.424		US 61 Bus. south / Great River Road (2nd Street) / Iowa 38 ends	Eastern end of US 61 Business overlap
Mississippi River		279.585	449.948		Norbert F. Beckey Bridge; Iowa–Illinois line	
Mississippi River		279.585	449.948		IL 92 east (120th Avenue)	Continuation into Illinois
1.000 mi = 1.609 km; 1.000 km = 0.621 mi: Concurrency terminus

== Business route ==
Iowa Highway 92 Business
- Location: Knoxville
- Length: 4.71 mi (7.58 km)

Iowa Highway 92 Business serves Knoxville, which follows the pre-freeway alignment of Iowa 92 and Iowa 5.

Major intersections

The entire route is in Knoxville, Marion County.

mi	km	Destinations	Notes
0.00– 0.7	0.00– 1.1	Iowa 5 north / Iowa 92 west	Interchange; western terminus; exit 64 on Iowa 5
0.00– 0.7	0.00– 1.1	To Iowa 5 south / Iowa 92 east / 110th Place – Marion County Care Facility, Oskaloosa	Part of exit 64 on Iowa 5
1.85	2.98	Iowa 14 (Lincoln Street)	
4.71	7.58	Iowa 5 / Iowa 92 – Oskaloosa, Albia, Indianola	Interchange; eastern terminus; exit 60 on Iowa 92; road continues as Iowa 5 south
1.000 mi = 1.609 km; 1.000 km = 0.621 mi
