= Swan, Iowa =

- unincorporated community
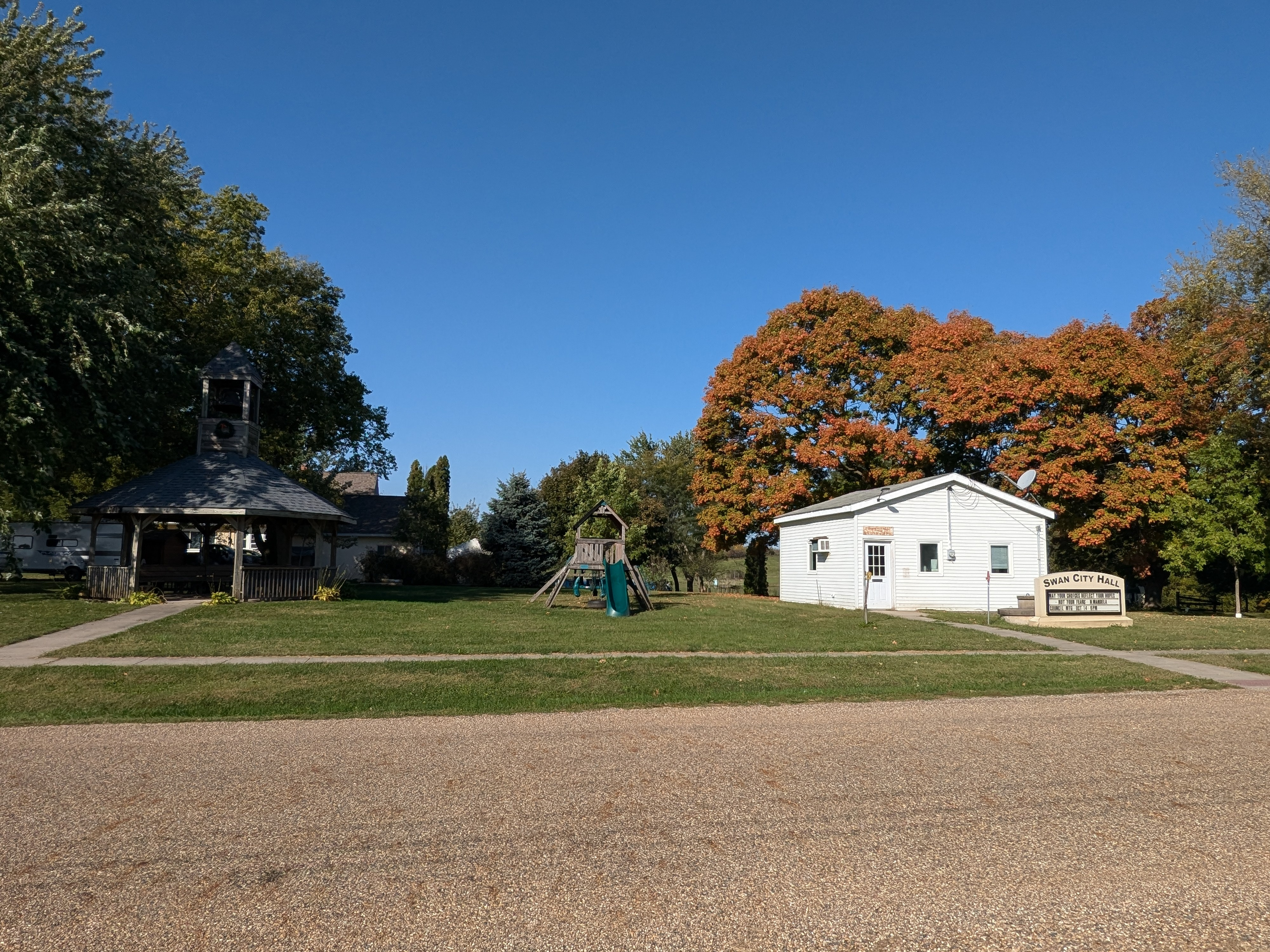
- Former city hall in Swan

- Location of Swan, Iowa
- Coordinates: 41°28′03″N 93°18′34″W
- Country: United States
- State: Iowa
- County: Marion

Area
  - Total: 0.62 sq mi (1.60 km^{2})
  - Land: 0.62 sq mi (1.60 km^{2})
  - Water: 0 sq mi (0.00 km^{2})
- Elevation: 755 ft (230 m)

Population (2020)
  - Total: 76
  - Density: 123.2/sq mi (47.56/km^{2})
- Time zone: UTC-6 (Central (CST))
  - Summer (DST): UTC-5 (CDT)
- ZIP code: 50252
- Area code: 515
- FIPS code: 19-76665
- GNIS feature ID: 2396013
- Website: https://cityofswan.org/

Swan is an unincorporated community and former city in Marion County, Iowa, United States. The population was 76 at the time of the 2020 census. On April 18, 2025 the city council of Swan voted to disincorporate the city, and in December of 2025, Swan went from being a city, to an unincorporated community.

== Geography ==
According to the United States Census Bureau, the city has a total area of 0.64 square miles (1.66 km^{2}), all of it land.

== Demographics ==
Historical populations
Year	Pop.	±%
1880	99	—
1890	419	+323.2%
1900	406	−3.1%
1910	292	−28.1%
1920	238	−18.5%
1930	220	−7.6%
1940	217	−1.4%
1950	194	−10.6%
1960	168	−13.4%
1970	56	−66.7%
1980	102	+82.1%
1990	76	−25.5%
2000	121	+59.2%
2010	72	−40.5%
2020	76	+5.6%
Source:"U.S. Census website". United States Census Bureau. and Iowa Data Center; Source: U.S. Decennial Census

=== 2020 census ===
As of the census of 2020, there were 76 people, 32 households, and 22 families residing in the city. The population density was 123.2 inhabitants per square mile (47.6/km^{2}). There were 32 housing units at an average density of 51.9 per square mile (20.0/km^{2}). The racial makeup of the city was 84.2% White, 2.6% Black or African American, 0.0% Native American, 0.0% Asian, 0.0% Pacific Islander, 0.0% from other races and 13.2% from two or more races. Hispanic or Latino Persons of any race comprised 1.3% of the population.

Of the 32 households, 37.5% of which had children under the age of 18 living with them, 40.6% were married couples living together, 9.4% were cohabitating couples, 21.9% had a female householder with no spouse or partner present and 28.1% had a male householder with no spouse or partner present. 31.2% of all households were non-families. 25.0% of all households were made up of individuals, 9.4% had someone living alone who was 65 years old or older.

The median age in the city was 39.5 years. 19.7% of the residents were under the age of 20; 7.9% were between the ages of 20 and 24; 31.6% were from 25 and 44; 30.3% were from 45 and 64; and 10.5% were 65 years of age or older. The gender makeup of the city was 53.9% male and 46.1% female.

=== 2010 census ===
As of the census of 2010, there were 72 people, 29 households, and 22 families residing in the city. The population density was 112.5 inhabitants per square mile (43.4/km^{2}). There were 31 housing units at an average density of 48.4 per square mile (18.7/km^{2}). The racial makeup of the city was 93.1% White, 4.2% African American, 1.4% from other races, and 1.4% from two or more races. Hispanic or Latino of any race were 4.2% of the population.

There were 29 households, of which 44.8% had children under the age of 18 living with them, 41.4% were married couples living together, 17.2% had a female householder with no husband present, 17.2% had a male householder with no wife present, and 24.1% were non-families. 17.2% of all households were made up of individuals, and 3.4% had someone living alone who was 65 years of age or older. The average household size was 2.48 and the average family size was 2.86.

The median age in the city was 37.5 years. 34.7% of residents were under the age of 18; 4.2% were between the ages of 18 and 24; 23.5% were from 25 to 44; 20.9% were from 45 to 64; and 16.7% were 65 years of age or older. The gender makeup of the city was 47.2% male and 52.8% female.

=== 2000 census ===
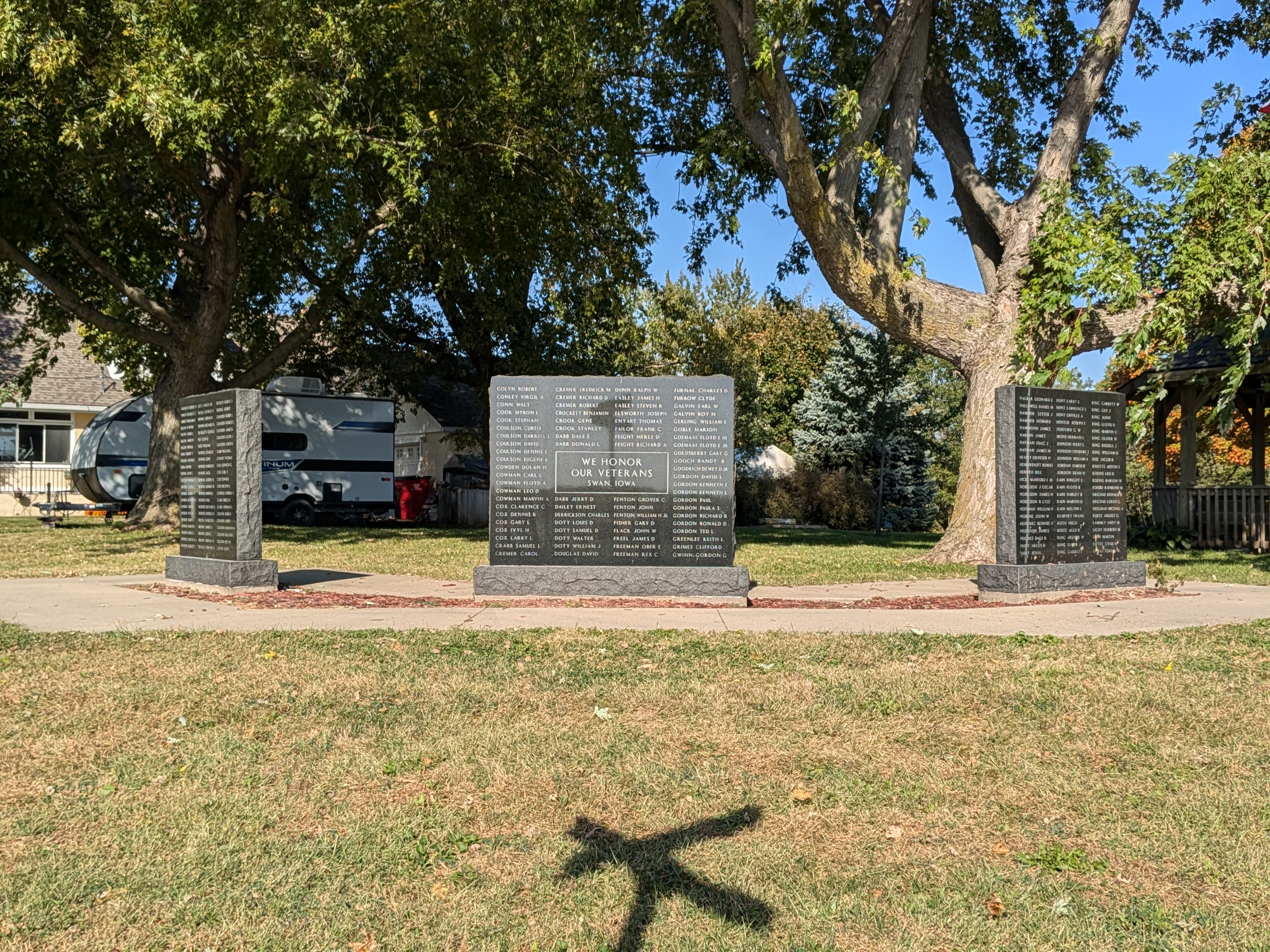
The Swan Veterans Memorial

As of the census of 2000, there were 121 people, 39 households, and 31 families residing in the city. The population density was 187.0 inhabitants per square mile (72.2/km^{2}). There were 40 housing units at an average density of 61.8 per square mile (23.9/km^{2}). The racial makeup of the city was 100.00% White.

There were 39 households, out of which 43.6% had children under the age of 18 living with them, 64.1% were married couples living together, 5.1% had a female householder with no husband present, and 20.5% were non-families. 20.5% of all households were made up of individuals, and 5.1% had someone living alone who was 65 years of age or older. The average household size was 3.10 and the average family size was 3.61.

In the city, the population was spread out, with 34.7% under the age of 18, 6.6% from 18 to 24, 28.9% from 25 to 44, 19.0% from 45 to 64, and 10.7% who were 65 years of age or older. The median age was 32 years. For every 100 females, there were 105.1 males. For every 100 females age 18 and over, there were 132.4 males.

The median income for a household in the city was $32,750, and the median income for a family was $38,125. Males had a median income of $20,833 versus $17,083 for females. The per capita income for the city was $12,936. There were 11.4% of families and 12.0% of the population living below the poverty line, including 15.4% of under eighteens and 9.5% of those over 64.

== Education ==
The Pleasantville Community School District operates local public schools.
