= Iowa Highway 28 =

Highway in Iowa

Iowa Highway 28
- Iowa 28 highlighted in red

Route information
- Maintained by Iowa DOT
- Length: 21.613 mi (34.783 km)

Major junctions
- South end: Iowa 92 in Martensdale
- Iowa 5 in Des Moines; I-235 in Des Moines; US 6 in Des Moines
- North end: I-35 / I-80 in Johnston

Location
- Country: United States
- State: Iowa
- Counties: Warren; Polk

Highway system
- Iowa Primary Highway System; Interstate; US; State; Secondary; Scenic
← Iowa 27	→ I-29

Iowa Highway 28 is a 21.73-mile-long (34.97 km) state highway located in south central Iowa. The route begins at Iowa Highway 92 at Martensdale and ends at Interstate 35 / Interstate 80 in Johnston. It is the first major north–south highway east of Interstate 35 in the Des Moines metropolitan area.

== Route description ==
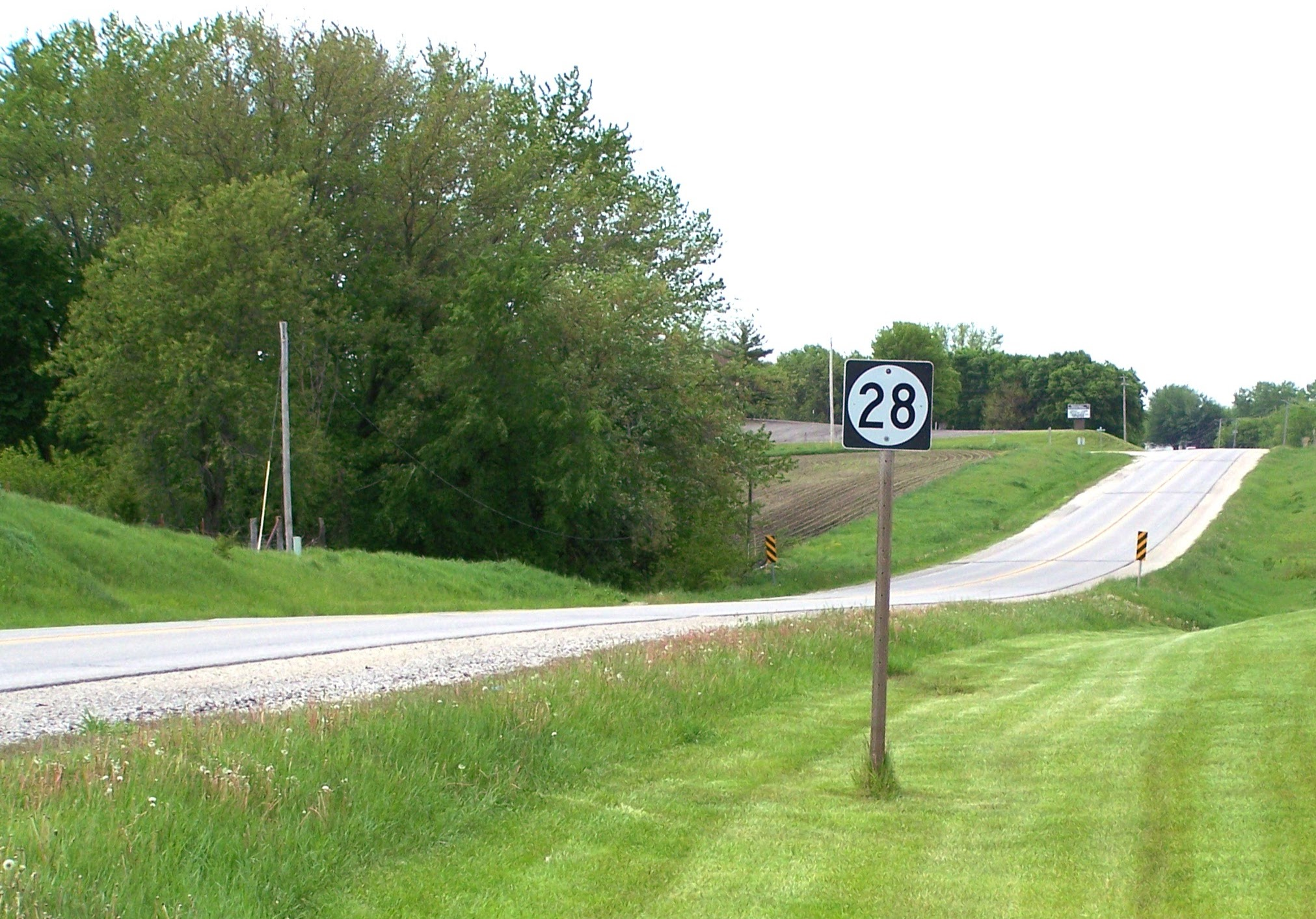
Iowa 28 one mile (1.6 km) north of Martensdale

Iowa Highway 28 begins at Iowa Highway 92 at Martensdale in Warren County. From Martensdale, it continues north through Prole and Norwalk before crossing into Polk County. Just across the county line, Iowa 28 meets Iowa Highway 5 at a partial-cloverleaf interchange. Just north of the interchange is Army Post Road, a former alignment of Iowa Highway 5. Iowa 28 crosses the Raccoon River just south of Railroad Avenue in West Des Moines. From the river to the Interstate 235 interchange, the east side of the street is 63rd Street in Des Moines, while the west side of the street is 1st Street in West Des Moines. The dual designation of street names is particularly confusing to drivers and residents alike. North of I-235, Iowa 28 continues north through Windsor Heights until reaching U.S. Highway 6 at Hickman Road in Des Moines. U.S. Route 6 and Iowa Highway 28 run together for 1.32 miles (2.12 km), first east on Hickman Road, then north on Merle Hay Road. US 6 and Iowa 28 split at Douglas Avenue near Merle Hay Mall. Iowa 28 continues north along the Urbandale / Des Moines city limit line before ending at exit 131 of Interstate 35 / Interstate 80 at the Johnston / Urbandale city limit line.

== History ==
Iowa Highway 28 was designated on 16 October 1926 from Iowa Highway 2 in Martensdale to U.S. Highway 65 in Des Moines. Iowa 28's routing changed often until 1961 when it ended at Army Post Road. In 1980, it was extended northward to Hickman Road. In 1990 it was extended northward its current northern end when Iowa Highway 401 was turned over to local jurisdictions. Iowa 401 ran from the current US 6 / Iowa 28 intersection near Merle Hay Mall to Camp Dodge in Johnston. In 1995, Iowa 28 was expanded to four lanes road between Grand Avenue and Army Post Road. When the Iowa Highway 5 freeway was built, a diagonal connector was built from the freeway to Army Post Road. Upon completion, Iowa 28 was shifted to the new diagonal road and the old segments became Iowa Highway 296, an unsigned designation. By March 2011, the final segment of Iowa 296 had been turned over to local jurisdictions.

== Major intersections ==
County	Location	mi	km	Destinations	Notes
Warren	Martensdale	0.000	0.000	Iowa 92 – Indianola, Winterset	
Warren–Polk county line	Norwalk–Des Moines line	11.317	18.213	Iowa 5 to I-35 – Knoxville	
Polk	Windsor Heights–Des Moines line	17.182	27.652	I-235 (Exit 4)	
Polk	Windsor Heights–Des Moines line	18.687	30.074	US 6 west (Hickman Road)	
Polk	Des Moines	20.000	32.187	US 6 east (Douglas Avenue)	
Polk	Urbandale–Des Moines– Johnston tripoint	21.613	34.783	I-35 / I-80 (Exit 131)	
1.000 mi = 1.609 km; 1.000 km = 0.621 mi: Concurrency terminus
