= Runnells, Iowa =

- City
- Aerial view of Runnells (2025)

- Location of Runnells, Iowa
- Coordinates: 41°30′50″N 93°21′36″W
- Country: United States
- State: Iowa
- County: Polk
- Township: Camp
- Incorporated: May 21, 1903

Government
  - Type: Mayor/Council

Area
  - Total: 0.41 sq mi (1.07 km^{2})
  - Land: 0.41 sq mi (1.07 km^{2})
  - Water: 0 sq mi (0.00 km^{2})
- Elevation: 840 ft (260 m)

Population (2020)
  - Total: 457
  - Density: 1,103.9/sq mi (426.23/km^{2})
- Time zone: UTC-6 (Central (CST))
  - Summer (DST): UTC-5 (CDT)
- ZIP code: 50237
- Area code: 515
- FIPS code: 19-69240
- GNIS feature ID: 2396447
- Website: runnellsia.com

Runnells is a city in the southeastern corner of Polk County, Iowa, United States. The population was 457 at the time of the 2020 census. It is part of the Des Moines–West Des Moines Metropolitan Statistical Area. Runnells has its own Post Office, located at 112 Brown Street.

== History ==
Runnells incorporated as a city on May 21, 1903. It was named for John S. Runnells, a former editorial writer for the Iowa State Register and private secretary for Governor Samuel Merrill.

== Geography ==
According to the United States Census Bureau, the city has a total area of 0.43 square miles (1.11 km^{2}), all land.

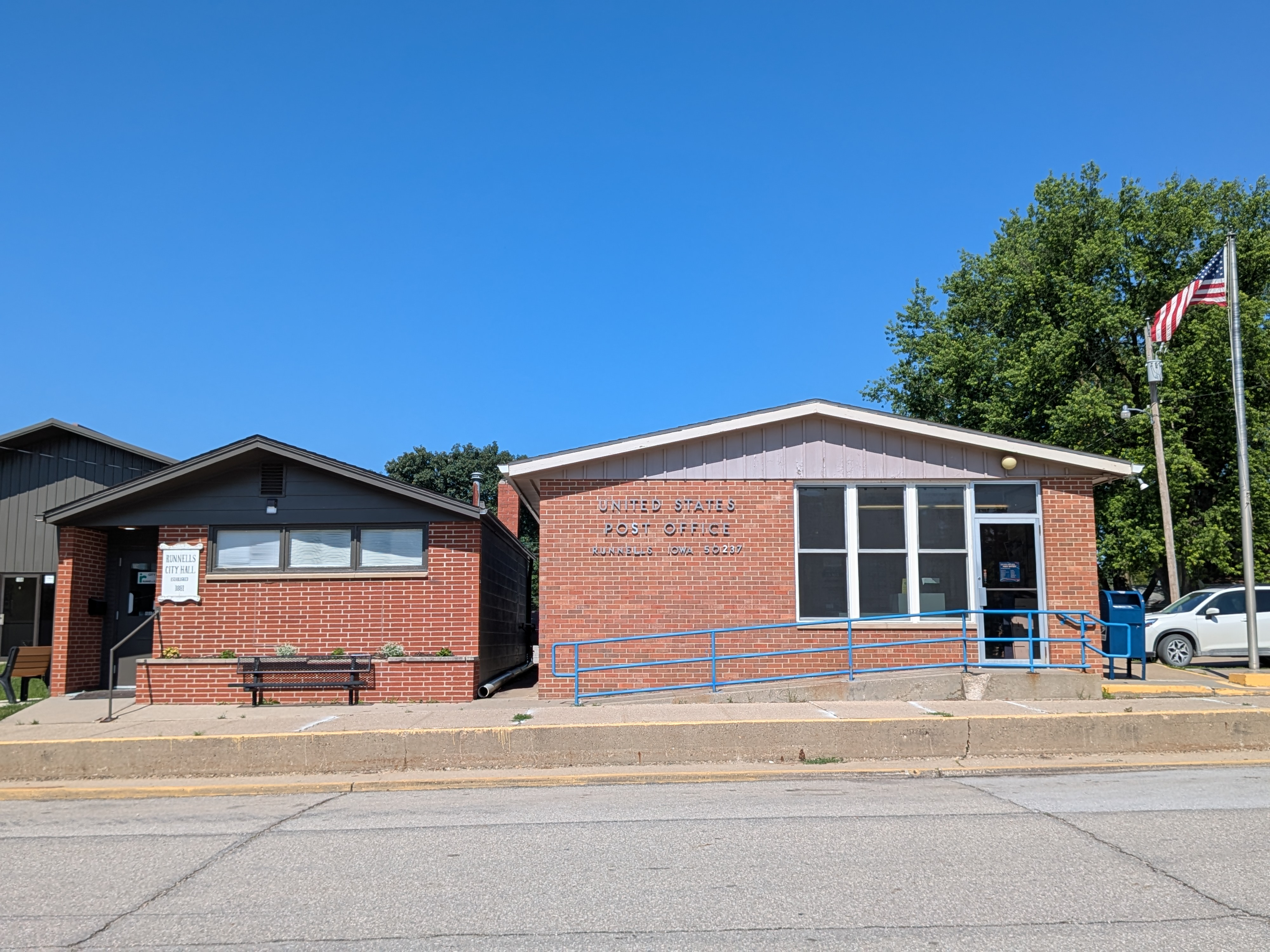
Runnels City Hall and Post Office

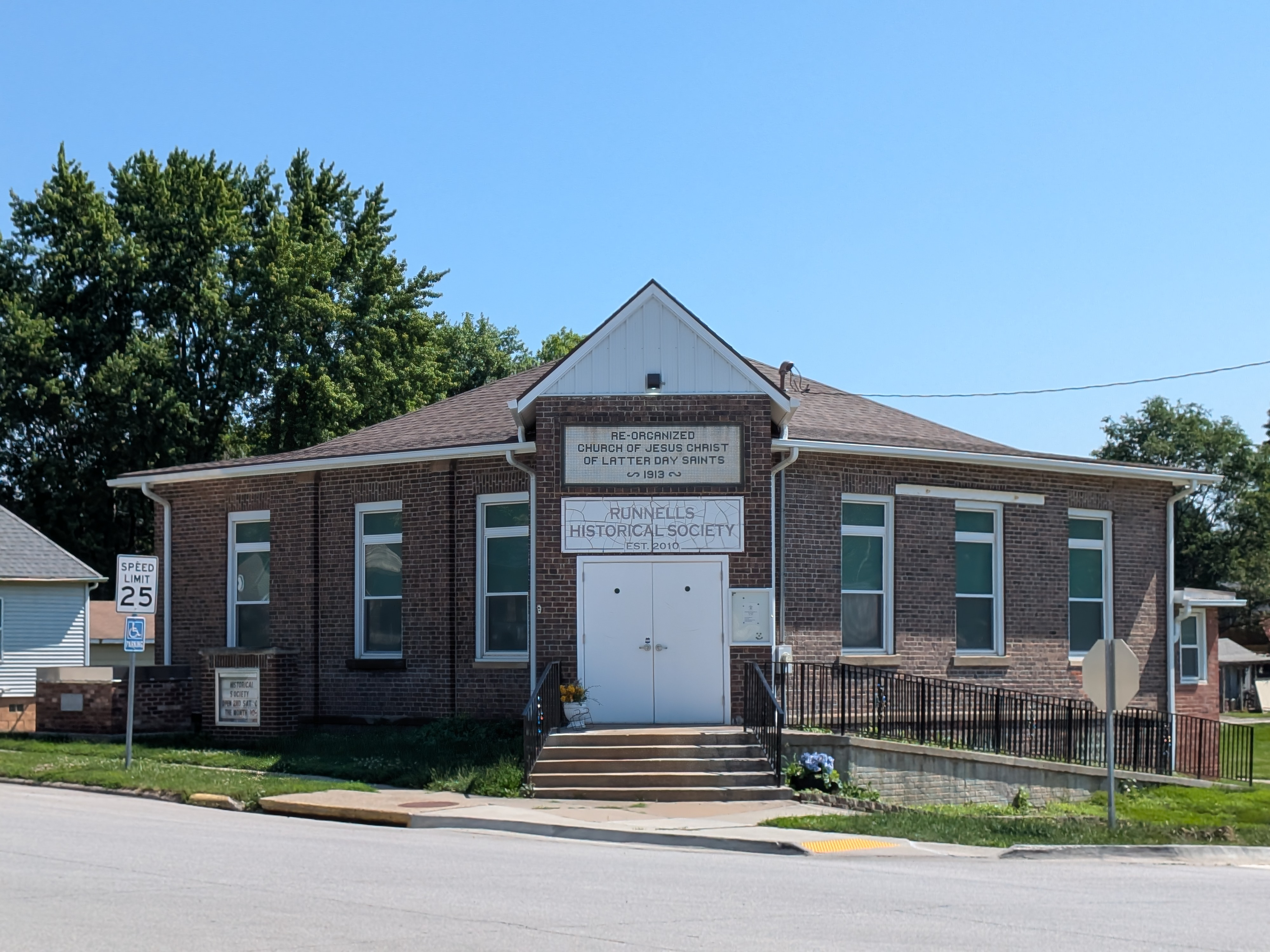
Runnells Historical Society

== Demographics ==
Historical populations
Year	Pop.	±%
1910	428	—
1920	369	−13.8%
1930	367	−0.5%
1940	388	+5.7%
1950	307	−20.9%
1960	322	+4.9%
1970	354	+9.9%
1980	377	+6.5%
1990	306	−18.8%
2000	352	+15.0%
2010	507	+44.0%
2020	457	−9.9%
Source:"U.S. Census website". United States Census Bureau. and Iowa Data Center; Source: U.S. Decennial Census

=== 2020 census ===
As of the census of 2020, there were 457 people, 185 households, and 144 families residing in the city. The population density was 1,103.9 inhabitants per square mile (426.2/km^{2}). There were 189 housing units at an average density of 456.5 per square mile (176.3/km^{2}). The racial makeup of the city was 90.4% White, 2.0% Black or African American, 1.1% Native American, 0.2% Asian, 0.2% Pacific Islander, 1.5% from other races and 4.6% from two or more races. Hispanic or Latino persons of any race comprised 2.4% of the population.

Of the 185 households, 42.2% of which had children under the age of 18 living with them, 53.0% were married couples living together, 9.2% were cohabitating couples, 18.4% had a female householder with no spouse or partner present and 19.5% had a male householder with no spouse or partner present. 22.2% of all households were non-families. 14.1% of all households were made up of individuals, 5.4% had someone living alone who was 65 years old or older.

The median age in the city was 36.8 years. 27.1% of the residents were under the age of 20; 4.4% were between the ages of 20 and 24; 31.1% were from 25 and 44; 22.8% were from 45 and 64; and 14.7% were 65 years of age or older. The gender makeup of the city was 51.9% male and 48.1% female.

=== 2010 census ===
As of the census of 2010, there were 507 people, 179 households, and 135 families living in the city. The population density was 1,179.1 inhabitants per square mile (455.3/km^{2}). There were 187 housing units at an average density of 434.9 per square mile (167.9/km^{2}). The racial makeup of the city was 97.0% White, 0.2% African American, 0.8% Native American, 0.4% Asian, 0.2% from other races, and 1.4% from two or more races. Hispanic or Latino of any race were 1.4% of the population.

There were 179 households, of which 45.8% had children under the age of 18 living with them, 61.5% were married couples living together, 10.1% had a female householder with no husband present, 3.9% had a male householder with no wife present, and 24.6% were non-families. 22.3% of all households were made up of individuals, and 8.9% had someone living alone who was 65 years of age or older. The average household size was 2.83 and the average family size was 3.34.

The median age in the city was 31.9 years. 33.1% of residents were under the age of 18; 6.3% were between the ages of 18 and 24; 31.4% were from 25 to 44; 18.7% were from 45 to 64; and 10.7% were 65 years of age or older. The gender makeup of the city was 51.3% male and 48.7% female.

=== 2000 census ===
As of the census of 2000, there were 352 people, 143 households, and 96 families living in the city. The population density was 830.9 inhabitants per square mile (320.8/km^{2}). There were 149 housing units at an average density of 351.7 per square mile (135.8/km^{2}). The racial makeup of the city was 98.58% White, 0.28% Native American, and 1.14% from two or more races.

There were 143 households, out of which 32.2% had children under the age of 18 living with them, 58.0% were married couples living together, 7.7% had a female householder with no husband present, and 32.2% were non-families. 29.4% of all households were made up of individuals, and 16.8% had someone living alone who was 65 years of age or older. The average household size was 2.46 and the average family size was 3.05.

26.1% are under the age of 18, 6.5% from 18 to 24, 27.8% from 25 to 44, 25.6% from 45 to 64, and 13.9% who were 65 years of age or older. The median age was 36 years. For every 100 females, there were 91.3 males. For every 100 females age 18 and over, there were 92.6 males.

The median income for a household in the city was $41,250, and the median income for a family was $50,000. Males had a median income of $36,458 versus $26,563 for females. The per capita income for the city was $17,643. None of the families and 2.8% of the population were living below the poverty line, including no under eighteens and 9.3% of those over 64.

== Notable person ==
- Dennis Keeney American soil scientist, grew up on the family farm near Runnells

== See also ==
- List of cities in Iowa
