= Pleasantville, Iowa =

- City
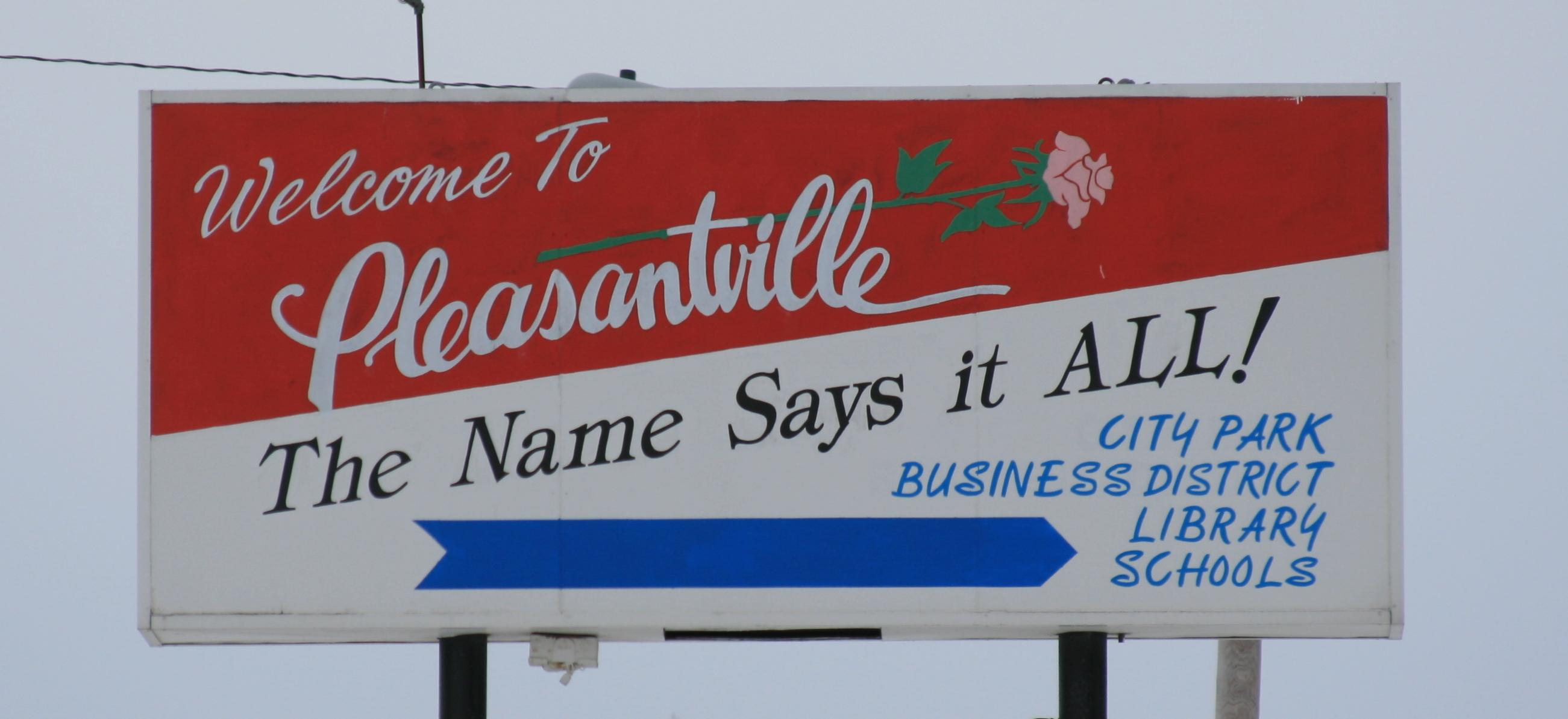
- Pleasantville welcome sign

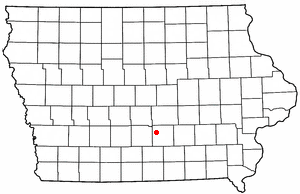
- Location of Pleasantville, Iowa
- Coordinates: 41°23′12″N 93°16′23″W
- Country: United States
- State: Iowa
- County: Marion

Area
  - Total: 2.45 sq mi (6.35 km^{2})
  - Land: 2.45 sq mi (6.34 km^{2})
  - Water: 0.0039 sq mi (0.01 km^{2})
- Elevation: 912 ft (278 m)

Population (2020)
  - Total: 1,676
  - Density: 685.0/sq mi (264.49/km^{2})
- Time zone: UTC-6 (Central (CST))
  - Summer (DST): UTC-5 (CDT)
- ZIP code: 50225
- Area code: 515
- FIPS code: 19-63750
- GNIS feature ID: 2396237
- Website: Official website

Pleasantville is a city in Marion County, Iowa, United States. The population was 1,676 at the time of the 2020 census. Pleasantville is most famous for being the corporate headquarters of Smokey Row Coffee.

== History ==
Pleasantville was surveyed and established as a town on August 1, 1849 on land then owned by William Wesley Jordan. Previous to the ownership of Mr. Jordan, the land comprising the original town plot of Pleasantville changed hands for one horse and $30.

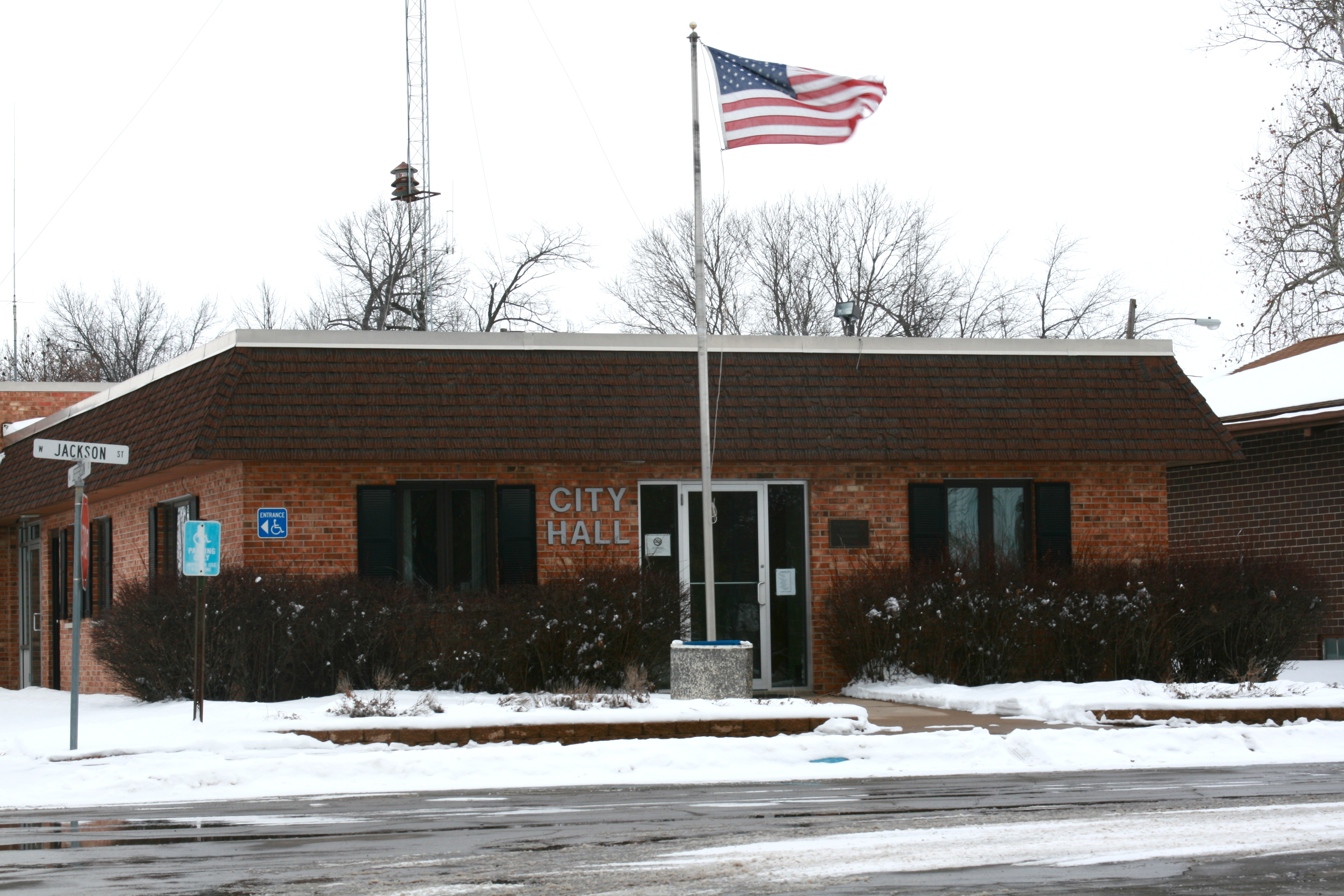
Pleasantville City Hall

A petition for incorporation was filed in District Court on June 11, 1872 with an election subsequently held in which there were 46 votes in favor and 16 votes against.

The completion of the Chicago, Burlington, and Quincy Railroad Line through Pleasantville in 1879 caused an increase in development and Pleasantville became one of the active business centers in Marion County and the principal shipping point between Knoxville and Des Moines.

The earliest population figures available begin in 1900 with 738 residents.

The first school was built in the fall of 1847, and in 1868, the school district joined with the Masonic Lodge in building a three-story brick building that remained a school facility until 1992. Today, the Pleasantville School district consists of three buildings, an elementary, a middle school, and a high school.

== Geography ==
According to the United States Census Bureau, the city has a total area of 2.54 square miles (6.58 km^{2}), of which, 2.53 square miles (6.55 km^{2}) is land and 0.01 square miles (0.03 km^{2}) is water.

== Demographics ==
Historical populations
Year	Pop.	±%
1880	449	—
1890	510	+13.6%
1900	738	+44.7%
1910	691	−6.4%
1920	859	+24.3%
1930	757	−11.9%
1940	895	+18.2%
1950	893	−0.2%
1960	1,025	+14.8%
1970	1,297	+26.5%
1980	1,531	+18.0%
1990	1,536	+0.3%
2000	1,539	+0.2%
2010	1,694	+10.1%
2020	1,676	−1.1%
Source:"U.S. Census website". United States Census Bureau. and Iowa Data Center; Source: U.S. Decennial Census

=== 2020 census ===
As of the 2020 census, Pleasantville had a population of 1,676 and 413 families residing in the city. The population density was 685.0 inhabitants per square mile (264.5/km^{2}). There were 711 housing units at an average density of 290.6 per square mile (112.2/km^{2}).

The median age was 36.7 years. 26.3% of residents were under the age of 18. By broader age groups, 29.1% of residents were under the age of 20; 5.0% were between the ages of 20 and 24; 25.0% were from 25 to 44; 23.8% were from 45 to 64; and 17.2% were 65 years of age or older. For every 100 females there were 96.0 males, and for every 100 females age 18 and over there were 92.8 males age 18 and over. The gender makeup of the city was 49.0% male and 51.0% female.

0.0% of residents lived in urban areas, while 100.0% lived in rural areas.

Of the 677 households, 34.1% had children under the age of 18 living in them. Of all households, 44.5% were married-couple households, 7.8% were cohabitating-couple households, 18.8% were households with a male householder and no spouse or partner present, and 29.0% were households with a female householder and no spouse or partner present. About 39.0% of all households were non-families, 32.8% were made up of individuals, and 13.8% had someone living alone who was 65 years of age or older.

Of all housing units, 4.8% were vacant. The homeowner vacancy rate was 1.2% and the rental vacancy rate was 4.4%.

Racial composition as of the 2020 census
Race	Number	Percent
White	1,571	93.7%
Black or African American	16	1.0%
American Indian and Alaska Native	2	0.1%
Asian	5	0.3%
Native Hawaiian and Other Pacific Islander	0	0.0%
Some other race	1	0.1%
Two or more races	81	4.8%
Hispanic or Latino (of any race)	38	2.3%

=== 2010 census ===
As of the census of 2010, there were 1,694 people, 674 households, and 426 families living in the city. The population density was 669.6 inhabitants per square mile (258.5/km^{2}). There were 719 housing units at an average density of 284.2 per square mile (109.7/km^{2}). The racial makeup of the city was 97.8% White, 0.3% African American, 0.1% Native American, 0.7% Asian, 0.4% from other races, and 0.8% from two or more races. Hispanic or Latino of any race were 1.7% of the population.

There were 674 households, of which 36.5% had children under the age of 18 living with them, 46.7% were married couples living together, 11.4% had a female householder with no husband present, 5.0% had a male householder with no wife present, and 36.8% were non-families. 31.9% of all households were made up of individuals, and 13.8% had someone living alone who was 65 years of age or older. The average household size was 2.44 and the average family size was 3.12.

The median age in the city was 36 years. 27.7% of residents were under the age of 18; 8.4% were between the ages of 18 and 24; 25.6% were from 25 to 44; 22.7% were from 45 to 64; and 15.6% were 65 years of age or older. The gender makeup of the city was 49.3% male and 50.7% female.

=== 2000 census ===
As of the census of 2000, there were 1,539 people, 615 households, and 394 families living in the city. The population density was 1,322.4 inhabitants per square mile (510.6/km^{2}). There were 662 housing units at an average density of 568.8 per square mile (219.6/km^{2}). The racial makeup of the city was 98.38% White, 0.06% African American, 0.39% Native American, 0.65% Asian, 0.06% from other races, and 0.45% from two or more races. Hispanic or Latino of any race were 1.49% of the population.

There were 615 households, out of which 34.5% had children under the age of 18 living with them, 50.9% were married couples living together, 10.2% had a female householder with no husband present, and 35.8% were non-families. 32.2% of all households were made up of individuals, and 15.8% had someone living alone who was 65 years of age or older. The average household size was 2.44 and the average family size was 3.11.

29.1% were under the age of 18, 6.0% from 18 to 24, 28.6% from 25 to 44, 20.0% from 45 to 64, and 16.3% were 65 years of age or older. The median age was 36 years. For every 100 females, there were 92.6 males. For every 100 females age 18 and over, there were 83.4 males.

The median income for a household in the city was $40,000, and the median income for a family was $48,295. Males had a median income of $35,551 versus $25,948 for females. The per capita income for the city was $18,279. About 3.8% of families and 7.1% of the population were below the poverty line, including 4.5% of those under age 18 and 20.0% of those age 65 or over.

== Education ==
The Pleasantville Community School District operates local public schools.

== See also ==
- KICL
