= Iowa Highway 330 =

State highway in Iowa, United States

Iowa Highway 330
- Iowa 330 highlighted in red

Route information
- Maintained by Iowa DOT
- Length: 47.748 mi (76.843 km)
- Existed: 1969–present

Major junctions
- West end: I-80 / US 6 / US 65 in Altoona
- US 65 / Iowa 117 near Mingo; US 30 near Marshalltown
- East end: Iowa 14 near Albion

Location
- Country: United States
- State: Iowa
- Counties: Polk; Jasper; Story; Marshall

Highway system
- Iowa Primary Highway System; Interstate; US; State; Secondary; Scenic
← Iowa 316	→ Iowa 333

Iowa Highway 330 (Iowa 330) is a 47-mile-long (76 km) state highway that travels northeasterly from Altoona past Albion, to just north of Marshalltown in Marshall County. Originally the two-lane, unpaved road was numbered Iowa 88. It became part of Iowa 64 in the 1903s and it received its current route number in 1969. Iowa 330 is mostly a four-lane, divided expressway along much of its length. In conjunction with U.S. Route 65 (US 65), Iowa 14 and US 20, Iowa 330 is commonly used as a connector between Des Moines and the Waterloo–Cedar Falls area.

== Route description ==
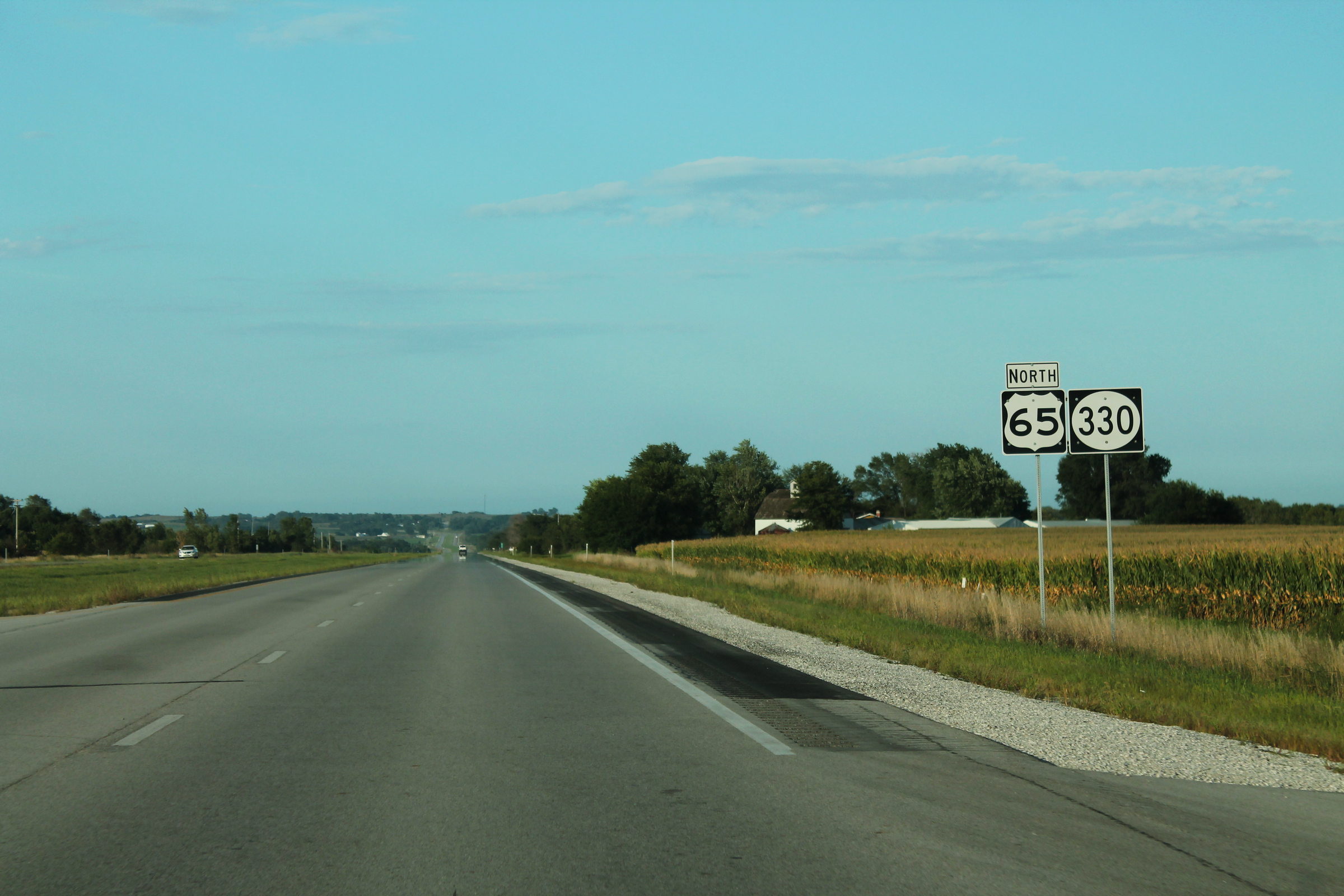
Iowa 330 and US 65 near Bondurant

Iowa 330 begins at an interchange with Interstate 80 (I-80), U.S. Route 6 (US 6), and US 65 in Altoona. The I-80 freeway travels east–west; US 6 comes up from the southwest along Hubbell Avenue and joins eastbound I-80 while US 65 exits eastbound I-80 and turns onto Hubbell heading northeast. For the first 14.5 miles (23.3 km) of its routing, Iowa 330 shares the same roadway with US 65. The two routes head northeast on a four-lane expressway through Bondurant and into rural Polk County. In the northeastern corner of Polk County, the roadway breaks from its northeastern path to curve around the Engeldinger Marsh. The highways enter Jasper County and turn back to the northeast.

US 65 leaves the Iowa 330 expressway at the interchange with Iowa 117 north of Mingo. US 65 and Iowa 117 form the northern and southern branches, respectively, of a crossroad. The expressway portion of Iowa 330 extends on for 20 miles (32 km), passing the communities of Rhodes and Melbourne. It meets US 30 at a diamond interchange just west of Marshalltown. 1 1/2 miles (2.4 km) later, now on a two-lane road, Iowa 330 turns north of Albion, bypassing Marshalltown to the west. On the way to Albion, Iowa 330 crosses the Union Pacific Railroad main line and the Iowa River. North of Albion, Iowa 330 turns east and travels 4 miles (6.4 km) before ending at Iowa 14.

== History ==
The highway was originally designated as Iowa 330 and paved in the late 1940s. In 1969 the route was extended southwestward from US 30 to its current terminus, replacing part of Iowa 64 (this section was originally Iowa 88). In 1989, it was re-routed to bypass Marshalltown, replacing Iowa 233, a spur route from Iowa 14 to Albion. In 2002, the 20 miles (32 km) between US 65 and US 30 became an expressway.

== Major intersections ==
County	Location	mi	km	Destinations	Notes
Polk	Altoona	0.000	0.000	US 6 west (Hubbell Avenue) I-80 / US 6 east / US 65 south – Des Moines, Davenport	Continuation past I-80 as US 6 westbound; western terminus; southern end of US 65 concurrency
Jasper	Clear Creek Township	14.455	23.263	US 65 north / Iowa 117 south – Colfax, Iowa Falls	Northern end of US 65 concurrency; northern terminus of Iowa 117; interchange; US 65 exit 98
Story	No major junctions				
Marshall	Washington Township	34.657	55.775	US 30 – Marshalltown, Ames	Interchange; US 30 exit 179
Marshall	Taylor Township	47.748	76.843	Iowa 14 – Marshalltown, Conrad	Eastern terminus
1.000 mi = 1.609 km; 1.000 km = 0.621 mi
