= Iowa Highway 14 =

State highway in Iowa, United States

Iowa Highway 14
- Iowa 14 highlighted in red

Route information
- Maintained by Iowa DOT
- Length: 187.838 mi (302.296 km)

Major junctions
- South end: Iowa 2 in Corydon
- US 34 at Chariton; Iowa 5 / Iowa 92 at Knoxville; Iowa 163 at Monroe; I-80 / US 6 at Newton; US 30 at Marshalltown; US 20 near Grundy Center, Iowa; Iowa 3 at Allison; US 18 / US 218 / Iowa 27 at Charles City
- North end: US 18 / US 218 Bus. in Charles City

Location
- Country: United States
- State: Iowa
- Counties: Wayne; Lucas; Marion; Jasper; Marshall; Grundy; Butler; Floyd

Highway system
- Iowa Primary Highway System; Interstate; US; State; Secondary; Scenic
← Iowa 13	→ Iowa 15

Iowa Highway 14 (Iowa 14) is a state highway that runs from north to south across the state of Iowa for 188 miles (303 km). The begins in Corydon at an intersection with Iowa 2 and ends in Charles City at an intersection with U.S. Highway 18 (US 18) and US 218 Business.

== Route description ==
Iowa Highway 14 begins in Corydon at Iowa 2. It goes north past Millerton and intersects US 34 in Chariton. After leaving Chariton going north, it turns northeast near Williamson, then turns north shortly before intersecting Iowa 5 and Iowa 92 at Knoxville. In Knoxville, the road passes east of Knoxville Raceway and the National Sprint Car Hall of Fame & Museum. It continues north past the locally famous "Mile Long Bridge", which carries the highway across Lake Red Rock, and then intersects Iowa 163 in Monroe. It proceeds north to Newton, where it intersects Interstate 80 and a short overlap with US 6 begins. The overlap ends as it skirts the eastern edge of Lambs Grove. It continues north, then turns east and turns north again when it intersects Iowa 224. It continues north through Laurel, then intersects US 30 at the southern edge of Marshalltown.

Iowa 14 then goes through Marshalltown and then intersects Iowa 330 and Iowa 96 before intersecting Iowa 175 west of Grundy Center. Iowa 14 and Iowa 175 then overlap into Grundy Center. Iowa 14 turns north at Grundy Center and intersects U.S. Highway 20 before meeting Iowa 57 near Parkersburg. They overlap through Parkersburg, then Iowa 14 turns north. It continues north until Iowa 3, with which it overlaps for one mile (1.6 km) near Allison. It continues north west of Allison through Greene, goes through Roseville, then turns east towards Charles City. West of Charles City, it intersects US 18, US 218, and Iowa 27, the Iowa designation for the Avenue of the Saints. It continues east into downtown Charles City and ends at another intersection with US 18.

== History ==
Iowa Highway 14 was established July 1, 1920, when the Iowa highway system was established. On May 1, 2006, Iowa 14 was extended further into Charles City to intersect US 18, which was rerouted around Charles City that day.

== Major intersections ==
County	Location	mi	km	Destinations	Notes
Wayne	Corydon	0.000	0.000	Iowa 2 (Jefferson Street) – Centerville, Leon	
Lucas	Chariton	17.335	27.898	US 34 – Osceola, Albia	
Lucas	Chariton	17.959	28.902	US 34 Bus. east (7th Street)	Southern end of US 34 Business overlap
Lucas	Chariton	18.201	29.292	US 34 Bus. east (Court Avenue) – Business District	Northern end of US 34 Business overlap
Marion	Knoxville	42.639	68.621	Iowa 5 / Iowa 92 – Indianola, Oskaloosa	Iowa 5 exit 62
Marion	Knoxville	43.811	70.507	Iowa 92 Business (Pleasant Street)	
Jasper	Monroe	57.132	91.945	Iowa 163 – Des Moines, Oskaloosa	Exit 29 along Iowa 163
Jasper	Newton	69.349	111.606	I-80 / US 6 west – Des Moines, Davenport	Southern end of US 6 overlap; exit 164 along I-80
Jasper	Newton	70.439	113.361	US 6 east (1st Avenue West) – Lambs Grove, Newton, Business District	Northern end of US 6 overlap
Jasper	Mariposa Township	86.071	138.518	Iowa 224 south – Kellogg	
Marshall	Marshalltown	98.899	159.163	US 30 – Ames, Cedar Rapids	Exit 185 along US 30
Marshall	Marshalltown	99.115	159.510	US 30 Bus. (Iowa Avenue)	
Marshall	Taylor Township	107.419	172.874	Iowa 330 south – Albion	
Marshall	Liscomb Township	111.416	179.307	Iowa 96 east – Gladbrook	
Grundy	Melrose Township	123.339	198.495	Iowa 175 west – Eldora	Southern end of Iowa 175 overlap
Grundy	Grundy Center	130.613	210.201	Iowa 175 east (G Avenue)	Northern end of Iowa 175 overlap
Grundy	Colfax–Lincoln township line	137.608	221.459	US 20 – Fort Dodge, Waterloo	Exit 208 along US 20
Butler	Parkersburg	145.034	233.410	Iowa 57 east – Cedar Falls	Southern end of Iowa 57 overlap
Butler	Parkersburg	146.456	235.698	Iowa 57 west (Buswell Street) – Aplington, Ackley, Business District	Northern end of Iowa 57 overlap
Butler	Allison	158.014	254.299	Iowa 3 east – Shell Rock	Southern end of Iowa 3 overlap
Butler	Allison	159.019	255.916	Iowa 3 west – Dumont, Hampton	Northern end of Iowa 3 overlap
Floyd	Saint Charles Township	185.445	298.445	US 18 / US 218 / Iowa 27 – Mason City, Waterloo	Exit 214 along US 18
Floyd	Charles City	187.560	301.849	US 218 Bus. north (Gilbert Street)	Southern end of US 218 Business overlap
Floyd	Charles City	187.838	302.296	US 18 / US 218 Bus. south (Brantingham Street / 2nd Street)	Northern end of US 218 Business overlap
1.000 mi = 1.609 km; 1.000 km = 0.621 mi: Concurrency terminus
