= Alice Bellvadore Sams Turner =

American physician (1859–1915)

Alice Bellvadore Sams Turner M.D.
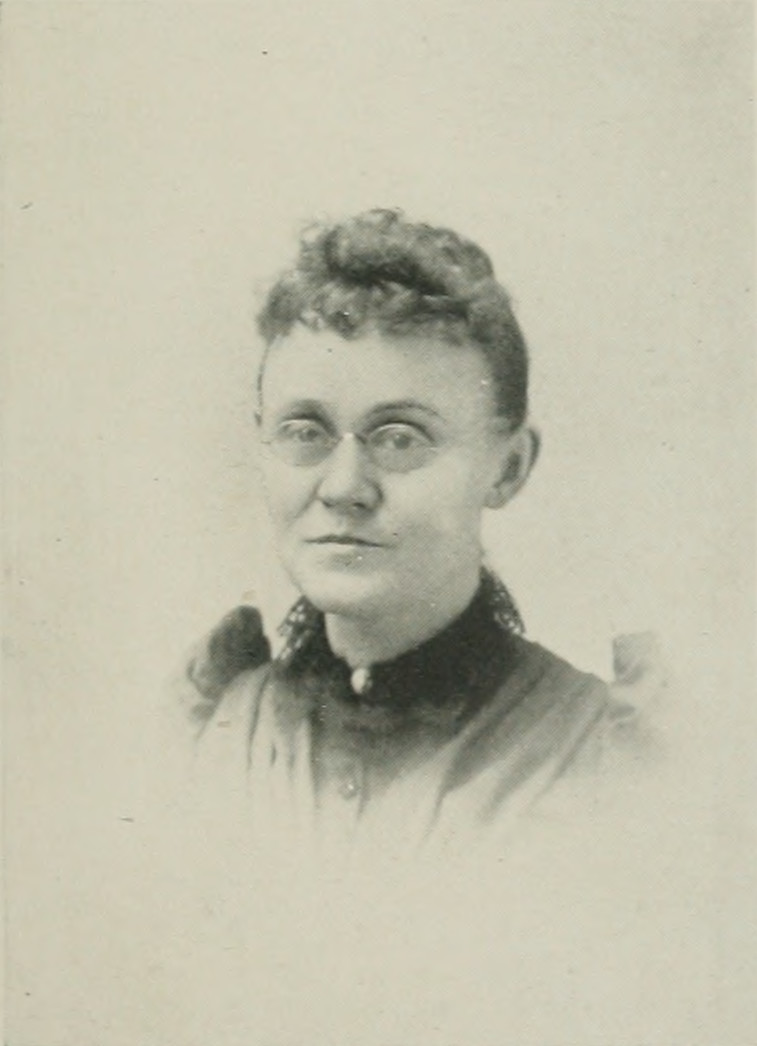
- Photo in A Woman of the Century
- Born: Alice Bellvadore Sams; March 13, 1859; Mingo, Iowa, U.S.
- Died: October 10, 1915 (aged 56)
- Education: College of Physicians and Surgeons in Keokuk, Iowa
- Occupations: Physician, school teacher, writer
- Spouse: Lewis C. S. Turner (m. 1878; died 1959)

Alice Bellvadore Sams Turner (or Sams-Turner; also known as Alice B. S. Turner; March 13/18, 1859 – July 10, 1915) was an American physician, who also taught school, and was a frequent contributor to the public press. She graduated with the Class of 1884 from the Keokuk College of Physicians and Surgeons as an allopathic doctor. Turner practised medicine in Colfax, Iowa, from March, 1884. She was a member of the Iowa State Medical Society; Iowa Public Health Association, having been the first woman admitted to membership, in 1890, of the State Library Association; Colfax Public Library Association, secretary four years, 1893–97; Chautauqua Literary and Scientific Circle; Woman's Christian Temperance Union; Woman's Relief Corps; Rathbone Sisters; and was health officer of Colfax, 1886–87.

== Early life and education ==
Alice Bellvadore Sams was born near Mingo, Iowa, (Note: Willard & Livermore (1893) recorded Turner's date and place of birth as March 18, 1859, "near Greencastle, Iowa".) (Note: Watson (1896) recorded Turner's date and place of birth as March 13, 1859, at Greencastle, Iowa.) Turner was the daughter of John and Evaline (Humphreys) Sams, the former the son of Edmund and Sarah Sams, and her mother was the daughter of Moses and Rebecca (Boyd) Humphreys. Both her grandfathers served in the war of 1812 with the Tennessee troops. John Sams was born in Sullivan County, Tennessee, in 1813 and there he spent his boyhood, moving to Logan County, Illinois, in 1833, when that country was practically a wilderness. From there he came to Jasper County, Iowa, in 1853 and again began life as a pioneer. He first married Mary Vandevender, who was born in Virginia in 1834 and her death occurred in 1851, leaving three children, David E.. Margaret and Sarah. In 1852, while a resident of Logan County, Illinois, he married Evaline (Humphreys) Hilton, who was born May 10, 1824, in eastern Tennessee. To this marriage, four children were born: Alfred, Emily, Alice, and Francis M. John Sams, born January 8, 1813, was a successful farmer, in fact, for many years he was one of the leading agriculturists of the county, being the owner of about 640 acres (260 ha) there. He was influential in the affairs of his community, serving as township trustee and school director. He was an active Democrat. His death occurred on April 9, 1891, his widow surviving until August 19, 1902.

Her paternal grandparents, Moses and Rebecca (Boyd) Humphreys, were natives of Carter County, Tennessee, and in an early day, they moved to Logan County, Illinois, where they lived until 1853, when they came to Jasper County. Iowa, thus starting life twice under pioneer conditions, and here they spent the rest of their lives.

Turner grew up and received her common school training in her home community, where she also assisted in household duties until 1873. Her preparatory education was obtained at Lincoln (Illinois) University; Simpson College, Indianola, Iowa; and Mitchell Seminary, Mitchellville, Iowa. From 1873 until 1878, she was alternately engaged as teacher and pupil, teaching in school in Jasper and Shelby counties.

== Career ==
On October 21, 1878, she married Lewis C. S. Turner (d. May 18, 1915). He was struggling to make a career in the field of education. The first year after their marriage, they were engaged in teaching, and the next year they became students again. Her husband gave instruction in penmanship and drawing, which paid for their books and tuition. Turner, besides her school work, superintended and did a great portion of the work herself for boarders among their classmates, thus helping further to defray expenses. In 1880, in their last year's classes, the school building where they were studying, in Mitchellville, Iowa, was sold for a State industrial institution, and they had to relinquish their goals.

In 1880, she began to study medicine under J. J. M. Angear, M.D. She took three courses of lectures at the College of Physicians and Surgeons in Keokuk, Iowa. There, in addition to their school work, the husband and wife held the positions of steward and matron of the hospital for one year. In October, 1881, a daughter was born to them. Turner entered her class when her infant was a month old, and was graduated in February, 1884, with high ranking.

Both having graduated with medical degrees, they went to Colfax, Iowa in 1884, where they enjoyed a large and lucrative practice, with the exception of two years, from 1898 to 1900, inclusive, spent in Chicago. Besides their general practice, they established an infirmary for the cure of inebriety, the Turner Rest Home and Sanitarium.

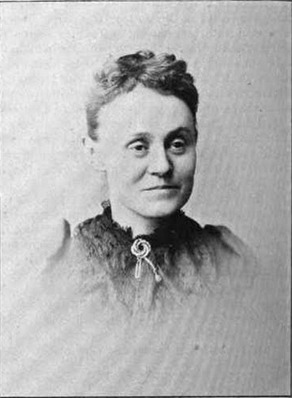
1896

Turner was an honorary member of the Jasper County Medical Society and a member of the State Society of Iowa Medical Women. She identified with everything that stood for the betterment of humanity, and was a woman of keen intellect and high literary attainments. She was the first woman admitted to membership in the Iowa Health and Protective Association, and was the first woman in Iowa to serve in the capacity of health officer which place she occupied during 1886 and 1887.

Turner was one of the founders of the Colfax Free Public Library. She served on the board of trustees for a number of years and had been president of the board for the last twelve years of her life. Interested in all that pertains to society and state, she maintained a regular clipping bureau and especially in connection with the life and history of Colfax and vicinity.

Turner was a frequent contributor to the public press. She also read many papers before literary and medical societies. Turner read a paper on “Physical Culture,” before the teachers' institute, February 21, 1885; “Hygiene of Bathing,” Chautauqua assembly, June 24, 1890; “Climacteric Period,” “Epileptic Mania,” “The Tongue in Health and Disease,” and “Mineral Acids,” before the Jasper County Medical Society, 1887–89.

== Personal life ==
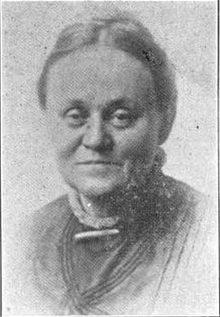
1915

On July 24, 1874, Turner began keeping a diary, a daily record of transpiring events of interest through most of the rest of her life, and she induced her son and daughter to begin keeping a daily journal. These children were Vera (born October 2, 1881); and Carroll John Turner (born March 28, 1893). She died at her home in Colfax, July 10, 1915, from carcinoma of the breast. (Note: The Iowa State Medical Society reported cause of death as carcinoma of the stomach.)

== Selected works ==
- In memoriam : John Sams (1813-1891), Susan Evaline Sams (1824-1902)., 1902
