= Grinnell–Newburg Community School District =

Public school district in Grinnell, Iowa, United States

Coordinates: 41.750523°N 92.738355°W

Location
- Grinnell, Iowa Poweshiek and Jasper counties United States
- Coordinates: 41.750523, -92.738355

District information
- Type: Local school district
- Grades: K–12
- Established: 1855
- Superintendent: Dr. Janet Stutz
- Budget: $25,999,000 (2020-21)
- NCES District ID: 1913200

Students and staff
- Students: 1573
- Teachers: 112.96 FTE
- Staff: 135.69 FTE
- Student–teacher ratio: 13.93
- Athletic conference: WaMaC Conference
- District mascot: Tiger
- Colors: Orange and black

Other information
- Website: www.grinnell-k12.org

The Grinnell–Newburg Community School District is a rural public school district in Iowa that serves the cities of Grinnell and Oakland Acres, the unincorporated community of Newburg, as well as surrounding rural areas in western Poweshiek and far eastern Jasper counties.

Janet Stutz was hired as superintendent in 2016.

== Schools ==
The district has a total of five school buildings, all of which are located in Grinnell.

- Bailey Park Elementary, serving grades K–3
- Fairview Elementary, serving pre-K and K–3
- Grinnell Community Middle School (4-8)
- Grinnell Community High School (9–12)

The district formerly operated a school in Newburg. The building is now privately owned.

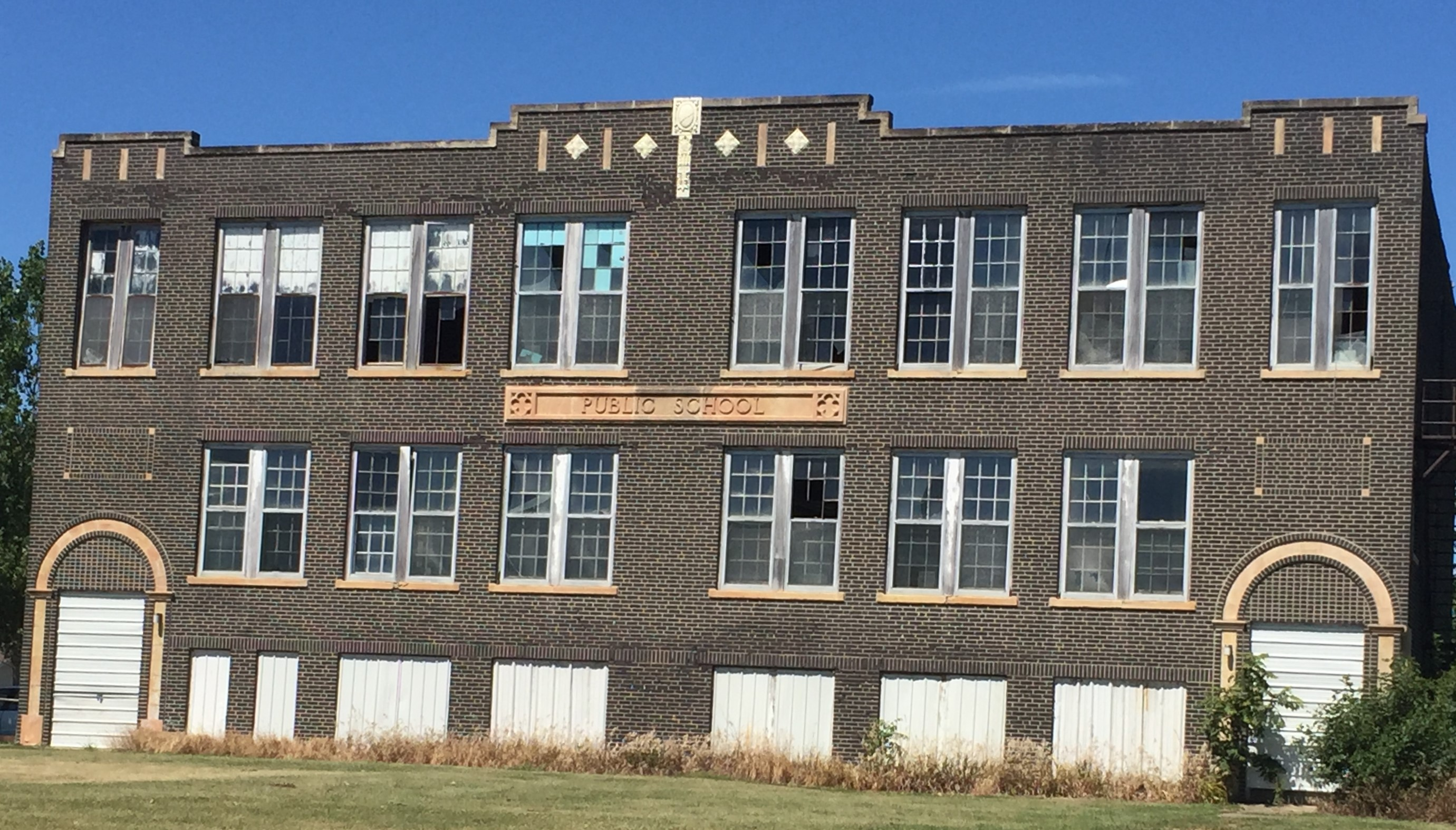
Newburg School

The school's mascot is the Tiger. The school colors are orange and black.

=== Grinnell Community High School ===
==== Athletics ====
The Tigers compete in the WaMaC Conference in the following sports:

- Baseball
- Basketball (boys and girls)
  - Boys' - 1922 state champions
- Bowling (boys and girls)
- Cross country (boys and girls)
  - Boys' - 1963 state champions
- Football
- Golf (boys and girls)
  - Boys' - 1988 state champions
  - Girls' - 6-time state champions (1977, 1983, 1991, 2001, 2002, 2003)
- Soccer (boys and girls)
- Softball
- Swimming (boys and girls)
- Tennis (boys and girls)
- Track and field (boys and girls)
- Volleyball
- Wrestling

== See also ==
- List of school districts in Iowa
- List of high schools in Iowa
- WaMaC Conference
