= Galesburg, Iowa =

- Unincorporated community
- Location within Iowa
- Coordinates: 41°33′32″N 92°56′47″W
- Country: United States
- State: Iowa
- County: Jasper
- Elevation: 896 ft (273 m)
- Time zone: UTC-6 (Central (CST))
  - Summer (DST): UTC-5 (CDT)
- GNIS feature ID: 456811

Galesburg is an unincorporated community in Jasper County, in the U.S. state of Iowa.

== Geography ==
Galesburg lies along the junction of Main Street/Sioux Avenue and Highway T14 S.

== History ==
Galesburg was platted on Section 16 of Elk Creek Township. In 1878 it was described as "a little village" with a large store and a recently completed railroad.

The Galesburg post office opened in 1857 (originally under the name Galesburgh) and closed in 1904.

Galesburg was once a "thriving farm community with three grocery stores, several taverns and a hotel." The population of Galesburg was 160 in 1887, and was 88 in 1902. The population was 89 in 1917. The population was 50 in 1940.

In 2003, Iowa Governor Tom Vilsack made an official visit to Galesburg, where he planted a tree in the community's park.

== See also ==
- Green Castle, Iowa
