= Hickory Grove Township =

Hickory Grove Township may refer to the following townships in the United States:

- Hickory Grove Township, Benton County, Indiana
- Hickory Grove Township, Jasper County, Iowa
- Hickory Grove Township, Scott County, Iowa
- Hickory Grove Township, Warren County, Missouri
