= Clyde, Iowa =

- Unincorporated community
- Location within Iowa
- Coordinates: 41°50′31″N 93°15′55″W
- Country: United States
- State: Iowa
- County: Jasper
- Elevation: 974 ft (297 m)
- Time zone: UTC-6 (Central (CST))
  - Summer (DST): UTC-5 (CDT)
- GNIS feature ID: 464502

Clyde is an unincorporated community in Jasper County, in the U.S. state of Iowa. Clyde lies along the junction of North 102st Avenue W and Iowa Highway 330.

== History ==
Clyde was founded in Section 11 on Clear Creek Township. The Maxwell and Company store opened in Clyde in 1868, and a Methodist church was founded in 1874. A fire burned the Maxwell residence in 1875. In 1878, Clyde was a village of 12 to 15 houses and several shops.

The Clyde post office opened in 1858 and closed in 1904.

The population of Clyde was 50 in 1887, and was 44 in 1902. The population had decreased to 26 in 1917.
