= Mound Prairie Township =

Mound Prairie Township may refer to the following townships in the United States:

- Mound Prairie Township, Jasper County, Iowa
- Mound Prairie Township, Houston County, Minnesota
