= Green Castle, Iowa =

- Unincorporated community
- Location within Iowa
- Coordinates: 41°44′46″N 93°15′42″W
- Country: United States
- State: Iowa
- County: Jasper
- Elevation: 915 ft (279 m)
- Time zone: UTC-6 (Central (CST))
  - Summer (DST): UTC-5 (CDT)
- GNIS feature ID: 457098

Green Castle, also spelled Greencastle, is an unincorporated community in Jasper County, in the U.S. state of Iowa.

== Geography ==
Green Castle lies along the junction of North 51st Avenue W and West 112th Street N, a half mile west of Iowa Highway 117.

== History ==
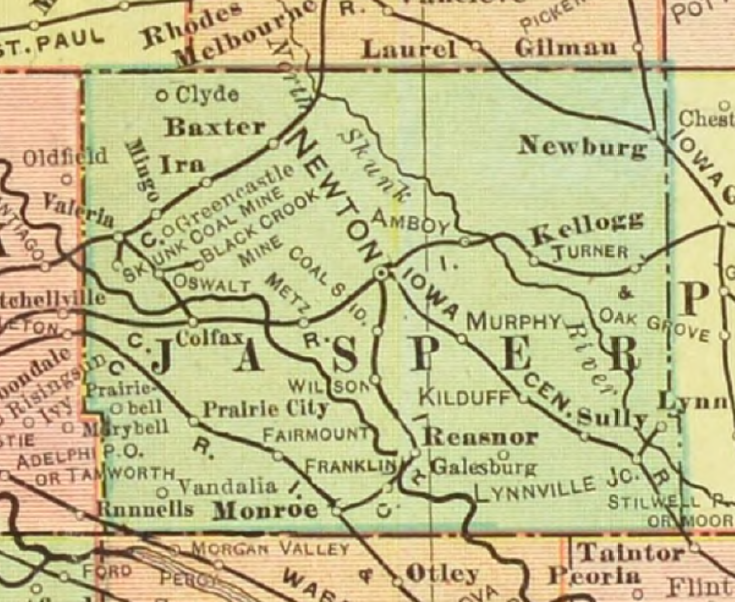
Greencastle in northwestern Jasper County, Iowa, 1902

Greencastle was platted in Section 16 of Powesheik Township. The first settler, in 1846, was Joseph Slaughter. A school was built there in 1849, a flour mill followed in 1875, and in 1878 15 buildings were constructed in Greencastle.

The Greencastle post office opened in August 1856 and closed in December 1901.

The population of Greencastle was 125 in 1887, and was 42 in 1902.

== See also ==
Vandalia, Iowa
