= Iowa Highway 117 =

State highway in Iowa, United States

Iowa Highway 117
- Iowa 117 highlighted in red

Route information
- Maintained by Iowa DOT
- Length: 18.562 mi (29.873 km)
- Existed: June 20, 1939–present

Major junctions
- South end: Iowa 163 at Prairie City
- I-80 / US 6 at Colfax
- North end: US 65 / Iowa 330 near Mingo

Location
- Country: United States
- State: Iowa
- Counties: Jasper

Highway system
- Iowa Primary Highway System; Interstate; US; State; Secondary; Scenic
← Iowa 116	→ Iowa 122

Iowa Highway 117 is a north–south route in Jasper County. The length of the highway is 18 miles (29 km). In addition to serving several communities directly, Highway 117 also provides a shortcut between U.S. Route 65 and Interstate 80 east of Des Moines.

== Route description ==
Iowa Highway 117 begins at a partial cloverleaf interchange with Iowa 163 on the edge of Prairie City. For its first mile (1.6 km), Iowa 117 runs west-to-east along Second Street, a former alignment of Iowa 163. At its former southern end, State Street, it turns north approaching the center of town. North of Prairie City, Iowa 117 travels due north for 5 miles (8.0 km) until Colfax.

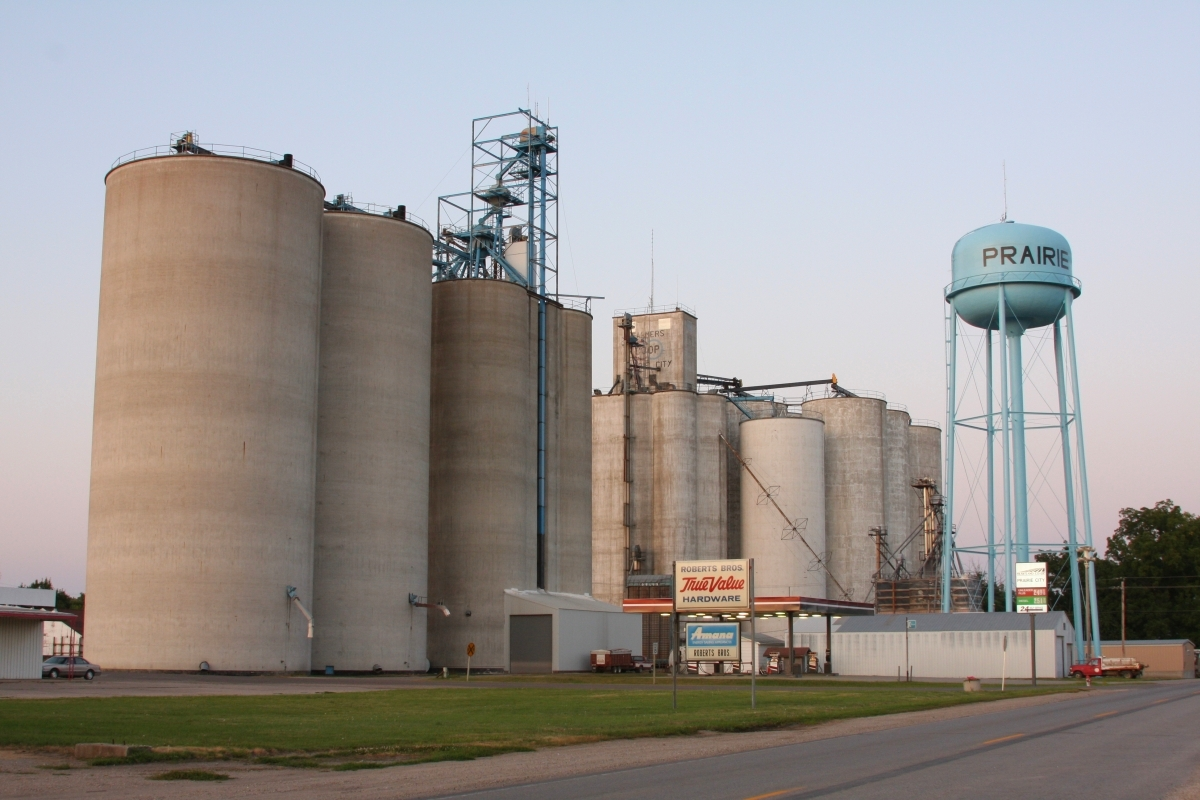
Iowa 117 passes a grain elevator in Prairie City

At Colfax, Iowa 117 turns west onto State Street. Outside of Colfax, State Street is Jasper County Road F48, which connects Mitchellville and Newton. After 3/4 mile (1.2 km), the highway turns north towards downtown Colfax where it crosses an Iowa Interstate Railroad line and the South Skunk River. One mile north of the river is a diamond interchange with Interstate 80 and U.S. Highway 6.

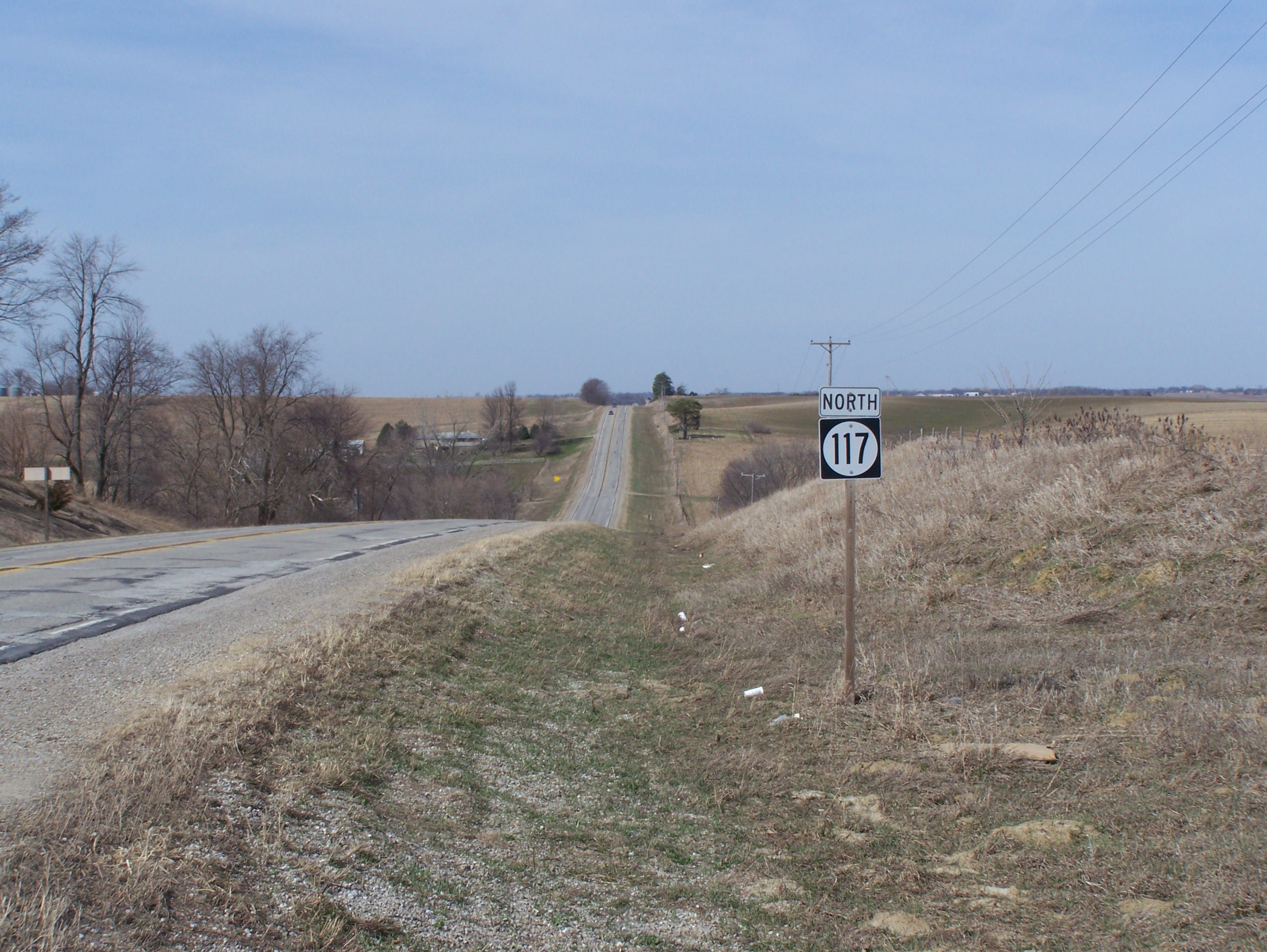
Iowa 117 in rural Jasper County south of Mingo.

North of Colfax, Iowa 117 passes through rolling farmland with houses dotted along the road. Three miles (4.8 km) from Mingo, the highway begins curving to the north and west, parallel to Indian Creek. The last four miles (6.4 km) of Iowa 117 travel on creek bottoms, still adjacent to Indian Creek. Just 500 yards (460 m) from its northern end, Iowa 117 crosses Indian Creek one final time. It ends an interchange with U.S. Highway 65 and Iowa Highway 330. The dominant road is a four-lane expressway connecting Des Moines and Marshalltown. North of the Iowa 117 intersection, the expressway is only Iowa 330 while to the south it is US 65 and Iowa 330.

== History ==
Between July 1, 1920, and June 20, 1939, the road currently designated as Iowa Highway 117 was designated as Iowa Highway 64, while the original Iowa Highway 117 served as a highway between Anamosa and Sabula. The two highway designations were swapped on June 20, 1939. The highway originally extended northward to Colo until 1940, when the segment between the current northern terminus and Colo was replaced by US 65.

In 2002, the northern terminus intersection was reconstructed. Previously, the roads which met at that point intersected one another at a sharp angle. The 2002 reconstruction changed this so the involved highways intersected at right angles to each other. This intersection was reconfigured again fifteen years later when an interchange was built about a mile north of the intersection. The location of the interchange created some controversy because it was built on century farmland.

== Major intersections ==
The entire route is in Jasper County.

Location	mi	km	Destinations	Notes
Prairie City	0.000	0.000	Iowa 163 – Monroe, Pleasant Hill, Des Moines, Pella	
Colfax	8.328	13.403	I-80 / US 6 – Des Moines, Davenport	
Mingo	18.562	29.873	US 65 / Iowa 330 – Des Moines, Marshalltown, Iowa Falls	Road continues as US 65 north
1.000 mi = 1.609 km; 1.000 km = 0.621 mi
