= Mariposa Township =

Mariposa Township may refer to one of the following places:

== In Canada ==
- Mariposa Township, Ontario

== In the United States ==
- Mariposa Township, Jasper County, Iowa
- Mariposa Township, Saunders County, Nebraska
