= Rushville =

Rushville may refer to a place in the United States:

- Rushville, Illinois
- Rushville, Indiana
- Rushville, Iowa
- Rushville, Missouri
- Rushville, Nebraska
- Rushville, New York
- Rushville, Ohio
