= Murphy, Iowa =

- former unincorporated community
- Location within Iowa
- Coordinates: 41°39′30″N 92°58′26″W
- Country: United States
- State: Iowa
- County: Jasper
- Elevation: 823 ft (251 m)
- Time zone: UTC-6 (Central (CST))
  - Summer (DST): UTC-5 (CDT)
- GNIS feature ID: 464220

Murphy is a former unincorporated community in Jasper County, in the U.S. state of Iowa.

== Geography ==
Murphy was located on what is now Legion Street, along the banks of Elk Creek, at 41°39′30″N 92°58′26″W

== History ==
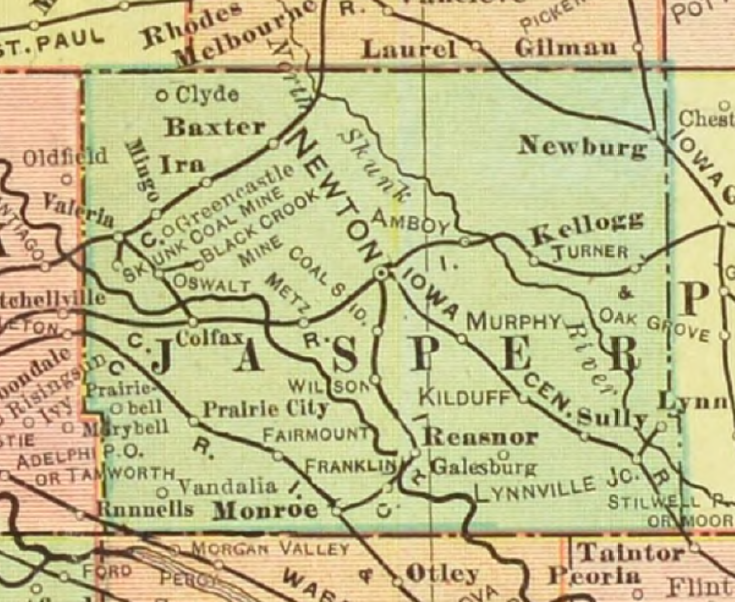
Murphy in central Jasper County, Iowa, in 1902

Murphy was named after the first settler in the area, John W. Murphy, who settled the area in 1847. J.W. Murphy also served as postmaster and as the master of the Buena Vista Grange. The post office was established in 1890.

The community was in Buena Vista Township. Murphy never attracted many residents. The community's population was just 4 in 1902, and was 5 in 1915. Around this time, Murphy was considered a village.

The community had a baseball diamond. The Murphy baseball team played against other teams in the Jasper County League.

The Murphy post office closed on January 15, 1911. Thereafter, mail was routed though nearby Newton.

The store at Murphy closed in 1937. The population of Murphy was 27 in 1940. The rail line was removed in 1950.

== See also ==
- Zook Spur, Iowa, another central Iowa ghost town
