= Ira, Iowa =

- Unincorporated community
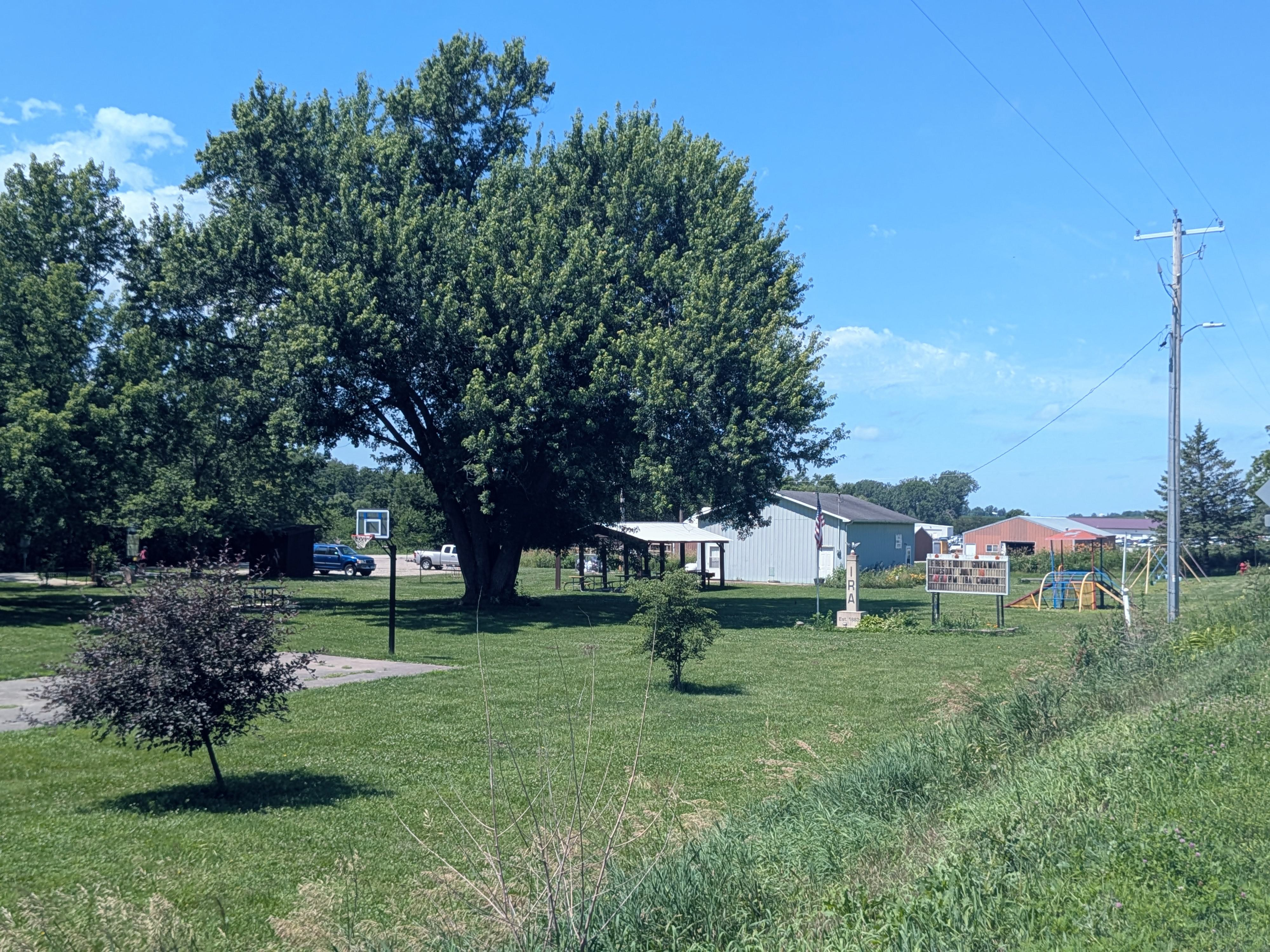
- Ira town park

- Location within the state of Iowa Ira (the United States)
- Coordinates: 41°46′40″N 93°12′21″W
- Country: United States
- State: Iowa
- County: Jasper
- Elevation: 856 ft (261 m)
- Time zone: UTC-6 (Central (CST))
  - Summer (DST): UTC-5 (CDT)
- ZIP codes: 50127

Ira (/ˈaɪrə/) is an unincorporated community located in Independence Township, Jasper County, Iowa, United States. The population in 2010 was 29 people.

== History ==
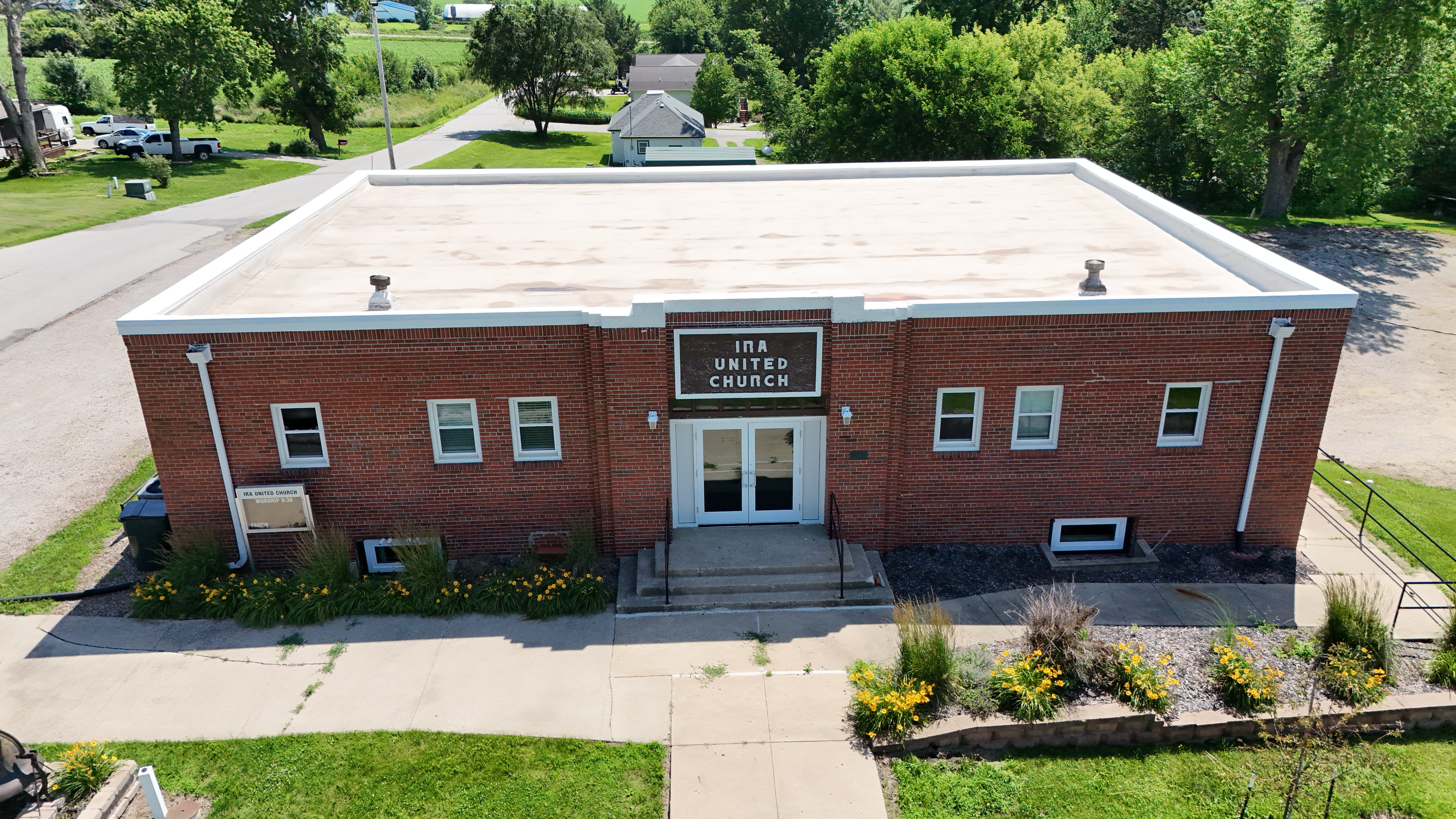
Ira United Church

Ira was platted in 1883. It was originally called Millard. Ira's population was 20 in 1887, and was 79 in 1902. The population was 80 in 1940.

== Education ==
Colfax–Mingo Community School District operates area public schools. The Colfax and Mingo school districts consolidated on July 1, 1985.
