= Colfax–Mingo Community School District =

Public school district in Colfax, Iowa, United States

Coordinates: 41.678102°N 92.230907°W

Location
- Colfax, Iowa Jasper County United States
- Coordinates: 41.678102, -93.230907

District information
- Type: Local school district
- Grades: K–12
- Established: 1985
- Superintendent: Tim Salmon
- Schools: 2
- Budget: $12,277,000 (2020-21)
- NCES District ID: 1900009

Students and staff
- Students: 724 (2022-23)
- Teachers: 57.76 FTE
- Staff: 58.49 FTE
- Student–teacher ratio: 12.53
- Athletic conference: South Iowa Cedar League
- District mascot: Tigerhawks
- Colors: Navy and orange

Other information
- Website: www.colfax-mingo.k12.ia.us/index.php

Colfax–Mingo Community School District is a rural public school district headquartered in Colfax, Iowa.

Located in Jasper County, it serves Colfax, Mingo, Ira, Valeria, and the portion of Mitchellville in Jasper County.

The Colfax and Mingo school districts consolidated on July 1, 1985.

== History ==
The Poweshiek township school district (including Mingo) was organized by 1849. The independent district of Colfax was formed in April, 1876. Later that year, a bond was passed for $3,500 for the erection of a suitable school building in Colfax.

In 1910, the Colfax school had 15 teachers and an enrollment of 706, and the Poweshiek township schools had an enrollment of 244.

== Schools ==
The district operates two schools, both located in Colfax.

- Colfax–Mingo Elementary School
- Colfax–Mingo High School

== Colfax–Mingo High School ==
=== Athletics ===
The Tigerhawks compete in the South Iowa Cedar League Conference in the following sports:

- Cross Country (boys and girls)
  - Girls' State Champions - 1992, 1993
- Volleyball (girls)
- Football
- Basketball (boys and girls)
- Wrestling
- Track and Field (boys and girls)
- Golf (boys and girls)
  - 1997 Class 2A State Champions
- Baseball
- Softball
  - 2001 Class 1A State Champions

== See also ==
- List of school districts in Iowa
- List of high schools in Iowa
