= Newburg, Jasper County, Iowa =

Newburg, Iowa
- Unincorporated community
- Location within Iowa
- Coordinates: 41°49′07″N 92°46′28″W
- Country: United States
- State: Iowa
- County: Jasper
- Elevation: 1,027 ft (313 m)
- Time zone: UTC-6 (Central (CST))
  - Summer (DST): UTC-5 (CDT)
- GNIS feature ID: 459502

Newburg is an unincorporated community in Jasper County, in the U.S. state of Iowa.

== Geography ==
Newburg lies near the junction of county highway T38 and F17 (Newburg Road).

== History ==
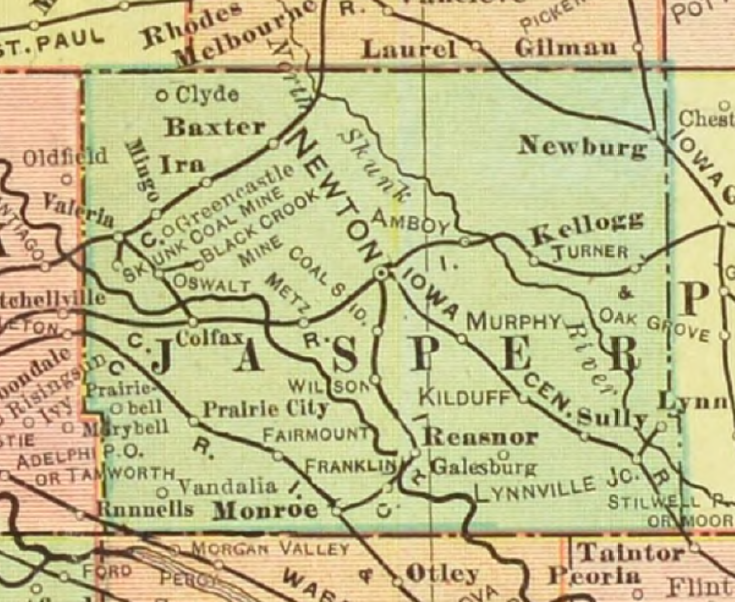
Newburg in northeastern Jasper County, Iowa, in 1902

A post office at Newburg (originally spelled Newburgh) opened in 1878. The post office closed in January 1954.

The Newburg Church was built in 1896; the congregation previously met at the Newburg schoolhouse. In 1996, the Newburg Church's congregation merged with the Chester congregation to become the Newburg Chester Church.

The population of Newburg was estimated at 200 in 1887, and was 41 in 1902. The population was 135 in 1940.

On March 5, 2022, an EF2 tornado struck the community, damaging several homes.

== See also ==
- Vandalia, Iowa
