= Malaka Township, Jasper County, Iowa =

Township in Jasper County, Iowa

Coordinates: 41.8161°N 93.0483°W

Malaka Township is a township in Jasper County, Iowa, United States.

== History ==
Malaka Township was established in 1857.
