= Fairview Township, Jasper County, Iowa =

Township in Jasper County, Iowa

Coordinates: 41.5603°N 93.0878°W

Fairview Township is a township in Jasper County, Iowa, United States.

== History ==
Fairview Township was established in 1846.
