= Fairmount, Iowa =

- Unincorporated community
- Location within Iowa
- Coordinates: 41°34′00″N 93°09′34″W
- Country: United States
- State: Iowa
- County: Jasper
- Elevation: 925 ft (282 m)
- Time zone: UTC-6 (Central (CST))
  - Summer (DST): UTC-5 (CDT)
- GNIS feature ID: 1999552

Fairmount (or Fairmont) is an unincorporated community in Jasper County, in the U.S. state of Iowa. Fairmount lies along the junction of Iowa Highway 163 and West 70th Street South. The community has also been known as Fairmont.

== History ==
In 1878, Fairmount was described as a "town [...] beautifully situated on the level plateau of prairie separating the Des Moines and Skunk rivers. [...] There are fifteen or twenty buildings in Fairmount, and four or five business houses." In addition, Fairmount had a Methodist Episcopal church, built in 1878, and a rail station on the Keokuk and Des Moines Railway.

The Fairmount post office opened in 1876 and closed in 1918.

The population of Fairmount was 50 in 1887, and was 108 in 1902. The population was 31 in 1917, and 45 in 1925. The population was 14 in 1940.
