= Richland Township, Jasper County, Iowa =

Township in Jasper County, Iowa

Coordinates: 41.6436°N 92.8342°W

Richland Township is a township in Jasper County, Iowa, United States.

As of the 2020 census, it has a total population of 374.

== History ==
Richland Township was established in 1860.
