= Oakland Acres, Iowa =

- City
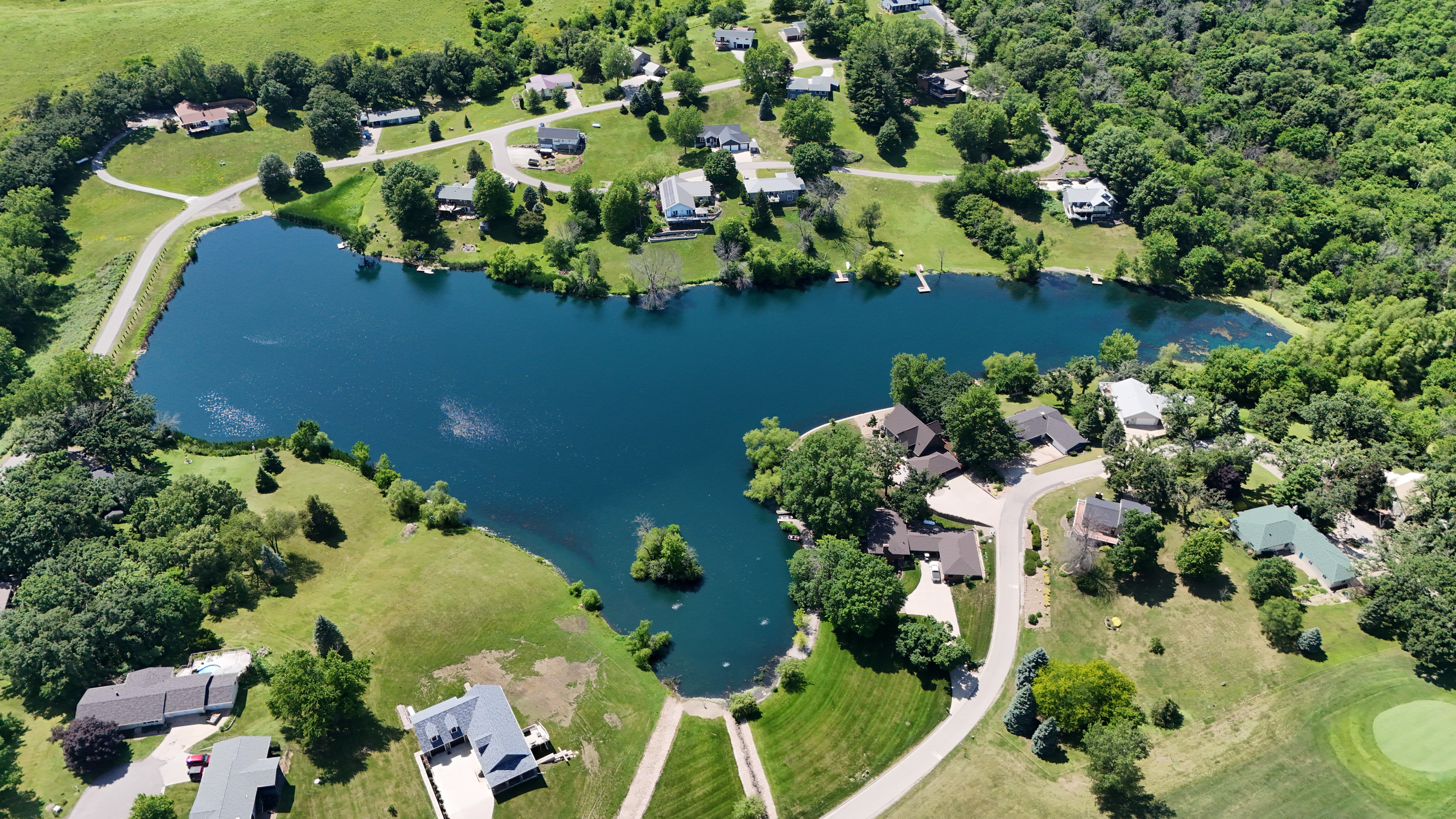
- A small lake in Oakland Acres

- Location of Oakland Acres, Iowa
- Coordinates: 41°43′2″N 92°49′30″W
- Country: United States
- State: Iowa
- County: Jasper

Area
  - Total: 0.31 sq mi (0.79 km^{2})
  - Land: 0.29 sq mi (0.74 km^{2})
  - Water: 0.019 sq mi (0.05 km^{2})
- Elevation: 980 ft (300 m)

Population (2020)
  - Total: 176
  - Density: 617.5/sq mi (238.41/km^{2})
- Time zone: UTC-6 (Central (CST))
  - Summer (DST): UTC-5 (CDT)
- ZIP code: 50112
- Area code: 641
- FIPS code: 19-58170
- GNIS feature ID: 0464678
- Website: www.cityofoaklandacres.org

Oakland Acres is a city in Jasper County, Iowa, United States. The population was 176 at the time of the 2020 census.

== Geography ==
Oakland Acres is located at 41°43′2″N 92°49′30″W (41.717154, -92.825109).

According to the United States Census Bureau, the city has a total area of 0.30 square miles (0.78 km^{2}), of which 0.28 square miles (0.73 km^{2}) is land and 0.02 square miles (0.05 km^{2}) is water.

== Demographics ==
Historical populations
Year	Pop.	±%
1980	139	—
1990	152	+9.4%
2000	166	+9.2%
2010	156	−6.0%
2020	176	+12.8%
Source:"U.S. Census website". United States Census Bureau. and Iowa Data Center; Source: U.S. Decennial Census

=== 2020 census ===
As of the census of 2020, there were 176 people, 68 households, and 57 families residing in the city. The population density was 617.5 inhabitants per square mile (238.4/km^{2}). There were 68 housing units at an average density of 238.6 per square mile (92.1/km^{2}). The racial makeup of the city was 96.0% White, 0.0% Black or African American, 0.6% Native American, 0.0% Asian, 0.0% Pacific Islander, 0.0% from other races and 3.4% from two or more races. Hispanic or Latino persons of any race comprised 1.7% of the population.

Of the 68 households, 42.6% of which had children under the age of 18 living with them, 67.6% were married couples living together, 13.2% were cohabitating couples, 8.8% had a female householder with no spouse or partner present and 10.3% had a male householder with no spouse or partner present. 16.2% of all households were non-families. 7.4% of all households were made up of individuals, 5.9% had someone living alone who was 65 years old or older.

The median age in the city was 49.3 years. 23.9% of the residents were under the age of 20; 2.8% were between the ages of 20 and 24; 17.0% were from 25 and 44; 30.7% were from 45 and 64; and 25.6% were 65 years of age or older. The gender makeup of the city was 51.1% male and 48.9% female.

=== 2010 census ===
As of the census of 2010, there were 156 people, 66 households, and 47 families living in the city. The population density was 557.1 inhabitants per square mile (215.1/km^{2}). There were 66 housing units at an average density of 235.7 per square mile (91.0/km^{2}). The racial makeup of the city was 98.1% White, 0.6% African American, and 1.3% Asian. Hispanic or Latino of any race were 3.2% of the population.

There were 66 households, of which 22.7% had children under the age of 18 living with them, 65.2% were married couples living together, 3.0% had a female householder with no husband present, 3.0% had a male householder with no wife present, and 28.8% were non-families. 21.2% of all households were made up of individuals, and 9.1% had someone living alone who was 65 years of age or older. The average household size was 2.36 and the average family size was 2.72.

The median age in the city was 46.8 years. 17.3% of residents were under the age of 18; 5.8% were between the ages of 18 and 24; 23.2% were from 25 to 44; 37.2% were from 45 to 64; and 16.7% were 65 years of age or older. The gender makeup of the city was 51.3% male and 48.7% female.

=== 2000 census ===
As of the census of 2000, there were 166 people, 62 households, and 47 families living in the city. The population density was 626.7 inhabitants per square mile (242.0/km^{2}). There were 64 housing units at an average density of 241.6 per square mile (93.3/km^{2}). The racial makeup of the city was 97.59% White, 0.60% African American and 1.81% Asian.

There were 62 households, out of which 37.1% had children under the age of 18 living with them, 71.0% were married couples living together, 6.5% had a female householder with no husband present, and 22.6% were non-families. 19.4% of all households were made up of individuals, and 9.7% had someone living alone who was 65 years of age or older. The average household size was 2.68 and the average family size was 3.13.

In the city, the population was spread out, with 28.9% under the age of 18, 4.8% from 18 to 24, 26.5% from 25 to 44, 29.5% from 45 to 64, and 10.2% who were 65 years of age or older. The median age was 40 years. For every 100 females, there were 104.9 males. For every 100 females age 18 and over, there were 93.4 males.

The median income for a household in the city was $48,750, and the median income for a family was $52,188. Males had a median income of $36,607 versus $25,313 for females. The per capita income for the city was $19,737. About 13.2% of families and 18.0% of the population were below the poverty line, including 41.0% of those under the age of eighteen and none of those 65 or over.

== Education ==
The Grinnell–Newburg Community School District operates local public schools.
