= Rushville, Iowa =

- former unincorporated community
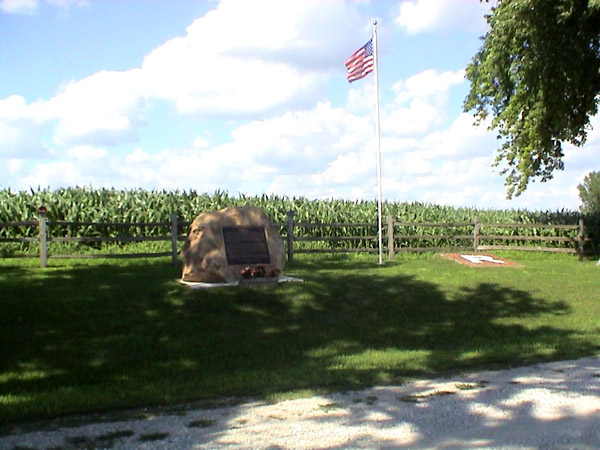
- Memorial in Rushville

- Location within the state of Iowa Rushville (the United States)
- Coordinates: 41°45′37″N 92°56′45″W
- Country: United States
- State: Iowa
- County: Jasper
- Elevation: 951 ft (290 m)
- Time zone: UTC-6 (Central (CST))
  - Summer (DST): UTC-5 (CDT)
- ZIP codes: 50135
- Area code: 641
- GNIS feature ID: 464217

Rushville is a former unincorporated community in Kellogg Township, Jasper County, Iowa, United States.

== History ==
Rushville was platted in 1857 and it had its beginnings as a stage coach shop. The only store in the town was operated by the Whitcomb family and contained the post office. Rushville had a church, several homes, and later a school.

Eventually, the railroad was constructed two miles south of Rushville, bypassing the town. This gradually led to the decline of the town. By 1915, Rushville's population had declined to just one resident.

In 1957, the school was consolidated into nearby Kellogg and the building was later demolished.

There are no longer any buildings in Rushville. Only a few nearby farms exist. A memorial plot containing a plaque, flag, and water pump remains within the city limits. Nearby Rushville Cemetery continues to be maintained.
