= Palo Alto Township, Jasper County, Iowa =

Township in Jasper County, Iowa

Coordinates: 41.6378°N 93.0494°W

Palo Alto Township is a township in Jasper County, Iowa, United States.

== History ==
Palo Alto Township was established in 1857. Its name commemorates the Battle of Palo Alto in the Mexican–American War.
