= Lynn Grove Township, Jasper County, Iowa =

Township in Jasper County, Iowa

Coordinates: 41.5489°N 92.8097°W

Lynn Grove Township is a township in Jasper County, Iowa, United States.

== History ==
Lynn Grove Township was established in 1846.
