= Washington Township, Jasper County, Iowa =

Township in Jasper County, Iowa

Coordinates: 41.6472°N 93.2986°W

Washington Township is a township in Jasper County, Iowa, United States. The township has a population of 2729 (2023).

== History ==
Washington Township was established in 1861.
