= Newton Township, Jasper County, Iowa =

Township in Jasper County, Iowa

Coordinates: 41.7347°N 93.0606°W

Newton Township is a township in Jasper County, Iowa, United States.

== History ==
Newton Township was established in 1851.
