= Killduff, Iowa =

- Unincorporated community
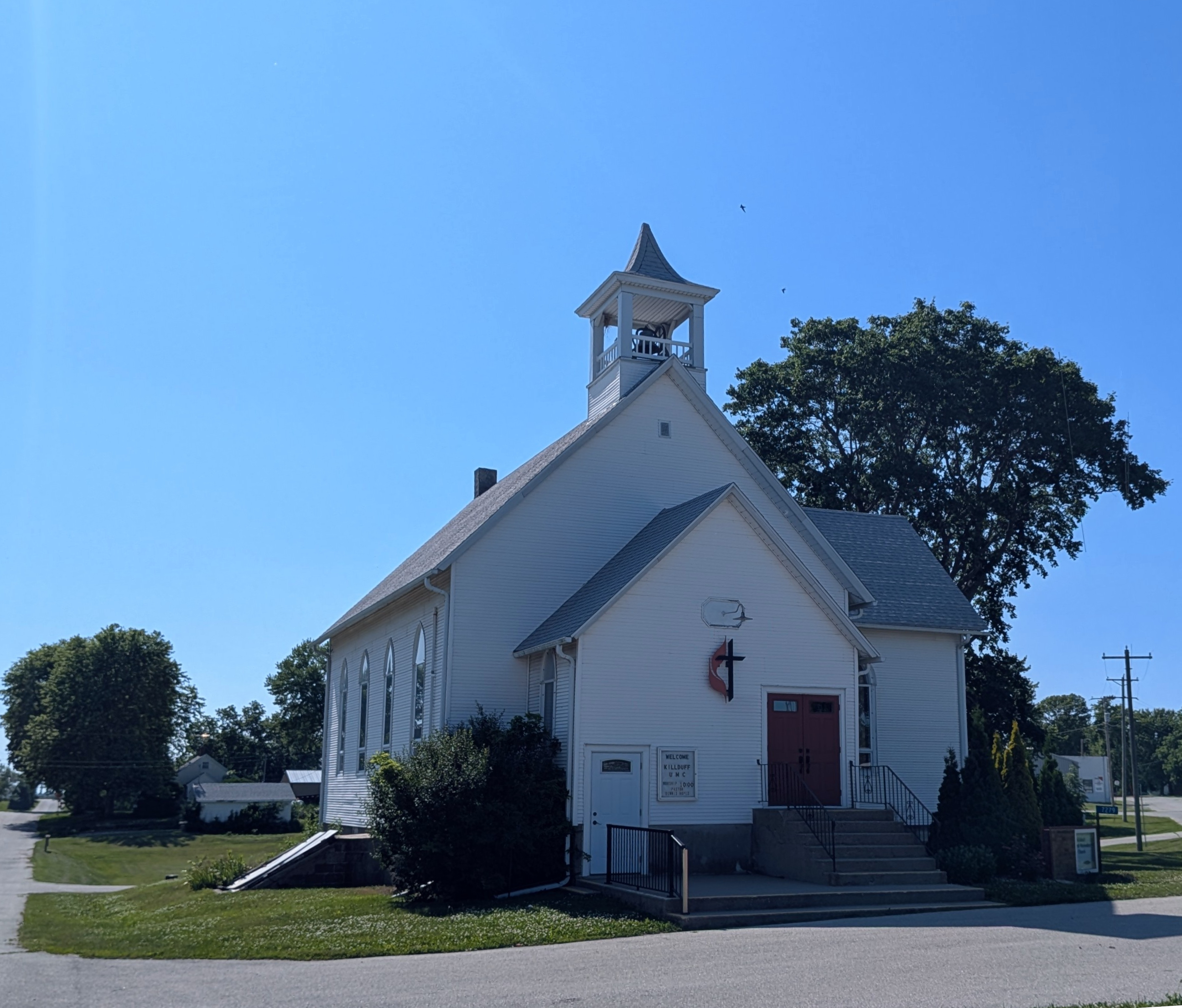
- Killduff Methodist Church

- Location within the state of Iowa Killduff (the United States)
- Coordinates: 41°36′29″N 92°54′17″W
- Country: United States
- State: Iowa
- County: Jasper
- Elevation: 922 ft (281 m)
- Time zone: UTC-6 (Central (CST))
  - Summer (DST): UTC-5 (CDT)
- ZIP codes: 50137
- GNIS feature ID: 458072

Killduff is an unincorporated community in southeastern Jasper County, Iowa, United States. It lies along local roads southeast of the city of Newton, the county seat of Jasper County.

== History ==
Killduff has a post office which opened on July 2, 1883.

Killduff was once located on the Iowa Central Railway. Killduff's population was 69 in 1902, and 85 in 1925.

In 1912, Killduff contained a post office, two stores, a lumber yard, and a blacksmith shop. The population was 85 in 1940.
