= Metz, Iowa =

- Unincorporated community
- Location within Iowa
- Coordinates: 41°39′59″N 93°08′09″W
- Country: United States
- State: Iowa
- County: Jasper
- Elevation: 810 ft (250 m)
- Time zone: UTC-6 (Central (CST))
  - Summer (DST): UTC-5 (CDT)
- GNIS feature ID: 464654

Metz is an unincorporated community in Jasper County, in the U.S. state of Iowa. Metz lies along West 62nd Street south of Interstate 80.

== History ==
A post office at Metz opened in 1875, originally named Farmersville. The name was changed to Metz in 1877 and the post office closed in 1918. Metz was founded on the Chicago, Rock Island and Pacific Railroad.

The Metz Community Church was founded in 1911, and still operates today. Around 1918, Metz also boasted three auto repair shops, two general stores, and two coal stores.

The population of Metz was 36 in 1902, was 31 in 1917, and was 65 in 1925. The population was 20 in 1940.
