= Rock Creek Township, Jasper County, Iowa =

Township in Jasper County, Iowa

Coordinates: 41.7256°N 92.8219°W

Rock Creek Township is a township in Jasper County, Iowa, United States.

== History ==
Rock Creek Township was established in 1857.
