= Valeria, Iowa =

- City
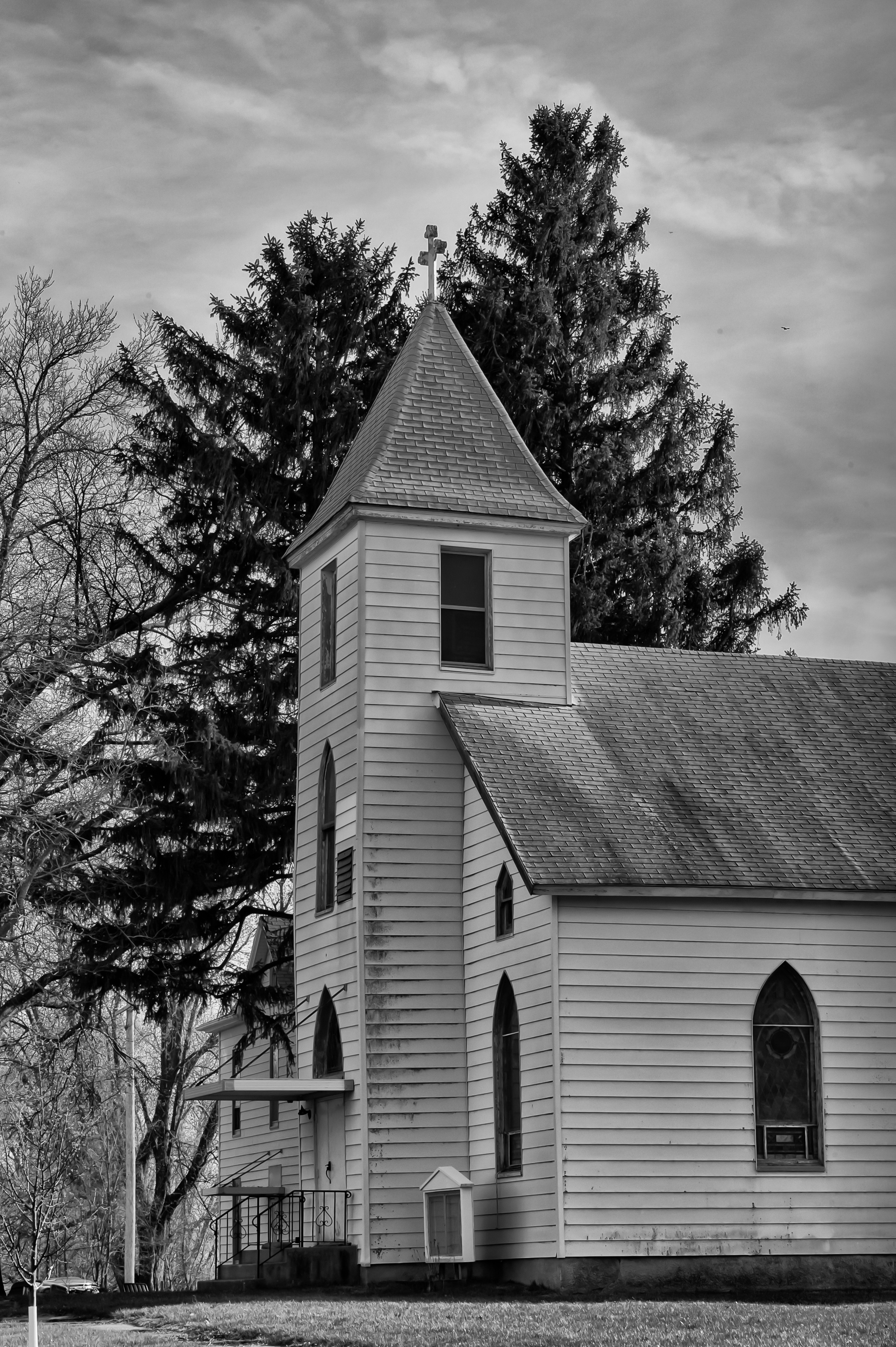
- Sacred Heart Church

- Location of Valeria, Iowa
- Coordinates: 41°43′50″N 93°19′29″W
- Country: United States
- State: Iowa
- County: Jasper

Area
  - Total: 0.050 sq mi (0.13 km^{2})
  - Land: 0.050 sq mi (0.13 km^{2})
  - Water: 0 sq mi (0.00 km^{2})
- Elevation: 876 ft (267 m)

Population (2020)
  - Total: 39
  - Density: 792.4/sq mi (305.95/km^{2})
- Time zone: UTC-6 (Central (CST))
  - Summer (DST): UTC-5 (CDT)
- ZIP code: 50054
- Area code: 515
- FIPS code: 19-80175
- GNIS feature ID: 0462514

Valeria is a city in Jasper County, Iowa, United States. The population was 39 at the time of the 2020 census.

== History ==
Valeria got its start in the year 1883, following construction of the Chicago Great Western Railway through the territory. Valeria's population was estimated at 100 residents in 1887, was 146 in 1902, and was 92 in 1915.

== Geography ==
Valeria's longitude and latitude coordinates in decimal form are 41.730538, -93.324695.

According to the United States Census Bureau, the city has a total area of 0.05 square miles (0.13 km^{2}), all land.

== Demographics ==
Historical populations
Year	Pop.	±%
1920	70	—
1930	57	−18.6%
1940	79	+38.6%
1950	57	−27.8%
1960	76	+33.3%
1970	96	+26.3%
1980	80	−16.7%
1990	69	−13.7%
2000	62	−10.1%
2010	57	−8.1%
2020	39	−31.6%
Source:"U.S. Census website". United States Census Bureau. and Iowa Data Center; Source: U.S. Decennial Census

=== 2020 census ===
As of the census of 2020, there were 39 people, 15 households, and 10 families residing in the city. The population density was 792.4 inhabitants per square mile (306.0/km^{2}). There were 22 housing units at an average density of 447.0 per square mile (172.6/km^{2}). The racial makeup of the city was 92.3% White, 0.0% Black or African American, 0.0% Native American, 5.1% Asian, 0.0% Pacific Islander, 0.0% from other races and 2.6% from two or more races. Hispanic or Latino persons of any race comprised 2.6% of the population.

Of the 15 households, 33.3% of which had children under the age of 18 living with them, 53.3% were married couples living together, 6.7% were cohabitating couples, 20.0% had a female householder with no spouse or partner present and 20.0% had a male householder with no spouse or partner present. 33.3% of all households were non-families. 20.0% of all households were made up of individuals, 13.3% had someone living alone who was 65 years old or older.

The median age in the city was 47.3 years. 15.4% of the residents were under the age of 20; 2.6% were between the ages of 20 and 24; 17.9% were from 25 and 44; 51.3% were from 45 and 64; and 12.8% were 65 years of age or older. The gender makeup of the city was 51.3% male and 48.7% female.

=== 2010 census ===
As of the census of 2010, there were 57 people, 22 households, and 14 families living in the city. The population density was 1,140.0 inhabitants per square mile (440.2/km^{2}). There were 26 housing units at an average density of 520.0 units per square mile (200.8 units/km^{2}). The racial makeup of the city was 96.5% White and 3.5% African American.

There were 22 households, of which 22.7% had children under the age of 18 living with them, 54.5% were married couples living together, 9.1% had a female householder with no husband present, and 36.4% were non-families. 27.3% of all households were made up of individuals. The average household size was 2.59 and the average family size was 3.29.

The median age in the city was 43.5 years. 26.3% of residents were under the age of 18; 3.6% were between the ages of 18 and 24; 22.9% were from 25 to 44; 28.1% were from 45 to 64; and 19.3% were 65 years of age or older. The gender makeup of the city was 56.1% male and 43.9% female.

=== 2000 census ===
As of the census of 2000, there were 62 people, 24 households, and 19 families living in the city. The population density was 1,394.9 inhabitants per square mile (538.6/km^{2}). There were 28 housing units at an average density of 629.9 units per square mile (243.2 units/km^{2}). The racial makeup of the city was 98.39% White, and 1.61% from two or more races.

There were 24 households, out of which 33.3% had children under the age of 18 living with them, 66.7% were married couples living together, and 20.8% were non-families. 16.7% of all households were made up of individuals, and 4.2% had someone living alone who was 65 years of age or older. The average household size was 2.58 and the average family size was 2.95.

In the city, the population was spread out, with 25.8% under the age of 18, 3.2% from 18 to 24, 37.1% from 25 to 44, 29.0% from 45 to 64, and 4.8% who were 65 years of age or older. The median age was 37 years. For every 100 females, there were 121.4 males. For every 100 females age 18 and over, there were 109.1 males.

The median income for a household in the city was $35,938, and the median income for a family was $43,750. Males had a median income of $30,625 versus $23,333 for females. The per capita income for the city was $18,365. There were no families and 1.7% of the population living below the poverty line, including no under eighteens and none of those over 64.

== Education ==
Colfax–Mingo Community School District operates area public schools. The Colfax and Mingo school districts consolidated on July 1, 1985.
