= Elk Creek Township, Jasper County, Iowa =

Township in Jasper County, Iowa

Coordinates: 41.5533°N 92.9308°W

Elk Creek
- Township
- Elk Creek Township
- Interactive map of Elk Creek
- Jasper County: Iowa
- First settled: March 1845

Population (2020)
  - Total: 434
- Time zone: UTC-6 (Central Standard Time)
  - Summer (DST): -5
- Postal codes: 50170, 50231, 50232
- Area code: 641

Elk Creek Township is a township in Jasper County, Iowa, United States.

== History ==
Elk Creek Township was established in 1846.
