= Poweshiek Township, Jasper County, Iowa =

Township in Jasper County, Iowa

Coordinates: 41.7375°N 93.2750°W

Poweshiek Township is a township in Jasper County, Iowa, United States.

== History ==
Poweshiek Township was established in 1847. It is named for Chief Poweshiek of the Meskwaki people.
