= Mound Prairie Township, Jasper County, Iowa =

Township in Jasper County, Iowa

Coordinates: 41.6500°N 93.1764°W

Mound Prairie Township is a township in Jasper County, Iowa, United States.

== History ==
Mound Prairie Township was established in 1857.
