= Buena Vista Township, Jasper County, Iowa =

Township in Jasper County, Iowa

Buena Vista Township
- Township
- Interactive map of Buena Vista Township
- Coordinates: 41.6497°N 92.9514°W
- Country: United States
- State: Iowa
- County: Jasper County
- Established: 1857

Buena Vista Township is a township in Jasper County, Iowa, United States.

== History ==
Buena Vista Township was established in 1857.
