= Vandalia, Iowa =

- Unincorporated community
- Location within Iowa
- Coordinates: 41°32′22″N 93°18′22″W
- Country: United States
- State: Iowa
- County: Jasper
- Elevation: 906 ft (276 m)
- Time zone: UTC-6 (Central (CST))
  - Summer (DST): UTC-5 (CDT)
- GNIS feature ID: 462542

Vandalia is an unincorporated community in Jasper County, in the U.S. state of Iowa.

== Geography ==
The community is located at 41°32′22″N 93°18′22″W, five miles north of Runnells, Iowa, and 22 miles southwest of Newton, Iowa, the Jasper County seat.

== History ==
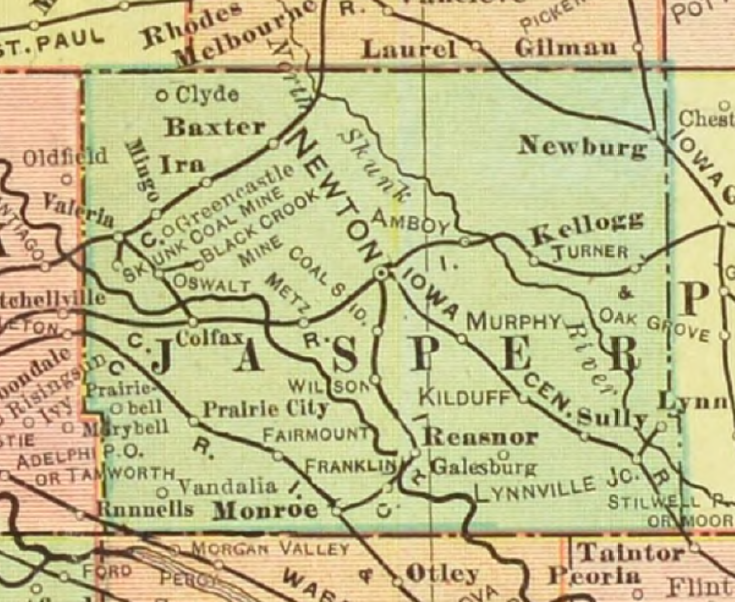
Vandalia in southwestern Jasper County, Iowa, 1902

In 1850, John Q. Deakin built a flour mill and carding factory where Vandalia is now located.

Vandalia was platted in either 1851 or 1853 in Section 20 of Des Moines Township, Jasper County, Iowa. During the 1860s, the village prospered.

The first building erected after the founding was a store, followed by a Baptist church, a schoolhouse in 1856, another mill, two hotels, three more general stores, a plow factory and two wagon shops. By 1865, Vandalia had nearly 400 residents. The Des Moines Valley Railroad met with community leaders to discuss the possibility of a rail line connecting Vandalia, but this did not occur. Businesses left Vandalia in favor of railroad towns.

In the early 1900s, Vandalia was home to J.L. Cavett's general store.

The population of Vandalia was 301 in 1902, and 310 in 1925.

Vandalia's population was 20 in 1940.

== See also ==
- Green Castle, Iowa
