= Kellogg Township, Jasper County, Iowa =

Township in Jasper County, Iowa

Coordinates: 41.7306°N 92.9369°W

Kellogg Township is a township in Jasper County, Iowa, United States.

== History ==
Kellogg Township was organized in 1868.
