= Hickory Grove Township, Jasper County, Iowa =

Township in Jasper County, Iowa

Coordinates: 41.8103°N 92.8294°W

Hickory Grove Township is a township in Jasper County, Iowa, United States.

== History ==
Independence Township was established in 1864.
