= Hickory Grove Township, Warren County, Missouri =

Inactive township in the US state of Missouri

Coordinates: 38.7829770°N 91.0182818°W

Hickory Grove Township is an inactive township in Warren County, in the U.S. state of Missouri.

Hickory Grove Township was erected in 1839, taking its name from the extinct community of the same name within its borders.
