= Lambs Grove, Iowa =

- City
- Location of Lambs Grove, Iowa
- Coordinates: 41°42′4″N 93°4′42″W
- Country: United States
- State: Iowa
- County: Jasper

Area
  - Total: 0.10 sq mi (0.26 km^{2})
  - Land: 0.10 sq mi (0.26 km^{2})
  - Water: 0 sq mi (0.00 km^{2})
- Elevation: 920 ft (280 m)

Population (2020)
  - Total: 174
  - Density: 1,707.8/sq mi (659.37/km^{2})
- Time zone: UTC-6 (Central (CST))
  - Summer (DST): UTC-5 (CDT)
- ZIP code: 50208
- Area code: 641
- FIPS code: 19-42870
- GNIS feature ID: 0458212
- Website: www.lambsgrove.us

Lambs Grove is a city in Jasper County, Iowa, United States. The population was 174 as of the 2020 Census, down from 225 recorded in 2000.

== Geography ==
Lambs Grove is located at 41°42′4″N 93°4′42″W (41.701199, -93.078282).

According to the United States Census Bureau, the city has a total area of 0.10 square miles (0.26 km^{2}), all land. There is a small creek that flows through Lambs Grove. Hat Rock Park is located near the center of the town.

== History ==
Lambs Grove was founded in 1927 by E. C. and Jennie Ogg and named after Richard Lamb, Jennie Ogg's father. It was incorporated on December 29, 1952.

On March 5, 2022, an EF4 tornado struck the town, although it was much weaker than it was earlier in its lifetime, damaging multiple homes and facilities.

== Demographics ==
Historical populations
Year	Pop.	±%
1960	234	—
1970	239	+2.1%
1980	228	−4.6%
1990	212	−7.0%
2000	225	+6.1%
2010	172	−23.6%
2020	174	+1.2%
Source:"U.S. Census website". United States Census Bureau. and Iowa Data Center; Source: U.S. Decennial Census

=== 2020 census ===
As of the census of 2020, there were 174 people, 73 households, and 56 families residing in the city. The population density was 1,702.6 inhabitants per square mile (657.4/km^{2}). There were 79 housing units at an average density of 773.0 per square mile (298.5/km^{2}). The racial makeup of the city was 94.8% White, 1.1% Black or African American, 0.6% Native American, 0.0% Asian, 0.0% Pacific Islander, 1.1% from other races and 2.3% from two or more races. Hispanic or Latino persons of any race comprised 6.3% of the population.

Of the 73 households, 35.6% of which had children under the age of 18 living with them, 58.9% were married couples living together, 9.6% were cohabitating couples, 15.1% had a female householder with no spouse or partner present and 16.4% had a male householder with no spouse or partner present. 23.3% of all households were non-families. 17.8% of all households were made up of individuals, 6.8% had someone living alone who was 65 years old or older.

The median age in the city was 49.6 years. 20.1% of the residents were under the age of 20; 1.1% were between the ages of 20 and 24; 22.4% were from 25 and 44; 32.8% were from 45 and 64; and 23.6% were 65 years of age or older. The gender makeup of the city was 50.0% male and 50.0% female.

=== 2010 census ===
As of the census of 2010, there were 172 people, 73 households, and 52 families residing in the city. The population density was 1,720.0 inhabitants per square mile (664.1/km^{2}). There were 80 housing units at an average density of 800.0 units per square mile (308.9 units/km^{2}). The racial makeup of the city was 95.9% White, 2.9% from other races, and 1.2% from two or more races. Hispanic or Latino of any race were 2.9% of the population.

There were 73 households, of which 24.7% had children under the age of 18 living with them, 61.6% were married couples living together, 6.8% had a female householder with no husband present, 2.7% had a male householder with no wife present, and 28.8% were non-families. 26.0% of all households were made up of individuals, and 15.1% had someone living alone who was 65 years of age or older. The average household size was 2.36 and the average family size was 2.87.

The median age in the city was 47.5 years. 20.3% of residents were under the age of 18; 5.3% were between the ages of 18 and 24; 21% were from 25 to 44; 33.1% were from 45 to 64; and 20.3% were 65 years of age or older. The gender makeup of the city was 48.8% male and 51.2% female.

=== 2000 census ===
As of the census of 2000, there were 225 people, 80 households, and 68 families residing in the city. The population density was 2,220.2 inhabitants per square mile (857.2/km^{2}). There were 80 housing units at an average density of 789.4 units per square mile (304.8 units/km^{2}). The racial makeup of the city was 97.78% White and 2.22% Asian. Hispanic or Latino of any race were 0.44% of the population.

There were 80 households, out of which 40.0% had children under the age of 18 living with them, 73.8% were married couples living together, 7.5% had a female householder with no husband present, and 15.0% were non-families. 12.5% of all households were made up of individuals, and 3.8% had someone living alone who was 65 years of age or older. The average household size was 2.81 and the average family size was 3.06.

In the city, the population was spread out, with 26.2% under the age of 18, 8.4% from 18 to 24, 23.1% from 25 to 44, 30.2% from 45 to 64, and 12.0% who were 65 years of age or older. The median age was 41 years. For every 100 females, there were 97.4 males. For every 100 females age 18 and over, there were 88.6 males.

The median income for a household in the city was $56,000, and the median income for a family was $65,417. Males had a median income of $45,000 versus $28,750 for females. The per capita income for the city was $20,923. About 6.2% of families and 5.6% of the population were below the poverty line, including 12.0% of those under the age of eighteen and none of those 65 or over.
