= Independence Township, Jasper County, Iowa =

Township in Jasper County, Iowa

Coordinates: 41.8128°N 93.1769°W

Independence Township is a township in Jasper County, Iowa, United States.

== History ==
Independence Township was established in 1858.
