= Taylor Township, Marshall County, Iowa =

Township in Marshall County, Iowa, U.S.

Coordinates: 42.079°N 92.942°W

Taylor Township is a township in Marshall County, Iowa, USA.

== History ==
Taylor Township was created in 1871.
