= Mariposa Township, Jasper County, Iowa =

Township in Jasper County, Iowa

Coordinates: 41.819°N 92.942°W

Mariposa Township is a township in Jasper County, Iowa, United States.

== History ==
Mariposa Township was established in 1857.
