= Clear Creek Township, Jasper County, Iowa =

Township in Jasper County, Iowa, US

Clear Creek Township
- Township
- Interactive map of Clear Creek Township
- Coordinates: 41.84°N 93.28°W
- Country: United States
- State: Iowa
- County: Jasper County
- Established: 1849

Area
  - Total: 35.7 sq mi (92 km^{2})
  - Land: 35.7 sq mi (92 km^{2})
  - Water: 0.0 sq mi (0 km^{2}) 0%

Population (2000)
  - Total: 356
  - Density: 9.97/sq mi (3.85/km^{2})

Clear Creek Township is located in the far northwest corner of Jasper County, Iowa, United States. It contains the Clear Creek Wildlife Area.

== History ==
Clear Creek Township was established in 1849.

== Geography ==
The township has a land area of 35.7 square miles (92 km^{2}) and a water area of 0 square miles (0 km^{2}).

== Demographics ==
=== Population ===
As of the 2000 census, Clear Creek Township had a population of 356 (all rural), made up of 175 males (49.2%) and 181 females (50.8%).

The median age of males was 43.1, whilst the median age of females was 42.9.

Races in Clear Creek township:

- White non-Hispanic: 99.4%
- Asian: 0.3%
- Two or more races: 0.3%

=== Housing ===
356 houses were occupied houses or apartments, with 288 (80.9%) owner occupied and 68 (19.1%) renter occupied.

70% of residents in Clear Creek Township had lived in the same house 5 years ago. Out of people who lived in different houses, 50% lived in the county. Out of people who lived in different counties, 77% lived in Iowa.
