= Mingo, Iowa =

- City
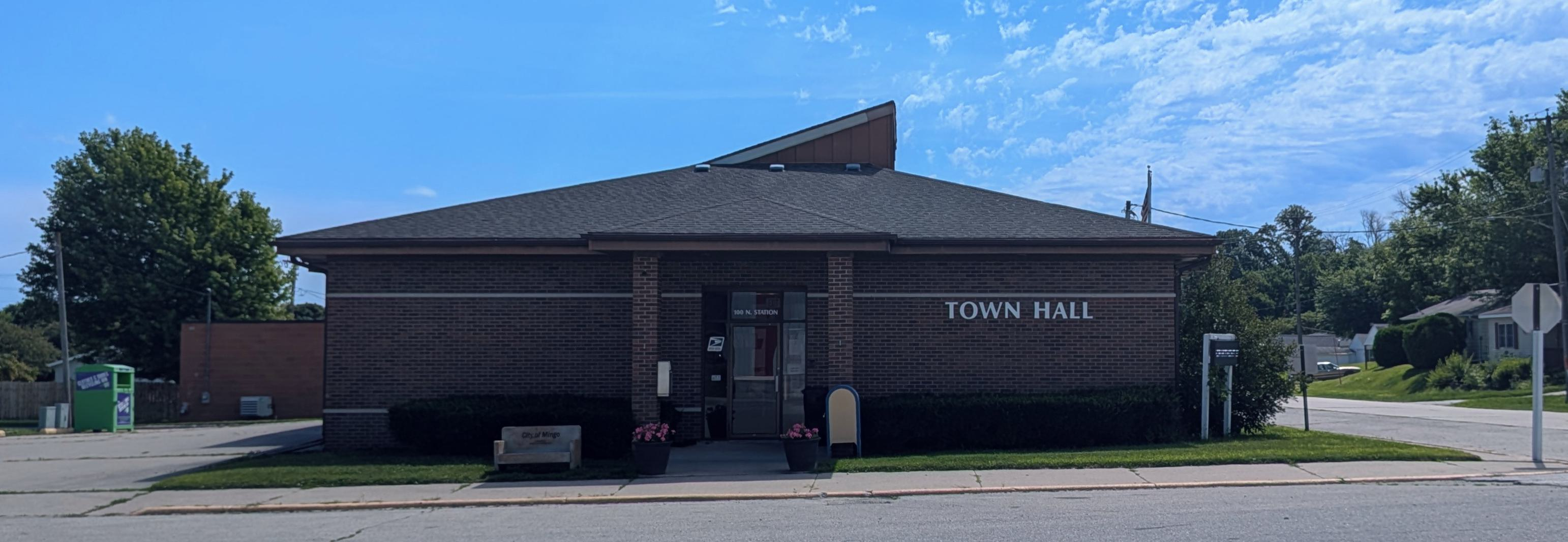
- Mingo Town Hall

- Location of Mingo, Iowa
- Coordinates: 41°46′4″N 93°17′2″W
- Country: United States
- State: Iowa
- County: Jasper

Area
  - Total: 0.62 sq mi (1.60 km^{2})
  - Land: 0.62 sq mi (1.60 km^{2})
  - Water: 0 sq mi (0.00 km^{2})
- Elevation: 837 ft (255 m)

Population (2020)
  - Total: 302
  - Density: 490.2/sq mi (189.27/km^{2})
- Time zone: UTC-6 (Central (CST))
  - Summer (DST): UTC-5 (CDT)
- ZIP code: 50168
- Area code: 641
- FIPS code: 19-52815
- GNIS feature ID: 0459132

Mingo is a city in Jasper County, Iowa, United States. The population was 302 at the time of the 2020 census.

== History ==
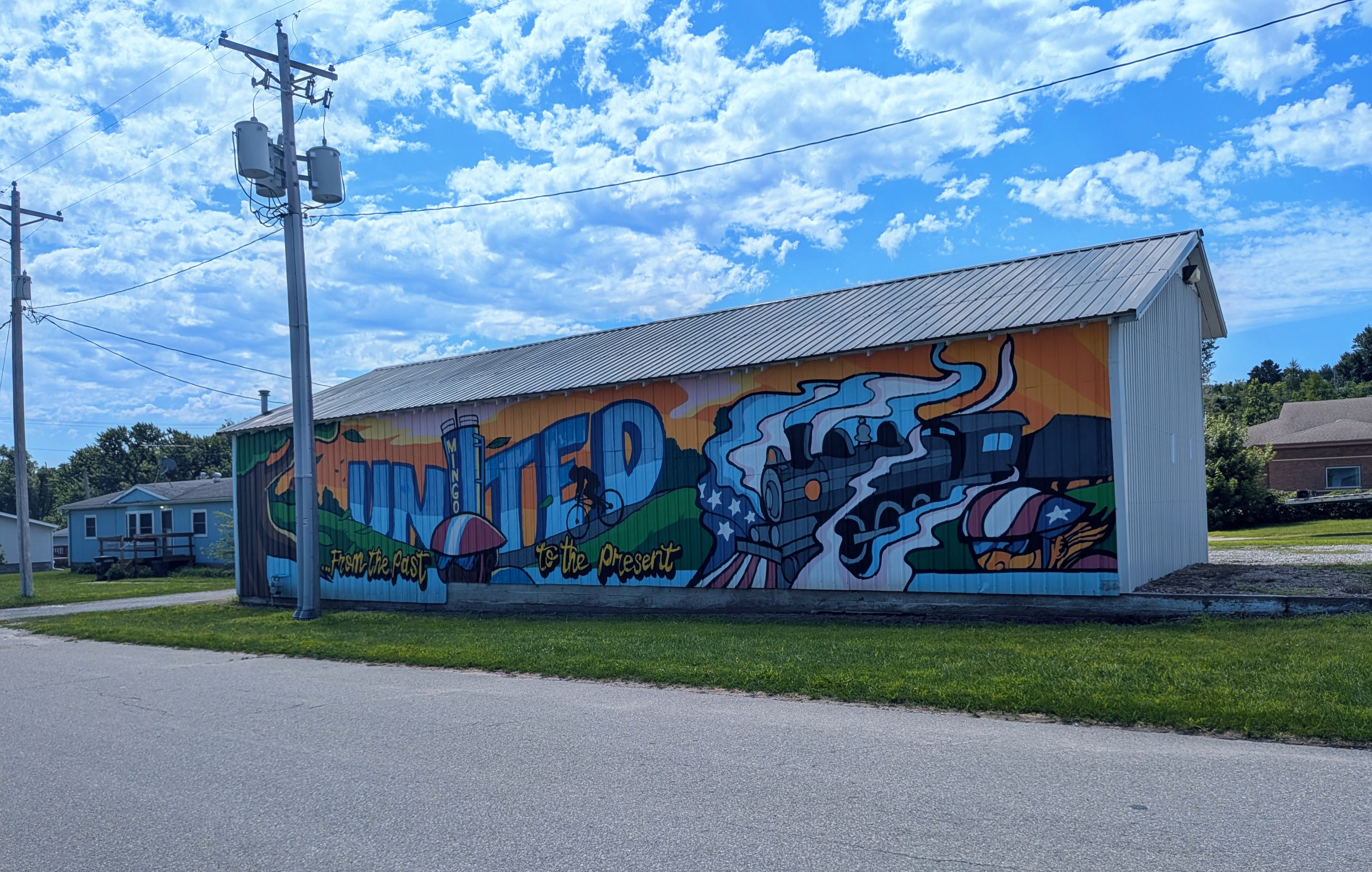
A mural in Mingo celebrating the railroad heritage

Mingo was platted in 1884. It is named from Mingo, Ohio, a city name derived from the historic Iroquoian Mingo people.

The city was originally established as a coal mining community, along with many of its neighboring communities.

== Geography ==
Mingo is located at 41°46′4″N 93°17′2″W (41.767764, -93.283772).

According to the United States Census Bureau, the city has a total area of 0.61 square miles (1.58 km^{2}), all land.

== Demographics ==
Historical populations
| Year | Pop. | ±% |
|---|---|---|
| 1910 | 246 | — |
| 1920 | 324 | +31.7% |
| 1930 | 313 | −3.4% |
| 1940 | 290 | −7.3% |
| 1950 | 227 | −21.7% |
| 1960 | 260 | +14.5% |
| 1970 | 260 | +0.0% |
| 1980 | 303 | +16.5% |
| 1990 | 252 | −16.8% |
| 2000 | 269 | +6.7% |
| 2010 | 302 | +12.3% |
| 2020 | 302 | +0.0% |
Source:"U.S. Census website". United States Census Bureau. and Iowa Data Center; Source: U.S. Decennial Census

=== 2020 census ===
As of the census of 2020, there were 302 people, 124 households, and 80 families residing in the city. The population density was 490.2 inhabitants per square mile (189.3/km^{2}). There were 133 housing units at an average density of 215.9 per square mile (83.4/km^{2}). The racial makeup of the city was 91.1% White, 1.7% Black or African American, 0.3% Native American, 0.3% Asian, 0.0% Pacific Islander, 1.7% from other races and 5.0% from two or more races. Hispanic or Latino persons of any race comprised 0.3% of the population.

Of the 124 households, 37.1% of which had children under the age of 18 living with them, 49.2% were married couples living together, 5.6% were cohabitating couples, 25.0% had a female householder with no spouse or partner present and 20.2% had a male householder with no spouse or partner present. 35.5% of all households were non-families. 31.5% of all households were made up of individuals, 9.7% had someone living alone who was 65 years old or older.

The median age in the city was 37.5 years. 26.2% of the residents were under the age of 20; 5.3% were between the ages of 20 and 24; 29.1% were from 25 and 44; 25.8% were from 45 and 64; and 13.6% were 65 years of age or older. The gender makeup of the city was 47.7% male and 52.3% female.

=== 2010 census ===
As of the census of 2010, there were 302 people, 120 households, and 89 families living in the city. The population density was 495.1 inhabitants per square mile (191.2/km^{2}). There were 134 housing units at an average density of 219.7 per square mile (84.8/km^{2}). The racial makeup of the city was 97.7% White, 0.7% African American, and 1.7% from two or more races. Hispanic or Latino of any race were 1.0% of the population.

There were 120 households, of which 36.7% had children under the age of 18 living with them, 55.0% were married couples living together, 15.0% had a female householder with no husband present, 4.2% had a male householder with no wife present, and 25.8% were non-families. 23.3% of all households were made up of individuals, and 10% had someone living alone who was 65 years of age or older. The average household size was 2.52 and the average family size was 2.85.

The median age in the city was 36.3 years. 26.8% of residents were under the age of 18; 6.6% were between the ages of 18 and 24; 24.8% were from 25 to 44; 24.7% were from 45 to 64; and 16.9% were 65 years of age or older. The gender makeup of the city was 46.0% male and 54.0% female.

=== 2000 census ===
As of the census of 2000, there were 269 people, 107 households, and 78 families living in the city. The population density was 544.9 inhabitants per square mile (210.4/km^{2}). There were 113 housing units at an average density of 228.9 per square mile (88.4/km^{2}). The racial makeup of the city was 98.88% White, and 1.12% from two or more races. Hispanic or Latino of any race were 1.86% of the population.

There were 107 households, out of which 32.7% had children under the age of 18 living with them, 62.6% were married couples living together, 3.7% had a female householder with no husband present, and 26.2% were non-families. 24.3% of all households were made up of individuals, and 8.4% had someone living alone who was 65 years of age or older. The average household size was 2.51 and the average family size was 2.99.

In the city, the population was spread out, with 24.2% under the age of 18, 10.4% from 18 to 24, 26.0% from 25 to 44, 27.1% from 45 to 64, and 12.3% who were 65 years of age or older. The median age was 40 years. For every 100 females, there were 102.3 males. For every 100 females age 18 and over, there were 106.1 males.

The median income for a household in the city was $40,341, and the median income for a family was $44,000. Males had a median income of $31,250 versus $20,833 for females. The per capita income for the city was $18,834. About 1.3% of families and 3.9% of the population were below the poverty line, including none of those under the age of eighteen and 10.8% of those 65 or over.

== Education ==
Colfax–Mingo Community School District operates area public schools. The Colfax and Mingo school districts consolidated on July 1, 1985.

== Notable person ==
- Alice Bellvadore Sams Turner (1859–1915), physician, writer
- Carolyn Hunt (born 1937), First Lady of North Carolina
