= Colfax, Iowa =

City in Iowa, US

- City
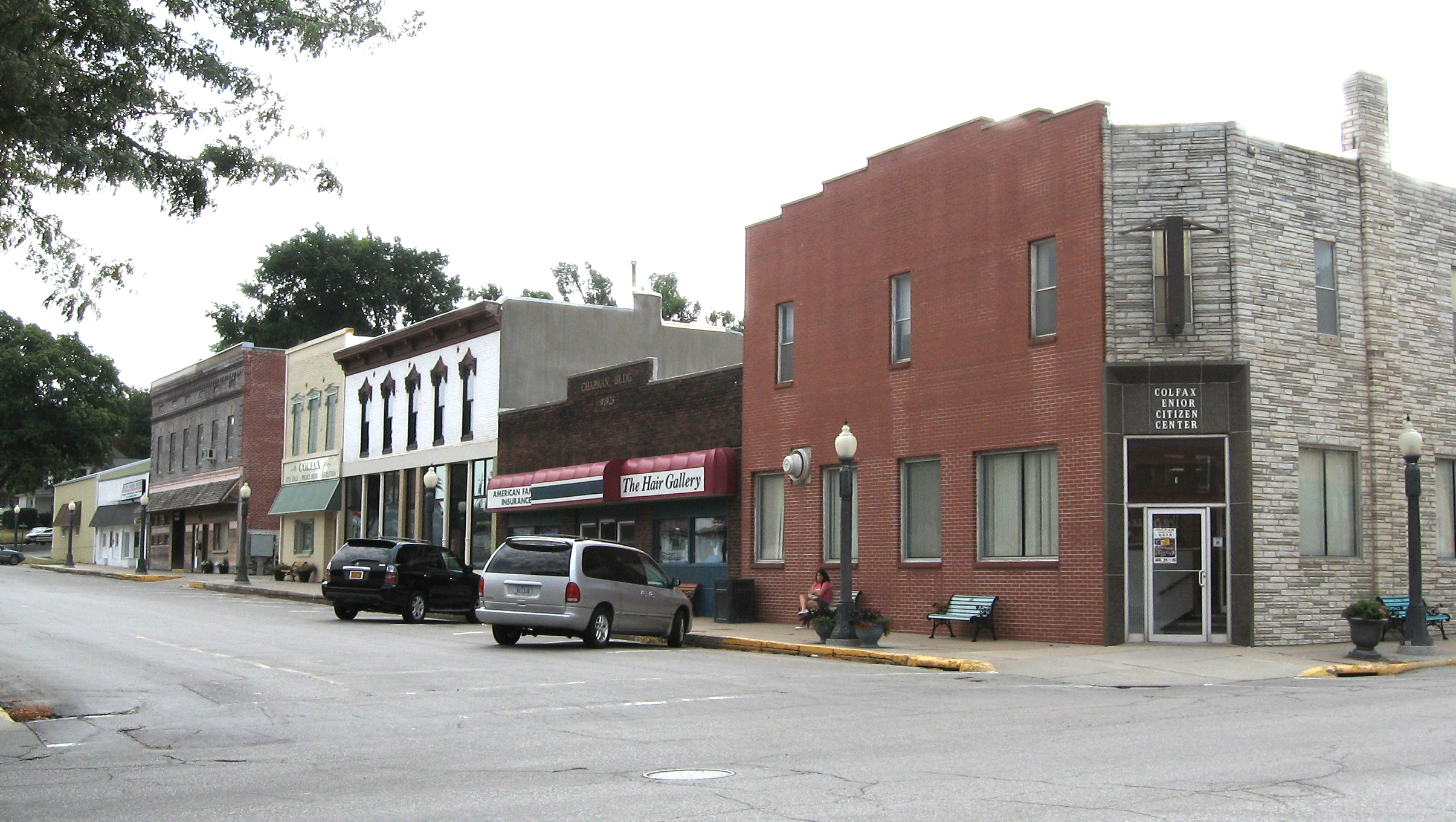
- Downtown Colfax, Iowa

- Flag

- Location of Colfax, Iowa
- Coordinates: 41°40′33″N 93°14′40″W
- Country: USA
- State: Iowa
- County: Jasper
- Incorporated: August 10, 1875

Area
  - Total: 2.64 sq mi (6.84 km^{2})
  - Land: 2.41 sq mi (6.25 km^{2})
  - Water: 0.23 sq mi (0.59 km^{2})
- Elevation: 801 ft (244 m)

Population (2020)
  - Total: 2,255
  - Density: 933.9/sq mi (360.59/km^{2})
- Time zone: UTC-6 (Central (CST))
  - Summer (DST): UTC-5 (CDT)
- ZIP code: 50054
- Area code: 515
- FIPS code: 19-15060
- GNIS feature ID: 0455527
- Website: colfaxia.gov

Colfax is a city in Jasper County, Iowa, United States. Colfax is located approximately 24 miles east of Des Moines. The town was founded in 1866, and was named after Schuyler Colfax, vice president under Ulysses S. Grant. The population was 2,255 at the time of the 2020 census. Newton is the county seat; both were named after Revolutionary War soldiers.

== History ==
Colfax was laid out in 1866. It is named for Schuyler Colfax.

In its heyday, the city of Colfax had two main industries that drew thousands to the area: the mining of coal, and the use of the mineral springs discovered near the city.

The first large scale coal mine in Jasper County was the Watson No. 1 Mine, 5 miles southeast of town, connected to the Rock Island by a long railroad spur. From 1881 to 1900, the Jasper County Coal and Railway Company operated a number of mines north of Colfax. The Colfax Consolidated Coal Company formed in 1902, bringing the mines of Colfax under a common operator. They opened mine No. 8 in 1905; this was one of the best equipped mines in the state. The coal camp of Severs was run by this company.

United Mine Workers local 56 was organized in Colfax in 1899; by 1907, it had 352 members. Mine wages varied from $2.36 to $2.56 per day. In 1912, the UMW union had two locals based in Colfax, Local 56, with 350 members, and Local 671, with 230 members.

In the process of drilling for coal in 1875, a well containing high mineral content was discovered near Colfax. The city flourished with this new discovery, and over the next four decades, thousands of people visited the town to partake in the healing powers of the fourteen mineral springs there. Nine hotels offering mineral baths and spa treatments opened to house guests, and four bottling companies opened to produce bottled mineral water for the masses. In 1912–1913, the city received funding to build a Carnegie library. The library is still in use today. The booming business of the city's mineral springs industry declined and died out as the Great Depression swept the country.

== Geography ==
According to the United States Census Bureau, the city has a total area of 1.80 square miles (4.66 km^{2}), of which 1.79 square miles (4.64 km^{2}) is land and 0.01 square miles (0.03 km^{2}) is water.

== Demographics ==
Historical populations
Year	Pop.	±%
1880	620	—
1890	957	+54.4%
1900	2,053	+114.5%
1910	2,524	+22.9%
1920	2,504	−0.8%
1930	2,213	−11.6%
1940	2,222	+0.4%
1950	2,279	+2.6%
1960	2,331	+2.3%
1970	2,293	−1.6%
1980	2,234	−2.6%
1990	2,462	+10.2%
2000	2,223	−9.7%
2010	2,093	−5.8%
2020	2,255	+7.7%
Source:"U.S. Census website". United States Census Bureau. and Iowa Data Center; Source: U.S. Decennial Census

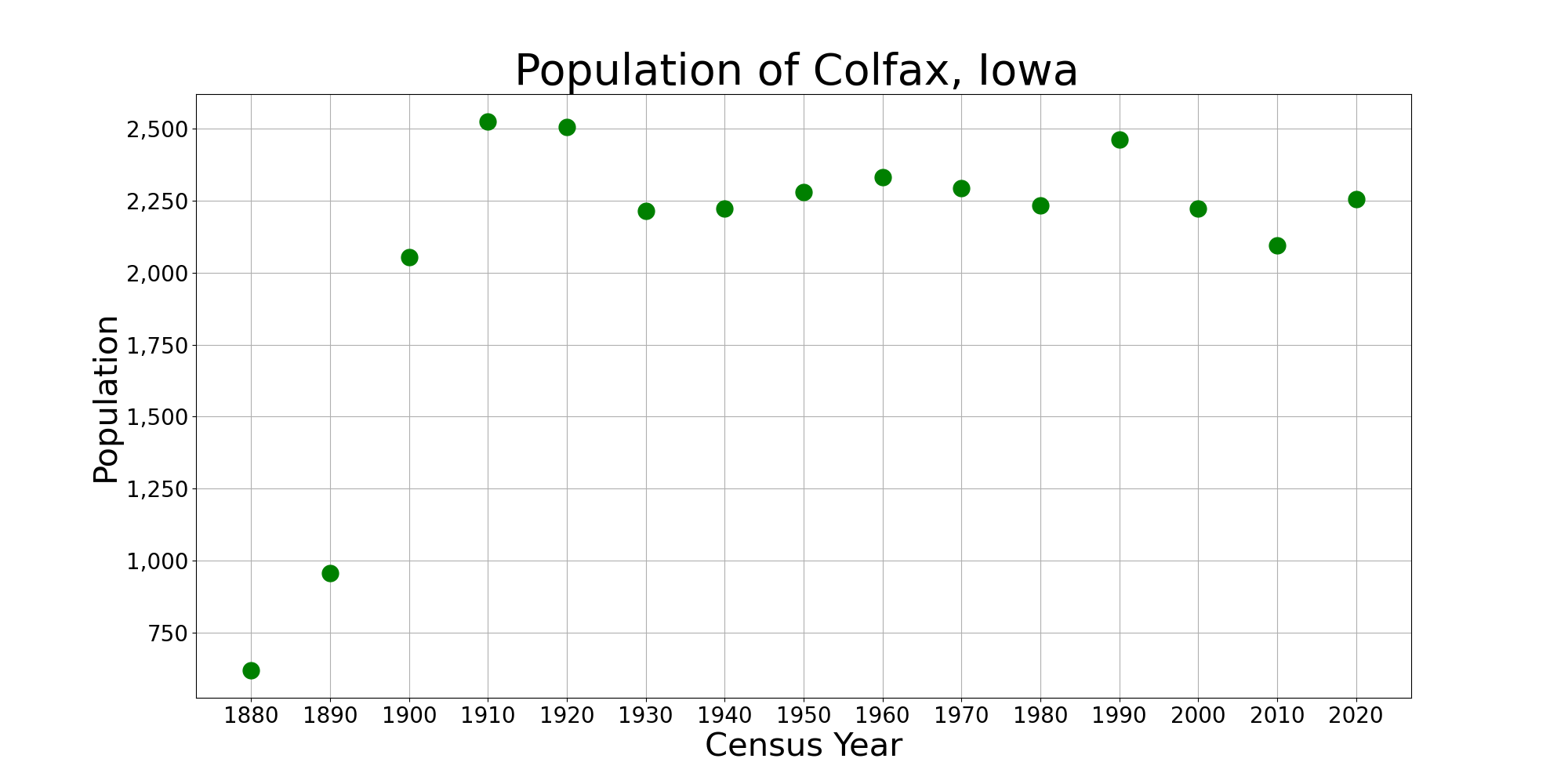
The population of Colfax, Iowa from US census data

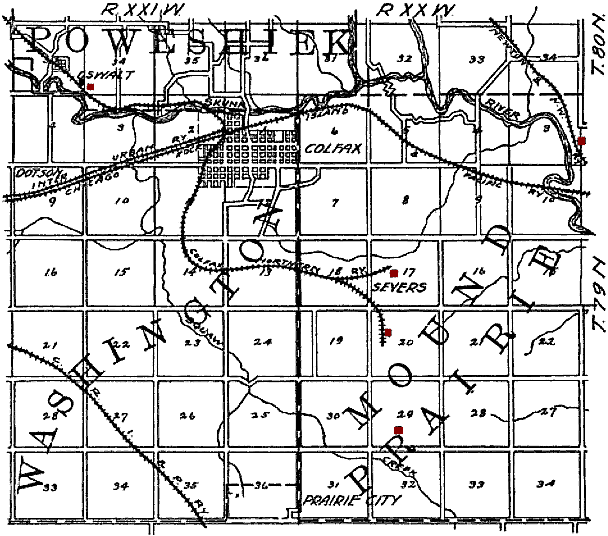
Map of Colfax from 1908, showing the railroads and coal mines (shown in red) of the region.

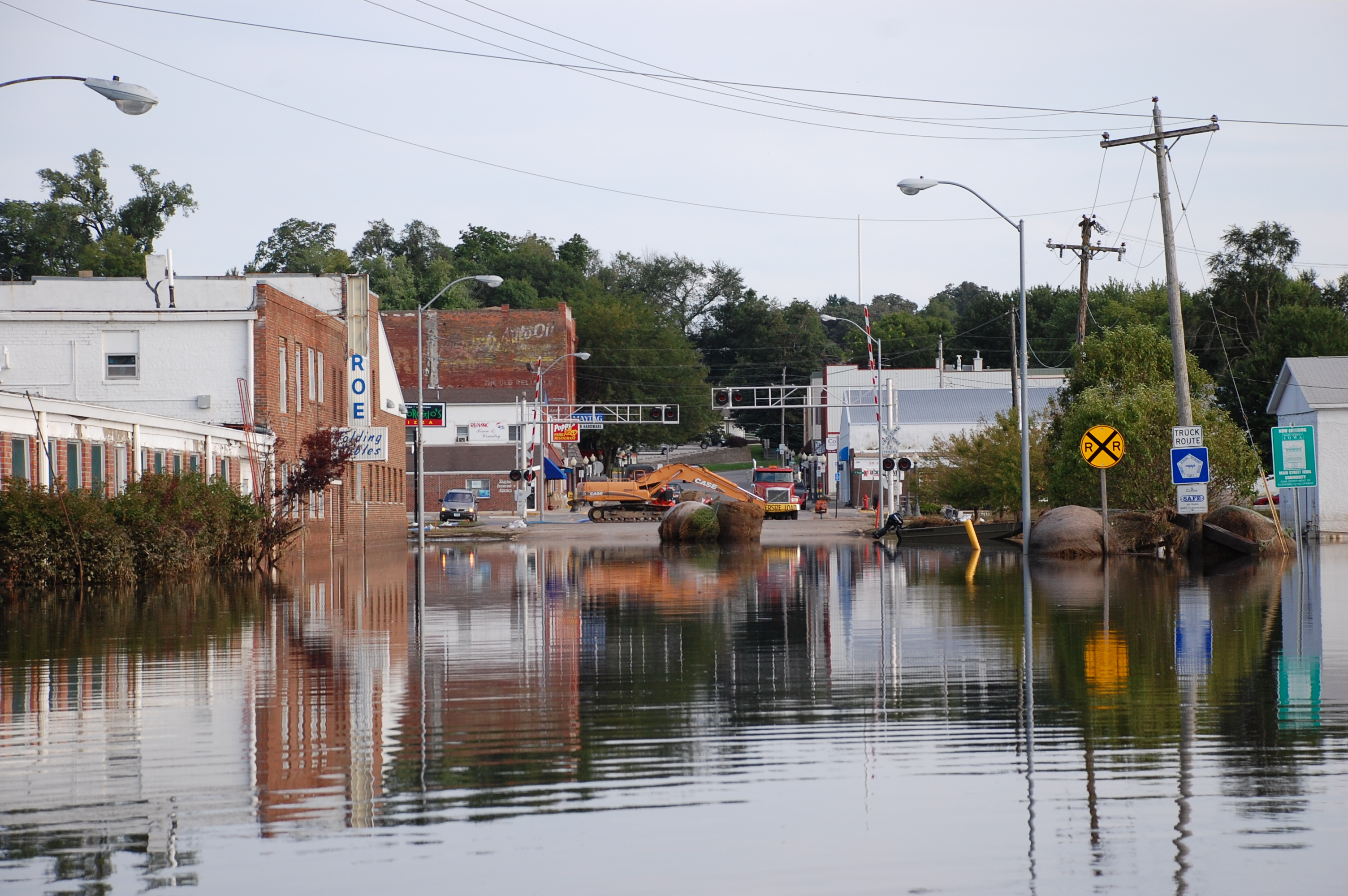
Part of downtown Colfax was flooded in 2010.

=== 2020 census ===
As of the 2020 census, there were 2,255 people, 874 households, and 551 families residing in the city. The population density was 933.9 inhabitants per square mile (360.6/km^{2}). There were 947 housing units at an average density of 392.2 per square mile (151.4/km^{2}).

The median age in the city was 39.2 years. 24.2% of residents were under the age of 18 and 14.0% were 65 years of age or older. 26.9% of residents were under the age of 20; 4.8% were between the ages of 20 and 24; 26.9% were from 25 to 44; and 27.5% were from 45 to 64. For every 100 females there were 103.3 males, and for every 100 females age 18 and over there were 101.5 males age 18 and over.

Of the 874 households, 30.9% had children under the age of 18 living with them. Of all households, 44.2% were married-couple households, 23.6% were households with a male householder and no spouse or partner present, and 24.4% were households with a female householder and no spouse or partner present. 37.0% of households were non-families. About 29.8% of all households were made up of individuals, and 12.1% had someone living alone who was 65 years of age or older.

There were 947 housing units, of which 7.7% were vacant. The homeowner vacancy rate was 2.4% and the rental vacancy rate was 7.6%. 0.0% of residents lived in urban areas, while 100.0% lived in rural areas.

Racial composition as of the 2020 census
Race	Number	Percent
White	2,076	92.1%
Black or African American	13	0.6%
American Indian and Alaska Native	1	0.0%
Asian	13	0.6%
Native Hawaiian and Other Pacific Islander	11	0.5%
Some other race	39	1.7%
Two or more races	102	4.5%
Hispanic or Latino (of any race)	63	2.8%

=== 2010 census ===
As of the census of 2010, there were 2,093 people, 851 households, and 569 families residing in the city. The population density was 1,169.3 inhabitants per square mile (451.5/km^{2}). There were 927 housing units at an average density of 517.9 per square mile (200.0/km^{2}). The racial makeup of the city was 98.3% White, 0.3% African American, 0.4% Native American, 0.1% Asian, 0.1% from other races, and 0.7% from two or more races. Hispanic or Latino of any race were 0.9% of the population.

There were 851 households, of which 32.8% had children under the age of 18 living with them, 49.4% were married couples living together, 12.3% had a female householder with no husband present, 5.2% had a male householder with no wife present, and 33.1% were non-families. 27.7% of all households were made up of individuals, and 13.5% had someone living alone who was 65 years of age or older. The average household size was 2.42 and the average family size was 2.95.

The median age in the city was 38.3 years. 25% of residents were under the age of 18; 6.8% were between the ages of 18 and 24; 26.1% were from 25 to 44; 27.1% were from 45 to 64; and 14.8% were 65 years of age or older. The gender makeup of the city was 49.2% male and 50.8% female.

=== 2000 census ===
As of the census of 2000, there were 2,223 people, 837 households, and 585 families residing in the city. The population density was 1,632.4 inhabitants per square mile (630.3/km^{2}). There were 908 housing units at an average density of 666.8 per square mile (257.5/km^{2}). The racial makeup of the city was 98.25% White, 0.49% African American, 0.22% Native American, 0.18% Asian, and 0.85% from two or more races. Hispanic or Latino of any race were 0.72% of the population.

There were 837 households, out of which 35.1% had children under the age of 18 living with them, 57.1% were married couples living together, 8.6% had a female householder with no husband present, and 30.0% were non-families. 26.5% of all households were made up of individuals, and 11.0% had someone living alone who was 65 years of age or older. The average household size was 2.56 and the average family size was 3.12.

Age spread: 29.2% under the age of 18, 8.5% from 18 to 24, 28.7% from 25 to 44, 22.0% from 45 to 64, and 11.6% who were 65 years of age or older. The median age was 35 years. For every 100 females, there were 102.5 males. For every 100 females age 18 and over, there were 96.8 males.

The median income for a household in the city was $41,006, and the median income for a family was $48,300. Males had a median income of $35,326 versus $22,150 for females. The per capita income for the city was $17,662. About 5.2% of families and 6.7% of the population were below the poverty line, including 10.0% of those under age 18 and 4.2% of those age 65 or over.

== Education ==
Colfax–Mingo Community School District operates area public schools. The Colfax and Mingo school districts consolidated on July 1, 1985.

== Notable people ==
- James Norman Hall (1887–1951), author best known for the novel Mutiny on the Bounty
- Herschel F. Briles (1914–1994), United States Army soldier and Medal of Honor recipient
- James B. Weaver (1833–1912), 1892 presidential candidate of the People's Party, U.S. Representative, and mayor of Colfax
- Joe Laws (1911–1979), American football player for the Green Bay Packers
