= Jasper County, Iowa =

County in Iowa, United States

- County
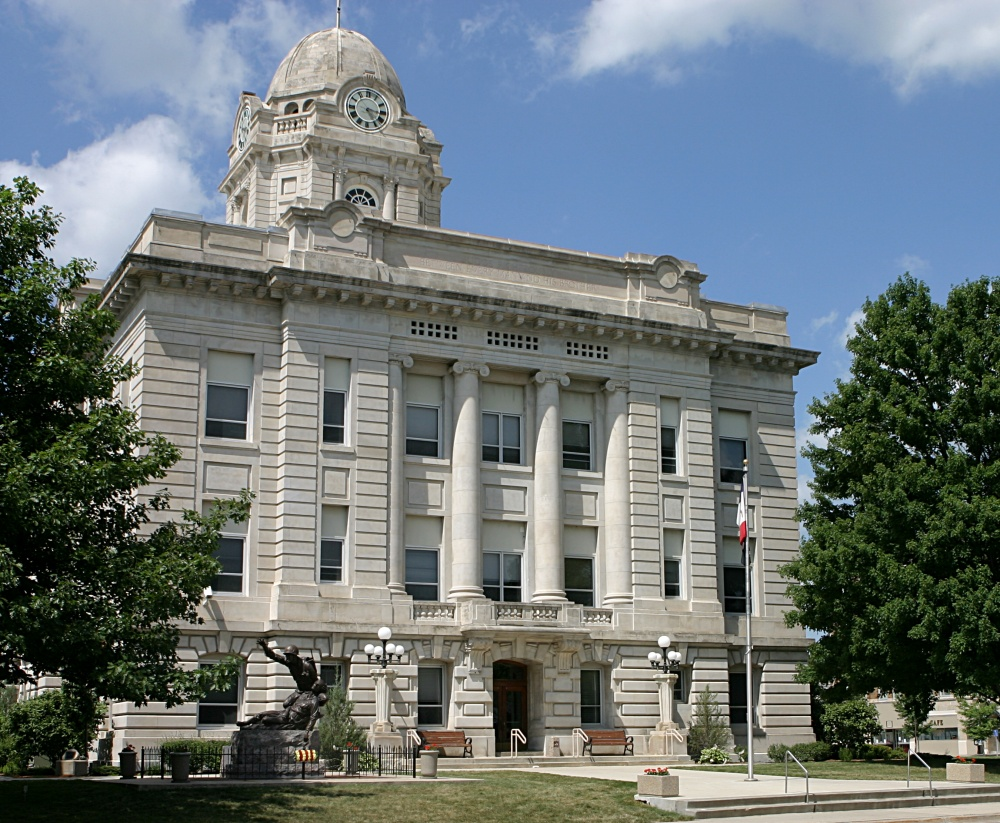
- The Jasper County Courthouse in Newton

- Location within the U.S. state of Iowa
- Coordinates: 41°41′17″N 93°03′41″W
- Country: United States
- State: Iowa
- Founded: 1846
- Named for: William Jasper
- Seat: Newton
- Largest city: Newton

Area
  - Total: 733 sq mi (1,900 km^{2})
  - Land: 730 sq mi (1,900 km^{2})
  - Water: 2.5 sq mi (6.5 km^{2}) 0.3%

Population (2020)
  - Total: 37,813
  - Estimate (2025): 38,153 ▲
  - Density: 52/sq mi (20/km^{2})
- Time zone: UTC−6 (Central)
  - Summer (DST): UTC−5 (CDT)
- Congressional district: 1st
- Website: jasperia.org
- Iowa county number 50

Jasper County is a county in the U.S. state of Iowa. As of the 2020 census, the population was 37,813. The county seat is Newton. The county was organized in 1846 and is named after Sergeant William Jasper, a Revolutionary War hero.

Jasper County is part of the Des Moines metropolitan area.

== Geography ==
According to the U.S. Census Bureau, the county has a total area of 733 square miles (1,900 km^{2}), of which 730 square miles (1,900 km^{2}) is land and 2.5 square miles (6.5 km^{2}) (0.3%) is water. The North and South Skunk River flow through the county. Bodies of water include Lake Mariposa and Rock Creek.

=== Major highways ===
- Interstate 80
- U.S. Highway 6
- U.S. Highway 65
- Iowa Highway 14
- Iowa Highway 117
- Iowa Highway 163
- Iowa Highway 224
- Iowa Highway 330

=== Adjacent counties ===
- Marshall County (north)
- Poweshiek County (east)
- Mahaska County (southeast)
- Marion County (south)
- Polk County (west)
- Story County (northwest)

== Demographics ==
Historical population
Census	Pop.	Note	%±
1850	1,280		—
1860	9,883		672.1%
1870	22,116		123.8%
1880	25,963		17.4%
1890	24,943		−3.9%
1900	26,976		8.2%
1910	27,034		0.2%
1920	27,855		3.0%
1930	32,936		18.2%
1940	31,496		−4.4%
1950	32,305		2.6%
1960	35,282		9.2%
1970	35,425		0.4%
1980	36,425		2.8%
1990	34,795		−4.5%
2000	37,213		6.9%
2010	36,842		−1.0%
2020	37,813		2.6%
2025 (est.)	38,153	▲	0.9%
U.S. Decennial Census; 1790–1960 1900–1990; 1990–2000 2010–2020

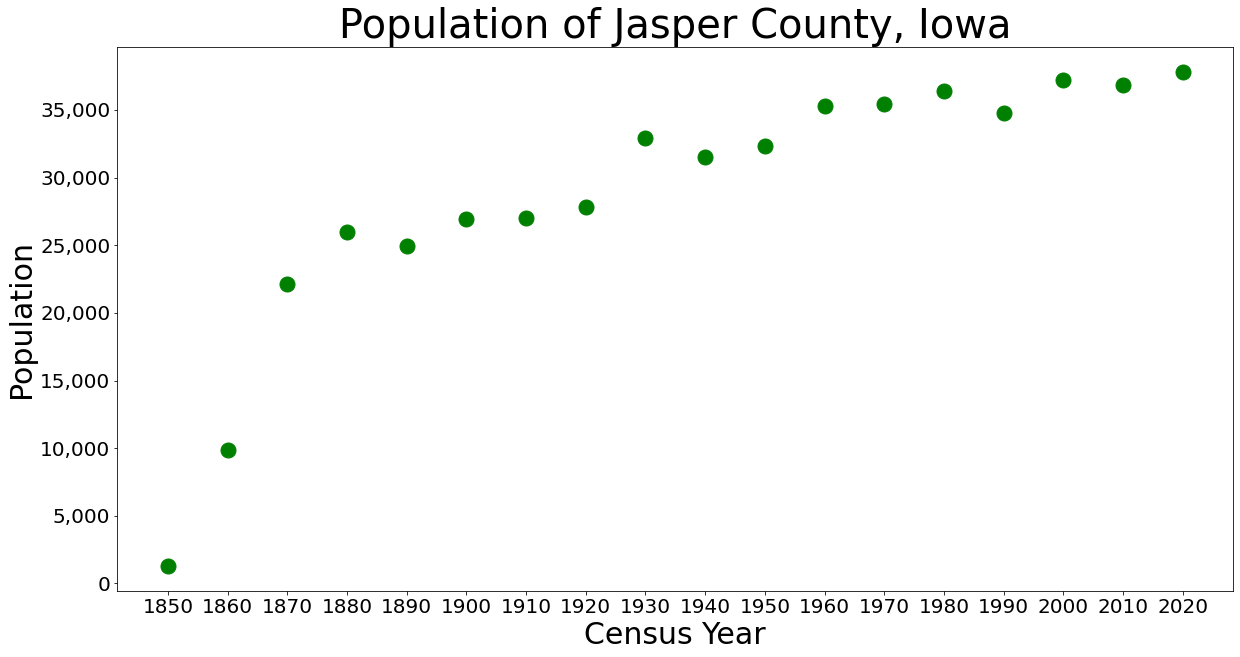
Population of Jasper County from the U.S. census data

=== 2020 census ===
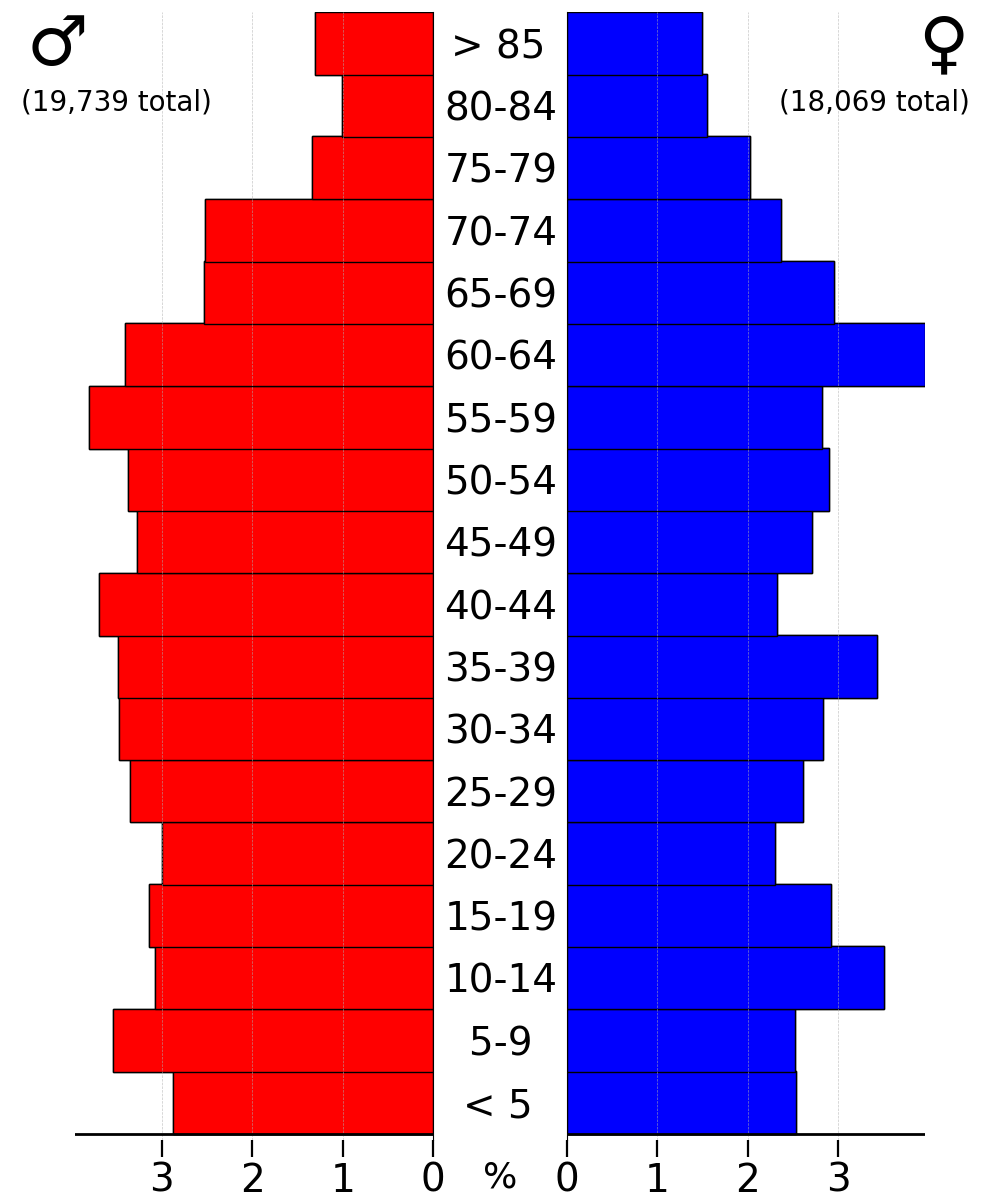
2022 US Census population pyramid for Jasper County from ACS 5-year estimates

As of the 2020 census, the county had a population of 37,813 and a population density of 51.5/sq mi (19.9/km^{2}). 96.04% of residents reported being of one race.

Jasper County Racial Composition
Race	Number	Percent
White (NH)	34,445	91.1%
Black or African American (NH)	683	1.8%
Native American (NH)	91	0.24%
Asian (NH)	215	0.57%
Pacific Islander (NH)	30	.08%
Other/Mixed (NH)	1,262	3.33%
Hispanic or Latino	1,087	3%

The median age was 42.1 years. 22.1% of residents were under the age of 18 and 19.5% of residents were 65 years of age or older. For every 100 females there were 106.6 males, and for every 100 females age 18 and over there were 106.2 males age 18 and over.

There were 14,994 households in the county, of which 28.2% had children under the age of 18 living in them. Of all households, 52.0% were married-couple households, 18.2% were households with a male householder and no spouse or partner present, and 23.0% were households with a female householder and no spouse or partner present. About 28.5% of all households were made up of individuals and 13.0% had someone living alone who was 65 years of age or older.

The racial makeup of the county was 92.2% White, 1.9% Black or African American, 0.3% American Indian and Alaska Native, 0.6% Asian, 0.1% Native Hawaiian and Pacific Islander, 1.0% from some other race, and 4.0% from two or more races. Hispanic or Latino residents of any race comprised 2.9% of the population.

42.2% of residents lived in urban areas, while 57.8% lived in rural areas.

There were 16,132 housing units, of which 14,994 were occupied. Among occupied housing units, 74.3% were owner-occupied and 25.7% were renter-occupied. The homeowner vacancy rate was 1.7% and the rental vacancy rate was 7.4%.

=== 2010 census ===
The 2010 census recorded a population of 36,842 in the county, with a population density of 50.5/sq mi (19.5/km^{2}). There were 16,181 housing units, of which 14,806 were occupied.

=== 2000 census ===
As of the census of 2000, there were 37,213 people, 14,689 households, and 10,267 families residing in the county. The population density was 51 people per square mile (20 people/km^{2}). There were 15,659 housing units at an average density of 22 units per square mile (8.5 units/km^{2}). The racial makeup of the county was 97.58% White, 0.83% Black or African American, 0.22% Native American, 0.44% Asian, 0.05% Pacific Islander, 0.26% from other races, and 0.62% from two or more races. 1.01% of the population were Hispanic or Latino of any race.

There were 14,689 households, out of which 31.70% had children under the age of 18 living with them, 59.30% were married couples living together, 7.40% had a female householder with no husband present, and 30.10% were non-families. 26.10% of all households were made up of individuals, and 11.80% had someone living alone who was 65 years of age or older. The average household size was 2.42 and the average family size was 2.92.

In the county, the population was spread out, with 24.60% under the age of 18, 7.40% from 18 to 24, 28.60% from 25 to 44, 23.40% from 45 to 64, and 16.00% who were 65 years of age or older. The median age was 38 years. For every 100 females there were 101.60 males. For every 100 females age 18 and over, there were 99.70 males.

The median income for a household in the county was $41,683, and the median income for a family was $50,071. Males had a median income of $36,001 versus $24,770 for females. The per capita income for the county was $19,622. About 4.80% of families and 6.50% of the population were below the poverty line, including 7.10% of those under age 18 and 7.00% of those age 65 or over.

== Government and infrastructure ==
The Iowa Department of Corrections Newton Correctional Facility is in an unincorporated area in Jasper County, near Newton.

United States presidential election results for Jasper County, Iowa
Year	Republican		Democratic		Third party(ies)	
Year	No.	%	No.	%	No.	%
1896	2,768	47.21%	3,019	51.49%	76	1.30%
1900	3,894	54.14%	3,163	43.97%	136	1.89%
1904	3,962	62.39%	1,942	30.58%	446	7.02%
1908	3,543	53.03%	2,889	43.24%	249	3.73%
1912	1,766	27.83%	2,487	39.20%	2,092	32.97%
1916	3,092	47.08%	3,282	49.97%	194	2.95%
1920	7,417	67.25%	3,390	30.74%	222	2.01%
1924	6,565	56.81%	1,214	10.50%	3,778	32.69%
1928	9,144	69.76%	3,857	29.42%	107	0.82%
1932	5,399	43.54%	6,781	54.68%	221	1.78%
1936	5,875	40.81%	8,315	57.76%	205	1.42%
1940	7,240	46.95%	8,129	52.71%	52	0.34%
1944	6,413	47.58%	6,978	51.77%	88	0.65%
1948	5,710	44.66%	6,684	52.28%	392	3.07%
1952	9,610	58.37%	6,756	41.03%	99	0.60%
1956	9,310	56.67%	7,098	43.21%	20	0.12%
1960	9,332	56.27%	7,242	43.67%	11	0.07%
1964	5,321	34.19%	10,216	65.65%	24	0.15%
1968	7,901	51.79%	6,556	42.98%	798	5.23%
1972	9,133	55.31%	7,007	42.43%	373	2.26%
1976	7,728	46.04%	8,783	52.32%	275	1.64%
1980	8,286	48.84%	7,258	42.78%	1,422	8.38%
1984	8,576	51.36%	8,023	48.04%	100	0.60%
1988	6,703	42.60%	8,940	56.82%	90	0.57%
1992	6,866	38.12%	8,120	45.08%	3,026	16.80%
1996	6,414	38.67%	8,776	52.92%	1,395	8.41%
2000	8,729	48.94%	8,699	48.77%	407	2.28%
2004	9,462	47.16%	10,430	51.99%	170	0.85%
2008	8,794	45.28%	10,250	52.78%	378	1.95%
2012	8,877	45.49%	10,257	52.56%	381	1.95%
2016	10,560	55.48%	7,109	37.35%	1,365	7.17%
2020	12,084	59.87%	7,737	38.33%	363	1.80%
2024	12,701	62.88%	7,141	35.35%	356	1.76%

== Communities ==
=== Cities ===
- Baxter
- Colfax
- Kellogg
- Lambs Grove
- Lynnville
- Mingo
- Mitchellville (part)
- Monroe
- Newton
- Oakland Acres
- Prairie City
- Reasnor
- Sully
- Valeria

=== Unincorporated communities ===
- Clyde
- Fairmount
- Galesburg
- Goddard
- Green Castle
- Ira
- Killduff
- Metz
- Murphy
- Newburg
- Rushville
- Vandalia

=== Townships ===
- Buena Vista
- Clear Creek
- Des Moines
- Elk Creek
- Fairview
- Hickory Grove
- Independence
- Kellogg
- Lynn Grove
- Malaka
- Mariposa
- Mound Prairie
- Newton
- Palo Alto
- Poweshiek
- Richland
- Rock Creek
- Sherman
- Washington

=== Population ranking ===
The population ranking of the following table is based on the 2020 census of Jasper County.

† county seat

Rank	City/Town/etc.	Municipal type	Population (2020 Census)	Population (2024 Estimate)
1	† Newton	City	15,760	15,766
2	Mitchellville (mostly in Polk County)	City	2,485	2,717
3	Colfax	City	2,255	2,277
4	Monroe	City	1,967	2,025
5	Prairie City	City	1,700	1,712
6	Baxter	City	962	1,022
7	Sully	City	881	901
8	Kellogg	City	606	615
9	Lynnville	City	380	394
10	Mingo	City	302	317
11	Oakland Acres	City	176	200
12	Lambs Grove	City	174	189
13	Reasnor	City	152	142
14	Valeria	City	39	29

== Notable people ==
- John M. Haines, tenth governor of Idaho; born in Jasper County.
- Lyle Goodhue, chemist and inventor, born in Jasper County.
- Sara Haines, American television host and journalist.

== See also ==
- National Register of Historic Places listings in Jasper County, Iowa
