= U.S. Route 52 in Iowa =

Section of U.S. Highway in Iowa, United States

U.S. Highway 52
- US 52 highlighted in red

Route information
- Maintained by Iowa DOT
- Length: 173.722 mi (279.578 km)
- Existed: 1935–present

Major junctions
- South end: US 52 / IL 64 at Savanna, IL
- US 67 near Sabula; US 61 / US 151 south of Dubuque; US 20 west of Dubuque; Iowa 3 at Luxemburg; US 18 at Postville; Iowa 9 at Decorah
- North end: US 52 near Burr Oak

Location
- Country: United States
- State: Iowa
- Counties: Jackson; Dubuque; Clayton; Allamakee; Winneshiek

Highway system
- United States Numbered Highway System; List; Special; Divided; Iowa Primary Highway System; Interstate; US; State; Secondary; Scenic
← Iowa 51	→ Iowa 56

U.S. Highway 52 (US 52) is a 166-mile-long (267 km) United States Numbered Highway in northeast Iowa. The route begins at the Dale Gardner Veterans Memorial Bridge over the Mississippi River between Sabula and Savanna, Illinois. From Sabula, it heads north along the Mississippi towards Bellevue and Dubuque. At Dubuque, US 52 briefly shares an expressway with US 61 and US 151 before joining the Southwest Arterial, another expressway diverting traffic around the southern edge of Dubuque.

West of Dubuque, the route concurrently follows the US 20 expressway before joining Iowa Highway 136 (Iowa 136) in Dyersville. At Luxemburg, it continues north towards Guttenberg. It then heads northwest where it overlaps US 18 for 15 miles (24 km). At Calmar, US 52 turns to the north towards Decorah. US 52 crosses into Minnesota north of Burr Oak.

Despite its even number, US 52 is signed as a north–south route. According to the layout of the U.S. Highway System, even-numbered routes are generally signed as east–west routes.

== Route description ==
US 52 begins in Iowa with Iowa 64 on the Dale Gardner Veterans Memorial Bridge over the Mississippi River north of Sabula. After descending the bridge, the two routes turn to the south and travel along a narrow, 2 1/2-mile-long (4.0 km) causeway through the Mississippi backwaters. The two routes pass through Sabula, a city known as Iowa's island city, and turn west crossing another causeway to the mainland. Upon rising from the river valley, US 52/Iowa 64 meets the northern end of US 67. Iowa 64 continues west with US 67, while US 52 turns north to follow the river.

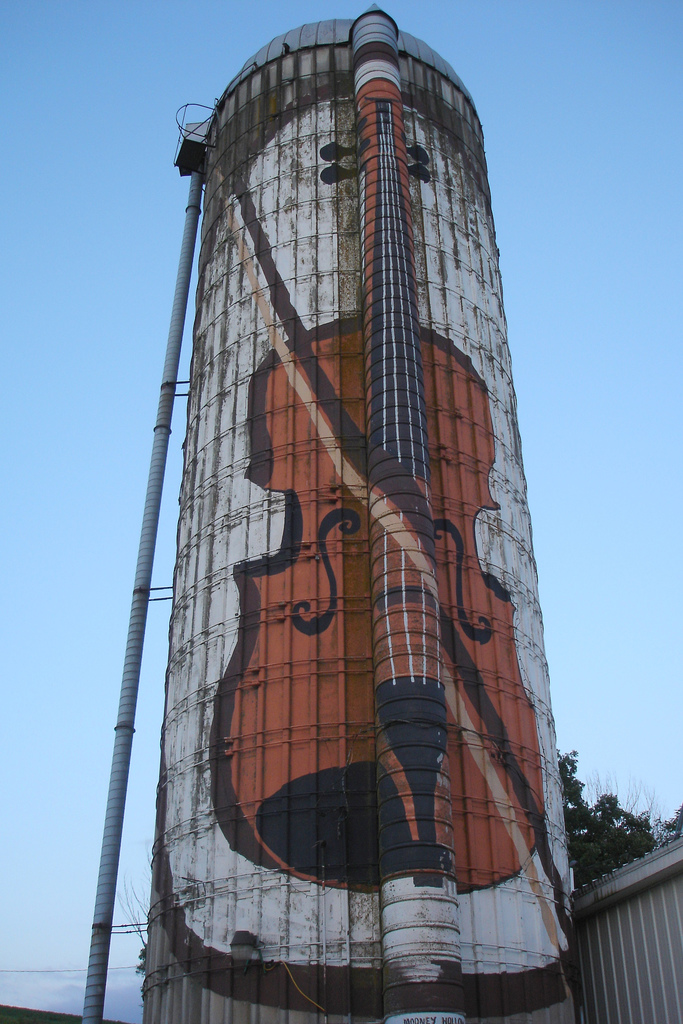
A violin painted on a silo near Green Island, a landmark along the route

Between Sabula and Bellevue, US 52 follows the course of the Mississippi River. The roadway gradually enters the Driftless Area, a region of the midwestern United States which escaped glaciation during the last glacial period. Near the unincorporated community of Green Island, the highway passes through terrain where the elevation ranges from 600–800 feet (180–240 m) above sea level. North of Green Island, where it crosses the Maquoketa River, US 52 follows the bluffs along the Mississippi River valley. The Canadian Pacific Railway, which runs parallel to US 52 between Green Island and Bellevue, in locations, lies 50 feet (15 m) below the road as the roadway follows the bluffs while the railroad tracks stay in the flat valley.

At Bellevue, US 52 runs along the city's riverfront and passes Lock and Dam No. 12, intersecting with the eastern terminus of Iowa 62. North of Bellevue, it turns to the northwest and rises 400 feet (120 m) in elevation and then descends 300 feet (91 m) at St. Donatus. North of St. Donatus, the highway travels 10 miles (16 km) and enters the Dubuque area.

At the unincorporated community of Key West near Dubuque, US 52 north turns south in a wrong-way concurrency onto the expressway carrying US 61 south and US 151 south. After traveling with the other two routes for two miles (3.2 km), US 52 exits at a folded diamond interchange onto the Southwest Arterial, a 6.1-mile (9.8 km), four-lane expressway. There is an overpass carrying Military Road, then a dogbone interchange with North English Road. After passing through the roundabout of a half-dogbone/half-diamond interchange from the US 20 expressway at the end of the arterial, US 52 passes over the US 20 expressway and merges onto its westbound lanes. The Southwest Arterial is largely freeway in character, however neither of its termini are free-flow interchanges.

US 52 north is co-signed with US 20 west for 20 miles (32 km), passing through the Dubuque County exurbs of Peosta, Epworth, and Farley before exiting north onto Iowa 136 in Dyersville. It follows this north-south route through New Vienna, passing near the Field of Dreams filming site, until the northern terminus of Iowa 136 in Luxemberg.

From Luxemburg, US 52 heads north towards Guttenberg. As it approaches the Mississippi River, the road reenters the Driftless Area. After crossing the Turkey River, the highway rises nearly 300 feet (91 m) in elevation before descending again at Guttenberg. North of Guttenberg, US 52 rises out of the Mississippi valley and travels west and then northwest away from the river. North of Garnavillo, it intersects Iowa 128, which serves as a cutoff to Iowa 13 near Elkader. Eight miles (13 km) later, it intersects Iowa 13 at its northern end.

One mile (1.6 km) north of the Iowa 13 intersection, US 52 intersects US 18. Between this location and Calmar, US 52 runs parallel to the DME Railroad. The two highways travel together to the northwest for 17 miles (27 km) through Monona and Postville. At Postville, US 18/US 52 intersect Iowa 51. On the west side of Postville, US 52 splits away from US 18 and heads to the northwest towards Calmar. At Calmar, US 52 turns to the north at an intersection which is also the eastern end of Iowa 24 and the northern end of Iowa 150. It heads to the north-northeast for nine miles (14 km) to an intersection with Iowa 9 on the southwest side of Decorah. From Iowa 9, the route crosses the Upper Iowa River near the Luther College campus. It heads north past the unincorporated community of Burr Oak. Two miles (3.2 km) north of Burr Oak, US 52 crosses the state line into Minnesota.

== History ==
US 52 was designated in Iowa in 1935, replacing US 55 from Iowa 117 near Sabula to the Minnesota state line north of Burr Oak. US 52 crossed the Mississippi River at the recently constructed Savanna–Sabula Bridge, which opened in 1932. The section of old US 55 from Iowa 117 to Dubuque ran concurrently with US 67 until 1967 when US 67 was truncated back to the intersection with US 52 on Iowa 64.

U.S. Highway 52 Alternate
- Location: Dubuque–Luxemburg
- Length: 29 mi (47 km)
- Existed: 1963–1967

From 1963 to 1967, rather than following its alignment from Dubuque direct to Luxemburg, US 52 was realigned to instead follow US 20 to Dyersville and then Iowa 136 to Luxemburg while the original alignment was being rebuilt. During this time, Iowa 136, which previously ended at US 52 in Luxemburg, was truncated back to US 20 at Dyersville, but it was redesignated along this segment after US 52 returned to its old alignment.

In the mid-1990s, US 52/US 61/US 151 in Dubuque was shifted onto a new expressway through downtown Dubuque, which means the three U.S. Highways no longer intersected US 20 directly. Iowa 946 was designated as a connector route to provide direct access to US 20 from the three U.S. Highways.

The alignment of US 52 from Dubuque direct to Luxemburg was a particularly curvy and dangerous section of the route. A study conducted by the Center for Transportation Research and Education at Iowa State University, found that between 2002 and 2006, over 240 accidents with six fatalities occurred on this alignment; the study supported this section's discontinuation as a U.S. Highway.

In April 2013, the City of Dubuque and surrounding jurisdictions proposed rerouting US 52 so that it would match the existing route from Clinton, Sabula and Bellevue, but now head south concurrent with US 61/US 151, bypassing Dubuque, rather than heading north, into Dubuque. Once reaching the proposed Southwest Arterial, US 52 would turn onto that new highway and at its end, share an alignment with US 20. US 52 and US 20 would continue on to Dyersville, then US 52 would split off and continue to Luxemburg. This new routing would be similar to US 52's alignment from 1963 to 1967. This new alignment of US 52 officially took place on August 17, 2020, with the completion of the Southwest Arterial.

A new Mississippi River crossing, the Dale Gardner Veterans Memorial Bridge, opened on November 17, 2017.

== Major intersections ==
County	Location	mi	km	Exit	Destinations	Notes
Mississippi River		0.000	0.000		US 52 east / IL 64 east – Savanna	Continuation into Illinois
Mississippi River		0.000	0.000		Dale Gardner Veterans Memorial Bridge	
Jackson	Union Township	3.756	6.045		US 67 south / Iowa 64 west / Great River Road south – Miles, Clinton	National end of US 67; northern end of Iowa 64 overlap; southern end of Great River Road overlap
Jackson	Bellevue Township				CR Z15 (362nd Avenue) / Grant Wood Scenic Byway – Springbrook	
Jackson	Bellevue	23.783	38.275		Iowa 62 west – Andrew	
Dubuque	Key West	44.206	71.143		US 61 north / US 151 north / Great River Road north – Dubuque	Southern end of US 61/US 151 overlap; northern end of Great River Road overlap
Dubuque	Table Mound Township	45.780– 46.184	73.676– 74.326	184	US 61 south / US 151 south – Cascade, Maquoketa	Northern end of US 61/US 151 overlap
Dubuque	Table Mound Township	49.819	80.176	49	English Mill Road, North Cascade Road	
Dubuque	Dubuque	51.175– 51.766	82.358– 83.309	314	US 20 east – Dubuque	Southern end of US 20 overlap; exit numbers follow US 20
Dubuque	Vernon Township	291.534	469.178	311	Swiss Valley Road / North Cascade Road	
Dubuque	Peosta	57.395	92.368	308	CR Y21 – Northeast Iowa Community College	
Dubuque	Epworth	61.55	99.06	304	CR Y17 – Epworth	
Dubuque	Farley	65.38	105.22	300	CR Y13 – Farley	
Dubuque	Dyersville	71.087– 71.562	114.403– 115.168	294	US 20 west / Iowa 136 south – Luxemburg, Waterloo	Northern end of US 20 overlap; former southern end of Iowa 136 overlap
Dubuque	Dyersville	72.421	116.550		2nd Avenue SE	Former US 20
Dubuque	Luxemburg	80.862	130.135		Iowa 3 – Colesburg, Dubuque	Former northern end of Iowa 136
Clayton	Millville				CR C9Y / Great River Road south	Southern end of Great River Road overlap
Clayton	Guttenberg				CR C7X (Garber Road) / River Bluffs Scenic Byway – Garber	
Clayton	Guttenberg				Great River Road north (Dekalb Street)	Northern end of Great River Road overlap
Clayton	Garnavillo Township	106.170	170.864		Iowa 128 west – Elkader	
Clayton	Farmersburg Township	114.315	183.972		Iowa 13 south / River Bluffs Scenic Byway – Elkader	Southern end of River Bluffs Scenic Byway overlap
Clayton	Giard Township	115.274	185.516		US 18 east / River Bluffs Scenic Byway – McGregor	Southern end of US 18 overlap; northern end of River Bluffs Scenic Byway overlap
Allamakee	Postville				CR B38 (S. Maple Street) / Driftless Area Scenic Byway	
Allamakee	Postville	130.564	210.122		Iowa 51 north (N. Lawler Street)	
Allamakee	Post Township	131.629	211.836		US 18 west – Clermont, West Union	Northern end of US 18 overlap
Winneshiek	Calmar	148.499	238.986		Iowa 24 west / Iowa 150 south – Fort Atkinson, West Union	
Winneshiek	Decorah	157.926	254.157		Iowa 9 – Decorah, Cresco	
Winneshiek	Burr Oak Township	173.722	279.578		US 52 north (Laura Ingalls Wilder Historic Highway) – Rochester	Continuation into Minnesota
1.000 mi = 1.609 km; 1.000 km = 0.621 mi: Concurrency terminus

== See also ==
- Northwest Arterial

U.S. Route 52
Previous state: Minnesota	Iowa	Next state: Illinois
