= U.S. Route 55 =

Former U.S. Numbered Highway in Iowa and Minnesota in the United States

U.S. Route 55
- US 55 highlighted in red on a modern map

Route information
- Length: 370 mi (600 km)
- Existed: 1926–1934

Major junctions
- South end: US 61 in Davenport, IA
- US 30 in Clinton, IA; US 20 / US 61 in Dubuque, IA; US 14 in Rochester, MN; US 65 in Farmington, MN
- North end: US 12 in Minneapolis, MN

Location
- Country: United States
- States: Iowa, Minnesota

Highway system
- United States Numbered Highway System; List; Special; Divided
| ← US 54 | → US 56 |

U.S. Highway 55 (US 55) was a 370-mile (600 km) north–south U.S. Numbered Highway in Iowa and Minnesota in the United States, that connected U.S. Route 61 (US 61) in Dubuque, Iowa with U.S. Route 10 / U.S. Route 12 (US 10 / US 12) in Minneapolis, Minnesota. Though it was part of the original 1926 numbering plan, it was deleted within 10 years.

== Route description ==
From its southern terminus in Davenport, Iowa, U.S. Highway 55 initially followed the route of present-day U.S. Highway 52 through Hampton, Minnesota excepting for later local improvements such as the Rochester and Decorah bypasses. It was deleted 90 years ago.

North of Hampton, Minnesota, U.S. Highway 55 headed north and west to downtown Minneapolis. Within the village of Hampton, Minnesota, U.S. Highway 55 followed along Main Street and present-day Minnesota Highway 50 to Farmington. Within Farmington, the highway had a shared segment with what was then U.S. Highway 65 (now Minnesota Highway 3) to Elm Street in Hampton.

From Farmington, U.S. Highway 55 headed westward to Burnsville via present-day 212th Street West, Lakeville Blvd, 210th Street West, Kenwood Trail, and Burnsville Parkway to Lyndale Ave (now Interstate 35W). Following the decommissioning of U.S. Highway 55, the portion of the route between Farmington and Burnsville was subsequently designated as a portion of Minnesota Highway 50, and transferred to County control in 1994 as Dakota County Road 50. From Burnsville, U.S. Highway 55 again turned northwards, following Lyndale Avenue across the Minnesota River and into Downtown Minneapolis via Lyndale Avenue, Lake Street, and 3rd Avenue.

== History ==
When the route was designated in 1926, its northern terminus was in Minneapolis at an intersection with U.S. Highway 12, near the Mississippi River. Its southern terminus was in Dubuque, Iowa, at an intersection with U.S. Highway 61 (or possibly U.S. Highway 20). In 1932, US 55 was extended south to Davenport, Iowa, to another intersection with US 61. While US 61 followed a more direct route from Dubuque to Davenport, the new US 55 extension followed the western shore of the Mississippi River.

Just two years later, in 1934, US 55 was deleted entirely. U.S. Highway 67 was extended through Davenport to Dubuque, absorbing the 1932 extension of US 55. The northern half of this stretch was co-signed with an extension of U.S. Highway 52, which took over the US 55 designation to Hampton, Minnesota. From Hampton, US 52 was routed to Saint Paul via Minnesota Highway 56 to Inver Grove Heights and Robert Street into downtown Saint Paul. The remainder of U.S. Highway 55 north and west of Hampton was designated as U.S. Highway 65. The prior routing of U.S. Highway 65 into from Farmington to Saint Paul was redesignated as U.S. Highway 218 for one year, and subsequently redesignated as Minnesota Highway 218, and later as Minnesota Highway 3.

The number "55" was later proposed for the route which would become U.S. Highway 56.

== Major intersections ==
| State | County | Location | mi | km | Destinations | Notes |
|---|---|---|---|---|---|---|
| Iowa | Scott | Davenport | 0 | 0.0 | US 61 | |
| Iowa | Clinton | Clinton | 38 | 61 | US 30 west | Southern end of US 30 overlap |
| Iowa | Clinton | Clinton | 40 | 64 | US 30 east / Iowa 136 north | Northern end of US 30 overlap |
| Iowa | Jackson | Union Township | 55 | 89 | Iowa 117 | |
| Iowa | Jackson | Bellevue | 76 | 122 | Iowa 62 west | |
| Iowa | Dubuque | Key West | 97 | 156 | US 61 south | Southern end of US 61 overlap |
| Iowa | Dubuque | Dubuque | 101 | 163 | US 20 | |
| Iowa | Dubuque | Dubuque | 102 | 164 | US 61 north | Northern end of US 61 overlap |
| Iowa | Dubuque | Luxemburg | 127 | 204 | Iowa 10 west / Iowa 188 south | |
| Iowa | Clayton | Garnavillo Township | 152 | 245 | Iowa 128 west | |
| Iowa | Clayton | Farmersburg Township | 161 | 259 | Iowa 13 south | Southern end of Iowa 13 overlap |
| Iowa | Clayton | Giard Township | 162 | 261 | US 18 east / Iowa 13 north | Southern end of US 18 overlap; northern end of Iowa 13 overlap |
| Iowa | Allamakee | Postville | 180 | 290 | Iowa 51 north | |
| Iowa | Allamakee | Post Township | 181 | 291 | US 18 west | Northern end of US 18 overlap |
| Iowa | Winneshiek | Calmar | 199 | 320 | Iowa 11 south / Iowa 24 west | |
| Iowa | Winneshiek | Decorah | 210 | 340 | Iowa 9 | |
| | | | 225 0 | 362 0.0 | Iowa–Minnesota state line | |
| Minnesota | Fillmore | Canton Township | 1 | 1.6 | TH 44 east | |
| Minnesota | Fillmore | Preston Township | 16 | 26 | US 16 east | Southern end of US 16 overlap |
| Minnesota | Fillmore | Fountain Township | 21 | 34 | US 16 west | Northern end of US 16 overlap |
| Minnesota | Olmsted | Rochester | 49 | 79 | US 14 east | Southern end of US 14 overlap |
| Minnesota | Olmsted | Rochester | 51 | 82 | TH 59 | |
| Minnesota | Olmsted | Rochester | 53 | 85 | US 14 west | Northern end of US 14 overlap |
| Minnesota | Goodhue | Zumbrota | 76 | 122 | TH 58 north | |
| Minnesota | Goodhue | Minneola Township | 78 | 126 | TH 21 west | |
| Minnesota | Goodhue | Cannon Falls | 97 | 156 | TH 20 north / TH 50 north | Northern end of TH 20 overlap; southern end of TH 50 overlap |
| Minnesota | Dakota | Farmington | 113 | 182 | US 65 | |
| Minnesota | Hennepin | Fort Snelling | 135 | 217 | TH 52 | |
| Minnesota | Hennepin | Minneapolis | 143 | 230 | TH 12 | |
| Minnesota | Hennepin | Minneapolis | 145 | 233 | US 10 / US 12 / TH 3 / TH 50 south | Northern end of TH 50 overlap |
1.000 mi = 1.609 km; 1.000 km = 0.621 mi: Concurrency terminus

== See also ==
- List of United States Numbered Highways
