= Iowa Highway 51 =

State highway in Iowa, United States

Iowa Highway 51
- Iowa 51 highlighted in red

Route information
- Maintained by Iowa DOT
- Length: 10.909 mi (17.556 km)

Major junctions
- South end: US 18 / US 52 in Postville
- North end: Iowa 9 near Waukon

Location
- Country: United States
- State: Iowa
- Counties: Allamakee

Highway system
- Iowa Primary Highway System; Interstate; US; State; Secondary; Scenic
| ← Iowa 48 | → US 52 |

Iowa Highway 51 (Iowa 51) is a state highway that runs from north to south in northeast Iowa. Contained entirely by Allamakee County, it is only 11 miles (18 km) in length. It begins at U.S. Highway 18 (US 18) and US 52 in Postville and ends at Iowa 9 near Waukon.

== Route description ==
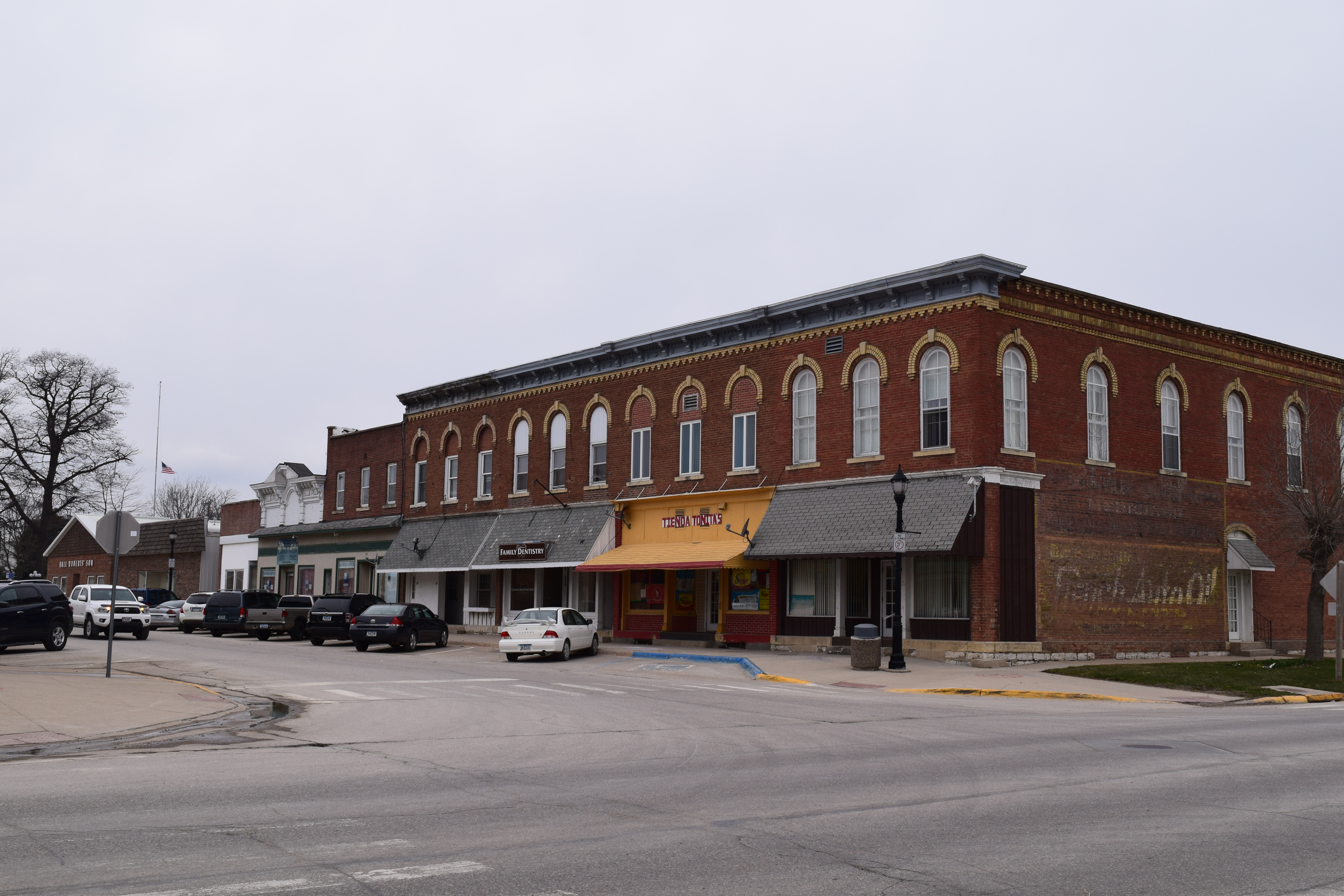
Iowa 51 is the street in the foreground in Postville.

Iowa 51 begins at the intersection of Tilden and Lawler Streets in Postville. US 18 and US 52 form the southern and western forks of the intersection, Tilden Street continues east, and Iowa 51 begins heading north along Lawler Street through Postville's downtown area. The highway crosses a line of the Dakota, Minnesota and Eastern Railroad and leaves Postville heading in an almost directly northward alignment. The only curves along the route come as the highway descends into and then ascends out of the Yellow River valley. Between Waukon and Decorah, the route terminates at an intersection with Iowa 9.

== History ==
When it was originally designated, Iowa 51 was not a paved highway. The route was fully paved by 1935, with the segment from the Yellow River south to Postville being repaved in 1969. Its initial alignment also extended the highway into Waukon, but was shortened to end at an intersection with the old alignment of Iowa 13 (changed to Iowa 76 in 1969) on December 8, 1924. The highway's alignment again changed in December 1968, when it was truncated to run from Postville to an intersection with Iowa 9, which is the present-day alignment.

== Major intersections ==
The entire route is in Allamakee County.

| Location | mi | km | Destinations | Notes |
|---|---|---|---|---|
| Postville | 0.000 | 0.000 | US 18 / US 52 – Clermont, Calmar, Monona | |
| Ludlow Township | 10.909 | 17.556 | Iowa 9 – Waukon, Decorah | |
1.000 mi = 1.609 km; 1.000 km = 0.621 mi
