= Iowa Primary Road No. 15 =

Primary Road No. 15

Route information
- Maintained by Iowa State Highway Commission

Location
- Country: United States
- State: Iowa

Highway system
- Iowa Primary Highway System; Interstate; US; State; Secondary; Scenic
← Iowa 14	→ Iowa 15

Primary Road No. 15 was a state highway in western Iowa. It is related to the current highways:

- U.S. Highway 169 between the Missouri state line and Winterset
- Iowa Highway 92 between Winterset and near Bevington
- Iowa Highway 28 between near Bevington and Des Moines
- U.S. Highway 69 between Des Moines and the Minnesota state line
