= Iowa Highway 56 =

Highway in Iowa

Iowa Highway 56
- Iowa 56 highlighted in red

Route information
- Maintained by Iowa DOT
- Length: 24.432 mi (39.319 km)
- Existed: 1920–present

Major junctions
- West end: Iowa 150 in West Union
- East end: Iowa 13 south of Elkader

Location
- Country: United States
- State: Iowa
- Counties: Fayette; Clayton

Highway system
- Iowa Primary Highway System; Interstate; US; State; Secondary; Scenic
← US 52	→ Iowa 57

Iowa Highway 56 (Iowa 56) is a state highway that runs from west to east in northeastern Iowa. It begins at Iowa Highway 150 in West Union and ends at Iowa Highway 13 south of Elkader. As a largely rural route, Iowa 56 passes through the farmland of Fayette and Clayton counties. Through Elkader and to its eastern end, the highway runs parallel to the Turkey River.

The 24-mile-long (39 km) highway is an original route from 1920. It originally extended from West Union to Guttenberg, but it was shortened to Elkader by 1925. Since then, both the western and eastern endpoints have shifted slightly, but the route otherwise remains the same.

== Route description ==
Iowa Highway 56 begins at an intersection with Iowa 150 in the southern part of West Union. The route starts out heading to the east, but turns to the south as it leaves the city limits. Approximately one mile (1.6 km) south of town, it curves to the south-southeast. Southeast of West Union, Iowa 56 splits the distance between the Volga River and Echo Valley state parks, each approximately two miles (3.2 km) from the highway. Being a largely rural route, it passes through the rolling farmland of Fayette and Clayton counties.

It continues to the south-southeast until it nears Elkader. There, it briefly turns to the northeast before turning southeast again along Second Street parallel to the Turkey River. The street plan of Elkader was influenced by the river, which flows from the northwest to southeast through town. Iowa 56 follows Bridge Street for one block; it heads to the southeast again along First Street. The highway meanders to the south, following the river, to an intersection with Iowa 13 near where that highway crosses the Turkey River. Clayton County's Turkey River Park is located at the intersection of Iowa 13 and Iowa 56.

== History ==
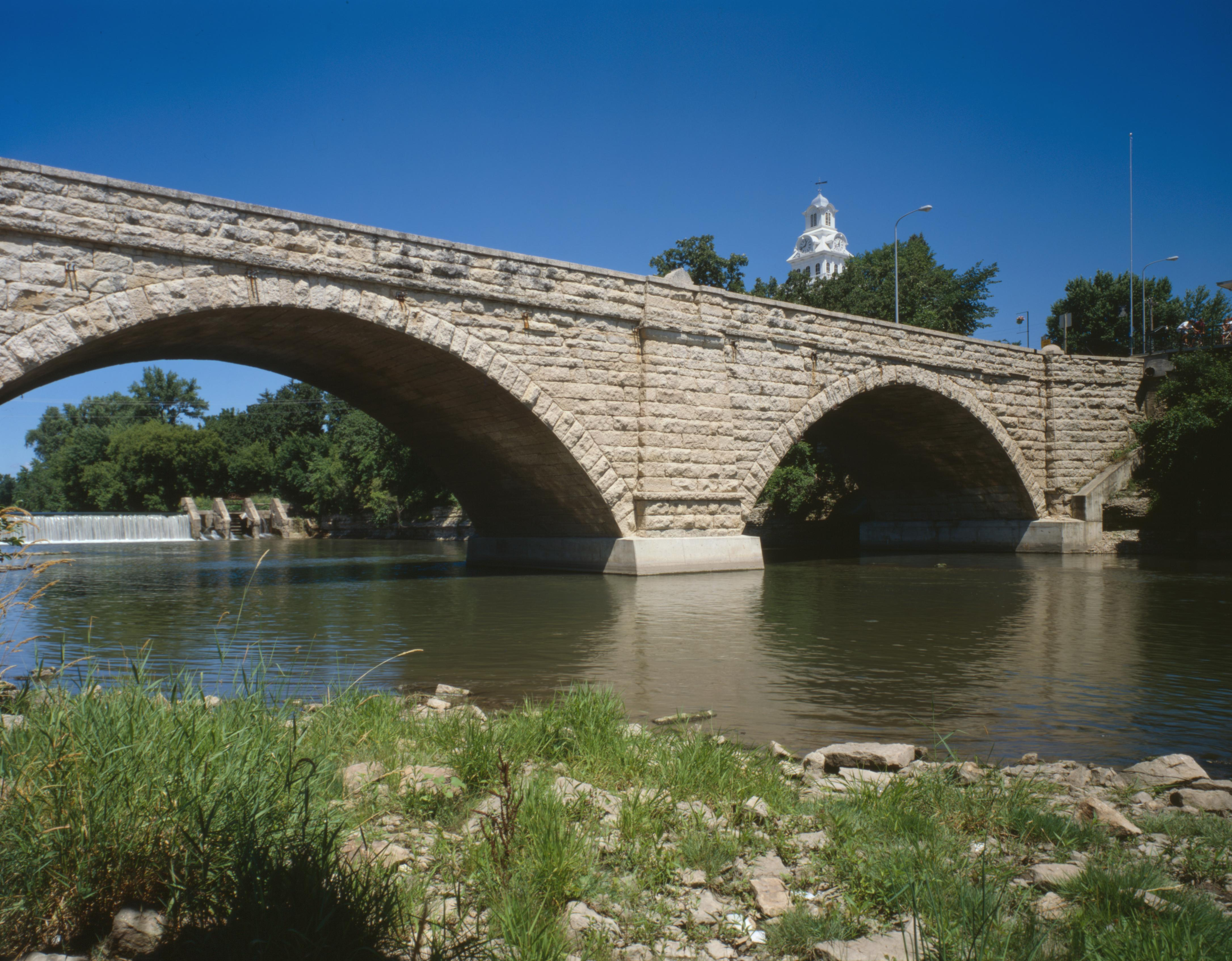
Iowa 56 originally crossed the Turkey River in Elkader

When the Iowa primary highway system was created in 1920, Primary Road No. 56 extended from West Union eastward to Guttenberg. It began in a different location in West Union than it does today, beginning at Primary Road No. 19 in the northeastern part of town. The route then headed south along Pine Street. In Elkader, Primary Road No. 56 joined Primary Roads No. 10 and No. 13 and crossed the Turkey River on the Keystone Bridge. Shortly after leaving Elkader, Primary Road No. 56 split away from the other two routes and headed east. It turned south at Primary Road No. 20 and the two routes headed to Guttenberg. The Primary Road No. 56 designation ended in Guttenberg.

Primary Road No. 56's length past Elkader did not last long. By 1925, the two overlaps were removed and the standalone stretch between them was renumbered Primary Road. No. 128. By the 1950s, the western end of the route shifted to its current position in West Union. In the early 1980s, a new bypass and Turkey River bridge were built around Elkader. Iowa 13 was shifted onto the bypass and Iowa 56 was extended southward along the former Iowa 13 to the new highway. In 2004, the two intersections of Iowa 56 along Bridge Street were rebuilt to allow large trucks to take the sharp turns. Roadwork began on June 1 and the street reopened on August 4.

== Major intersections ==
County	Location	mi	km	Destinations	Notes
Fayette	West Union	0.000	0.000	Iowa 150 – West Union, Fayette	
Clayton	Boardman Township	24.432	39.319	Iowa 13 – Strawberry Point	South of Elkader
1.000 mi = 1.609 km; 1.000 km = 0.621 mi
