= Iowa Highway 281 =

State highway in Iowa, United States

Iowa Highway 281
- Iowa 281 highlighted in red

Route information
- Maintained by Iowa DOT
- Length: 28.166 mi (45.329 km)

Major junctions
- West end: Waterloo city limits
- East end: Iowa 150 near Oelwein

Location
- Country: United States
- State: Iowa
- Counties: Black Hawk; Buchanan

Highway system
- Iowa Primary Highway System; Interstate; US; State; Secondary; Scenic
| ← Iowa 224 | → Iowa 316 |

Iowa Highway 281 (Iowa 281) is a 28-mile-long (45 km) state highway in north-central Iowa. Iowa 281 begins at the eastern city limits of Waterloo and ends at Iowa Highway 150 south of Oelwein.

== Route description ==
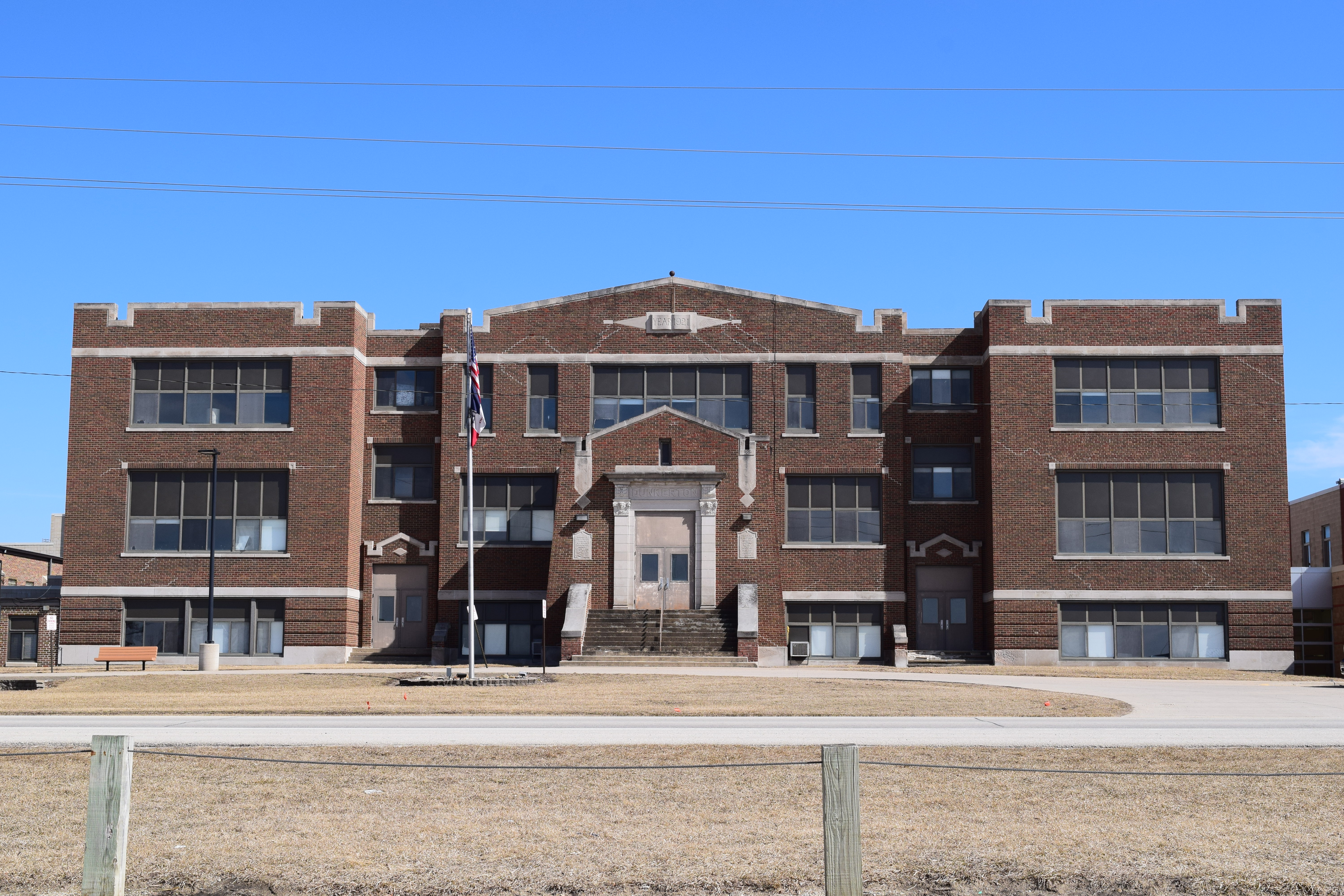
Iowa 281 passes Dunkerton High School in Dunkerton.

Iowa Highway 281 begins at the eastern city limits of Waterloo along what is Independence Avenue in Waterloo. It heads due east for 5 1/2 miles (8.9 km) until it reaches an intersection with Black Hawk County Roads D20 (CR D20) and V51 (CR V51). CR V51 connects Iowa 281 to an interchange with U.S. Highway 20 located 3 1/2 miles (5.6 km) to the south. At the intersection, Iowa 281 turns to the north, while CR D20 continues to the east.

Iowa 281 travels north for 9 miles (14 km), passing through Dunkerton and crossing Crane Creek. It turns to the east, 1/2 mile (0.80 km) south of the Bremer County line and crosses the Wapsipinicon River. From the Wapsipinicon, it takes an S-curve to the north and east and enters Fairbank in Buchanan County, where it crosses the Little Wapsipinicon River. East of Fairbank, Iowa 281 takes another S-curve which places the highway on the Buchanan County / Fayette County line. Iowa 281 heads east along the county line until its end at Iowa Highway 150 south of Oelwein.

== History ==
Originally, Iowa Highway 281 was a spur route from U.S. Highway 20 to Dunkerton. In 1957, when US 20 was rerouted to the south, Iowa 281 was extended along the former alignment of US 20 to US 63 in Waterloo. In 1980, it was extended along County Road V3C in Black Hawk and Buchanan Counties and took over the routing of Iowa Highway 190, which was a spur route connecting Fairbank to Iowa Highway 150 south of Oelwein. On the 1986 Iowa DOT map, Iowa 281 was routed south of D20 along V51 to the new US-20 freeway, but by 1986, Iowa 281 was again routed west of V51 along D20 to the eastern city limit of Waterloo.

== Major intersections ==
| County | Location | mi | km | Destinations | Notes |
|---|---|---|---|---|---|
| Black Hawk | Waterloo | 0.000 | 0.000 | Independence Avenue | Iowa 281 begins at the Waterloo city limit |
| Black Hawk | Barclay Township | 5.082 | 8.179 | CR D20 east / CR V51 south to US 20 | Iowa 281 turns to the north |
| Black Hawk | Lester Township | 12.072 | 19.428 | CR C54 | Iowa 281 turns to the east |
| Buchanan | No major junctions | | | | |
| Buchanan–Fayette county line | Oelwein | 28.166 | 45.329 | Iowa 150 | |
1.000 mi = 1.609 km; 1.000 km = 0.621 mi
