= Iowa Highway 128 =

State highway in Iowa, United States

Iowa Highway 128
- Iowa 128 highlighted in red

Route information
- Maintained by Iowa DOT
- Length: 6.982 mi (11.236 km)
- Existed: 1924–present

Major junctions
- West end: Iowa 13 northeast of Elkader
- East end: US 52 north of Garnavillo

Location
- Country: United States
- State: Iowa
- Counties: Clayton

Highway system
- Iowa Primary Highway System; Interstate; US; State; Secondary; Scenic
← Iowa 127	→ I-129

Iowa Highway 128 is a state highway entirely within Clayton County, in northeastern Iowa. It begins at Iowa 13 northeast of Elkader and ends at U.S. Highway 52 (US 52) north of Garnavillo. The highway was originally part of Iowa 56 before becoming its own route. Iowa 128's route remains the same as when it was first designated.

== Route description ==
Iowa 128 begins a T-intersection with Iowa 13 two miles (3.2 km) north of Elkader. It passes through rolling farmland on the western edge of the Driftless Area, a geologically distinct area of northeastern Iowa characterized by undulating terrain, high bluffs, and low river valleys. It travels nearly seven miles (11 km) to the east until it ends at an intersection with US 52 one mile (1.6 km) north of Garnavillo.

== History ==
When the primary highway system was created in 1920, what is now Iowa 128 was designated as a part of Primary Road No. 56 (No. 56). That road began in West Union and traveled east to Elkader, where it was joined by No. 10 / No. 13. The three routes shared two miles (3.2 km) before No. 56 split away to the east. It then joined No. 20 and headed southeast to its eastern end in Guttenberg. In 1924, No. 56 was shortened to end at No. 10 / No. 13 in Elkader. The overlappings along No. 10 / No. 13 and No. 20 were removed and the remaining standalone section became No. 128.

== Major intersections ==
The entire route is in Clayton County.

Location	mi	km	Destinations	Notes
Boardman Township	0.000	0.000	Iowa 13 – Elkader, McGregor	
Garnavillo Township	6.982	11.236	US 52 – Garnavillo, Guttenberg, Monona	
1.000 mi = 1.609 km; 1.000 km = 0.621 mi
