= Iowa Highway 100 =

State highway

Iowa Highway 100
- Iowa 100 highlighted in red

Route information
- Maintained by Iowa DOT
- Length: 16.140 mi (25.975 km)

Major junctions
- West end: US 30 / US 218 near Cedar Rapids
- I-380 / Iowa 27 in Cedar Rapids; US 151 Bus. in Cedar Rapids
- East end: US 151 / Iowa 13 in Marion

Location
- Country: United States
- State: Iowa
- Counties: Linn

Highway system
- Iowa Primary Highway System; Interstate; US; State; Secondary; Scenic
← Iowa 99	→ Iowa 102

Iowa Highway 100 (Iowa 100) is a state highway located in Linn County, Iowa. The route is located primarily in Cedar Rapids and Marion and is known locally as Collins Road. It begins at US 30 / US 218 in western Cedar Rapids and ends at U.S. Highway 151 / Iowa Highway 13 (US 151 / Iowa 13) in Marion.

== Route description ==
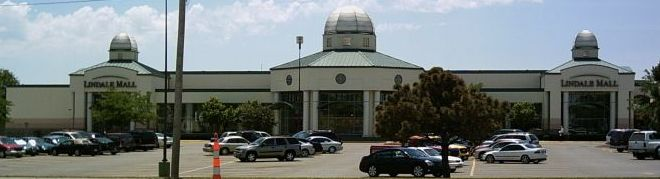
Lindale Mall

Iowa 100 begins at a semi-directional T-Interchange with US 30 / US 218 in southwest Cedar Rapids. The road heads northeast along a highway that roughly outlines the western city limits. It crosses the Cedar River about 1.5 miles (2.4 km) before it intersects with Edgewood Road NE at a single-point urban interchange. The road heads east towards I-380. At I-380, the mainline of Iowa 100 passes high above the interstate. Collector-distributor lanes (C-D lanes) for each highway intersect at an intermediate level between the highways. East of the volleyball interchange, the C-D lanes of Iowa 100 intersect Center Point Road NE before rejoining the mainline at the end of the highway.

Continuing east, Iowa 100 passes the Collins Aerospace complex on the north and the studios for KGAN-TV on the south. It enters a shopping district centered around Lindale Mall. Just east of the mall, the highway intersects U.S. Highway 151 Business (US 151 Business), which runs along 1st Avenue. South of 1st Avenue, Iowa 100 leaves Cedar Rapids and enters Marion. The highway turns southeast briefly and then straightens out to the east. It roughly marks the southern extents of Marion as the only neighborhoods that lie north of the highway. It continues slightly northeast and then east again and ends at an intersection with US 151 and Iowa 13 on the eastern edge of Marion.

== History ==
Iowa 100 was designated in the early 1980s after the southern end of Iowa 150 was relocated to Vinton. It originally followed the length of Collins Road NE in Cedar Rapids from I-380 to 1st Avenue. A plan to extend the route west of I-380 to Edgewood road was completed in 1986.

In 1996 an extension was constructed eastward, through southern Marion, to US 151 / Iowa 13. Envisioned in the 1960s as a bypass of Marion, the route extension served as a development corridor for the city by providing access to its southern limits.

Planning for the extension of Iowa 100 from Edgewood Road NE to US 30 / US 218 in western Linn County was seen as controversial. The Linn County Conservation Board noted environmental concerns in areas such as the Rock Island Forest Preserve. Construction nonetheless began in the early 2010s and was completed on December 12, 2018.

== Major intersections ==
The entire route is in Linn County.

Location	mi	km	Exit	Destinations	Notes
Clinton Township	0.000– 0.766	0.000– 1.233	0	US 30 / US 218 / 80th Street – Cedar Rapids, Tama, Fairfax	Western terminus; opened December 12, 2018; US 30 exit 246A
Clinton Township	1.612	2.594	1	E Avenue	
Clinton Township	4.095	6.590	3	Covington, Cedar Rapids	Formerly Iowa 94; opened December 15, 2016
Cedar Rapids	7.850	12.633	7	Edgewood Road	
Cedar Rapids	9.154– 9.622	14.732– 15.485	9	I-380 / Iowa 27 / Center Point Road	I-380 exits 24A–B
Cedar Rapids	12.072	19.428		US 151 Bus. (1st Avenue)	
Marion	16.140	25.975		CR E45 east (Secrist Road) / US 151 / Iowa 13	Eastern terminus; road continues as CR E45 (Secrist Road)
1.000 mi = 1.609 km; 1.000 km = 0.621 mi: Incomplete access
