= Iowa Highway 24 =

State highway in Iowa, United States

Iowa Highway 24
- Iowa 24 highlighted in red

Route information
- Maintained by Iowa DOT
- Length: 27.546 mi (44.331 km)

Major junctions
- West end: US 18 / US 63 at New Hampton
- East end: US 52 / Iowa 150 at Calmar

Location
- Country: United States
- State: Iowa
- Counties: Chickasaw; Winneshiek

Highway system
- Iowa Primary Highway System; Interstate; US; State; Secondary; Scenic
← Iowa 23	→ Iowa 25

Iowa Highway 24 (Iowa 24) is a state highway that runs from west to east in northeast Iowa. It has a length of 27.5 miles (44.3 km).

== Route description ==
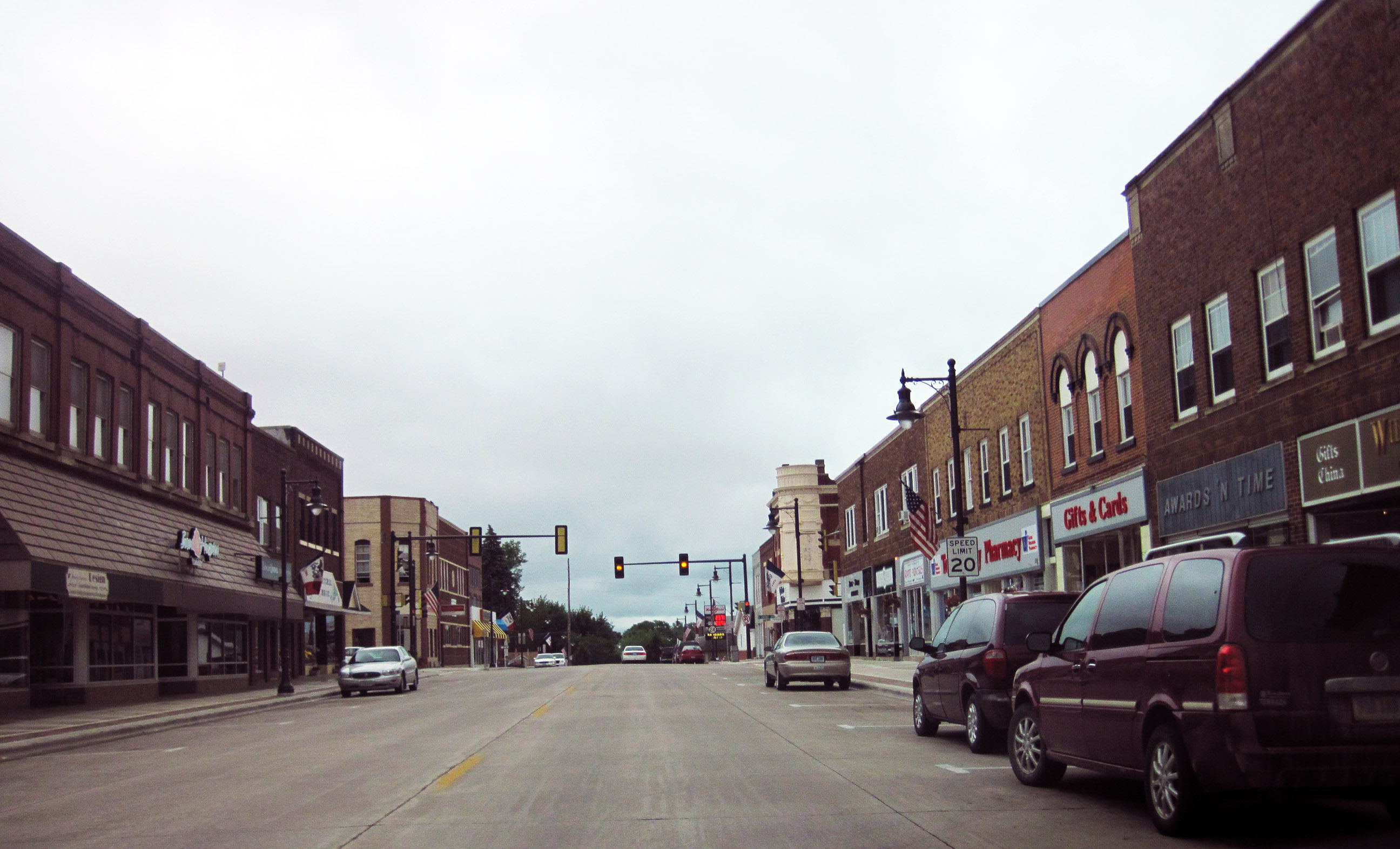
Iowa 24 as it passes through New Hampton

Iowa Highway 24 begins at New Hampton at a freeway interchange with U.S. Highway 63 and U.S. Highway 18. It goes east through New Hampton, then continues east to Lawler. It then turns northeast to go through Jackson Junction and Fort Atkinson. It then continues northeast and ends in Calmar at an intersection with U.S. Highway 52 and Iowa Highway 150.

== History ==
The current version of Iowa Highway 24 is the second occurrence of the route number in the state. The first lasted from 1920 to 1927 and extended between Council Bluffs and Ottumwa. The present highway came into existence on December 1, 1928. On October 5, 2002, the highway was extended west through New Hampton as the U.S. 63 freeway bypass opened.

== Major intersections ==
County	Location	mi	km	Destinations	Notes
Chickasaw	New Hampton	0.000	0.000	US 18 / US 63 – Fredericksburg, Lime Springs, Waterloo, Mason City	
Winneshiek	Calmar	27.546	44.331	US 52 / Iowa 150 south – Decorah, Postville, West Union	
1.000 mi = 1.609 km; 1.000 km = 0.621 mi
