= Iowa Highway 150 =

State highway in Iowa, United States

Iowa Highway 150
- Iowa 150 highlighted in red

Route information
- Maintained by Iowa DOT
- Length: 85.093 mi (136.944 km)

Major junctions
- South end: US 218 in Vinton
- I-380 / Iowa 27 near Urbana; US 20 at Independence; Iowa 3 at Oelwein; US 18 at West Union
- North end: US 52 / Iowa 24 at Calmar

Location
- Country: United States
- State: Iowa
- Counties: Benton; Buchanan; Fayette; Winneshiek

Highway system
- Iowa Primary Highway System; Interstate; US; State; Secondary; Scenic
| ← Iowa 149 | → US 151 |
| ← Iowa 10 | Iowa 11 | → Iowa 12 |
| ← Iowa 100 | Iowa 101 | → Iowa 102 |
| ← Iowa 904 | Iowa 920 | → Iowa 922 |

Iowa Highway 150 (Iowa 150) is an 85-mile-long (137 km) state highway in eastern and northeastern Iowa. It begins at U.S. Route 218 (US 218) in Vinton and ends at US 52 and Iowa 24 in Calmar. From Vinton, it heads north and east towards Urbana where it meets Interstate 380 (I-380) and Iowa 27, the Avenue of the Saints highway. At Independence, it intersects US 20 on the south side of town. Further north, it converges with Iowa 3 in Oelwein.

As it traverses through the east-central part of the state, Iowa 150 mostly passes through farmland where acreages and farmsteads dot the landscape. Through the towns along the route, the highway generally brings traffic through the central business districts of each town. In Fayette however, the highway bypasses the downtown area. Between Fayette and West Union, part of the route forms the western leg of the River Bluffs Scenic Byway, which passes through Iowa's "Little Switzerland" region.

The Iowa 150 designation has been a part of the primary highway system since its inception in 1920. The current route was formed in 1941. The route extended from Calmar to Davenport, by way of Cedar Rapids. In 1969, the route was truncated at Cedar Rapids, with part of the old route becoming Iowa 130. In 1984, it took its current form when the southern part of the route was shifted over the former Iowa 101. Most of the abandoned part of Iowa 150 became Iowa 920 until July 1, 2003.

== Route description ==
Iowa 150 begins at a T intersection with US 218 on the southern side of Vinton. US 218 comes up from the south and turns west at the intersection while Iowa 150 begins heading north along C Street. Near downtown, the highway turns to the east for a few blocks. At the Benton County Courthouse, it turns north once again and almost immediately crosses the Cedar River. North of Vinton, the highway passes a small airport surrounded by fields and then curves to the east for a few miles. West of Urbana, it heads back to the north and intersects Interstate 380 (I-380).

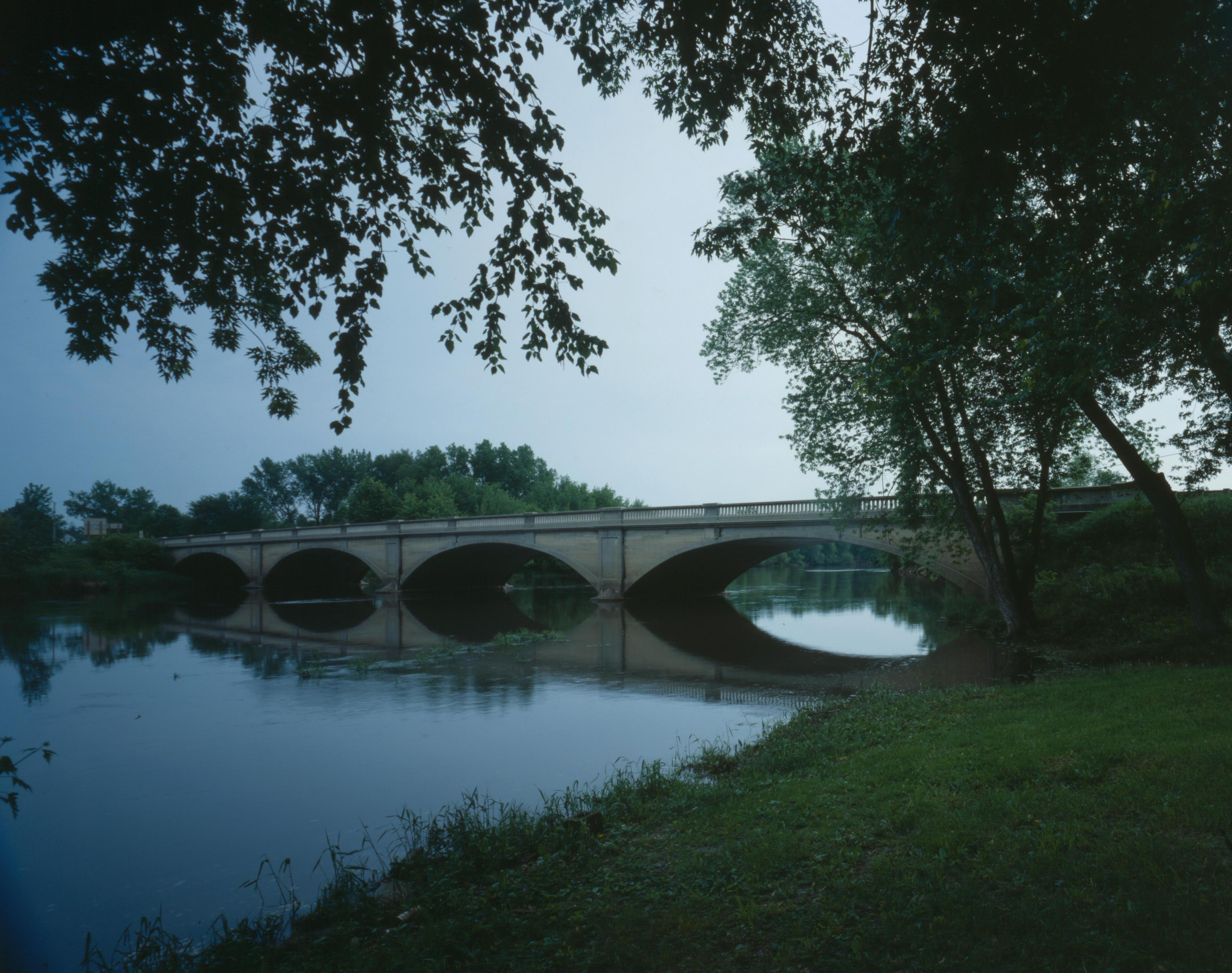
Iowa Highway 150 crosses the Wapsipinicon River in Independence. This bridge is listed on the National Register of Historic Places.

North of I-380, Iowa 150 intersects 51st Street. Prior to 1984, Iowa 150 came from the north along its current route and turned east onto 51st Street and Iowa 101 followed the current path of Iowa 150 to Vinton. The highway heads due north, only passing a few houses until it reaches US 20 south of Independence. Once in Independence, it crosses the Wapsipinicon River over a concrete arch bridge. At 1st Street, the route turns east for two blocks before returning northward. On the north side of town, Iowa 150 passes the Independence Motor Speedway.

North of Independence, Iowa 150 continues north through the farmland of rural Buchanan County. It passes through Hazleton a few miles before it meets Iowa 281 south of Oelwein. North of Iowa 281, which runs along the Buchanan–Fayette county line, Iowa 150 enters Oelwein along Rock Island Road, which eases into 1st Avenue. A block east of downtown, at Charles Street, Iowa 3 approaches from the east and turns north onto Iowa 150. The two routes head through Oelwein along Frederick Avenue and split a couple miles north of town. The highway turns east very briefly and returns heading north until it reaches Fayette County Road C33 (CR C33). There, it turns east to go through Maynard and continues east until an intersection with Iowa 187. Iowa 187 comes from the south and ends at the intersection, while Iowa 150 turns north and continues towards Fayette.

At Fayette, the home of Upper Iowa University, Iowa 150 intersects Iowa 93 and crosses the Volga River on the north side of town. Between Fayette and West Union, the highway forms the western leg of the River Bluffs Scenic Byway, through the area known locally as "Little Switzerland". In West Union, the route meets the western end of Iowa 56 on the south side and then US 18 in the heart of town. North of West Union, the route gradually eases to the west through a series of curves. South of the unincorporated community of Festina, the route straightens out on its way to Calmar. As Iowa 150 comes up from the south, the route ends in Calmar at an intersection with US 52, which comes in from the east and turns north, and Iowa 24, which comes in from the west.

== History ==
There have been three iterations of Iowa 150 that have been shown on maps since the primary highway system was created in 1920. The first, designated in 1925, was a short connector route between US 32 in Homestead and US 30 in Cedar Rapids. This route that later became part of Iowa 149 is currently part of US 151.

The second version first appeared on state maps in 1932. At first, the route went south from Jefferson to Iowa 46 between Jamaica and Herndon. Iowa 271, a spur route from Panora north to Yale, was designated in 1935. Three years later, Iowa 150 was extended southward along Iowa 271, leaving only the short east–west portion of the supplanted highway with the 271 designation. By 1942, all of Iowa 150 had been overtaken by Iowa 17, which was relocated south of Jefferson.

=== Current route ===
The current Iowa 150 was created shortly after Iowa 17 supplanted the former Iowa 150 in the west-central part of the state. The new Iowa 150 replaced Iowa 11, which stretched from Calmar to Cedar Rapids via Independence, in its entirety. Through Cedar Rapids, the highway entered from the north along Center Point Road NE. It turned west onto US 151 and Iowa 64 along 1st Avenue E near Coe College. It turned south onto 10th Street SE on which it traveled for a few blocks to the corner of Mount Vernon Road and 8th Avenue SE, which carried US 30 east and west, respectively.

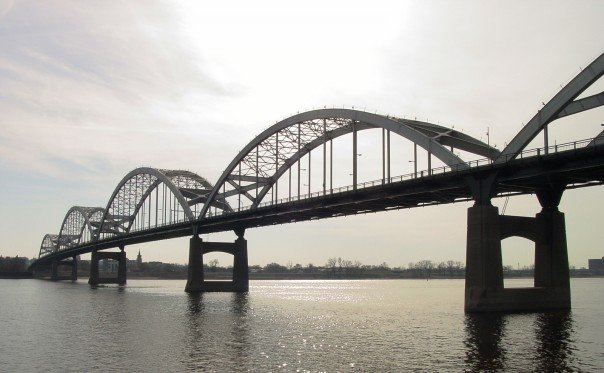
The current Iowa 150 originally began on the Centennial Bridge in Davenport

From Cedar Rapids, the route continued south and east by overlapping US 30 and Iowa 38 to Tipton. It also entirely replaced Iowa 74, which stretched from Tipton to Davenport. Through Davenport, the highway entered from the northwest along the aptly named Northwest Boulevard. Further into town, it intersected Kimberly Road and then transitioned onto Harrison Street. In downtown, the highway overlapped US 61 and US 67 along 4th Street, briefly along Gaines Street, and then along 2nd Street. Iowa 150 followed US 67 onto the Centennial Bridge where it ended at the state line over the Mississippi River. On the Illinois side of the bridge, US 150 began at the state line.

During the 1950s, as today's highway system was beginning to take shape, Iowa 150 was rerouted a couple times in Cedar Rapids. The first adjustment happened in 1954, when US 30 was taken off of Mount Vernon Road and put onto a new road on the south side of town. Iowa 150 was moved west through downtown and across the Cedar River. It turned south onto 6th Street SW, on which US 30 and US 218 joined at 18th Avenue SW. The three routes turned east onto the new road, but US 218 turned south at Bowling Street SW. Within five years, Iowa 150 moved to the northeast side of Cedar Rapids and into Marion. Instead of continuing south to Coe College, it turned east at Collins Road and connected with US 151 and Iowa 64 near the eastern city limits. It then followed those two routes to downtown Marion, where it turned south onto a road which headed southeast towards Mount Vernon. East of Mount Vernon, it followed US 30 to Iowa 38 and continued towards Davenport. Within a few years, Iowa 150 was rerouted onto the newly extended Iowa 13, which was extended south to US 30 near Bertram. At its longest extent, the route was 180.52 miles (290.52 km) long.

That all changed on January 1, 1969, when the Iowa State Highway Commission reorganized its primary highway system. The commission reassigned sections of highway with new numbers and removed duplicate numbers where they were unnecessary. In Iowa 150's case, the route was truncated at US 151 in Cedar Rapids. The duplications along US 151, Iowa 13, US 30, and Iowa 38 were removed and the remaining segment from Tipton to Davenport was renumbered Iowa 130. The route's new length was 97.96 miles (157.65 km).

The southern end of Iowa 150 changed again in 1984. After I-380, which was constructed parallel to Iowa 150 between Cedar Rapids and Center Point, was opened to traffic, Iowa 150's routing south of Iowa 101 was essentially redundant to the new interstate. As a result, Iowa 150 was rerouted over Iowa 101 south to Vinton. The vacated section of Iowa 150 was renumbered Iowa 920 from old Iowa 101's north end to Center Point and Iowa 921 from Center Point to Cedar Rapids.

In the 1980s, Iowa 150 near Oelwein was rerouted onto a new section of highway along the former right-of-way of the recently liquidated Rock Island Railroad. Originally proposed as a four-lane highway, pressure from Oelwein residents caused the Iowa Transportation Commission to approve a three-lane highway instead. The new section of highway was open by 1986. The old section of Iowa 150 remained on the primary highway system as the unsigned Iowa 916 until July 1, 2003.

Construction is currently underway to realign the curves 4.5 miles north of Independence. The project has been under discussion since the release of a road safety audit in December 2009.

=== Flooding in 2008 ===
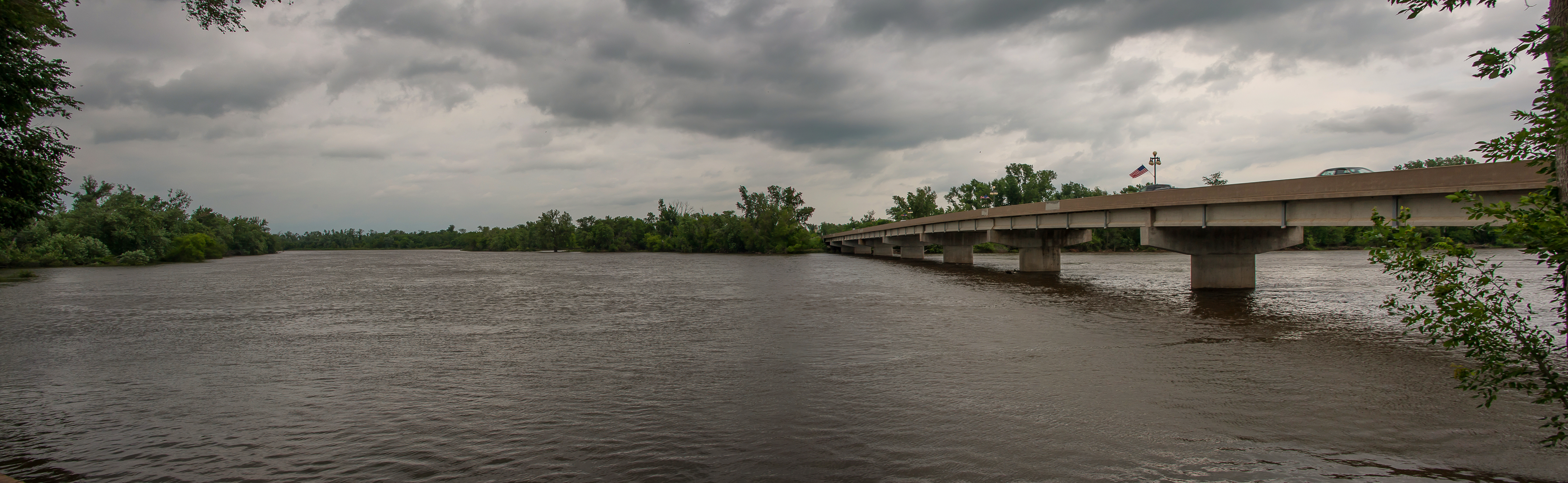
The Iowa 150 bridge at Vinton

On June 11, 2008, about 2 miles (3.2 km) of Iowa 150 north of Vinton closed for a few months after flood waters from the Cedar River destroyed the roadway. North of the intersection with County Road E16 (CR E16), a 400-foot-long (120 m) section of roadbed was completely washed away. By the end of the month, one lane the bridge over the Cedar River had reopened to local traffic and farmers. Reopening the bridge saved drivers from having to use a 22-mile-long (35 km) detour. By August, Iowa 150 was reopened to all traffic from Vinton to CR E16. The washed-out section of highway was rebuilt, repaved, and reopened on September 10, almost three months after it closed.

== Major intersections ==
| County | Location | mi | km | Destinations | Notes |
|---|---|---|---|---|---|
| Benton | Vinton | 0.000 | 0.000 | US 218 – Cedar Rapids, La Porte City | Southern terminus; road continues as US 218 south (24th Avenue) |
| Benton | Urbana | 12.912 | 20.780 | I-380 / Iowa 27 – Waterloo, Cedar Rapids | I-380 exit 43 |
| Buchanan | Independence | 26.971 | 43.406 | US 20 | |
| Buchanan–Fayette county line | Oelwein | 41.194 | 66.295 | Iowa 281 west | |
| Fayette | Oelwein | 43.713 | 70.349 | Iowa 3 east (Charles Street) | Southern end of Iowa 3 overlap |
| Fayette | Jefferson Township | 46.242 | 74.419 | Iowa 3 west | Northern end of Iowa 3 overlap |
| Fayette | Smithfield Township | 55.642 | 89.547 | Iowa 187 south | |
| Fayette | Fayette | 60.524 | 97.404 | Iowa 93 west (Water Street) | |
| Fayette | West Union | 68.003 | 109.440 | Iowa 56 east (Franklin Street) | |
| Fayette | West Union | 68.890 | 110.868 | US 18 (Bradford Street) | |
| Winneshiek | Calmar | 85.093 | 136.944 | Iowa 24 west (Main Street) / US 52 | Northern terminus; road continues as US 52 north (Maryville Street) |
1.000 mi = 1.609 km; 1.000 km = 0.621 mi: Concurrency terminus

== Related routes ==
=== Iowa Highway 101 ===
Iowa Highway 101
- Location: Benton County
- Length: 15.56 mi (25.04 km)
- Existed: 1920–1984

Iowa Highway 101 (Iowa 101) was a highway in Benton and Buchanan counties. It was an original primary highway designated in 1920 from Primary Road No. 40 in Vinton to Primary Road No. 5 in Independence. The northern half of the route was overlapped by Primary Route No. 11, which would become Iowa 150. By 1924, Primary Road No. 101 was truncated to an intersection with Primary Road No. 11 west of Walker. The 15.6-mile-long (25.1 km) highway would largely remain the same for the next sixty years. In 1984, Iowa 150 was rerouted over the highway and the Iowa 101 designation was removed. The former section of Iowa 150 became Iowa 920 and Iowa 921.

=== Iowa Highway 920 ===
Iowa Highway 920
- Location: Iowa 150–Center Point
- Length: 12.560 mi (20.213 km)
- Existed: 1984–July 1, 2003

Iowa Highway 920 (Iowa 920) was the northern half of the section of Iowa 150 that was vacated when it was rerouted over Iowa 101. It began at the same intersection in Benton County west of Walker where Iowa 101 ended. Iowa 920 headed east towards Walker, where the highway skirted the edge of town by curving to the south. The route headed due south along Center Point Road for a few miles until it curved southwest and back to the southeast into Center Point. Through Center Point, the highway was known as Franklin Street. In the southern part of town, where Center Point Road turned south, Iowa 920 ended.

In 2002, the Road Use Tax Fund Committee, a mix of city, county, and state transportation officials, met to review and recommend changes to Iowa's public road system. The report was necessitated by increasing costs to maintain the highway system and a level of funding that was not keeping up with the rising costs. The committee identified over 700 miles (1,100 km) of state highways, including Iowa 920, which could be turned over to local jurisdictions. Most of the committee's recommendations were accepted and on July 1, 2003, Iowa 920 and over 600 miles (970 km) of state highways were turned over to the counties or local jurisdictions. The east–west portion near Walker was replaced by CR D62, while the north–south portion became CR W6E.

The portion of Center Point Road south of Center Point was known as Iowa 921 for about a year. The 12.5-mile-long (20.1 km) route extended south to Hiawatha. It was turned over to Linn County by 1986 as sections of I-380, which was being built adjacent to Center Point Road, opened to traffic. The rural parts of Center Point Road became known as CR W6E, while the parts in Hiawatha are simply known as Center Point Road.
