= Iowa Highway 13 =

State highway in Iowa, United States

Iowa Highway 13
- Iowa 13 highlighted in red

Route information
- Maintained by Iowa DOT
- Length: 85.235 mi (137.172 km)
- Existed: 1920–present

Major junctions
- South end: US 30 / US 151 near Bertram
- Iowa 100 in Marion; US 151 / US 151 Bus. in Marion; US 20 in Manchester; Iowa 3 from Edgewood to Strawberry Point
- North end: US 52 in Froelich

Location
- Country: United States
- State: Iowa
- Counties: Linn; Delaware; Clayton

Highway system
- Iowa Primary Highway System; Interstate; US; State; Secondary; Scenic
← Iowa 12	→ Iowa 14

Iowa Highway 13 (Iowa 13) is a north–south highway in eastern Iowa. It has a length of 85 1/4 miles (137.2 km). The southern terminus of Iowa Highway 13 is at U.S. Route 30 (US 30) south of Bertram and southeast of Cedar Rapids. The northern terminus is at US 52 in rural Clayton County near the towns of Monona and Farmersburg near the intersection of US 52 and US 18.

== Route description ==
Iowa Highway 13 begins in Linn County at U.S. 30 southeast of Cedar Rapids in an overlap with US 151 at a freeway interchange just east of the Cedar River. They go north as a divided highway through Bertram. They intersect Iowa Highway 100 at Marion and then separates from U.S. 151 in Marion as well. It continues north from Marion to Central City, where the divided highway ends. It goes north to Coggon, then turns east briefly before turning north to enter Delaware County and go through Ryan. After passing through Ryan, it goes north to Manchester, where it intersects US 20. It continues north through Manchester and intersects Iowa 3 at the southern border of Clayton County west of Edgewood. It overlaps Iowa 3 and goes northwest into Strawberry Point, where they separate. Iowa 13 then turns northeast and intersects Iowa 56 southwest of Elkader. After running along the eastern edge of Elkader, it then intersects Iowa 128. It then continues northeast and ends at US 52 near Farmersburg.

== History ==
Primary Road No. 13 was one of the original routes of the primary highway system, which was formed in 1920. Its original extent was statewide, starting at the Missouri state line south of Bloomfield and ending at the Minnesota state line north of Waukon. When the U.S. Highway System came around in 1926, Primary Road No. 13 was shortened significantly. The southernmost part of the route became US 63, between Ottumwa and Homestead, the route was replaced by Iowa 149, and from Homestead to Cedar Rapids, it was replaced by Iowa 150.

The route stayed more or less the same until it was shortened again in 1969. The northernmost section of road, from McGregor to Minnesota, was renumbered to Iowa 76 to match the numbered route it became after crossing into Minnesota. Between Froelich and McGregor, Iowa 13 overlapped US 18 and US 52. Since 1969, the routing of Iowa 13 has not changed.

== Major intersections ==
County	Location	mi	km	Destinations	Notes
Linn	Bertram	0.000	0.000	US 30 / US 151 south – Mount Vernon, Cedar Rapids	Southern end of US 151 overlap
Linn	Marion	6.622	10.657	Iowa 100 west (Collins Road) – Marion	
Linn	Marion	7.714	12.414	US 151 north (Dubuque Road) / US 151 Bus. south (10th Avenue) – Marion, Springville	Northern end of US 151 overlap
Delaware	Manchester	39.522	63.604	US 20 – Waterloo, Dubuque	Exit 275 on US 20
Delaware	Edgewood	56.858	91.504	Iowa 3 east – Edgewood	Southern end of IA 3 overlap
Clayton	Strawberry Point	58.985	94.927	Iowa 3 west (Mission Street) – Oelwein	Northern end of IA 3 overlap
Clayton	Elkader	72.884	117.295	Iowa 56 west (Strawberry Point Road) – Elkader, West Union	
Clayton	Elkader	76.404	122.960	Iowa 128 east – Garnavillo	
Clayton	Froelich	85.235	137.172	US 52 – Monona, McGregor, Garnavillo, Guttenberg	
1.000 mi = 1.609 km; 1.000 km = 0.621 mi: Concurrency terminus
