= Interstate 129 =

Highway in Iowa and Nebraska

Interstate 129
- I-129 highlighted in red

Route information
- Auxiliary route of I-29
- Length: 3.50 mi (5.63 km) Nebraska: 3.21 mi (5.17 km); Iowa: 0.286 mi (460 m)
- Existed: November 22, 1976–present
- NHS: Entire route

Major junctions
- West end: US 20 in South Sioux City, NE
- US 75 / US 77 in South Sioux City, NE
- East end: I-29 / US 20 / US 75 in Sioux City, IA

Location
- Country: United States
- States: Nebraska; Iowa
- Counties: NE; Dakota; IA; Woodbury

Highway system
- Interstate Highway System; Main; Auxiliary; Suffixed; Business; Future
← N-128	NE	→ N-133
← Iowa 128	IA	→ Iowa 130

Interstate 129 (I-129) is an auxiliary Interstate Highway which connects South Sioux City, Nebraska, to I-29 in Sioux City, Iowa. Opened in 1976, I-129 is a 3.5-mile-long (5.6 km) route, running 3.21 miles (5.17 km) in Nebraska. At 0.286 miles (0.460 km), I-129 is the shortest highway in the state of Iowa. All of the route's length is concurrent with U.S. Route 20 (US 20) and most of its length is concurrent with US 75.

== Route description ==
I-129 begins along US 20 on the western edge of South Sioux City, Nebraska, just west of exit 1, a cloverleaf interchange with US 75 and US 77. US 77 travels north through South Sioux City before ending at I-29 in Sioux City while US 75 joins I-129 and US 20. One mile (1.6 km) later, I-129/US 20/US 75 intersect Dakota Avenue at a partial cloverleaf interchange. U.S. Highway 20 Business (US 20 Bus.) is designated along Dakota Avenue.

East of Dakota Avenue, I-129/US 20/US 75 travels south of South Sioux City and passes through rolling farmland. For the rest of I-129's length, the two directions of I-129/US 20/US 75 traffic are separated by a Jersey barrier instead of a grassy median. The three routes cross the Missouri River and immediately intersect I-29 at an interchange. Due to the minimum amount of space along the Missouri River banks, the I-29 interchange is a modified two-level cloverstack interchange. At I-29, US 20 and US 75 continue east around Sioux City and I-129 ends.

== History ==
After the passage of the Federal-Aid Highway Act in 1968, the mileage which would eventually be manifested in over 1,400 miles (2,300 km) of Interstate Highway was allocated to the states. Iowa received the smallest allocation, 0.5 miles (0.80 km), for the southern bypass of Sioux City. The proposed highway was planned to cost $22.5 million (equivalent to $169.13 million in 2024), which included $15 million (equivalent to $112.76 million in 2024) for the Missouri River bridge. On the 1973 state highway map, the Iowa State Highway Commission showed the planned route on the state map for the first time. I-129 was opened on November 22, 1976.

== Exit list ==
State	County	Location	mi	km	Exit	Destinations	Notes
Nebraska	Dakota	Covington Precinct	0.00	0.00		US 20 west	Western end of US 20 concurrency; continuation beyond western terminus
Nebraska	Dakota	Covington Precinct	0.38– 0.40	0.61– 0.64	1	US 75 south / US 77 – Fair Grounds, Sioux City	Western end of US 75 concurrency; signed as exits 1A (south) & 1B (north)
Nebraska	Dakota	South Sioux City	1.50	2.41	2	Dakota Avenue (US 20 Bus. east) – South Sioux City, Dakota City	Western terminus of US 20 Bus.
Missouri River			3.21 0.000	5.17 0.000	Sergeant Floyd Memorial Bridge; Nebraska–Iowa line		
Iowa	Woodbury	Sioux City	0.286	0.460	1	I-29 / US 75 Bus. north – Council Bluffs, Sioux Gateway Airport, Downtown Sioux City	Eastern end of US 20 and US 75 concurrencies; eastern terminus of I-129; southern terminus of US 75 Bus.; signed as exits 1A (south) and 1B (north); I-29 exits 144A-B
Iowa	Woodbury	Sioux City	0.286	0.460		US 20 east / US 75 north – Fort Dodge, Le Mars	Continuation beyond I-29
1.000 mi = 1.609 km; 1.000 km = 0.621 mi: Concurrency terminus

Browse numbered routes
← Iowa 128	IA	→ Iowa 130
← N-128	NE	→ N-133
