= Garnavillo Township, Clayton County, Iowa =

Township in Iowa, US

Garnavillo Township
- Township
- Location in Clayton County
- Coordinates: 42°51′46″N 091°13′55″W
- Country: United States
- State: Iowa
- County: Clayton

Area
  - Total: 33.14 sq mi (85.82 km^{2})
  - Land: 33.14 sq mi (85.82 km^{2})
  - Water: 0 sq mi (0 km^{2}) 0%
- Elevation: 1,020 ft (311 m)

Population (2000)
  - Total: 1,008
  - Density: 30/sq mi (11.7/km^{2})
- GNIS feature ID: 0467901

Garnavillo Township is a township in Clayton County, Iowa, United States. As of the 2000 census, its population was 1,008.

== Geography ==
Garnavillo Township covers an area of 33.13 square miles (85.8 km^{2}) and contains one incorporated settlement, Garnavillo. According to the USGS, it contains six cemeteries: Ceres, Garnavillo, Jenkins, McClelland, Saint Joseph and Saint Joseph.

The stream of West Branch South Cedar Creek runs through this township.
