= Iowa Primary Highway System =

Highway System in Iowa, U.S.

- Iowa's primary highway system

- The state of Iowa is served by over 10,000 miles (16,000 km) of primary roads. The roads are spaced out evenly across the state, with clusters of primary roads near population centers.

System information
- Notes: Primary highways in Iowa are generally state-maintained.

Highway names
- Interstates: Interstate X (I-X)
- US Highways: U.S. Highway X (US X)
- State: Highway X (IA X or Iowa X)

System links
- Iowa Primary Highway System; Interstate; US; State; Secondary; Scenic

The primary highway system makes up over 9,000 miles (14,000 km), approximately 8 percent of the U.S. state of Iowa's public road system. The Iowa Department of Transportation is responsible for the day-to-day maintenance of the primary highway system, which consists of Interstate Highways, United States Highways, and Iowa state highways. Currently, the longest primary highway is U.S. Highway 30 at 332 miles (534 km). The shortest highway is Interstate 129 at 0.27 miles (430 m).

The 20th century was a transformative time for vehicular transportation. In the early years of the century, roads were problematic at best – dusty dirt roads when dry and impassably muddy when wet. Over time, federal money was set aside and bonds were issued allowing the roads to be paved. The U.S. Highway and Interstate Highway Systems connected Iowa to the rest of the country and made national travel feasible. Periodically, new highway construction and changing driving habits have resulted in the obsolescence of local highways, to which the primary highway system has adapted. The former primary highways, turned over to counties and local jurisdictions, county highways, and farm-to-market roads make up the secondary highway system.

Early on, Iowa's registered routes were marked with hand-painted signs created by the group maintaining the highways. When the primary highway system was created, prisoners in Iowa's correctional system began making highway signs. Today, Iowa's highway markers are compliant with standards set forth in the Manual on Uniform Traffic Control Devices.

== History ==
=== Early highways ===
At the turn of the 20th century, roads in Iowa were suited for horse and buggy and ill-suited for automobiles. As more Iowans purchased automobiles, the Iowa legislature set up in 1904 a commission at Iowa State College in Ames to handle issues that arose concerning travel and safety. In 1904, less than 2 percent, or just over 1,000 miles (1,600 km) of public roads in Iowa had been improved with gravel or broken stone. The first task of the Iowa State Highway Commission, now the Iowa Department of Transportation, was to study Iowa's problematic roads. At the time, roads were merely dusty dirt trails when dry, and quagmires of mud when wet. By 1906, every county was maintaining its dirt road with drags. Designed by Missourian E. Ward King, road drags were a cost-effective way to smooth out dirt roads, costing as much as $3.00 ($105.00, adjusted for inflation) to build. In 1913, the Commission separated from Iowa State College and gained control over county and local transportation officials, who were responsible for road construction and maintenance. The Iowa Highway Commission did not gain jurisdiction over public roads until 1924.

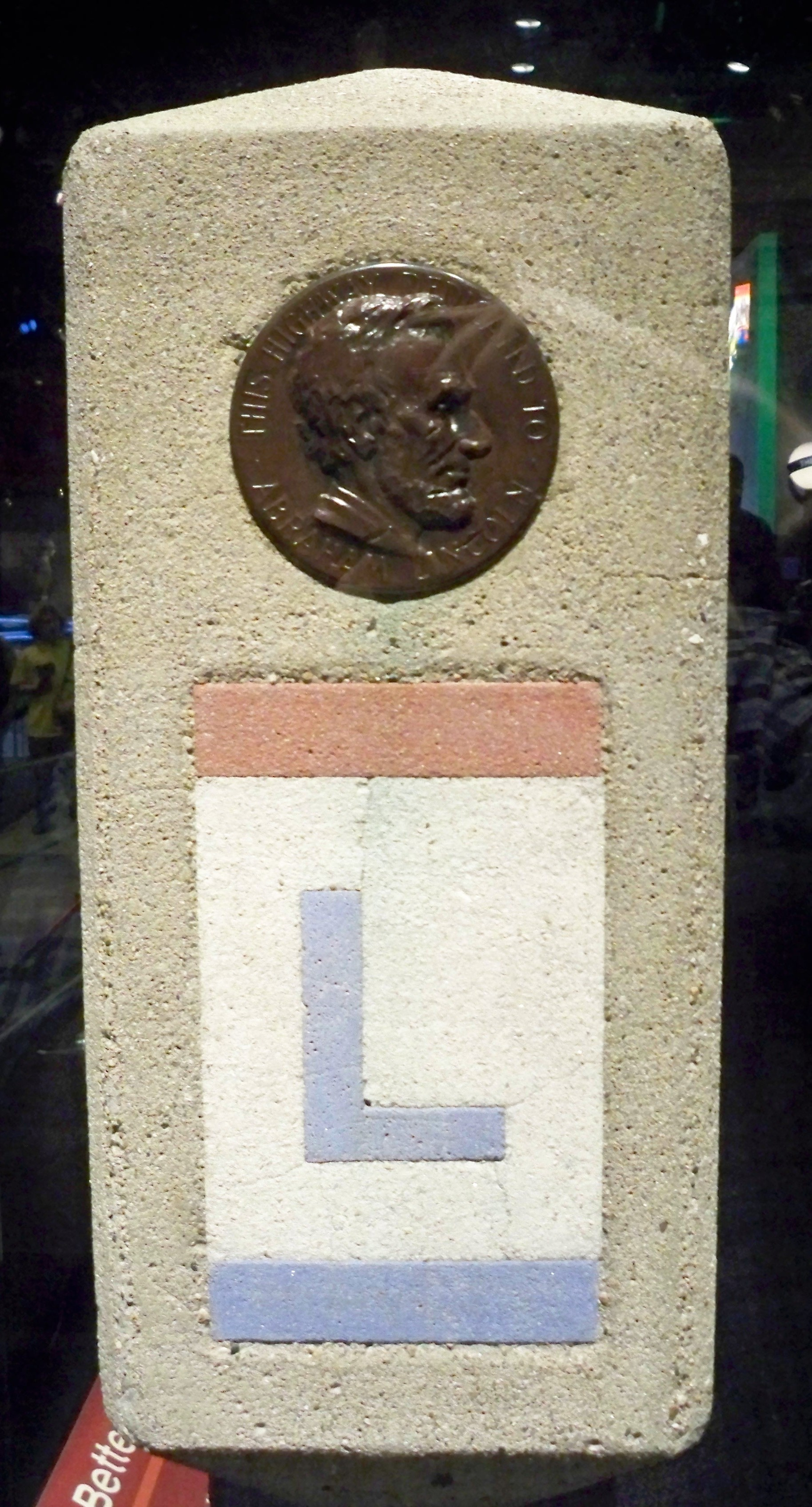
A concrete Lincoln Highway route marker as seen at the Smithsonian National Museum. Few of these markers still exist along the route.

The predecessor of the primary highway system was the registered route system. Organizations, such as the Lincoln Highway Association, volunteered to sponsor and register certain roads with the highway commission. Each organization chose their colors and designed route markers to guide motorists along the way. Eventually, confusion reigned and the highway commission took action. Beginning in 1920, primary road numbers were assigned to registered routes. Route numbers were assigned so they would match those of neighboring states – Primary Road Number 1 (No. 1) was assigned to the Jefferson Highway, the Lincoln Highway became No. 6, and the Red Ball Route became No. 40.

=== U.S. Highway System ===
In 1925, the American Association of State Highway Officials approved a national numbering system for roads, which quickly replaced the registered route system. The new U.S. Highway system grew and improved for thirty years, until Interstate highways were created. Iowa renumbered some primary roads in 1926; marking them with a unique number as to not duplicate the new U.S. Highways. Iowa highways were signed with a circle with the route's number beneath the word Iowa.

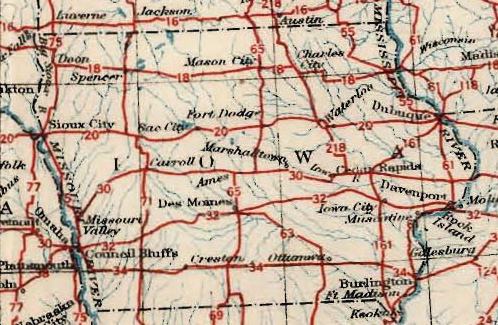
U.S. Highways in Iowa as designated in 1926

In the late 1920s and early 1930s, highway paving had begun in earnest. In September 1929 alone, the Iowa State Highway Commission spent $3 million ($54.9 million, adjusted for inflation) on road construction, with two-thirds of that spent on highway paving. By the end of 1929, the first roads connecting two state borders neared completion. The Lincoln Highway from Ames to Clinton made travel to Chicago easier, while the Jefferson Highway from Lamoni to Ames facilitated travel to Kansas City. These two new roads also made travel easier between Iowa's two most populous cities, Des Moines and Cedar Rapids.

=== Interstate Highway System ===
In the 1950s, the Iowa State Highway Commission planned an east-west toll road across the state, roughly along the current Interstate 80 corridor. When the Federal Aid Highway Act of 1956 created the Interstate Highway System, plans for the toll road were scrapped with great fervor. In Iowa, interstate corridors were designed to follow existing U.S. Highway corridors – Interstate 29 followed U.S. Route 75 and U.S. Route 275, Interstate 35 followed U.S. Route 65 and U.S. Route 69, and Interstate 80 followed U.S. Route 6. The first section of interstate highway in Iowa, a section of I-35 and of I-80 near West Des Moines, opened on September 21, 1958. Over the next 30 years, sections of interstate were completed and opened for traffic. As the interstates grew and expanded, many U.S. Highways were truncated at, relocated onto, or replaced by interstates. The last section of Interstate 380 to be completed, was opened on September 12, 1985.

=== System improvements ===
In 1959, the nascent Interstate Highway System was growing while the existing primary highway system was beginning to show its age. The 58th General Assembly passed a resolution creating the Iowa Highway Study Committee, consisting of senators, congressmen, and representatives from the Iowa League of Municipalities, county engineers, and the Iowa State Highway Commission. The study committee hired two consulting firms to find the physical and financial needs of the primary highway system for the next twenty years. The study committee itself held frequent meetings across the state to gather public opinions on the state of the highway system. In its final report to the 59th General Assembly, the study committee recommended:

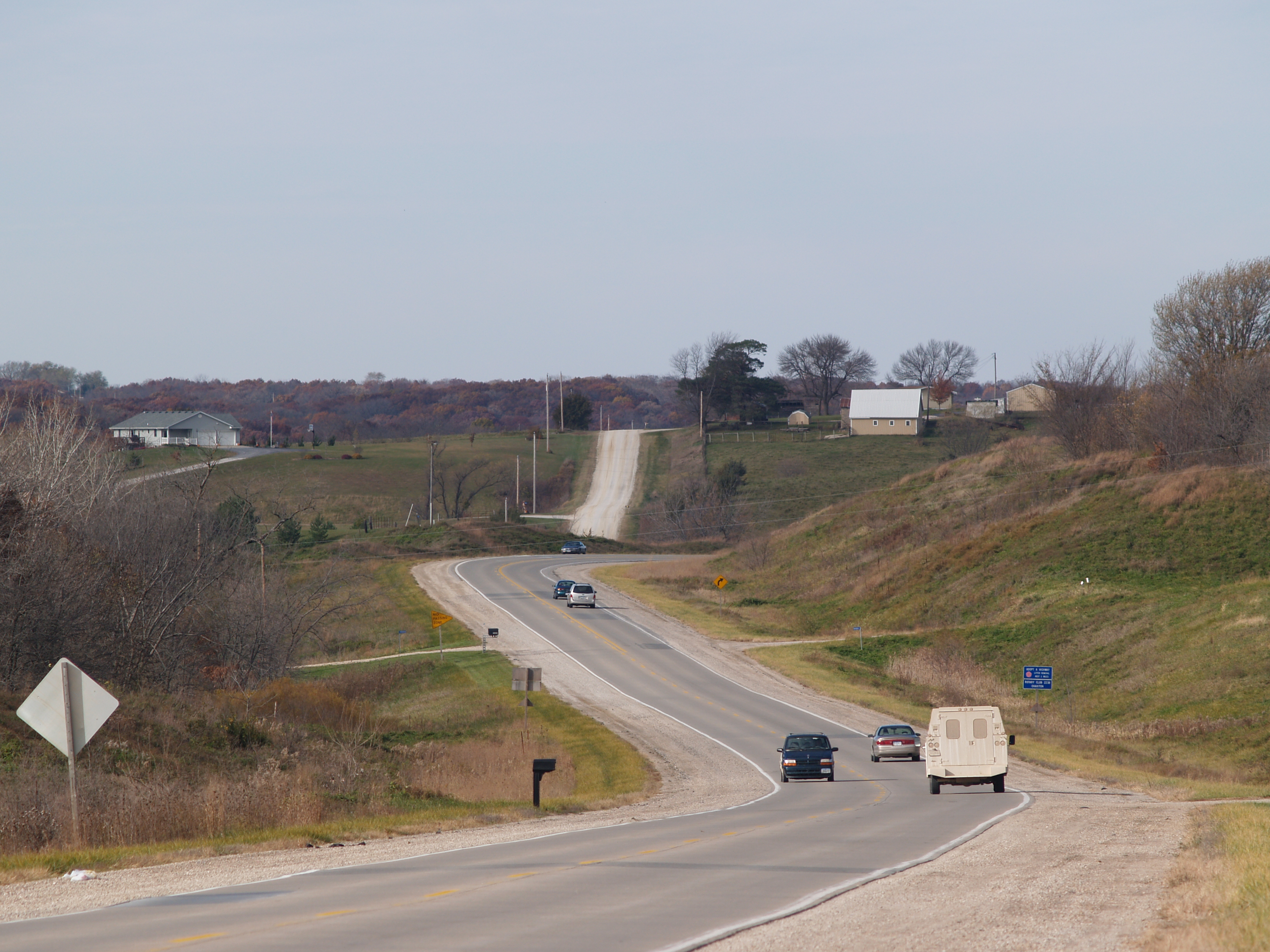
U.S. Route 34 near Chariton, a typical rural Iowa scene along Iowa's highways.

- Limiting the primary highway system to 8,400 miles (13,500 km) including extensions into municipalities.
- Transferring 1,902 miles (3,061 km) of local service highways to local jurisdictions or a separate division of primary highways.
- Classifying the primary highway system into two groups – 1,928 miles (3,103 km) of freeways and 6,472 miles (10,416 km) of other primary roads.
- Reclassifying county roads into trunk, feeder, and local secondary roads.
- Classifying municipal roads not in the primary highway system into arterials and access streets.
- Distributing 55% of the road use tax fund for use on primary roads, 30% to the counties for secondary roads, and 15% to municipalities for local roads.

The study committee urged caution on immediately adopting their report, instead recommending to adopt the findings over time. As a result, in 1980, a large number of local service primary highways were turned over to counties and local jurisdictions.

On January 1, 1969, many highways in Iowa were renumbered, largely creating the numbered routes which remain today.

=== System modernization ===
In 2002, the Road Use Tax Fund Committee (RUTF), a mix of city, county, and state transportation officials, met to review and recommend changes to Iowa's public road system. The report was necessitated by increasing costs to maintain the highway system and a level of funding that was not keeping up with the rising costs. The RUTF committee had two major recommendations:

- Transferring 712 miles (1,146 km) of primary highways to county and city governments.
- Transferring farm-to-market road extensions in cities under 500 population to the counties.

On April 17, 2003, the Iowa Senate introduced a bill, Senate File 451, which would allow the mass transfer. The bill was passed by the Senate and House and was signed by Governor Tom Vilsack on May 23, 2003. Over 600 miles (970 km) of state highways, mostly short spur routes and segments bypassed after new construction, were turned over to county or municipal governments on July 1, 2003.

Typically, when the Iowa Department of Transportation transfers a highway to a county or local jurisdiction, the DOT must ensure the highway is in good condition or provide the county compensation to repair the highway. Senate File 451, codified as Iowa Code §306.8A, instead created a fund for the maintenance of newly transferred highways. Until 2013, 1.75% of the primary highway fund will be directed to this fund to compensate counties receiving highways. Over $1.1 million has been allocated to counties for the August 2009 – July 2010 period.

Iowa has over 800 miles (1,300 km) of Interstate highways, over 3,800 miles (6,100 km) of U.S. Highways, and over 5,100 miles (8,200 km) of state highways, many of which overlap. Today, the primary highway system represents over 8% of the total 114,000-mile (183,000 km) public road miles in the state.

== Funding ==
While the Iowa Highway Commission was growing, the Iowa legislature allowed organizations to sponsor and register certain roads. Sponsors brought in much needed funds to maintain the roadways. Road sponsors were allowed to choose the colors of their road markers and slogans for road signs. The first registered route, the River-to-River Route, connected Davenport and Council Bluffs. Interstate 80 and U.S. Route 6 largely follow the River-to-River Route today. The most famous registered route was the Lincoln Highway. At the peak of the registered route system, there were over 100 registered routes in Iowa.

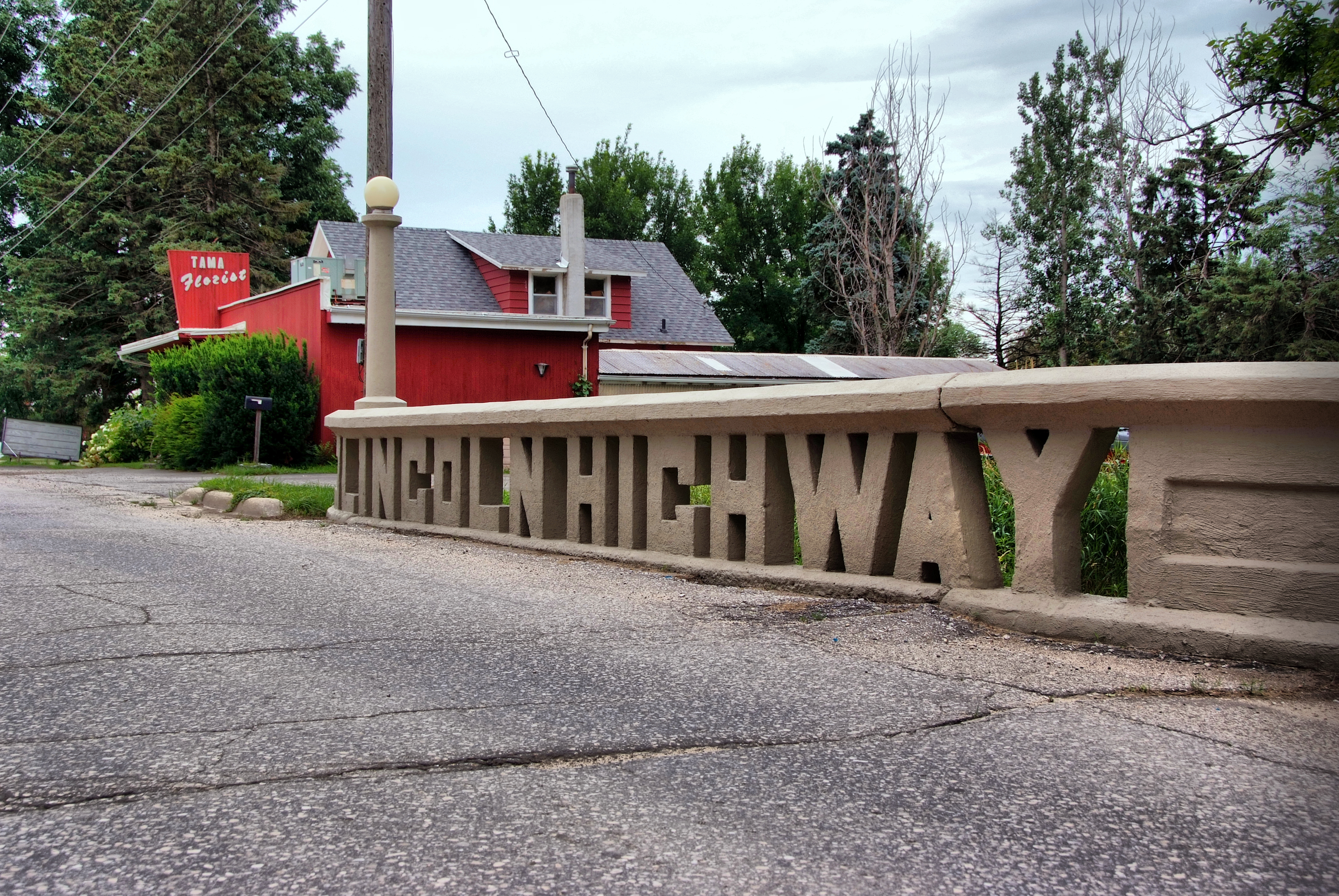
Lincoln Highway bridge in Tama

The Federal Aid Road Act of 1916 set aside $75 million over 5 years ($2.17 billion, adjusted for inflation) of which $146,000 per year ($4.22 million, adjusted for inflation) was earmarked for Iowa. The first section of hard roads build with federal money was a section between Mason City and Clear Lake, near what is now U.S. Route 18. Soon after, a massive road-paving drive began to solve Iowa's "road problem" by getting Iowa out of the mud. This created much needed jobs during the Great Depression. The paving lasted until World War II, when resources were reallocated.

In 1919, the Iowa legislature created the Primary Road Fund, which provided funding for new road projects. In addition to the Primary Road Fund, counties were allowed to issue bonds to expedite the improvement of roads. A 2-cent-per-US-gallon (0.53 ¢/L) gasoline tax (58 ¢/US gal (15 ¢/L), adjusted for inflation) was created in 1925, with one-third of revenues going into the Primary Road Fund and the other two-thirds going towards county and township roads. In 1927, in order to align the public road system with the tax revenues coming in, Iowa's public roads were divided into primary and secondary roads, with primary roads under the state's jurisdiction and secondary roads under county jurisdiction. This division remains today.

Iowa's highways are funded today through a number of sources which are distributed into the Iowa Road Use Fund. Gasoline, regular and ethanol-blend, and diesel fuel is taxed in the range of 19 to 22.5 ¢/US gal (5.0 to 5.9 ¢/L), while vehicle purchases and rentals are taxed at a rate of 5 percent. Today, the Road Use Tax Fund is distributed into funds based on classifications – 47.5% is distributed into the Primary Road Fund, 32.5% is distributed to counties through the Secondary and Farm-to-Market Road Funds, and 20% is distributed into the City Street Fund.

== Signage ==
Standard highway markers used in Iowa
Route type	1 digit	2 digits	3 digits
Interstate Highway	none
U.S. Highway
State highway
County highway	none

U.S. and Iowa highways are marked with a 24-by-24-inch (600 mm × 600 mm), or rarely, a 36-by-36-inch (900 mm × 900 mm) black sign with a white shield or white circle, respectively. To make room for additional digits, fonts are adjusted accordingly: One-digit routes use MUTCD Series D, two-digit routes use MUTCD Series C, and three-digit routes use MUTCD Series B. Additional room for numbers on three-digit routes can be created by using 10-inch (300 mm) numbers. In 2014, Iowa DOT began to use wider, 30-by-24-inch (750 mm × 600 mm) signs on three-digit-numbered highways.

Interstate Highways in Iowa are signed with, compared to current MUTCD standards, an older style blue and red shield which features smaller numbers, wider striping, and the state's name on every shield. When in use in the field, two-digit shields are 36 by 36 inches (900 mm × 900 mm), while three-digit shields are 42-by-36-inch (1,100 mm × 900 mm), and 24 by 24 inches (600 mm × 600 mm) and 30 by 25 inches (750 mm × 625 mm), respectively, on intersecting roads.

All county routes are signed with the MUTCD-standard blue pentagonal shield, however some older signs still remain.

== Secondary roads ==
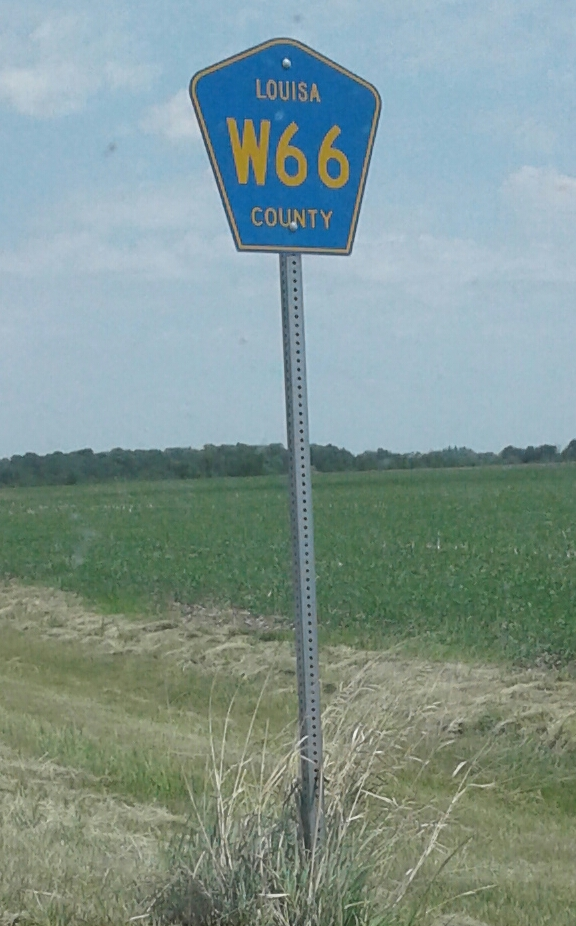
Typical signage used on a county highway in Iowa, as seen along CR W66 in Louisa County south of Cotter

Secondary roads are defined simply by the Iowa Code as those roads under county jurisdiction. The 99 counties in Iowa divide the secondary road system into farm-to-market roads and area service roads. Farm-to-market roads, which connect principal traffic generating areas to primary roads or to other farm-to-market roads, are maintained by the route's respective county and are paid for by a special fund. The Farm-to-Market Road Fund consists of federal secondary road aid and 8% of Iowa's road use taxes. The farm-to-market road system is limited to 35,000 miles (56,000 km).

Unlike some other states in the United States, Iowa's signed secondary roads are not numbered on a county-by-county basis. With exception to County Road 105, secondary roads use a uniform numbering grid using one letter and two or three numbers, e.g., E41. County roads running primarily east and west assigned letters (from north to south) A through J. County roads running primarily north and south are assigned letters (from west to east) K through Z. The letters I, O, Q and U are not used to avoid confusion with numbers and other letters.
