= List of Interstate Highways in Iowa =

Interstate Highways of the Iowa Primary Highway System
- Highway markers for I-80, I-380, and I-35 Bus. Loop
- Interstate Highways in Iowa highlighted in red

System information
- Formed: August 14, 1957

Highway names
- Interstates: Interstate X (I-X)
- Business Loops: Interstate X Business (I-X Bus.)

System links
- Iowa Primary Highway System; Interstate; US; State; Secondary; Scenic

Interstate Highways in Iowa form a network of freeways that cross the U.S. state of Iowa as part of the Interstate Highway System.

== Primary Interstates ==
Number	Length (mi)	Length (km)	Southern or western terminus	Northern or eastern terminus	Formed	Removed
I-29	151.941	244.525	I-29 at Hamburg	I-29 at Sioux City	1958	current
I-35	218.532	351.693	I-35 near Lamoni	I-35 near Albert Lea, Minn.	1958	current
I-74	5.399	8.689	I-80 at Davenport	I-74 / US 6 at Bettendorf	1968	current
I-80	306.392	493.090	I-80 at Council Bluffs	I-80 at LeClaire	1958	current

Primary Interstates

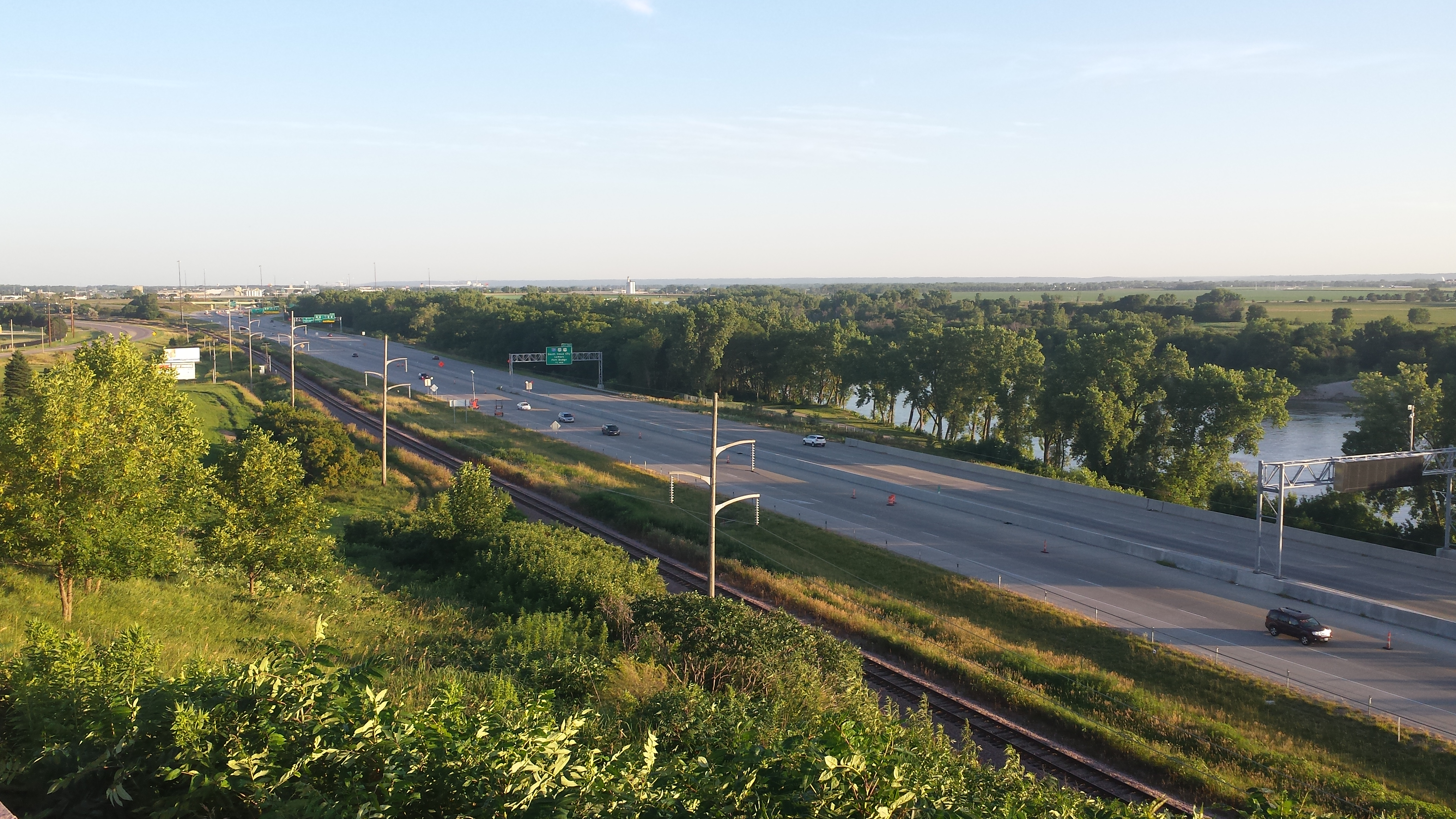
I-29 as viewed from the Sergeant Floyd Monument

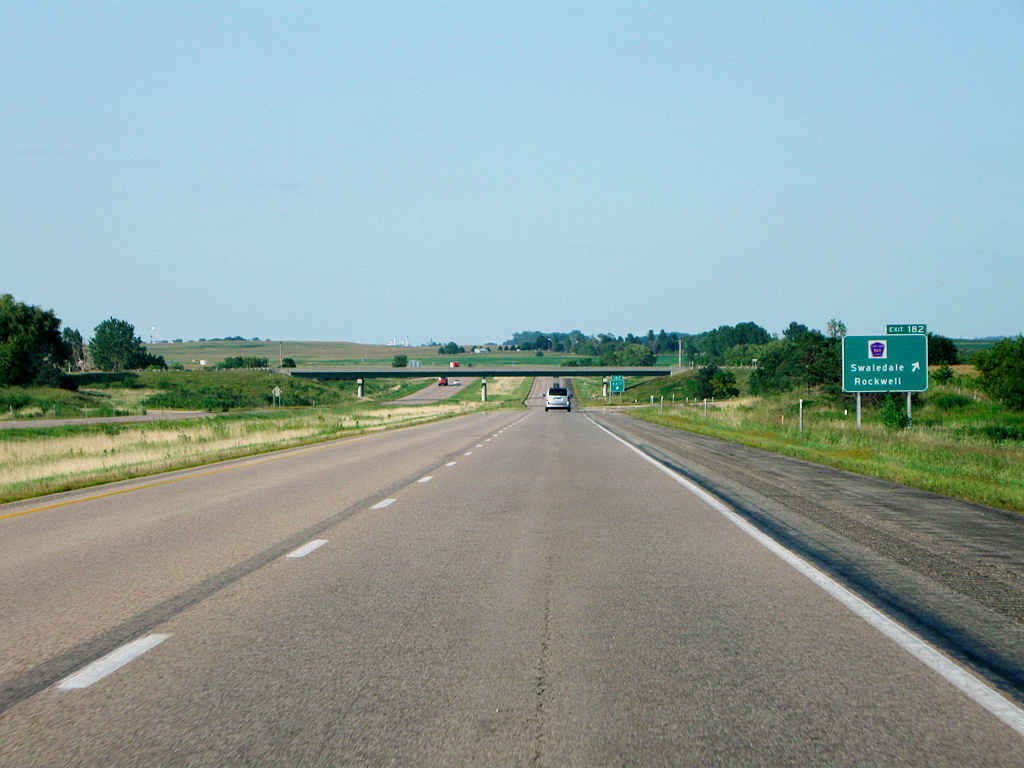
I-35 approaching exit 182

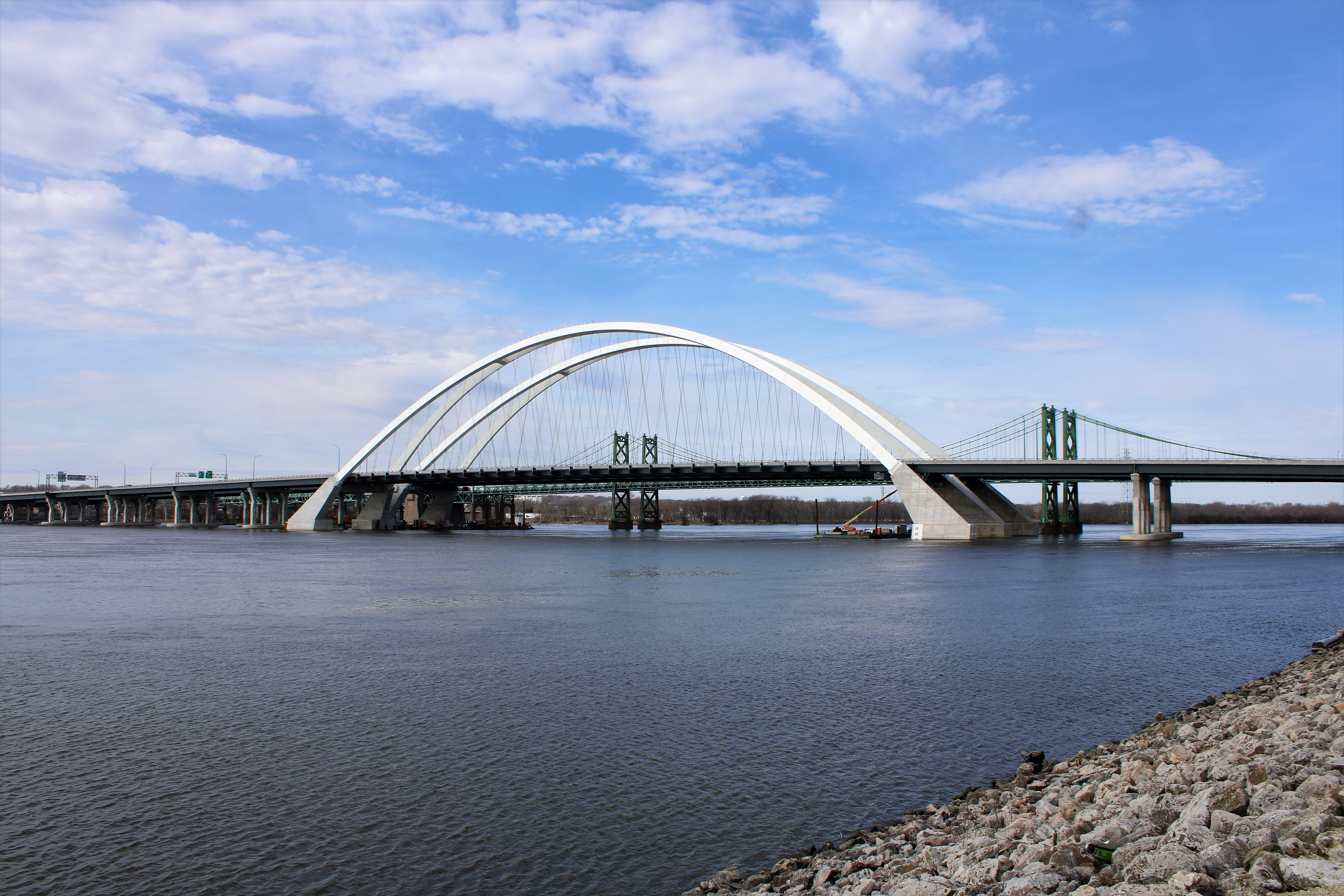
The Interstate 74 Bridge carrying I-74 across the Mississippi River

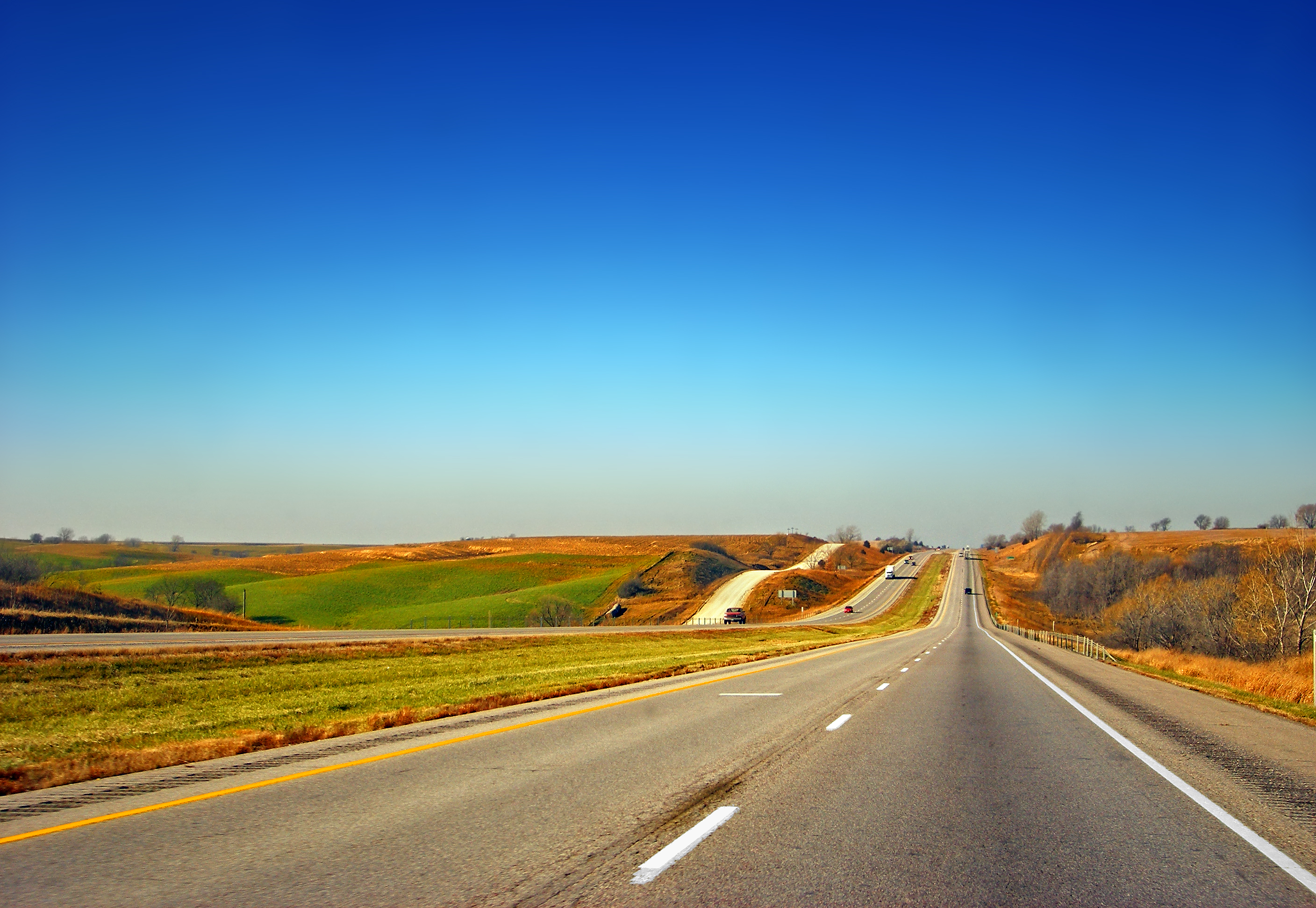
I-80 in western Iowa near Walnut

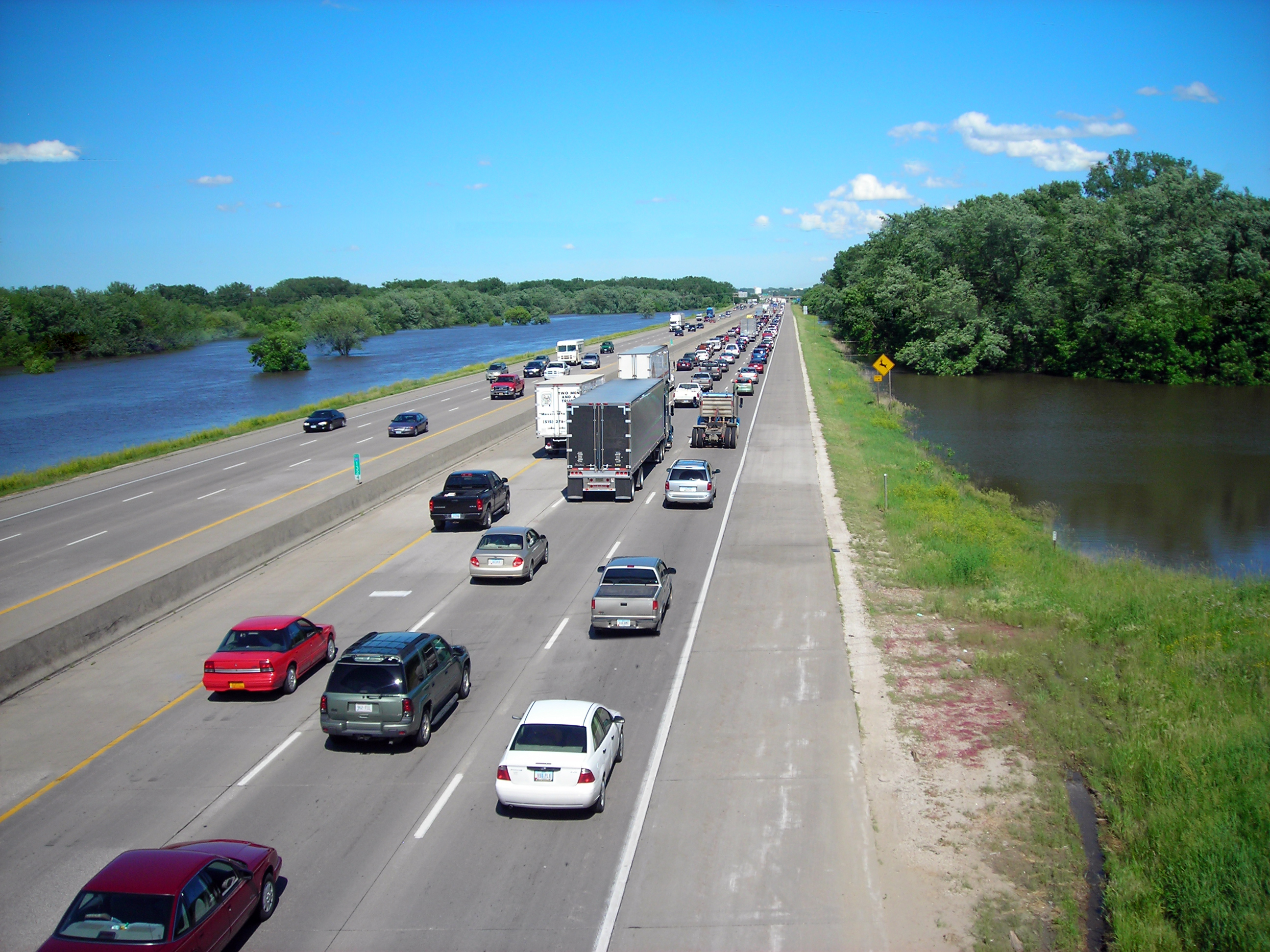
Traffic congestion on I‑35 / I‑80 during the Iowa flood of 2008

== Auxiliary Interstates ==
Number	Length (mi)	Length (km)	Southern or western terminus	Northern or eastern terminus	Formed	Removed	Notes
I-80N	17.102	27.523	I-29 at Loveland	I-80 near Neola	1966	1973	Replaced by I-680; now I-880
I-129	0.286	0.460	I-129 / US 20 / US 75 at Sioux City	I-29 / US 20 / US 75 at Sioux City	1976	current	
I-235	14.585	23.472	I-35 / I-80 at West Des Moines	I-35 / I-80 at Des Moines	1961	current	
I-280	9.862	15.871	I-80 / US 6 at Davenport	I-280 at Rock Island, Ill.	1973	current	
I-380	72.969	117.432	I-80 / U.S. Route 218 / Iowa 27 near Coralville	US 218 at Waterloo	1973	current	
I-480	0.877	1.411	I-480 / US 6 at Council Bluffs	I-29 / US 6 at Council Bluffs	1966	current	Fully concurrent with US 6
I-680	3.353	5.396	I-680 at Omaha, Neb.	I-29 near Crescent	1966	current	
I-880	17.102	27.523	I-29 at Loveland	I-80 near Neola	2019	current	Replaced a portion of I-680
Former

Auxiliary Interstates

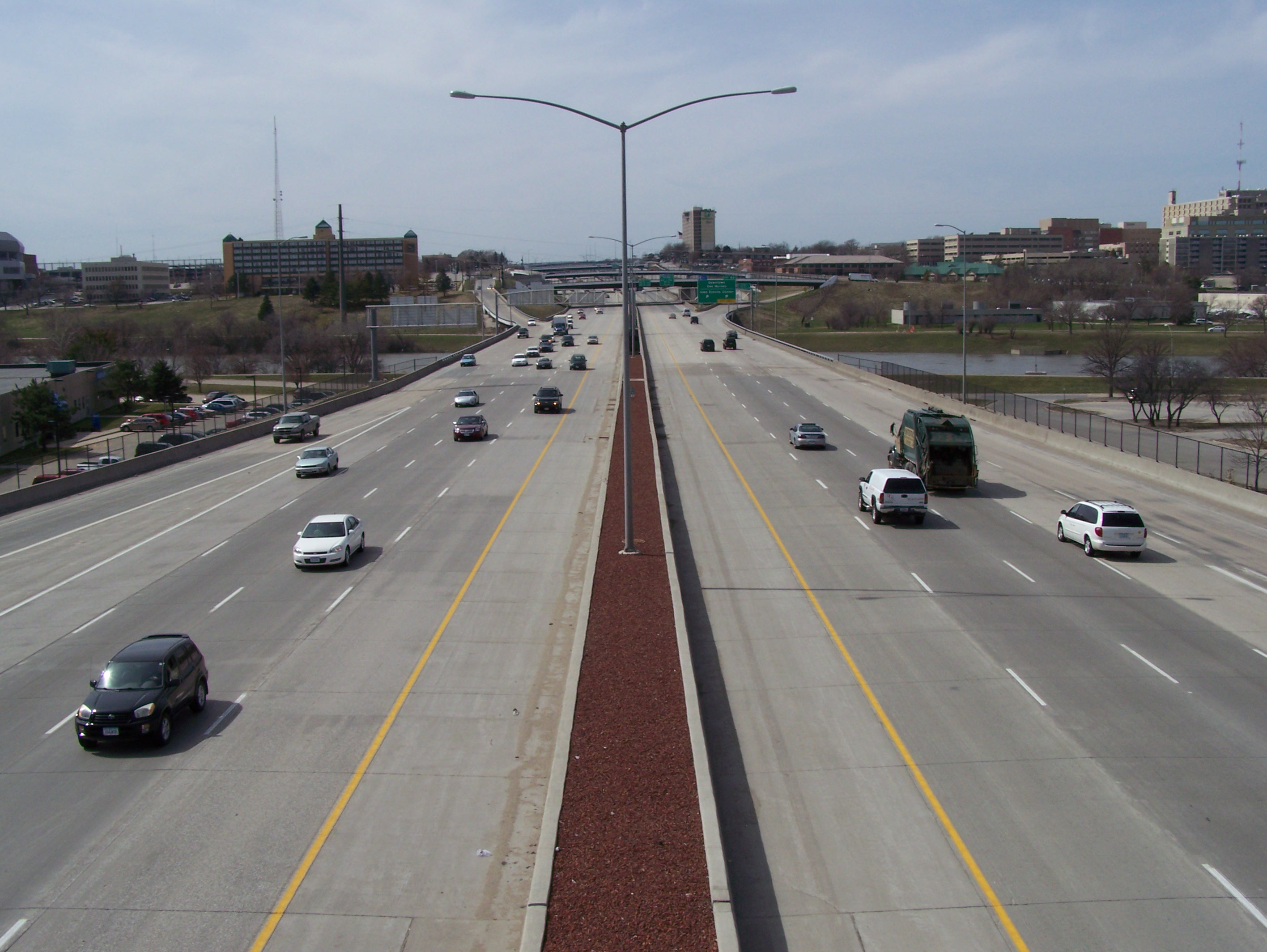
I‑235 crossing the Des Moines River in Des Moines, Iowa

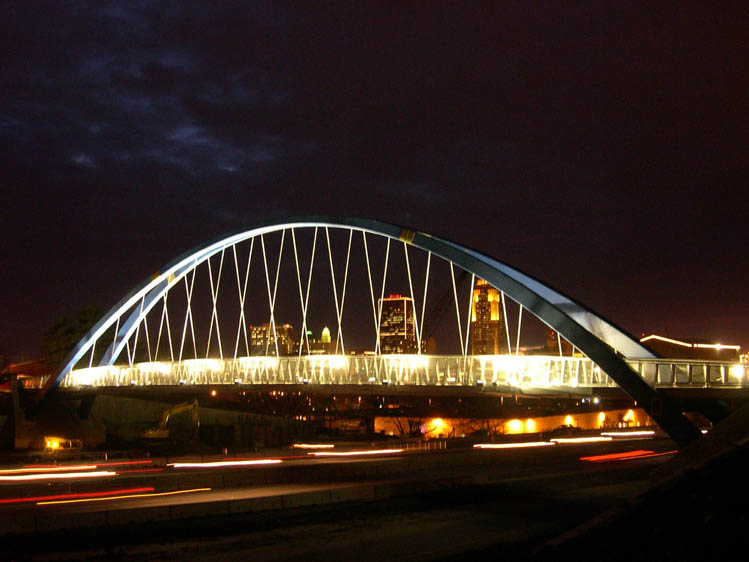
The Edna M. Griffin Memorial Bridge carrying I‑235 across the Des Moines River

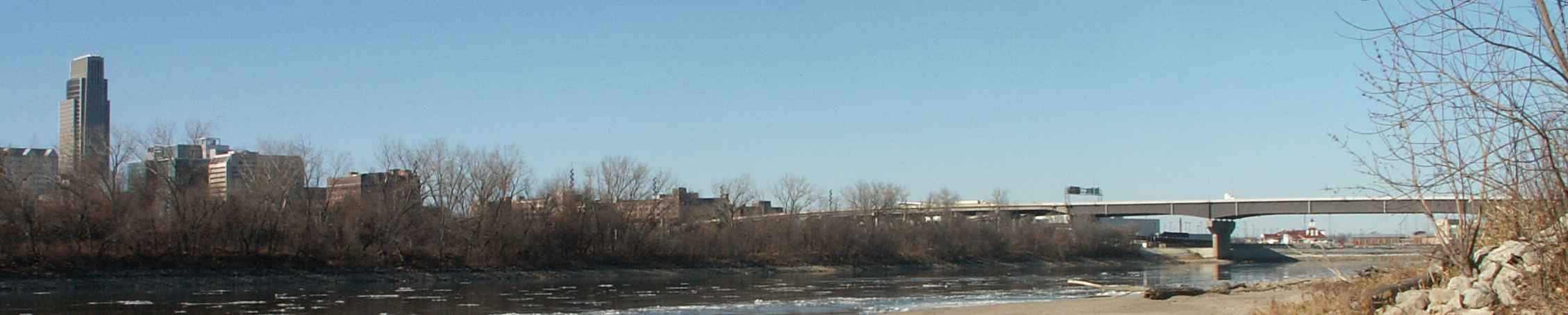
The I‑480 bridge over the Missouri River between Council Bluffs, Iowa and Downtown Omaha, Nebraska

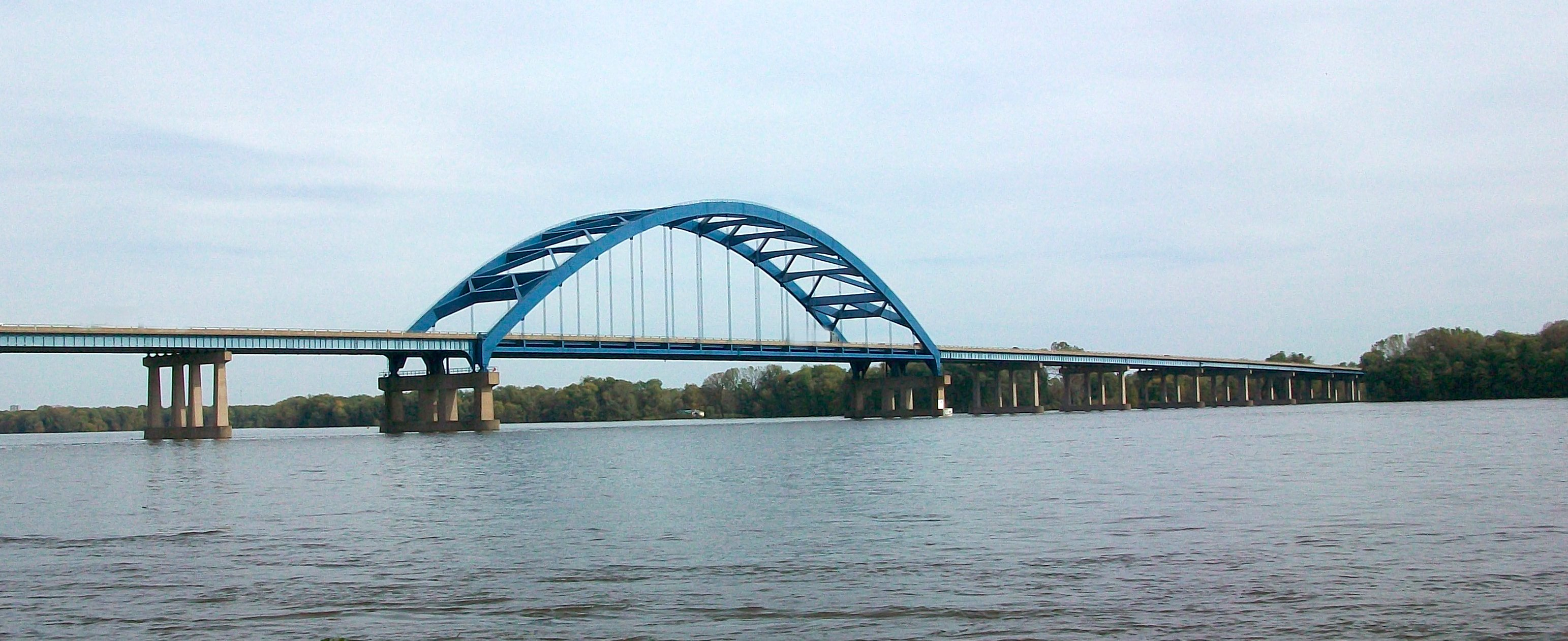
I‑280 crosses the Mississippi River over the Baker Bridge.

== Business routes ==
Number	Length (mi)	Length (km)	Southern or western terminus	Northern or eastern terminus	Cities	Formed	Removed
I-35 Business Loop	6.927	11.148	I-35 / US 30 in Ames	I-35 in Ames	Ames	1995	current
I-35 Business Loop	2.979	4.794	I-35 / US 18 in Clear Lake	I-35 / US 18 / Iowa 122 in Clear Lake	Clear Lake	1999	current
