= List of Iowa Scenic Byways =

Iowa Scenic Byways

Highway names
- Interstates: Interstate X (I-X)
- US Highways: U.S. Highway X (US X)
- State: Iowa X

System links
- Iowa Primary Highway System; Interstate; US; State; Secondary; Scenic

There are fourteen Iowa Byways in the U.S. state of Iowa. Two are also designated as National Scenic Byways.

== National Scenic Byways ==
| Name | Length (mi) | Length (km) | Notes |
|---|---|---|---|
| Lincoln Highway Heritage Byway | 372 | 599 | |
| Loess Hills Scenic Byway | 220.0 | 354.1 | |
| Great River Road | 2,069 | 3,330 | Routing |

== Iowa scenic byways ==
| Name | Length (mi) | Length (km) | Notes |
|---|---|---|---|
| Covered Bridges Scenic Byway | 82 | 132 | |
| Delaware Crossing Scenic Byway | 44 | 71 | |
| Driftless Area Scenic Byway | 100 | 160 | |
| Glacial Trail Scenic Byway | 36 | 58 | |
| Grant Wood Scenic Byway | 68 | 109 | |
| Historic Hills Scenic Byway | 110 | 180 | |
| Iowa Valley Scenic Byway | 77 | 124 | |
| Jefferson Highway Heritage Byway | 220 | 350 | |
| River Bluffs Scenic Byway | 109 | 175 | |
| Western Skies Scenic Byway | 142 | 229 | |
| White Pole Scenic Byway | 26 | 42 | |
