= Iowa Department of Transportation =

Agency in the US state of Iowa

- Seal

- Iowa DOT logo

Agency overview
- Formed: April 13, 1904; 122 years ago
- Preceding agency: Iowa State Highway Commission
- Jurisdiction: State of Iowa
- Headquarters: 800 Lincoln Way Ames, Iowa; 42°01′19″N 93°37′19″W
- Employees: 3,061 (October 2010)
- Agency executives: Nancy Maher, Chair, Iowa Transportation Commission; Scott Marler, Director
- Key document: Iowa Administrative Code
- Website: iowadot.gov

The Iowa Department of Transportation (Iowa DOT) is the government organization in the U.S. state of Iowa responsible for the organization, construction, and maintenance of the primary highway system. Located in Ames, Iowa, DOT is also responsible for licensing drivers and programming and planning for aviation, rail, and public transit.

The organization was created in 1904 as the Iowa State Highway Commission, an extension of Iowa State College in Ames. In 1913, the commission was spun off from the college and became a government organization. In 1974, the highway commission was folded into a larger transportation department with other modes of transportation.

== Organization ==
=== Transportation Commission ===
The decision-making body of the Iowa DOT is the Iowa Transportation Commission. Seven people, of whom no more than four people can represent the same political party, make up the commission. Each member of the commission is nominated by the governor and confirmed by the senate for a four-year term. Each year, the commission creates a comprehensive transportation plan which identifies the transportation needs and creates programs to meet those needs. In addition, the commission promotes the coordinated and efficient use of all modes of transportation that are available, including public transportation, which benefit the state and Iowans.

=== Director ===
The Iowa DOT is administered by the director, currently Scott Marler. The director is appointed by the governor to serve as the chief administrative officer of the department. Reporting to the director are the deputy director, the bureau of policy and information, the bureau of transportation safety, the bureau of management, the general counsel division, and the divisions listed below. The director's duties are chiefly administrative, but does have an important role in government. The director works with the commission to create transportation policy and transportation plans. By December 31, the director must present the next year's budget to the commission of their approval. By January 15, the director must submit a report to the Iowa General Assembly "describing the prior fiscal year's highway construction program, actual expenditures of the program, and contractual obligations of the program."

=== Divisions ===
==== Highway division ====
The highway division is the most visible division in the Iowa DOT. The division is responsible for designing highways, acquiring rights of way, building and maintaining the interstate and primary highway systems. It is divided into six regional districts, each of which responsible for building and maintaining state roads in each respective area of the state. It also issues weather and traffic alerts via the internet.

==== Planning, programming, and modal division ====
The planning, programming, and modal division is an umbrella group which houses the other modes of transportation. The planning and research division is responsible for compiling statistical transportation data and assessing the financial impacts of legislation and programs upon the state.

==== Motor vehicle division ====
The motor vehicle division is responsible for licensing drivers, including commercial and chauffeur's licenses. The division regulates height and weight restrictions and handles licensing and titling for all vehicles.

=== Districts ===
Iowa DOT districts map

Iowa is divided into six transportation districts:

| District | Headquarters | Counties |
|---|---|---|
| 1 | Ames | Boone, Greene, Grundy, Hamilton, Hardin, Jasper, Marshall, Polk, Poweshiek, Story, Tama, and Webster |
| 2 | Mason City | Allamakee, Black Hawk, Bremer, Butler, Cerro Gordo, Chickasaw, Clayton, Fayette, Floyd, Franklin, Hancock, Howard, Humboldt, Kossuth, Mitchell, Winnebago, Winneshiek, Worth, and Wright |
| 3 | Sioux City | Buena Vista, Calhoun, Carroll, Cherokee, Clay, Crawford, Dickinson, Emmet, Ida, Lyon, Monona, O'Brien, Osceola, Palo Alto, Plymouth, Pocahontas, Sac, Sioux, and Woodbury |
| 4 | Atlantic | Adair, Adams, Audubon, Cass, Dallas, Fremont, Guthrie, Harrison, Madison, Mills, Montgomery, Page, Pottawattamie, Ringold, Shelby, Taylor, and Union |
| 5 | Fairfield | Appanoose, Clarke, Davis, Decatur, Des Moines, Henry, Jefferson, Keokuk, Lee, Louisa, Lucas, Mahaska, Marion, Monroe, Muscatine, Van Buren, Wapello, Warren, Washington, and Wayne |
| 6 | Cedar Rapids | Benton, Buchanan, Cedar, Clinton, Delaware, Dubuque, Iowa, Jackson, Johnson, Jones, Linn, and Scott |

== History ==
In 1904, the Iowa General Assembly passed an act which created the Iowa State Highway Commission (IHC). Originally, the IHC was a part of Iowa State College where engineering dean Anson Marston was the first highway commissioner. The commission had a biennial budget of $7,000 ($250,800, adjusted for inflation). The commission's first home was in Engineering Hall at ISC, known today as Marston Hall. The IHC's first task was to study Iowa's problematic roads; at the time, less than 2% of which had been improved with gravel or broken stones. While Iowa's dirt roads were fine roads when dry, they were impassibly muddy when wet. This work was done by the staff which included H.M. Bainer, J.T. Hoover and Thomas Harris MacDonald (who later became Commissioner of Public Roads for the Federal Government. For the next ten years, the commission served as an information agency, showing county supervisors the best ways to build and construct roads.

In 1913, the Iowa State Highway Commission was spun off from Iowa State College. The newly independent IHC's first task was to eliminate the price gouging that was occurring across the state. Private supply and bridge companies had divided the state into monopolistic areas where they could charge the county boards of supervisors unusually high prices for needed supplies. The commission was also given supervisory control over the public road system, although each county was still in charge of managing their road system.

In 1974, the 65th Iowa General Assembly reorganized the highway commission into a larger Department of Transportation with other modes of transportation. The larger department was an effort to create a more balanced transportation system.

== See also ==
- List of state highways in Iowa
- Outline of Iowa
- U.S. Department of Transportation
- Vehicle registration plates of Iowa
