= National Register of Historic Places listings in Delaware County, Iowa =

Location of Delaware County in Iowa

This is a list of the National Register of Historic Places listings in Delaware County, Iowa.

This is intended to be a complete list of the properties and districts on the National Register of Historic Places in Delaware County, Iowa, United States. Latitude and longitude coordinates are provided for many National Register properties and districts; these locations may be seen together in a map.

There are 14 properties and districts listed on the National Register in the county. One additional property was once listed but has since been removed.

This National Park Service list is complete through NPS recent listings posted April 24, 2026.

== Current listings ==
	Name on the Register	Image	Date listed	Location	City or town	Description
1	Backbone State Park Historic District		December 23, 1991 (#91001842)	Junction of County Roads C57 and W69; 42°36′50″N 91°33′13″W	Strawberry Point	
2	Backbone State Park, Cabin-Bathing Area (Area A)		November 15, 1990 (#90001681)	Junction of County Roads C54 and W69; 42°36′20″N 91°32′21″W	Dundee	
3	Backbone State Park, Picnicking, Hiking & Camping Area (Area B)	Backbone State Park, Picnicking, Hiking & Camping Area (Area B)	November 15, 1990 (#90001682)	Junction of County Roads C54 and W69; 42°36′55″N 91°33′42″W	Dundee	
4	Backbone State Park, Richmond Springs (Area C)	Backbone State Park, Richmond Springs (Area C)	November 15, 1990 (#90001683)	Junction of County Roads C54 and W69; 42°38′15″N 91°33′26″W	Dundee	
5	Bay Settlement Church and Monument	Bay Settlement Church and Monument	September 13, 1977 (#77000506)	Southwest of Delhi; 42°23′32″N 91°22′37″W	Delhi	
6	Delaware County Courthouse	Delaware County Courthouse	July 2, 1981 (#81000234)	Main St. 42°29′02″N 91°26′34″W	Manchester	
7	J.J. Hoag House	J.J. Hoag House	August 13, 1976 (#76000760)	120 E. Union St. 42°29′14″N 91°27′30″W	Manchester	
8	Robert Kirkpatrick Round Barn	Robert Kirkpatrick Round Barn	April 6, 2005 (#05000252)	3342-120th Ave. 42°17′55″N 91°33′29″W	Coggon	
9	Lincoln Elementary School	Lincoln Elementary School	October 24, 2002 (#02001243)	401 Lincoln St. 42°28′40″N 91°27′45″W	Manchester	
10	McGee School	McGee School	October 14, 1999 (#99001251)	Junction of 197th and 145th Aves. 42°30′07″N 91°31′06″W	Manchester	
11	Old Lenox College	Old Lenox College	December 19, 1974 (#74000781)	College St. 42°20′55″N 91°14′39″W	Hopkinton	As of 2011 is used as part of the Delaware County, Iowa Historical Museum Complex
12	Saints Peter and Paul Church	Saints Peter and Paul Church	January 24, 1995 (#94001589)	Junction of C64 and X47; 42°33′18″N 91°12′51″W	Petersburg	
13	Spring Branch Butter Factory Site		June 28, 1974 (#74000782)	Address Restricted	Manchester	
14	Ruth Suckow House	Ruth Suckow House	December 23, 1977 (#77000507)	S. Radcliffe and 5th St. 42°28′54″N 91°16′07″W	Earlville	

== Former listings ==
	Name on the Register	Image	Date listed	Date removed	Location	City or town	Description
1	Coffin's Grove Stagecoach House	Coffin's Grove Stagecoach House	February 20, 1975 (#75000681)	August 15, 2018	3 miles west of Manchester; 42°30′01″N 91°32′31″W	Manchester	

== See also ==
- List of National Historic Landmarks in Iowa
- National Register of Historic Places listings in Iowa
- Listings in neighboring counties: Buchanan, Clayton, Dubuque, Fayette, Jones, Linn
