= Benton County Courthouse (Iowa) =

- U.S. National Register of Historic Places
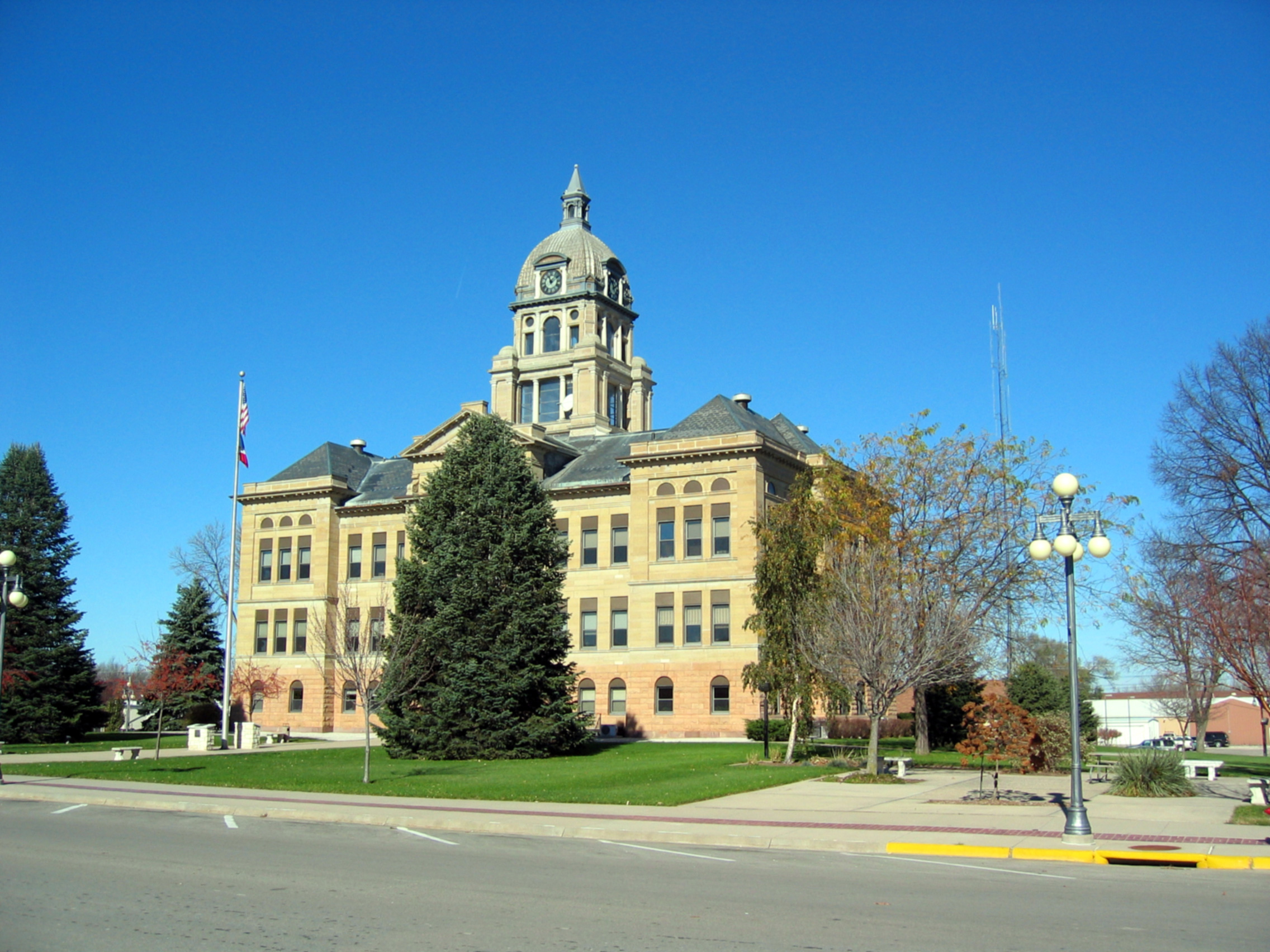

- Location within Iowa Location within the United States
- Interactive map showing the location for Benton County Courthouse
- Location: E. 4th St. Vinton, Iowa
- Coordinates: 42°10′5″N 92°1′25″W
- Area: less than one acre
- Built: 1906
- Built by: George Rickman & Sons
- Architect: Bell & Detweiler
- Architectural style: Beaux Arts
- MPS: County Courthouses in Iowa TR
- NRHP reference No.: 76000733
- Added to NRHP: October 8, 1976

The Benton County Courthouse, located in Vinton, Iowa, United States, was built in 1906. It was listed on the National Register of Historic Places in 1976 as a part of the County Courthouses in Iowa Thematic Resource. The courthouse is the fourth building the county has used for court functions and county administration.

== History ==
Benton County's first courthouse was a log structure, but it did not have a roof or floor when they started to use it. The court met in a log home during inclement weather. Because of a dispute over the location of the county seat, the second courthouse stood unfinished until 1852 when the main floor of the frame structure was finished to provide space for a courtroom. County officers occupied two rooms in the unfinished second floor before the building was destroyed by fire the following year.

The county records were rescued by three men, one of whom died as a result of his injuries in the fire. The county's third courthouse was built at a cost of $13,000 and dedicated in December 1856. The two-story Federal-style brick building was capped with an octagon-shaped cupola. The second and third courthouses occupied the same location as the present courthouse. The cornerstone for it was laid on October 14, 1905, and it was completed in 1906 for $105,000.

== Architecture ==
Designed by Bell & Detweiler of Minneapolis, the present courthouse was built by George Rickman & Sons. A simplified version of the Beaux Arts style, the building features a 112-foot (34 m) central tower, which makes it one of the local community's most prominent landmarks. It contains a four-faced illuminated clock, a 1,500-pound (680 kg) B-flat bell, and it is topped with a dome.

The two-story structure sits on a raised basement, and is made up of a central pavilion that is flanked by two side pavilions. The basement level of the building is composed of rusticated Kettle River sandstone while the upper two floors are clad in Buckeye gray sandstone. Beside the central tower, the central pavilion contains the only decorative elements of the building, which are found in its round-arch window and its pilasters.

This would be the last of six nearly identical courthouses Charles E. Bell had a hand in designing, along with the Berrien County courthouse in St. Joseph, Michigan (1895, demolished), the Fulton County Courthouse in Lewistown, Illinois (1897), the Deer Lodge County Courthouse in Anaconda, Montana (1898), the Cass County Courthouse in Fargo, North Dakota (1904), and the Yellowstone County courthouse in Billings, Montana (1905, demolished).
