= Cass County Court House, Jail, and Sheriff's House =

Historic house in North Dakota, United States

- U.S. National Register of Historic Places
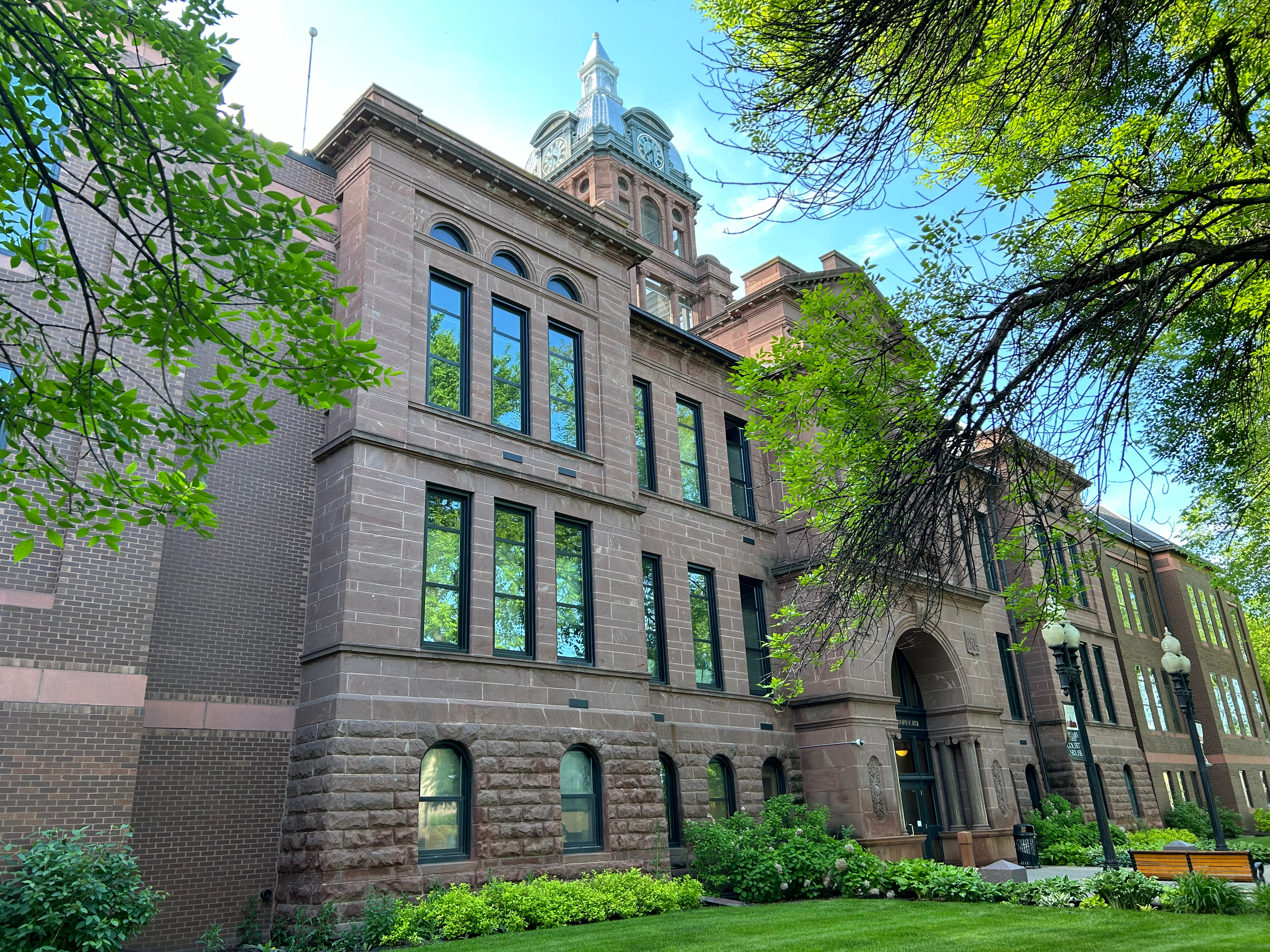

- Location within North Dakota Location within the United States
- Location: S. 9th St. between S. 2nd and 3rd Aves., Fargo, North Dakota
- Coordinates: 46°52′19″N 96°47′35″W
- Area: less than 1 acre (0.40 ha)
- Built: 1904
- Architect: Charles E. Bell
- Architectural style: Late 19th and 20th Century Revivals
- MPS: North Dakota County Courthouses TR (AD)
- NRHP reference No.: 83004062
- Added to NRHP: December 22, 1983

Cass County Court House, Jail, and Sheriff's House is a property in Fargo, North Dakota that was listed on the National Register of Historic Places in 1983.

It was built in 1904 in Late 19th and 20th Century Revivals architecture style, and was designed by architect Charles E. Bell. It was the fourth of six identical courthouses Bell had a hand in designing, along with the Berrien County courthouse in St. Joseph, Michigan (1895, demolished), the Fulton County Courthouse in Lewistown, Illinois (1897), the Deer Lodge County Courthouse in Anaconda, Montana (1898), the Yellowstone County courthouse in Billings, Montana (1905, demolished) and the Benton County Courthouse in Vinton, Iowa (1906).

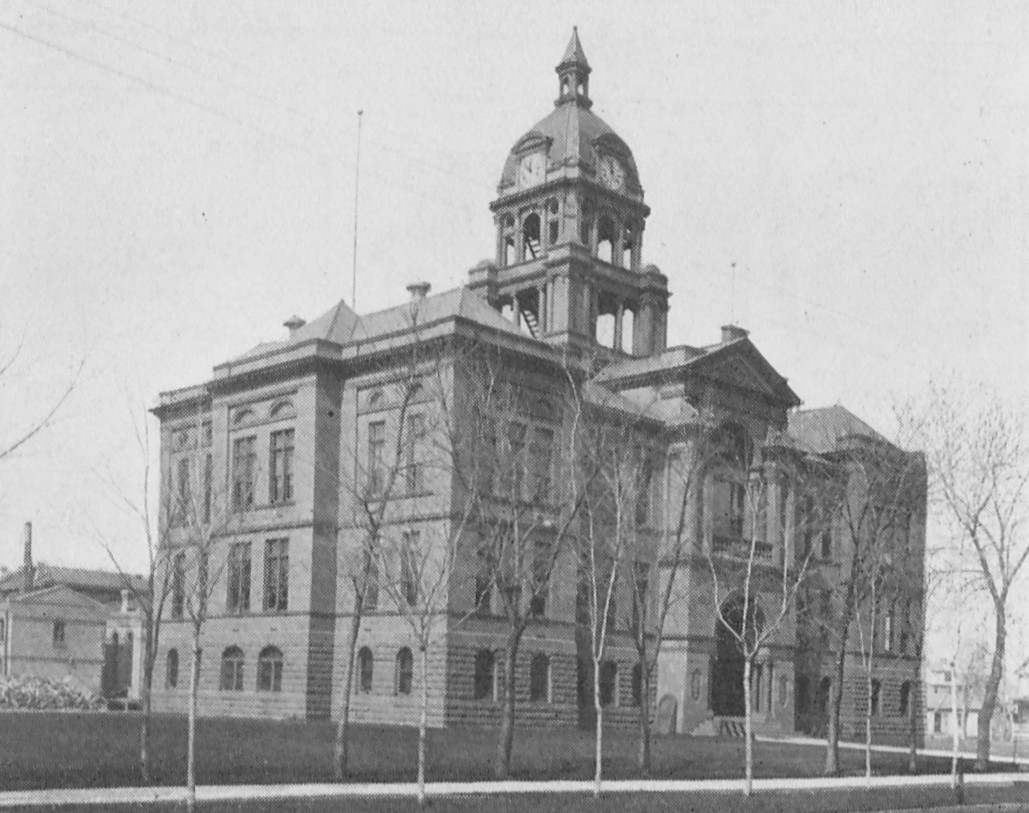
Cass County Courthouse, Fargo, N.D., circa 1910

The listing included three contributing buildings on an area of less than 1 acre (0.40 ha).

Its buildings served historically as a courthouse, as a correctional facility, and as a single dwelling.

The courthouse "is significant architecturally as Fargo's premier example of Renaissance Revival style architecture".

The property was covered in a study of North Dakota county courthouses.
