= George Floyd protests in South Dakota =

Civil unrest in 2020 following the murder of George Floyd

- Part of George Floyd protests
- Date: May 29 – June 10, 2020 (1 week and 5 days)
- Location: South Dakota, United States
- Caused by: Police brutality; Institutional racism against African Americans; Reaction to the murder of George Floyd; Economic, racial and social inequality

This is a list of protests in South Dakota related to the murder of George Floyd.

== Locations ==
=== Aberdeen ===
On June 1, on both sides of Sixth Avenue Southeast, over 50 protesters gathered to protest the murder of George Floyd.

=== Brookings ===
Hundreds of people marched on June 5, 2020, in a demonstration to support Justice for Black Lives. The protest travelled throughout various government buildings downtown, including the courthouse, post office, and police department. The Brookings Police were supportive and closed intersections for the demonstration.

=== Huron ===
On June 10, over 100 vehicles took part in a "Drive for George Floyd," parading through the streets of Huron with slogans supporting Floyd and Black Lives Matter.

=== Mitchell ===
On June 3, 2020, a crowd of peaceful demonstrators marched through downtown Mitchell in solidarity of social justice change for the African American community.

=== Pierre ===
On June 1, a group of protesters peacefully demonstrated outside the South Dakota State Capitol for approximately five hours.

=== Pine Ridge ===
A small group, including two law enforcement officials, joined for a protest on June 4, 2020.

=== Rapid City ===
George Floyd's uncle Selwyn Jones spoke at an event held at Memorial Park on May 29. He said his nephew was "always smiling and laughing.” The rally ended with a performance by Native American musicians. The Chief of Police expressed regrets that he could not attend the memorial. On June 3, a small group protesters gathered in Rapid City, waving flags and holding signs in support of Black Lives Matter and George Floyd.

=== Sioux Falls ===
A protest march was held in downtown Sioux Falls on May 31, ending outside the Sioux Falls and Minnehaha County Law Enforcement Center. George Floyd's uncle thanked the protesters for honoring his nephew. The event organizers for the downtown event emphasized nonviolence to honor Floyd. However, some rioters later traveled to Sioux Empire Mall, where they threw rocks through windows. Some protesters asked the rock throwers to stop and even formed a line in front of the police to quell the actions against police, but without success. Gov. Kristi Noem declared a state of emergency, from 10pm on May 31, to 7am on June 1. Seventy members of the National Guard were activated. SWAT and National Guard teams then assisted in enforcing curfew, but rioting and looting continued at the mall and other nearby stores.

=== Watertown ===
On June 6, around 300 protesters peacefully marched from Diamondball Park to the Codington County Courthouse to support Black Lives Matter and George Floyd.
