= Fulton County Courthouse =

Fulton County Courthouse may refer to:

- Fulton County Courthouse (Georgia), listed on the National Register of Historic Places (NRHP)
- Fulton County Courthouse (Illinois)
- Fulton County Courthouse (Indiana), listed on the NRHP
- Fulton County Courthouse (Kentucky), NRHP-listed in Fulton County
- Fulton County Courthouse (New York), NRHP-listed
- Fulton County Courthouse (Ohio), listed on the NRHP
- Fulton County Courthouse (Pennsylvania), in the McConnellsburg Historic District listed on the NRHP
