= Aukes =

Aukes is a surname. Notable people with the surname include:

- Rachel Aukes, American novelist
- Douwe Aukes (1612–1668), Frisian sea captain
