= Grant County Courthouse (South Dakota) =

- U.S. National Register of Historic Places
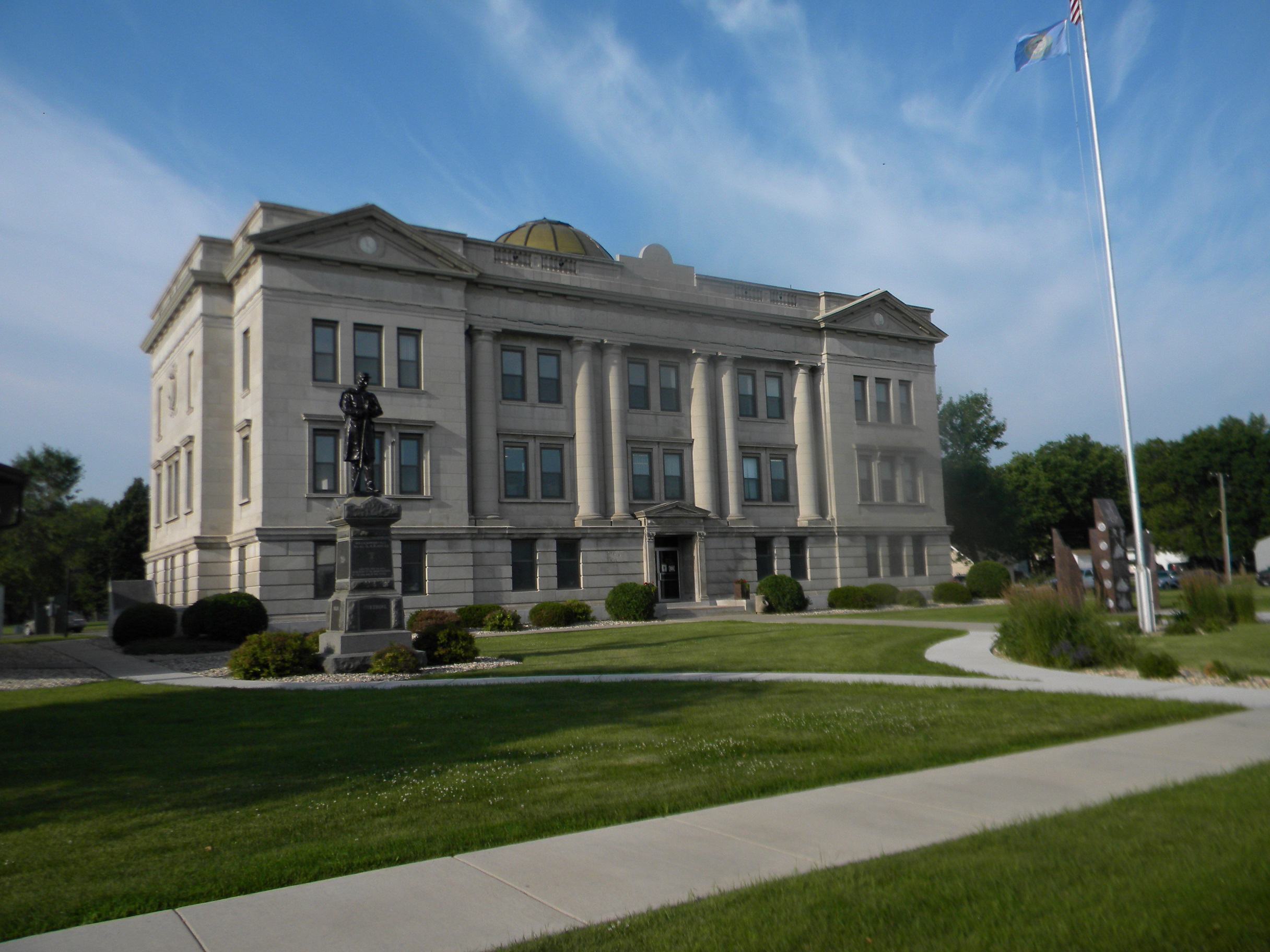

- Location within South Dakota Location within the United States
- Interactive map showing the location of Grant County Courthouse
- Location: Park Ave. and Main St., Milbank, South Dakota
- Coordinates: 45°13′3″N 96°38′8″W
- Built: 1915
- Architect: Bell & Bentley
- Architectural style: Classical Revival
- MPS: County Courthouses of South Dakota MPS
- NRHP reference No.: 92001858
- Added to NRHP: February 10, 1993

The Grant County Courthouse is an historic building located at Park Avenue and Main Street in Milbank, South Dakota. It was built in 1915 in the Classical Revival style and was designed by architects Bell & Bentley of Minneapolis, who also designed the South Dakota State Capitol in Pierre.

On February 10, 1993, it was added to the National Register of Historic Places.
