= Charles E. Bell =

American architect (1858–1932)

Charles Emlen Bell
- Born: March 31, 1858; McLean County, Illinois, U.S.
- Died: May 10, 1932 (aged 74); Minneapolis, Minnesota, U.S.
- Resting place: Lakewood Cemetery
- Education: Educated at West Town Boarding School, Philadelphia, Pennsylvania
- Occupation: Architect
- Known for: Architectural contributions in Iowa, Montana, and Minnesota
- Spouse: Helen Louise "Nellie" Wickham (m. 1880)

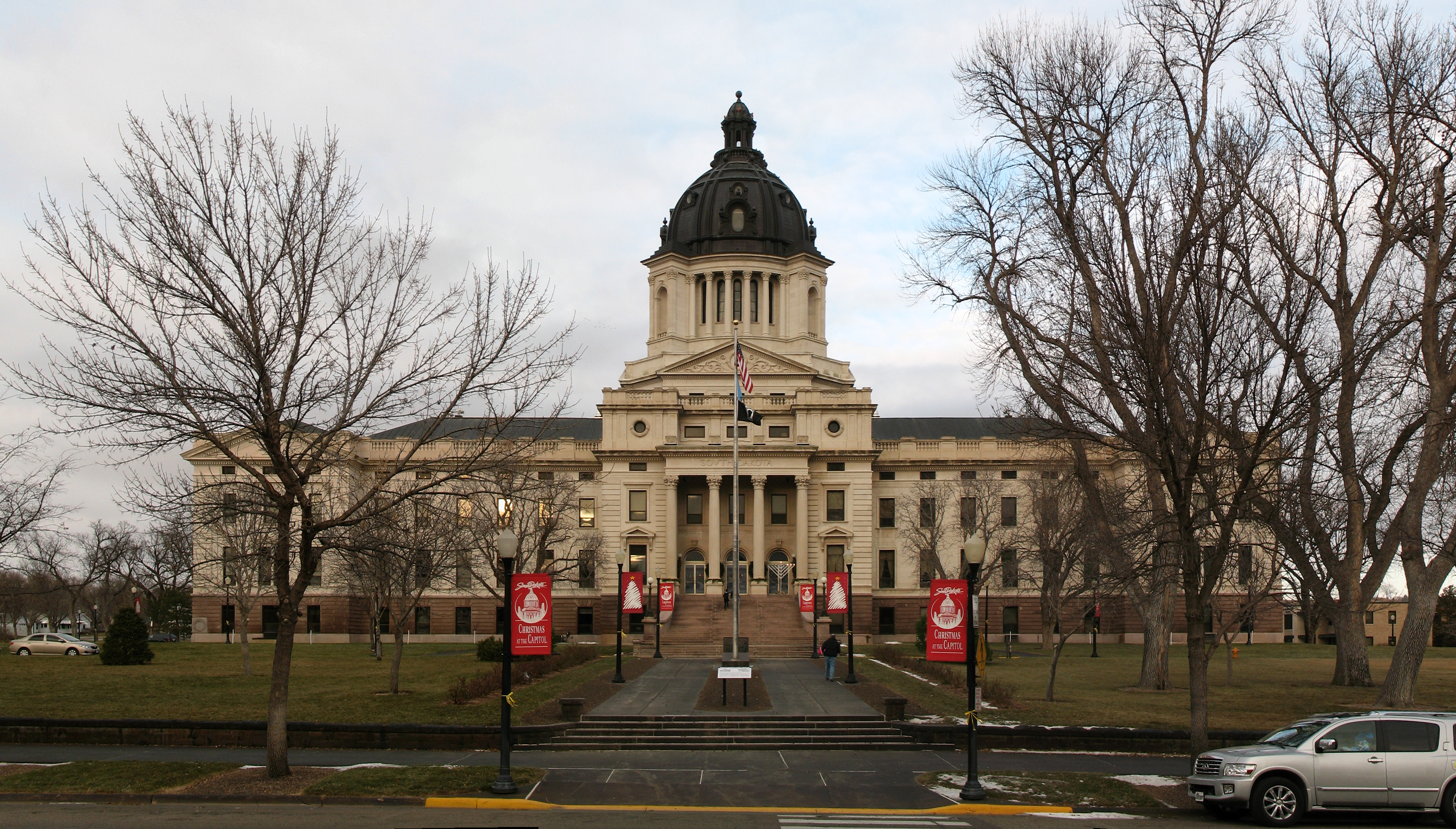
South Dakota State Capitol

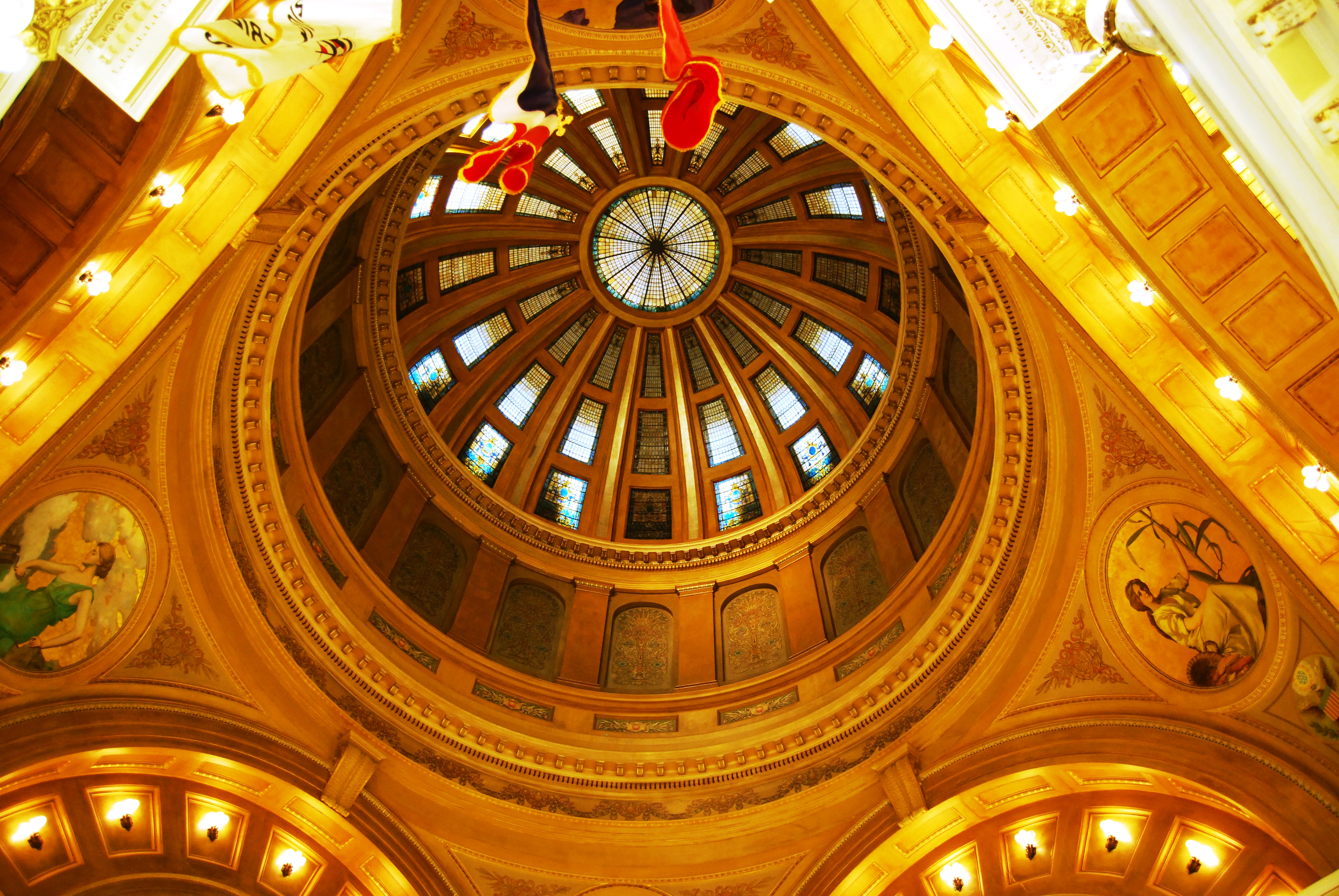
Rotunda of the South Dakota State Capitol

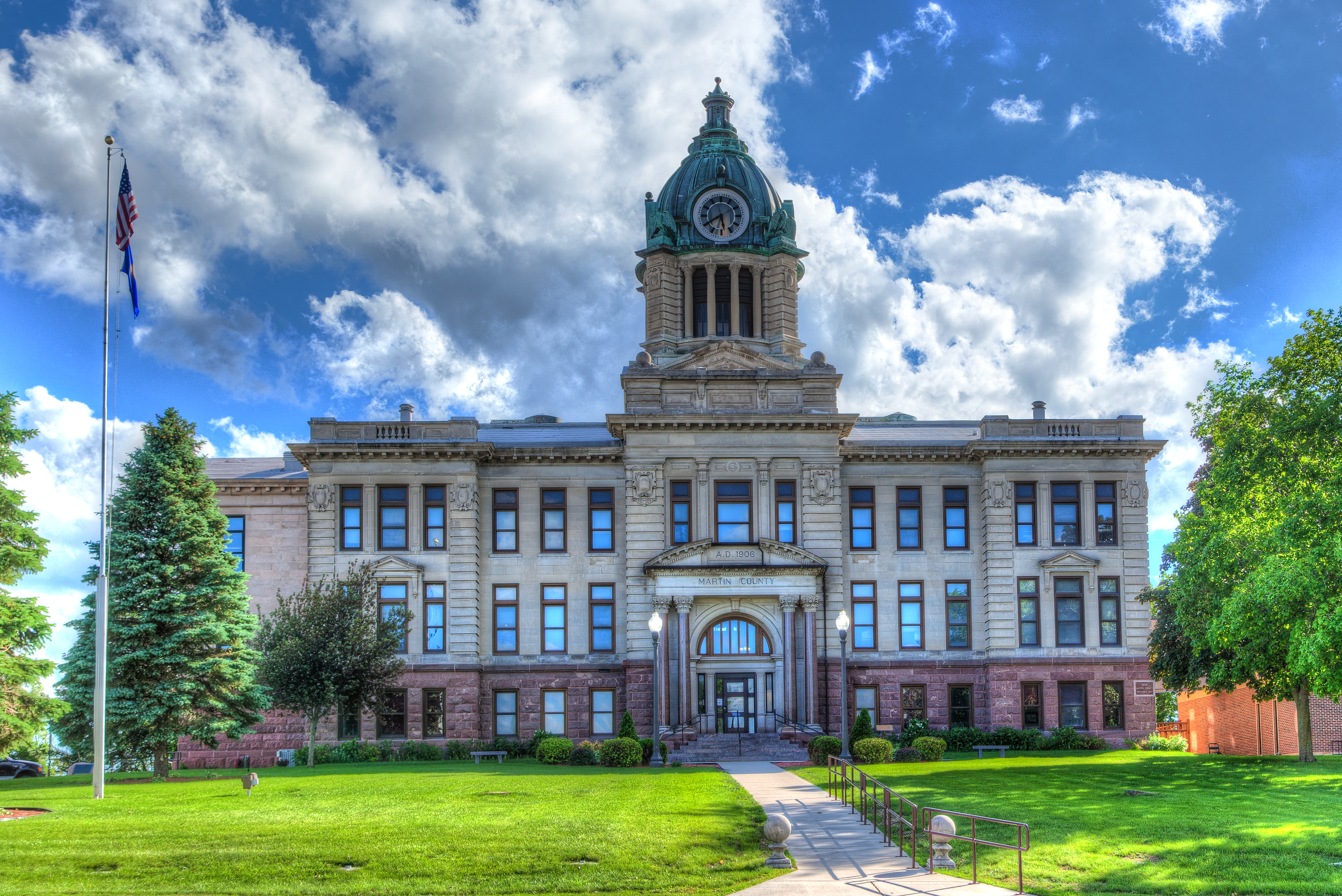
Martin County Courthouse

Charles Emlen Bell (1858–1932), often known as C.E. Bell, was an American architect of Council Bluffs, Iowa and Minneapolis, Minnesota. He worked alone and in partnership with John H. Kent and Menno S. Detweiler. He also worked as part of Bell, Tyrie and Chapman. A number of his works are listed on the U.S. National Register of Historic Places.

== Biography and career ==
Bell was born in McLean County, Illinois, on March 31, 1858, and was educated at West Town Boarding School, Philadelphia, Pennsylvania, U.S. In 1880, he married Helen Louise "Nellie" Wickham (1858–1913), and they moved to Council Bluffs, Iowa in 1884.

Bell began his career as a carpenter and worked on the construction of the post office in Council Bluffs. He and John Kent established a partnership, and won the competition to design the Montana State Capitol. They opened an office in Helena, Montana, for the project.

Bell moved to Minneapolis, Minnesota and set up a partnership with Menno Detweiler. From 1904 until Detweiler's death in 1907, Bell & Detweiler built courthouses throughout the midwest including Brown County Courthouse (Wisconsin), Delaware County Courthouse (Iowa), and Martin County Courthouse (Minnesota). In 1908, Bell joined architects George Augustus Chapman and William W. Tyrie in the firm Bell, Tyrie and Chapman, where he remained until 1913. Bell worked alone, with only brief partnerships, for the rest of his career and died on May 10, 1932, at Swedish Hospital in Minneapolis. He was buried in Lakewood Cemetery.

== Selected works ==
Bells works include (with attribution):

- Brown County Courthouse, Beaux Arts, built 1910 (Bell), 100 S. Jefferson Street, Green Bay, Wisconsin, NRHP-listed.
- Cass County Courthouse, Beaux Arts, built 1904-1906 (Bell), South Ninth Street between Second and Third Avenues, Fargo, North Dakota, NRHP-listed.
- Delaware County Courthouse, Romanesque Revival, built 1894 (Bell), Main Street, Manchester, Iowa, NRHP-listed.
- Deer Lodge County Courthouse, built 1898 (Bell & Kent), Anaconda, Montana, NRHP-listed
- Gov. S. H. Elrod House, Colonial Revival, built 1908 (Bell), 301 North Commercial Street, Clark, South Dakota, NRHP-listed.
- Grant County Courthouse, Classical Revival, built in 1915 (Bell; Bell & Detweiler), junction of Park Avenue and Main Street Milbank, South Dakota, NRHP-listed.
- One or more works in Harlan Courthouse Square Commercial District (Bell), Market, 6th, 7th, and Court Streets, around Courthouse Square Harlan, Iowa, NRHP-listed.
- Koochiching County Courthouse, Classical Revival, completed in 1909 (Bell), 4th Street and 7th Avenue, International Falls, Minnesota, NRHP-listed.
- Marshall County Courthouse, Renaissance, built in 1908 (Bell and Detweiler), 911 Vander Horck Avenue, Britton, South Dakota, NRHP-listed.
- Martin County Courthouse, Beaux Arts, built 1906-1907 (Bell), 201 Lake Avenue, Fairmont, Minnesota.
- Shelby County Courthouse, Romanesque, built 1893 (Bell), 7th and Court Streets, Harlan, Iowa, NRHP-listed.
- South Dakota State Capitol, built 1905–1910 (Bell), bounded by Broadway, Washington, and Capitol Avenues, Pierre, South Dakota, NRHP-listed.
- Woodford County Courthouse (Illinois), built 1897 (Bell), 115 North Main Street, Eureka, Illinois
