= J.J. Hoag House =

Historic house in Iowa, United States

- U.S. National Register of Historic Places
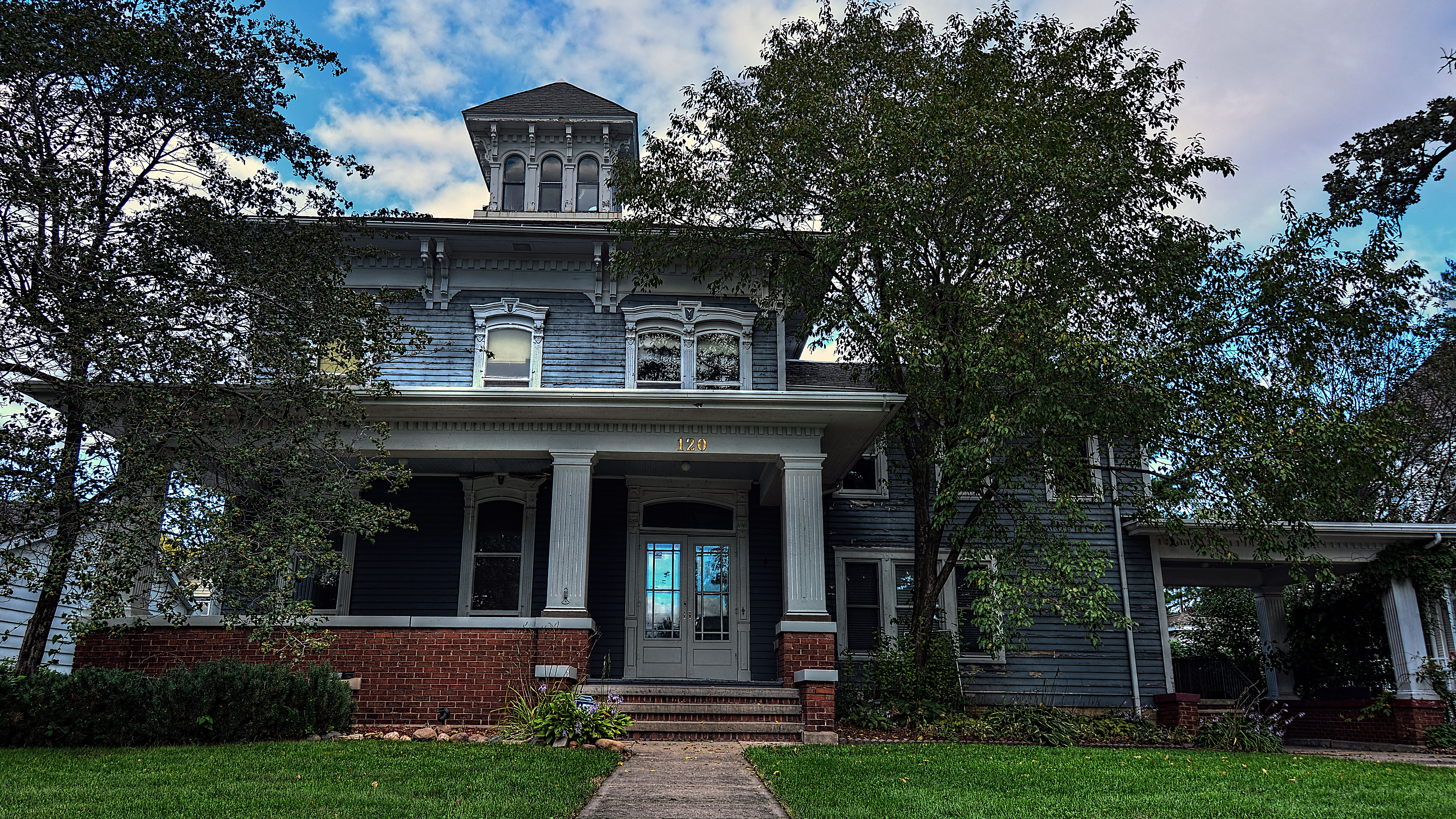

- Location within Iowa Location within the United States
- Location: 120 E. Union St. Manchester, Iowa
- Coordinates: 42°29′16″N 91°27′24″W
- Area: less than one acre
- Built: 1864
- Architectural style: Italianate
- NRHP reference No.: 76000760
- Added to NRHP: August 13, 1976

The J.J. Hoag House, also known as The Wheat House, is a historic residence located in Manchester, Iowa, United States. It received its nickname from its association to Hoag who was a grain dealer. The house is a well-preserved example of the mid-19th century Italianate style. The two-story frame structure features a hipped roof capped with a belvedere, bracketed eaves, and ornate window hoods. The front porch and the porte-cochere were added around the turn of the 20th century. The house was listed on the National Register of Historic Places in 1976.
