= Coffin's Grove Stagecoach House =

Historic house in Iowa, United States

- Formerly listed on the U.S. National Register of Historic Places
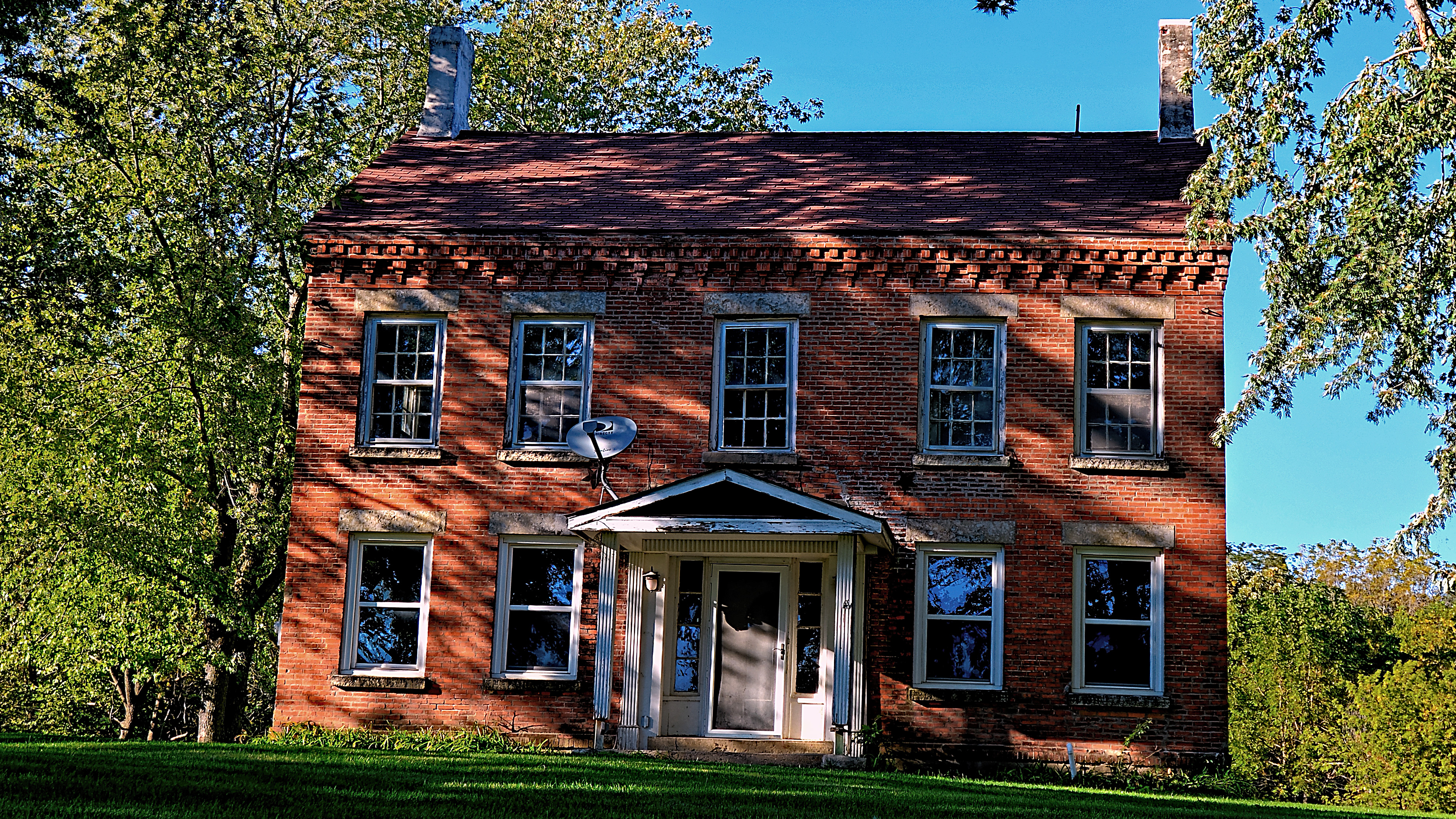

- Location within Iowa Location within the United States
- Location: 3 miles west of Manchester, Iowa
- Coordinates: 42°30′01″N 91°32′31″W
- Area: 5 acres (2.0 ha)
- Built: 1855
- Architectural style: Colonial
- NRHP reference No.: 75000681

Significant dates
- Added to NRHP: February 20, 1975
- Removed from NRHP: August 15, 2018

Coffin's Grove Stagecoach House, also known as the Henry Baker House, was a historic building located west of Manchester, Iowa, United States. Coffin's Grove was named for Clement Coffin who settled in the area in 1840. His son-in-law Henry Baker joined him the following year. The house was built in 1855 to accommodate the increase in travelers passing through the area. It served as a hotel, post office and the second floor was used for community functions like dances. The two-story Colonial style was unusual for a structure this far west. It is typically found in Ohio. The house featured a foundation of limestone quarried on the property and brick that was kilned here. Across the road from where the house was located are the remnants of barns built in 1849. They were the first frame barns in the Delaware County. The house was listed on the National Register of Historic Places in 1975.

In 2017, the Stagecoach House was in the process of being dismantled. Lacking financial support from the local community, neither the Delaware County Historical Society nor the Iowa Historical Society were able to take on the expenses related to the upkeep of the landmark property, and no other individual benefactors stepped up to do so. On August 15, 2018, it was delisted from the National Register of Historic Places.
