= Lincoln Elementary School (Manchester, Iowa) =

- U.S. National Register of Historic Places
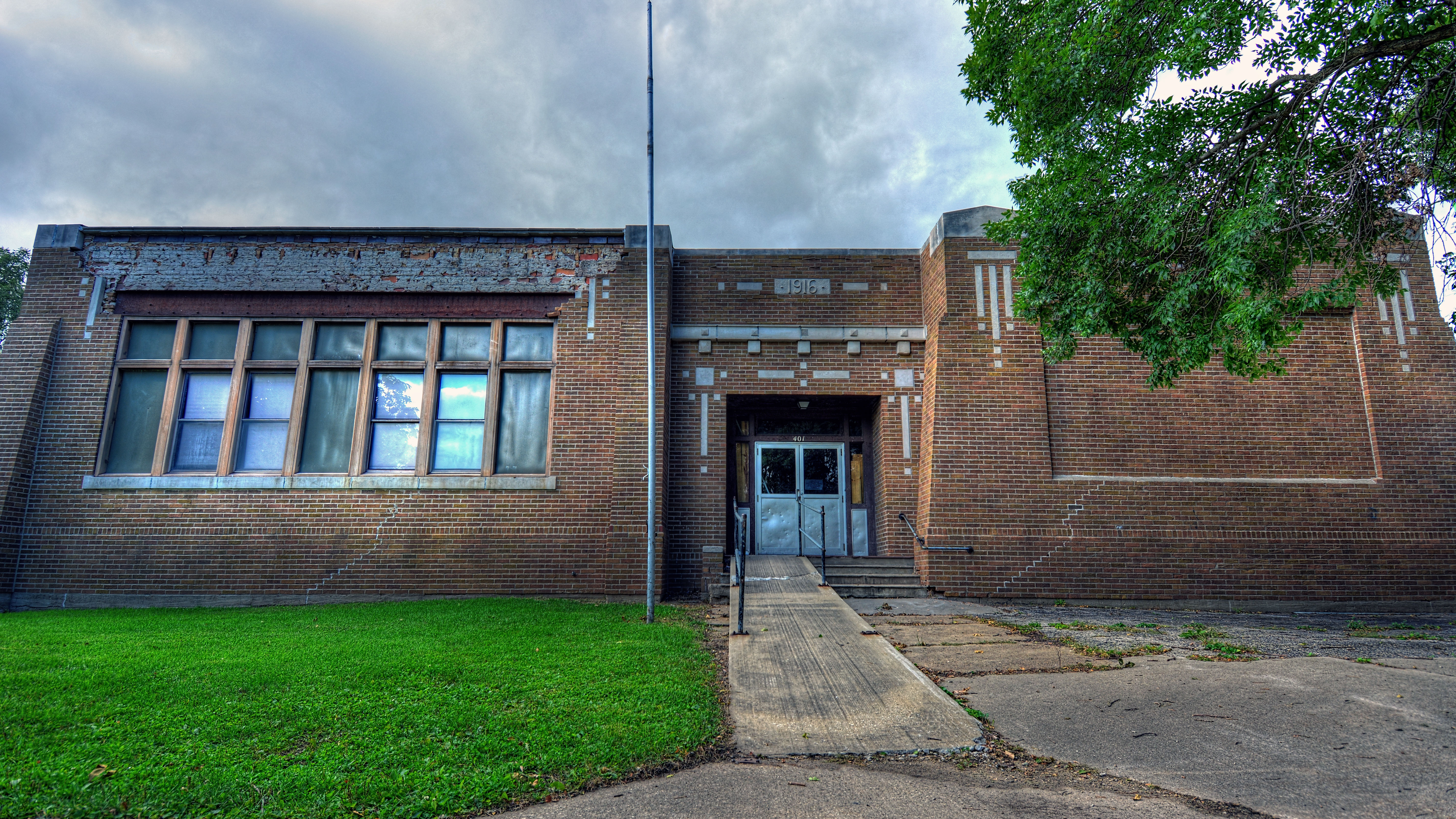

- Location within Iowa Location within the United States
- Location: 401 Lincoln St. Manchester, Iowa
- Coordinates: 42°28′40″N 91°27′45″W
- Area: Less than one acre
- Built: 1916
- Architect: R.R. Mayberry
- Architectural style: Prairie School
- MPS: Public Schools for Iowa: Growth and Change MPS
- NRHP reference No.: 02001243
- Added to NRHP: October 24, 2002

Lincoln Elementary School is located in Manchester, Iowa, United States. Its historical significance is derived from its Prairie School style. Cedar Rapids architect Robert R. Mayberry designed the building, which was completed in 1916. The single story structure is composed of brick and clay tile, built on a concrete basement. The school was closed in 1965, but reopened two years later as a first grade school. It was used for special education classes in the 1970s, and became an elementary school again in the 1990s. The school building was listed on the National Register of Historic Places in 2002.
