= Brown County Courthouse (Wisconsin) =

- U.S. National Register of Historic Places
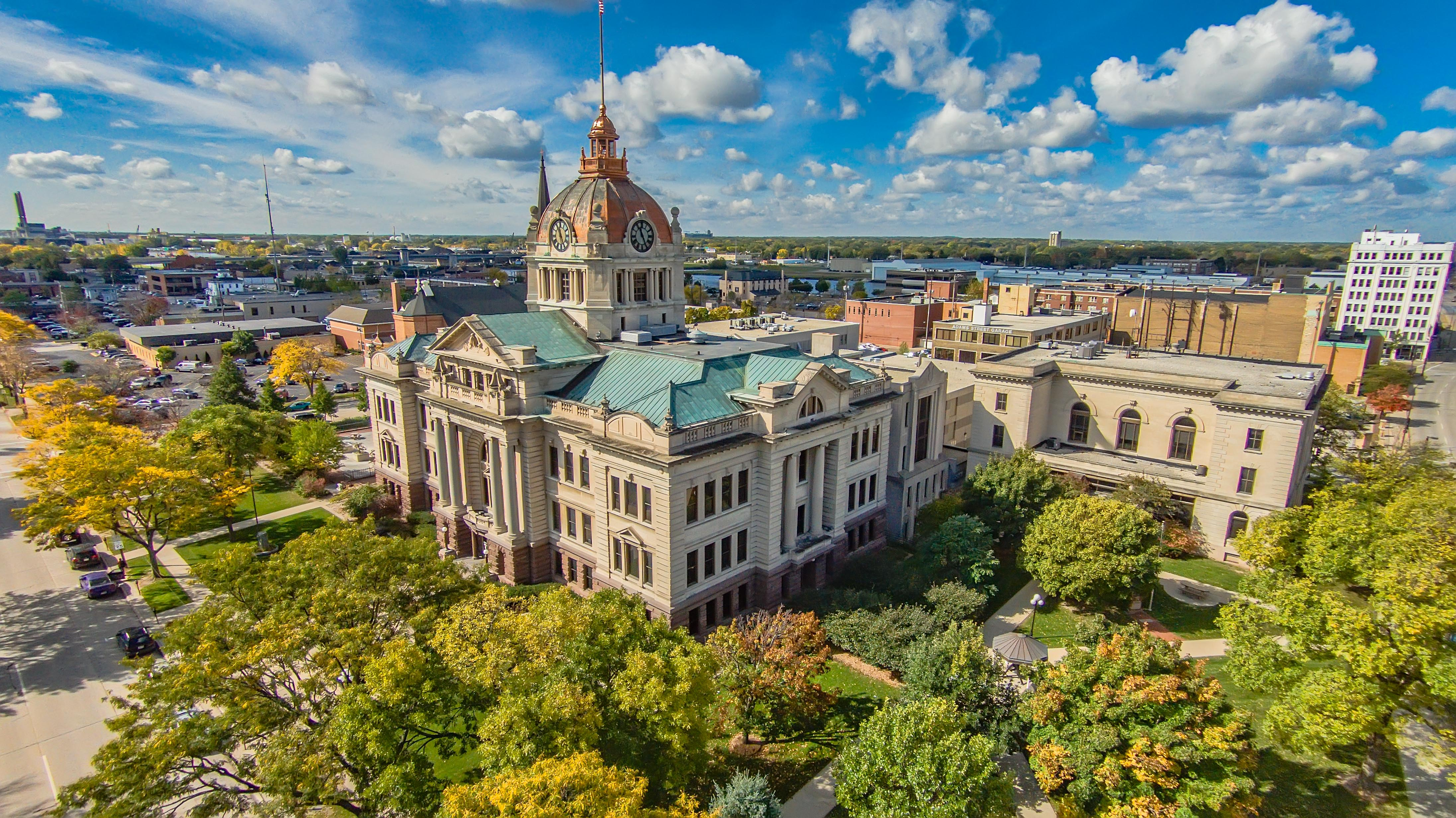
- Brown County Courthouse

- Location within Wisconsin Location within the United States
- Interactive map showing the location for Brown County Courthouse
- Location: 100 S. Jefferson St. Green Bay, Wisconsin
- Coordinates: 44.51286°N 88.0142°W
- Built: 1908
- Architect: Charles E. Bell
- Architectural style: Beaux-Arts
- NRHP reference No.: 76000053
- Added to NRHP: January 1, 1976

The Brown County Courthouse located in Green Bay, Wisconsin. It was added to the National Register of Historic Places for its artistic and architectural significance in 1976. The courthouse is a waypoint on the Packers Heritage Trail.

== History ==
The courthouse was designed by Charles E. Bell and completed in 1908. The original cost was $318,797.67. In 1992, it underwent renovations costing $10 million.
