= Rachel Aukes =

American novelist

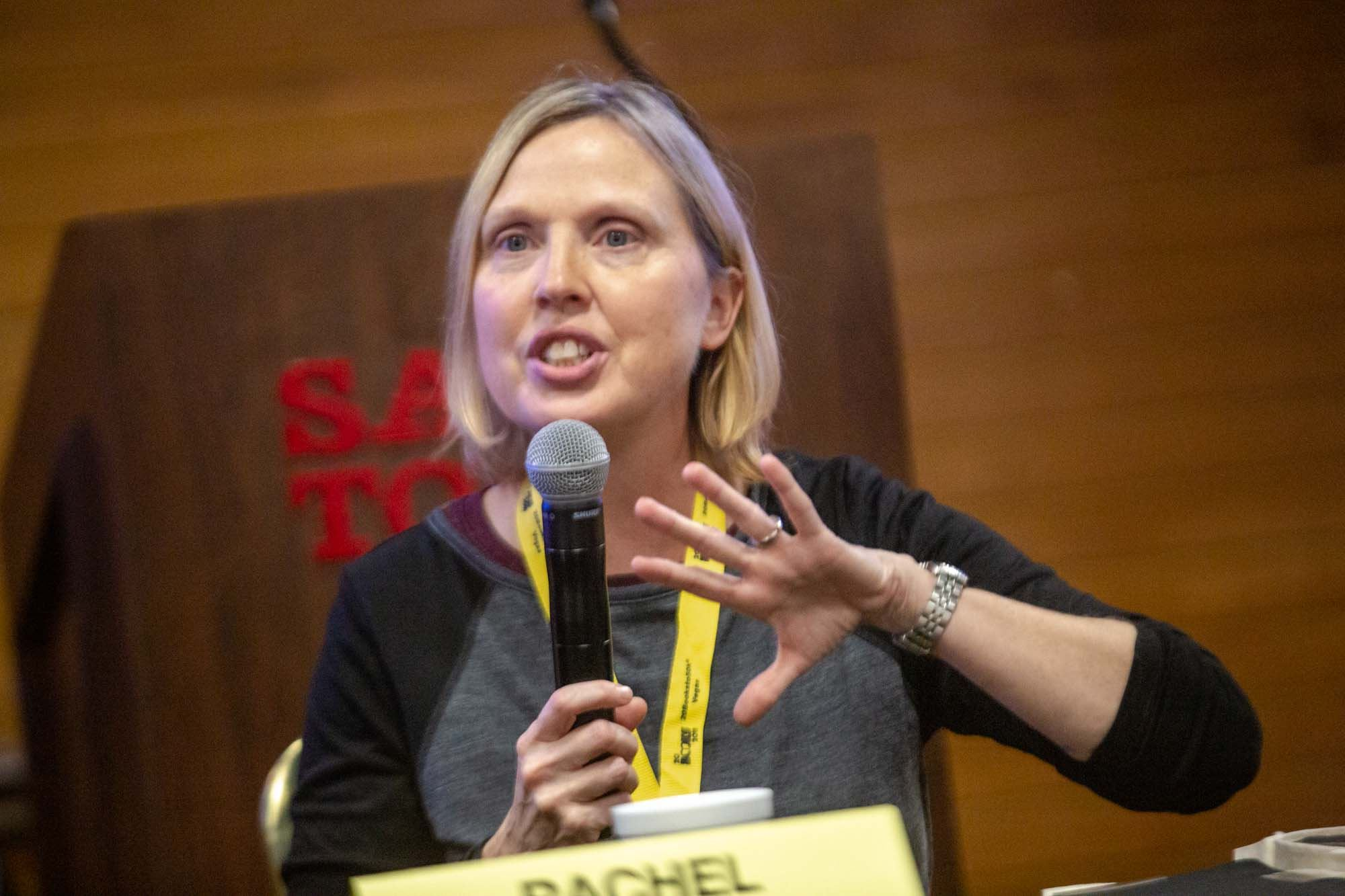
- Rachel Aukes at the 20Books conference in Las Vegas in 2019.
- Born: Rachel Recker; Manchester, Iowa, U.S.
- Education: Drake University (MPA); University of Northern Iowa (BA)
- Occupation: Novelist
- Writing career
- Period: 2011–present
- Genres: Horror, science fiction, genre fiction, dark fantasy, post-apocalyptic fiction
- Website: www.rachelaukes.com

Rachel Rae Recker (born October 3, 1972), professionally known as Rachel Aukes, is an American horror / science fiction / fantasy novelist best known for the Deadland Saga. She is a Wattpad Star, her stories having over eight million reads. Her earliest five books and two short stories were released under the pen name Berinn Rae. Several of her books are self-published under Surprisingly Adequate Publishing, her publishing company. She was born in Manchester, Iowa, U.S.A. in 1972 and attended West Delaware high school. She received her undergraduate degree in Management Information Systems and Communications from University of Northern Iowa and a masters of public administration at Drake University. She is a member of the Horror Writers Association, the Science Fiction and Fantasy Writers of America, the International Thriller Writers and Sisters in Crime. She lives in the Midwest.

== Selected works ==
=== Guardians of the Seven Seals series ===
Paranormal Romance, written as Berinn Rae

- Knightfall (Crescent Moon Press, 2011, ISBN 978-0-9828200-1-8)
- Hellbound (Crescent Moon Press, 2012, ISBN 978-1-937254-43-8)

=== Colliding Worlds Trilogy ===
Science Fiction Romance, written as Berinn Rae

- Collision (Simon & Schuster, 2012, ISBN 978-1-4405-5239-7), (Surprisingly Adequate Publishing, 2018)
- Implosion (Simon & Schuster, 2013, ISBN 978-1-4405-6115-3), (Surprisingly Adequate Publishing, 2018)
- Explosion (Simon & Schuster, 2013, ISBN 978-1-4405-6113-9), (Surprisingly Adequate Publishing, 2018)

=== Deadland Saga ===
Horror/Apocalyptic Science Fiction This three-book series is a modern remake of Dante Alighieri's Divine Comedy with a zombie apocalypse twist.

- 100 Days in Deadland (Surprisingly Adequate Publishing, 2013, ISBN 978-0989901802)
- Deadland's Harvest (Surprisingly Adequate Publishing, 2014, ISBN 978-0989901819)
- Deadland Rising (Surprisingly Adequate Publishing, 2014, ISBN 978-0989901826)

=== Fringe Series ===
Science Fiction

- Fringe Runner (Surprisingly Adequate Publishing, 2016, ISBN 978-0989901864)
- Fringe Station (Surprisingly Adequate Publishing, 2016, ISBN 978-0989901871)
- Fringe Campaign (Surprisingly Adequate Publishing, 2017, ISBN 978-0989901888)
- Fringe War (Surprisingly Adequate Publishing, 2018, ISBN 978-0989901895)
- Fringe Legacy (Surprisingly Adequate Publishing, 2019, ISBN 978-1732844902)

=== Tidy Guides ===
Non-Fiction

- The Tidy Guide to Writing A Novel (Surprisingly Adequate Publishing, 2018, ISBN 978-1-7328449-1-9)
- The Tidy Guide to Self-Editing Your Novel (Surprisingly Adequate Publishing, 2019, ISBN 978-1-7328449-2-6)
- The Tidy Guide to Publishing Your Novel (Surprisingly Adequate Publishing, 2019, ISBN 978-1-7328449-5-7)

=== Bounty Hunter Series ===
Post-Apocalyptic Science Fiction

- Bounty Hunter (Surprisingly Adequate Publishing, 2020, ISBN 978-1732844964)
- Bounty Hunter: Dig Two Graves (Surprisingly Adequate Publishing, 2020, ISBN 978-1732844971)
- Bounty Hunter: Nothing to Nobody (Surprisingly Adequate Publishing, 2020, ISBN 978-1732844988)
- Bounty Hunter: Rake and Scrape (Surprisingly Adequate Publishing, 2020, ISBN 978-1732844995)

=== Flight of the Javelin Series ===
Science Fiction

- Black Sheep (Aethon Books, 2020, ISBN 979-8645362140)
- Free Station (Aethon Books, 2020, ISBN 979-8654918123)
- Rogue Planet (Aethon Books, 2020, ISBN 979-8670040877)

=== Space Troopers Series (co-written with Jamie McFarlane) ===
Science Fiction

- Rebel's Call (Aethon Books, 2021, ISBN 979-8509460630)
- Rebel's Run (Aethon Books, 2021, ISBN 979-8472697088)
- Rebel's Strike (Aethon Books, 2022, ISBN 979-8797093503)

=== Waymaker Wars Series ===
Science Fiction

- Space Junk (Aethon Books, 2022, ISBN 979-8441749350)
- Freezer Burn (Aethon Books, 2022, ISBN 979-8832946030)
- Malfunction Junction (Aethon Books, 2022, ISBN 979-8839176317)

=== Secondhand Spaceman Series ===
Science Fiction

- Secondhand Spaceman (Surprisingly Adequate Publishing, 2024, ISBN 978-1956120059)
- Secondhand Starship (Surprisingly Adequate Publishing, 2024, ISBN 978-1956120073)
- Secondhand Singularity (Surprisingly Adequate Publishing, 2024, ISBN 978-1956120080)

=== Sam Brodie Series ===
Science Fiction Thriller

- The Lazarus Key (Surprisingly Adequate Publishing, 2024, ISBN 978-1956120042)

=== Redline Corps Series ===
Science Fiction

- Expendable (Aethon Books, 2024, ISBN 979-8340920140)
- Besieged (Aethon Books, 2024, ISBN 979-8345625767)
- Vanguard (Aethon Books, 2024, ISBN 979-8302535016)

=== Infinity Upgrade Series (co-written with JN Chaney) ===
Science Fiction

- Infinity Upgrade (Variant Publications, 2026)
- All Systems Go (Variant Publications, 2026)
- Expansion Pack (Variant Publications, 2026)

=== Short fiction ===
- Black Box (Variant Publications, 2026)
- Stealing Fate (Surprisingly Adequate Publishing, 2012, ISBN 978-1-4762368-0-3)
- Envy's Revenge, Tales from the SFR Brigade, Vol.1 anthology (2013, ISBN 978-1-3012091-9-4)
- Beer, Bugs, and the End of the World, Stories On The Go (Indanth, 2014, ASIN B00R1GECO6)
- Cracked, At Hells Gates, Vol. 1 anthology (2015, ISBN 978-1502545398)
- Perfect, Fat Zombie anthology (Permuted Press, 2015, ISBN 978-1618684387)
- Control+Alt+Delete, Never Fear anthology (13Thirty Books, 2015, ISBN 978-0692408469)
- A Tale of Three Deaths, Out of Tune, Volume 2 anthology (Journalstone, 2016, ISBN 978-1942712732)
- Sweeton's Shangri-La, Run anthology (Seaside Publications, 2016, ISBN 978-1539653936)
- The Seeker, Imagines anthology (Gallery Books, 2016, ISBN 978-1501130809)
- Bat Johnson, the Mad Mortician of Mars, Pew! Pew! anthology (Wooden Pen Press, 2017, ISBN 978-1546902126)
- The Teardrop that became a Torrent, Galactic Frontiers anthology (Shatterhouse Press, 2017, ISBN 978-1618684387)
- The Fall of Fort Bragg, Missions from the Extinction Cycle Volume 1 anthology (Great Wave Publishing, 2019, ISBN 978-1724159786)
- Outpost 46: Deadwood, Missions from the Extinction Cycle Volume 2 anthology (Great Wave Publishing, 2019, ISBN 978-1092191715)
- Golems of War, The Expanding Universe Volume 5 anthology (LMBPN Publishing, 2019, ISBN 978-1691851812)
- Ragged Old Golem, We Dare: No Man's Land anthology (Theogony Books, 2021, ISBN 978-1648551727)
- The Bounty Hunter's Creed, We Dare: Wanted, Dead or Alive anthology (Theogony Books, 2022, ISBN 978-1648553813)
- Heavy Metal Night at the Met, Mega Metal Attack audio anthology (Soundbooth Audio, 2023)
- Brown 26, Learning to be Human Short Stories (Flame Tree Press, 2024, ISBN 978-1804177792)
- Three-Headed Problem, Weird Tales Magazine No. 368 (Weird Tales Magazine, 2024)

== Awards and honors ==
- Named "Best of 2013" by Suspense Magazine (100 Days in Deadland)
- Named "Best Zombie Books" by Huffington Post (100 Days in Deadland)
- 2013 RWA Silken Sands Star Award for Best Short Story (Stealing Fate)
- 2012 Stealing Fate listed as a Recommended Read by USA Today
- 2012 EPIC Award finalist for Best Fantasy Romance (Knightfall)
- 2012 Bookie Award nominee for Best Fantasy Romance (Knightfall)
