= McGee School =

- U.S. National Register of Historic Places
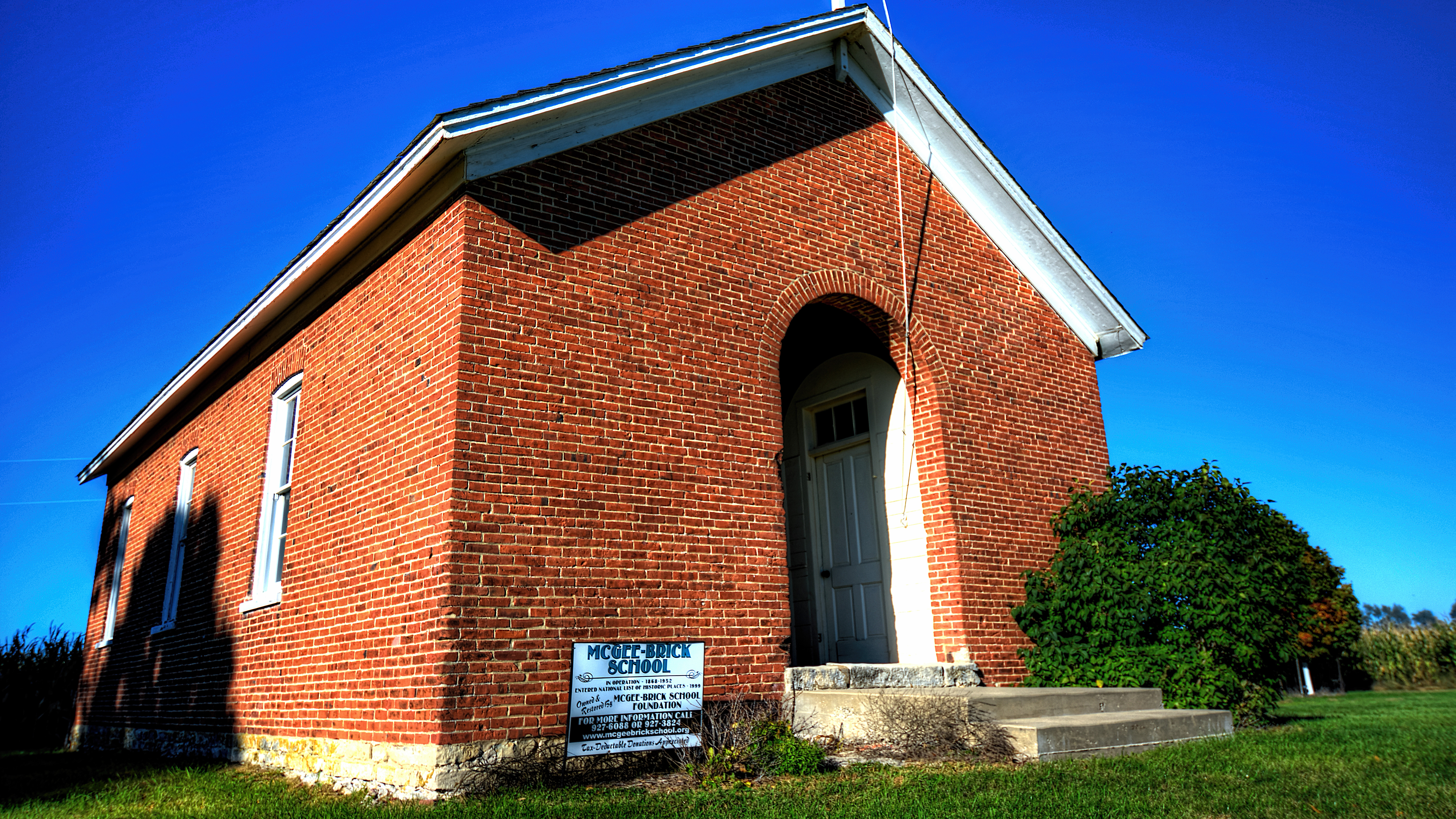

- Location within Iowa Location within the United States
- Location: Junction of 197th and 145th Aves.
- Nearest city: Manchester, Iowa
- Coordinates: 42°30′08″N 91°31′07″W
- Area: Less than one acre
- Built: 1868
- NRHP reference No.: 99001251
- Added to NRHP: October 14, 1999

McGee School, also known as Coffin's Grove Township, District #1, is a one-room schoolhouse located west of Manchester, Iowa, United States. Built in 1868 in a folk-vernacular style, it is a rare example of a brick one-room schoolhouse in Iowa, and the only on left in Delaware County. Also rare is the tall Romanesque arched entryway, which led to a cloakroom on either side. The building is also significant as the only known school associated with Sarah Gillespie Huftalen, a rural school advocate and educator, who taught here from 1883 to 1884. It was listed on the National Register of Historic Places in 1999.
