= Spring Branch Butter Factory Site =

- U.S. National Register of Historic Places
- Location: Address restricted
- Nearest city: Manchester, Iowa
- Built: 1872
- NRHP reference No.: 74000782
- Added to NRHP: June 28, 1974

The Spring Branch Butter Factory Site is an archaeological site located in the vicinity of Manchester, Iowa, United States. John Stewart built the first commercial creamery in the state of Iowa at this location in 1872. He won the gold medal for the best butter at the Centennial Exposition in Philadelphia in 1876. Because of this, he made technological and managerial changes to his operation that transformed commercial butter making in the state. Stewart became the founding president of the Northern Iowa Butter and Cheese Association, which was headquartered in Manchester. As markets on the East Coast expanded "creamery grade" butter was shipped regularly between northeast Iowa and New York City. By 1889, commercial creameries had taken the place of the farm-based dairy in Iowa. The site was listed on the National Register of Historic Places in 1974.
