= Delaware County Courthouse (Iowa) =

- U.S. National Register of Historic Places
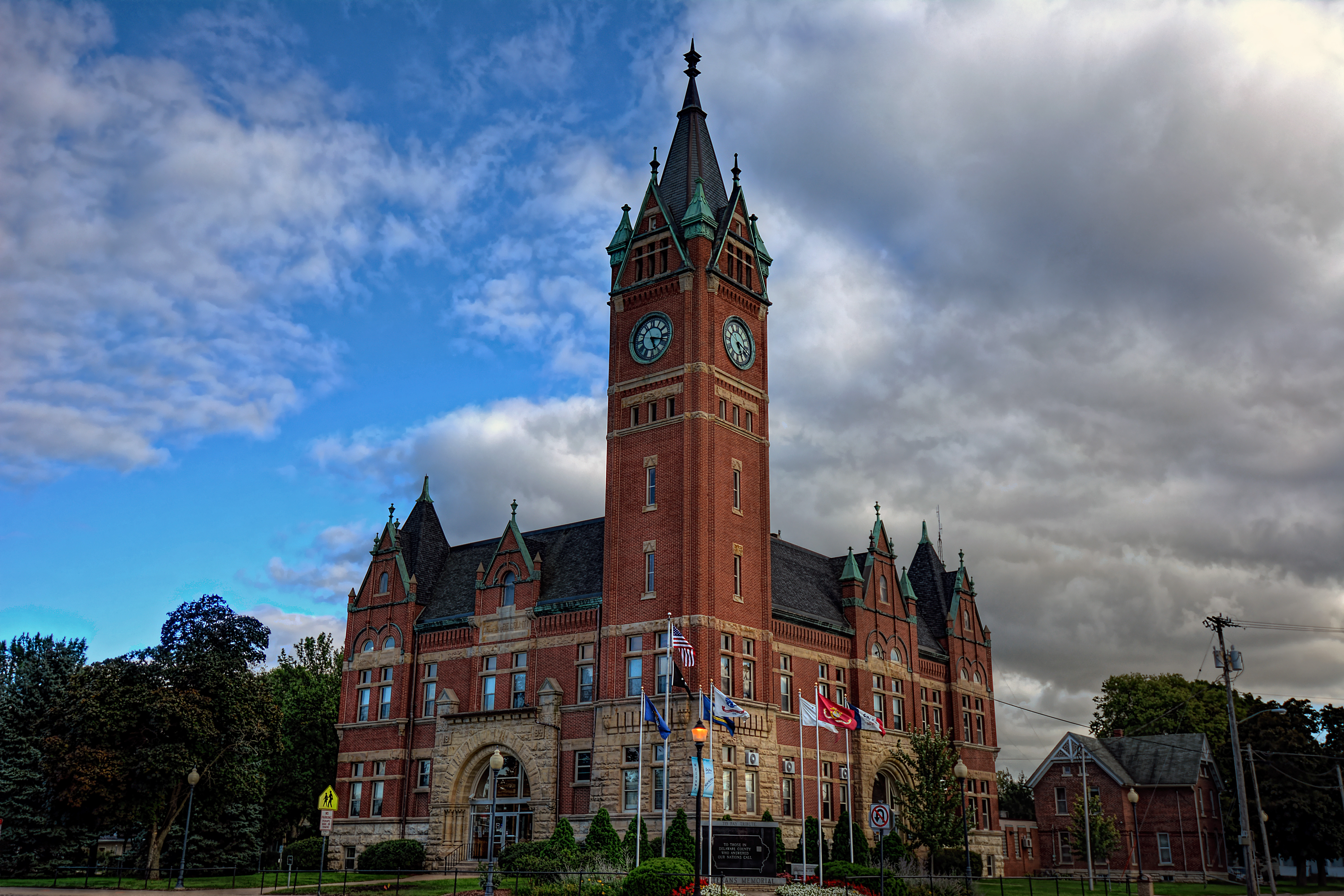
- The Delaware County courthouse in Manchester

- Location within Iowa Location within the United States
- Interactive map showing the location for Delaware County Courthouse
- Location: Main St. Manchester, Iowa
- Coordinates: 42°29′01.1″N 91°27′18.1″W
- Area: less than one acre
- Built: 1894
- Architect: Bell & Kent
- Architectural style: Romanesque
- MPS: County Courthouses in Iowa TR
- NRHP reference No.: 81000234
- Added to NRHP: July 2, 1981

The Delaware County Courthouse, located in Manchester, Iowa, United States, was built in 1894. It was listed on the National Register of Historic Places in 1981 as a part of the County Courthouses in Iowa Thematic Resource. The current structure is the fourth building to house court functions and county administration.

== History ==
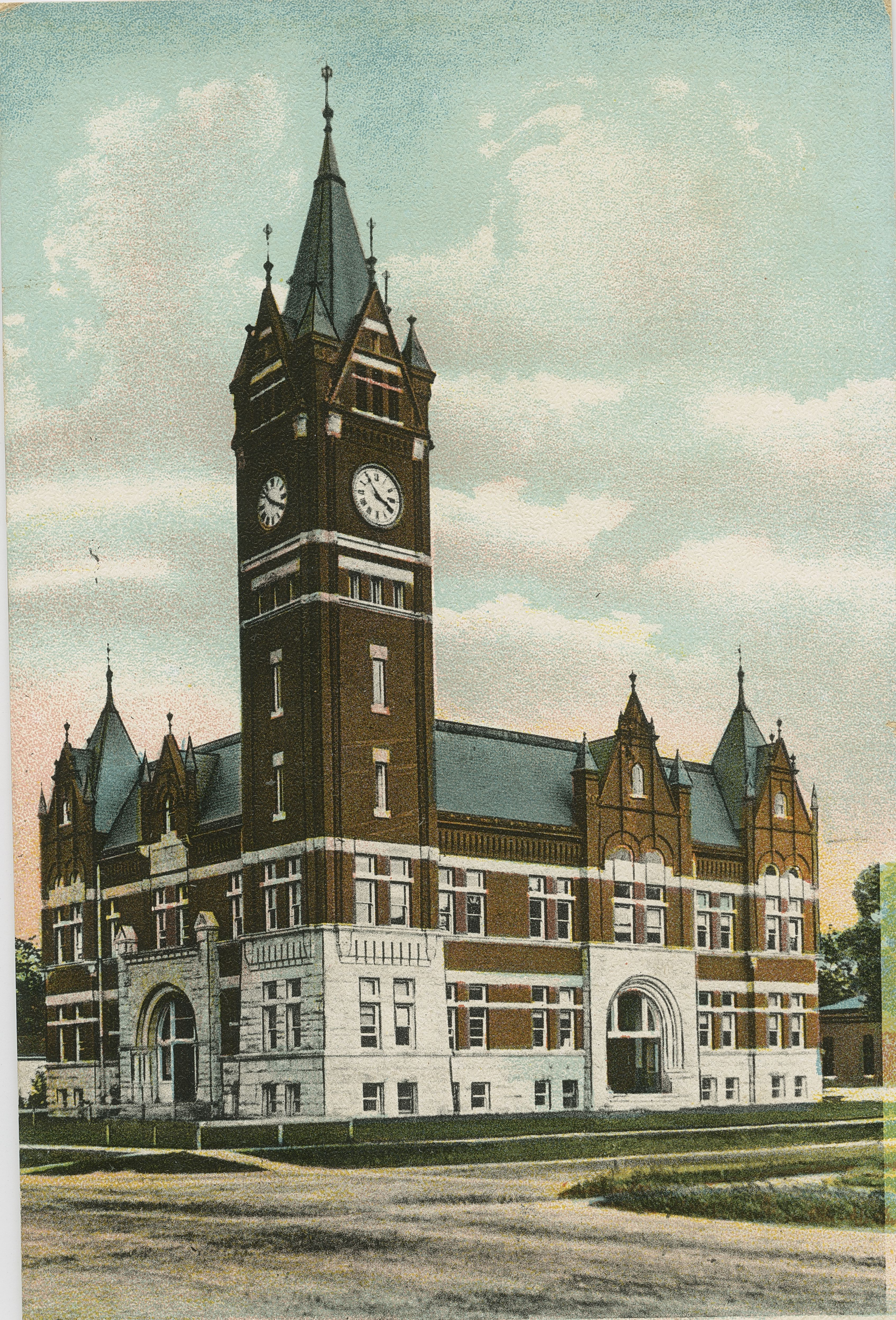
Delaware County Courthouse, 1908

When Delaware County was formed from Dubuque County in 1837 the first place chosen for a county seat was in the small community of Ead's Grove in the northeast part of the county. County citizens thought that a place near the center of the county was preferable, and a site near Silver Lake that eventually became Delhi was chosen. It took four years before the site was purchased for the county seat, and then only after two citizens offered to loan the county the $200. The first courthouse was a two-story log structure that was built in the winter of 1843-1844 by county citizens, and it was the first building constructed in Delhi. It measured 18 by 24 feet (5.5 m × 7.3 m), but it had no roof, windows, or doors. Jurors were required to climb a ladder to the jury room on the second floor. It took two years for the county commissioners to raise $65 to complete the building. A second courthouse was built beginning in 1850 and because no contractors applied to build the facility, citizens performed the work using their own tools. They were paid in town lots in Delhi that were valued at $5. The combination courthouse and jail was completed in 1853.

Delhi and Manchester soon began to battle over who would be the county seat. Manchester lost several referendums that were held to determine the issue until November 2, 1880, when they finally won. The county seat moved to Manchester and a two-story frame structure was built as a temporary courthouse. The current courthouse was completed in 1894 for $38,000. The county used a bridge fund, dog tax, and the sale of swampland to finance its construction. It was designed by the Council Bluffs architectural firm of Bell & Kent. Donations from 700 county citizens funded the clock in the tower. The building was dedicated on January 7, 1895. Its significance is derived from its association with county government, and the political power and prestige of Manchester as the county seat.

== Architecture ==
The courthouse is a 2½-story structure built on a raised basement. Constructed of red pressed brick, the building is a combination of the Romanesque Revival and the Chateauesque styles. The Romanesque is found in the entrance portals with their rusticated stone and round arches, the heavy rock-faced stone beltcourses, and the round-arched windows on the second floor. The Chateauesque is found in the steeply pitched roofs and the steeply pitched gables with finials on the various towers. The main body of the building measures 76 by 100 feet (23 m × 30 m). The clock tower and spire are 135 feet (41 m) high, and the walls of the building are 18 inches (46 cm) thick. The decorative metal ceilings on the first floor and the elaborate woodwork are original to the building.
