= Ruth Suckow House =

Historic house in Iowa, United States

- U.S. National Register of Historic Places
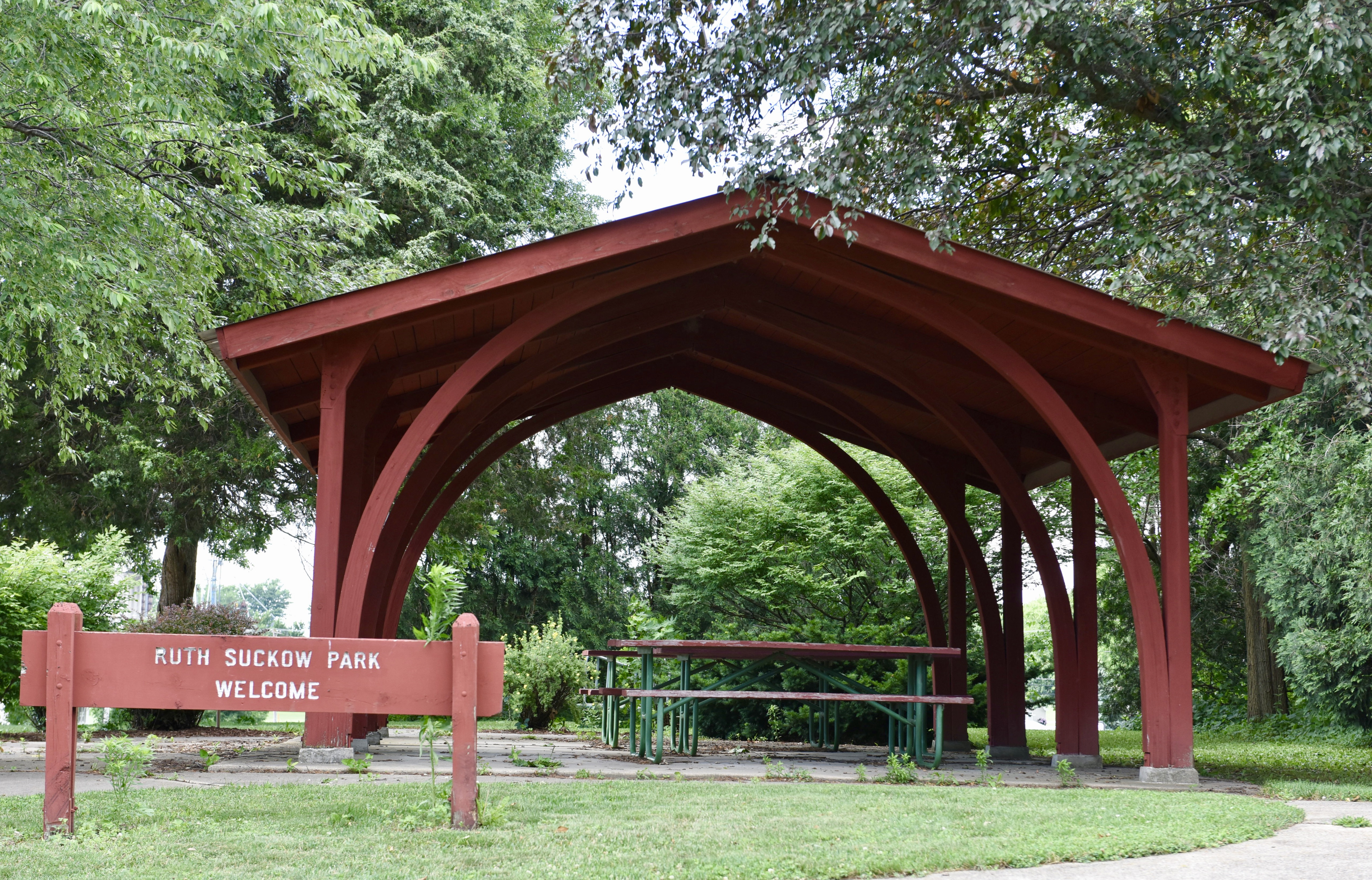
- The house was located where the Ruth Suckow Park is now located.

- Location within Iowa Location within the United States
- Location: S. Radcliffe and 5th St. Earlville, Iowa
- Coordinates: 42°28′42″N 91°16′01″W
- Area: less than one acre
- Built: 1873
- NRHP reference No.: 77000507
- Added to NRHP: December 23, 1977

The Ruth Suckow House was a historic residence located in Earlville, Iowa, United States. It is associated with Iowa-born author Ruth Suckow who lived here in the summers of 1925 and 1926. While in residence she wrote her second novel, The Odyssey of a Nice Girl (1925), and several short stories. The single-story, frame, cottage was built sometime in the early 20th-century. It was listed on the National Register of Historic Places in 1977.
