= Bay Settlement Church and Monument =

- U.S. National Register of Historic Places
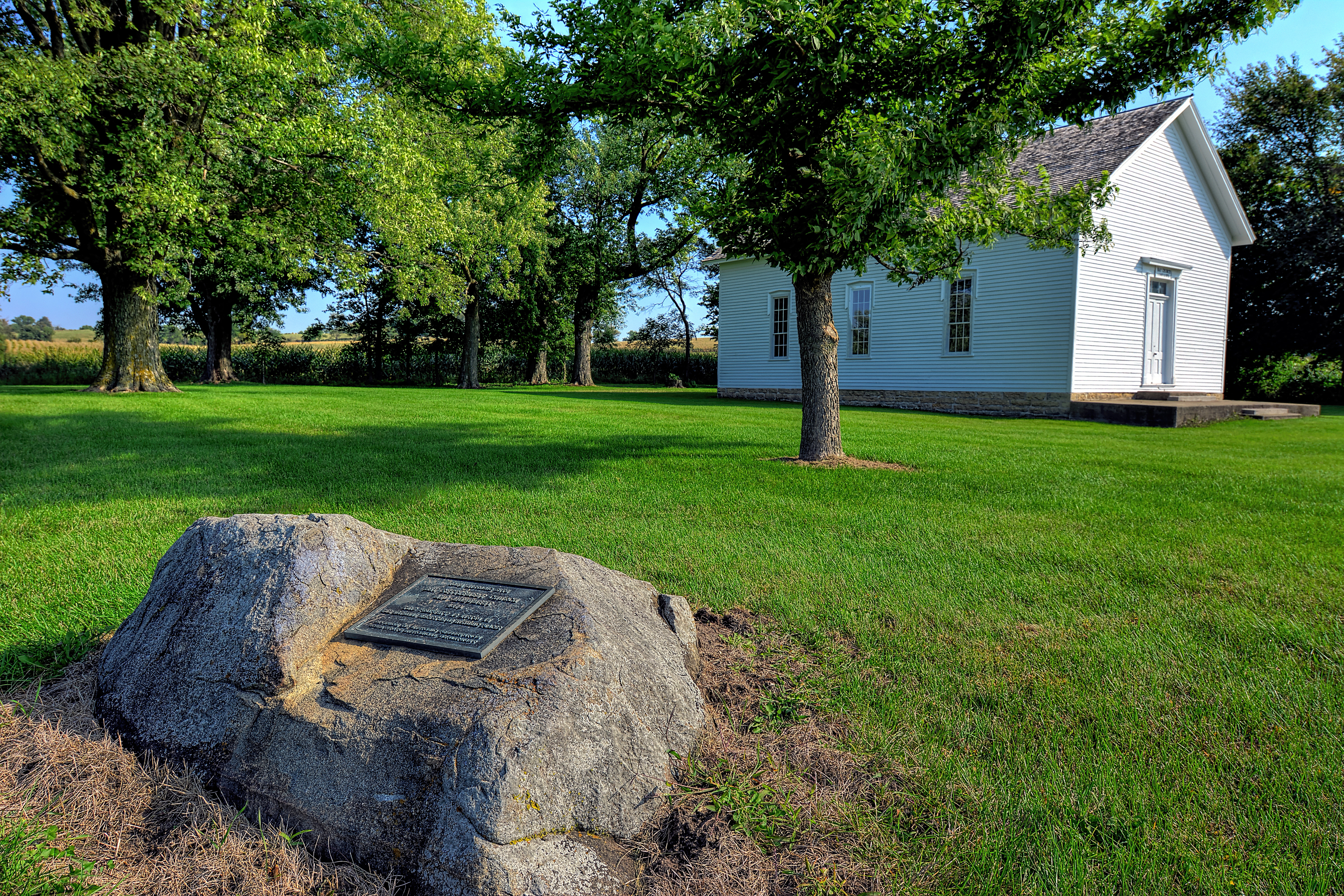

- Location within Iowa Location within the United States
- Nearest city: Delhi, Iowa
- Coordinates: 42°23′32″N 91°22′37″W
- Area: 4 acres (1.6 ha)
- Built: 1873
- NRHP reference No.: 77000506
- Added to NRHP: September 13, 1977

Bay Settlement Church and Monument is a historic church building and structure located in rural Delaware County, Iowa, southwest of Delhi. Organized in 1846 as the Upper Bay Church, it was the first Free Baptist Church congregation in Iowa. They built a log structure for their church the same year, and it served the congregation until this frame, front gable structure was completed in 1873. A monument to honor their 14 Civil War dead was erected in the cemetery in 1865. Its dedication in August that year is believed to be the first Memorial Day service in Iowa. Services were held on May 30 in succeeding years. The church and monument were listed on the National Register of Historic Places in 1977.
