= South Dakota State Capitol =

State capitol building of the U.S. state of South Dakota

Coordinates: 44.367167°N 100.346353°W

- U.S. National Register of Historic Places
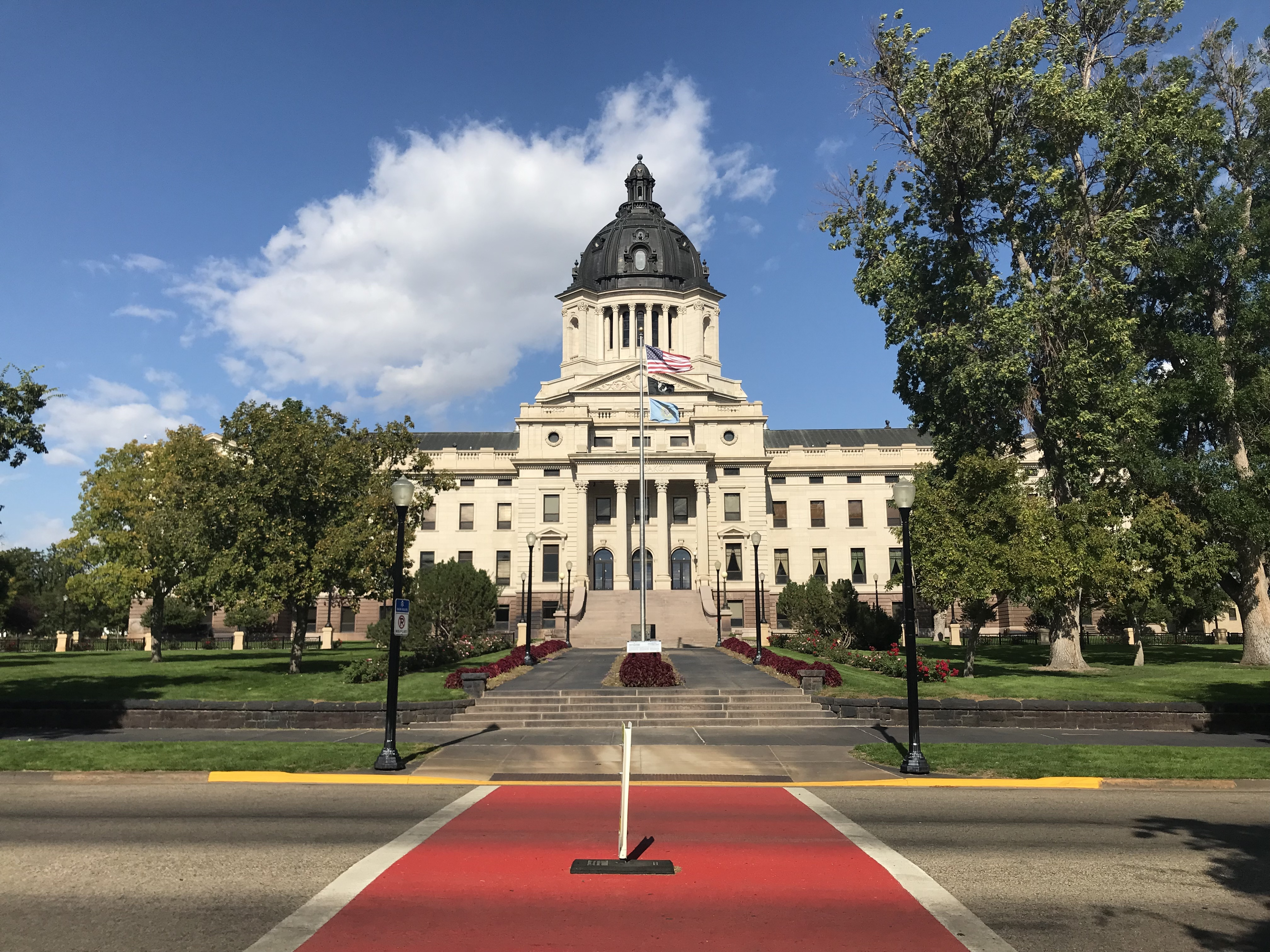
- South Dakota State Capitol

- Location within South Dakota Location within the United States
- Interactive map showing the location for South Dakota State Capitol
- Location: Bounded by Broadway, Washington, and Capitol Aves., Pierre, South Dakota
- Area: 20 acres (8.1 ha)
- Built: 1910; 116 years ago
- Built by: O. H. Olson
- Architect: Bell & Detweiler; Perkins & McWayne
- Architectural style: Renaissance Revival
- NRHP reference No.: 76001737
- Added to NRHP: September 1, 1976

The South Dakota State Capitol is the state capitol building of the U.S. state of South Dakota. Housing the South Dakota State Legislature, it is located in the state capital of Pierre at 500 East Capitol Avenue. The building houses the offices of most state officials, including the Governor of South Dakota.

== Construction ==
The building was constructed between 1905 and 1910. The designs for the building were executed by the Minneapolis architectural firm of Bell & Detweiler, who gave the building similar features to the Montana State Capitol in Helena, Montana. The planning and construction cost was almost $1 million.

In 1921 plans began for a large addition located on the building's north side. Initial plans for the Capitol Annex were prepared by Bell's later firm, Bell & Kinports. Construction costs were estimated at $500,000. This project was not built and later Perkins & McWayne of Sioux Falls were chosen as architects. Construction drawings were issued in 1931, and the Annex project was completed in 1932.

== Features ==
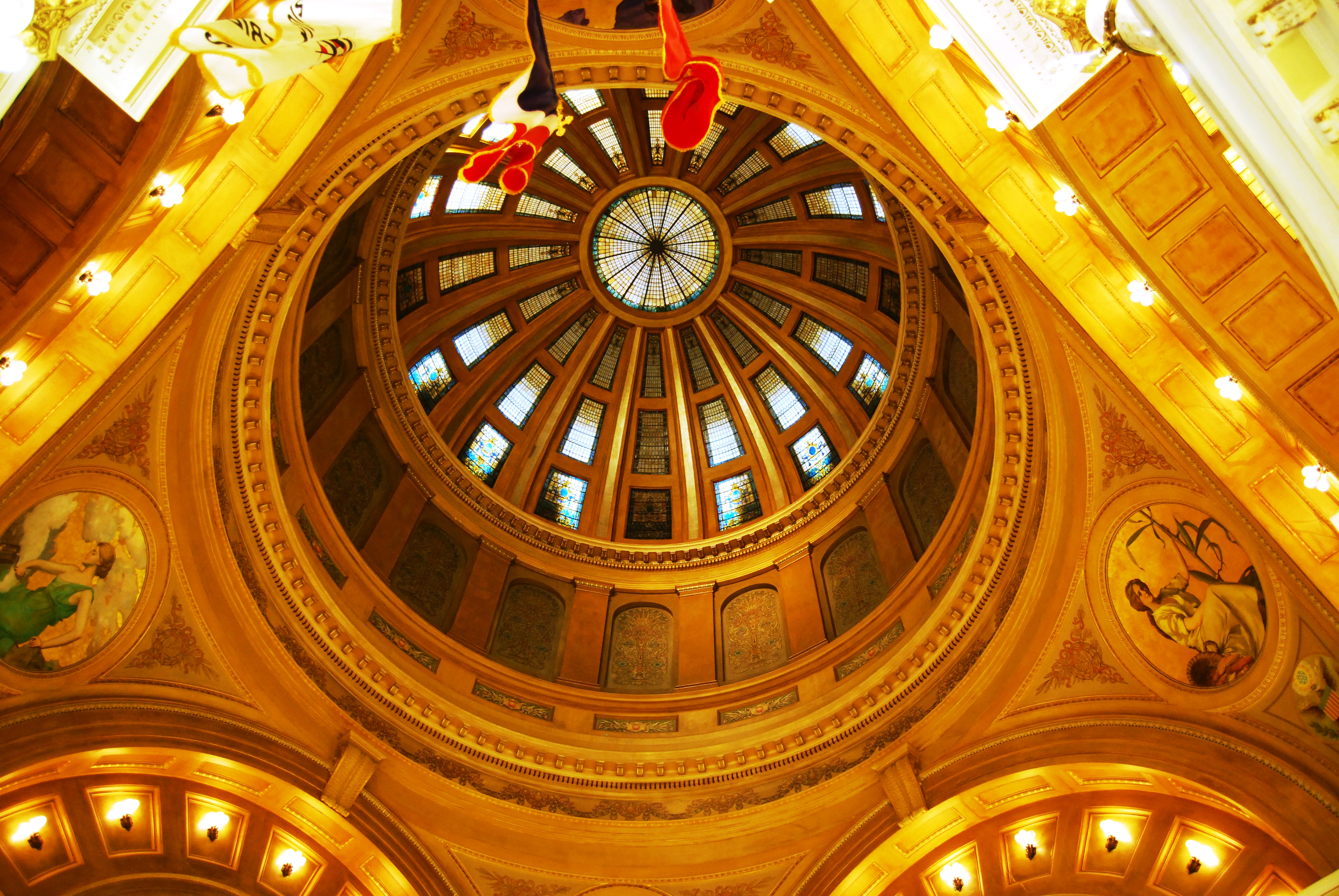
Rotunda

The floor in the capitol building is made of terrazzo tile. Common lore says the floor was laid by 66 Italian artists. To give these artists a chance to place a mark in the building (without allowing them to actually sign their names to the floor), each is said to have been given a blue stone to place in the floor. Only 55 of these tiles have been found, however. It is thought that the remaining stones may have been placed in locations now covered by walls, doors, or carpeting.

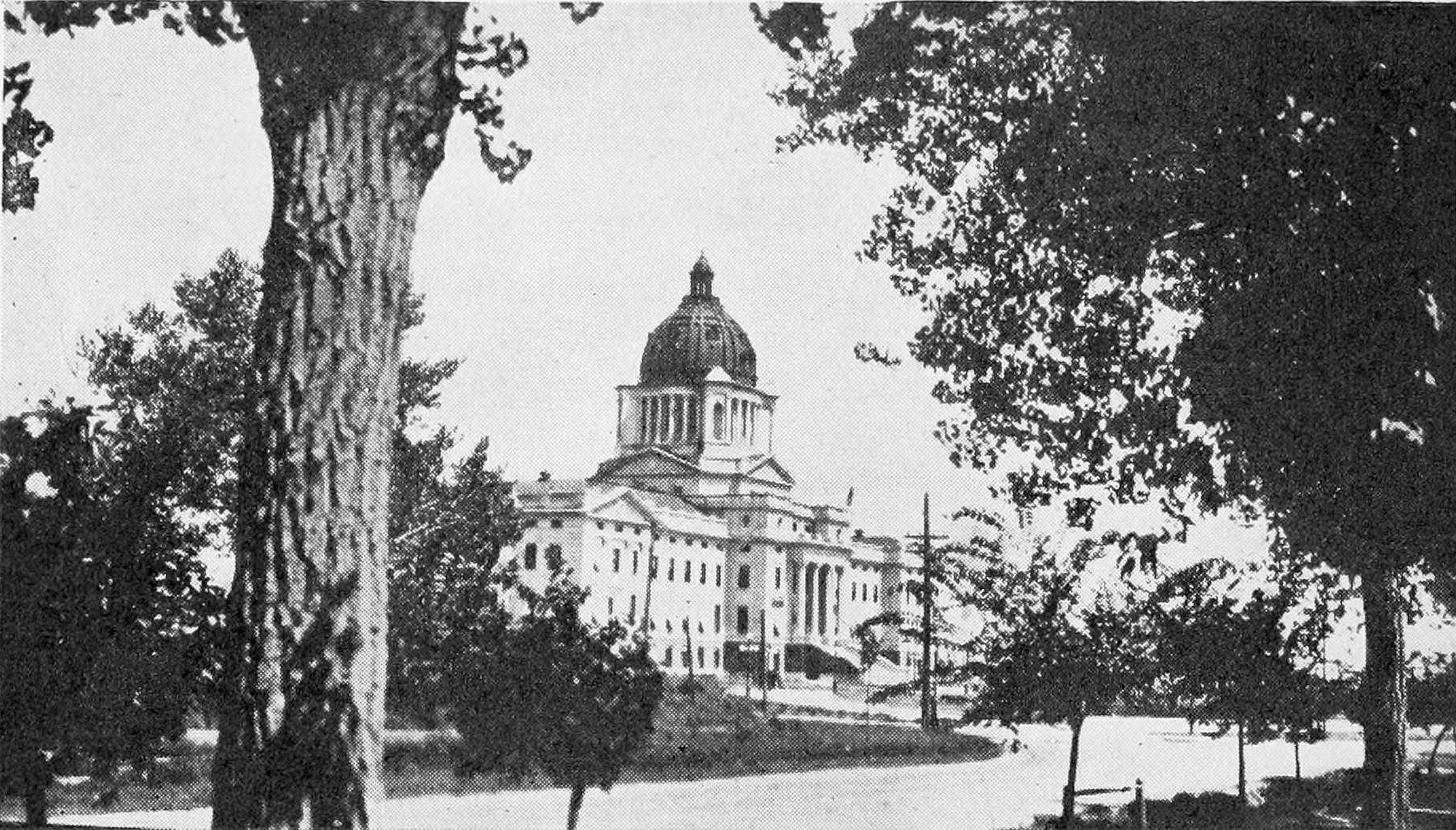
1919

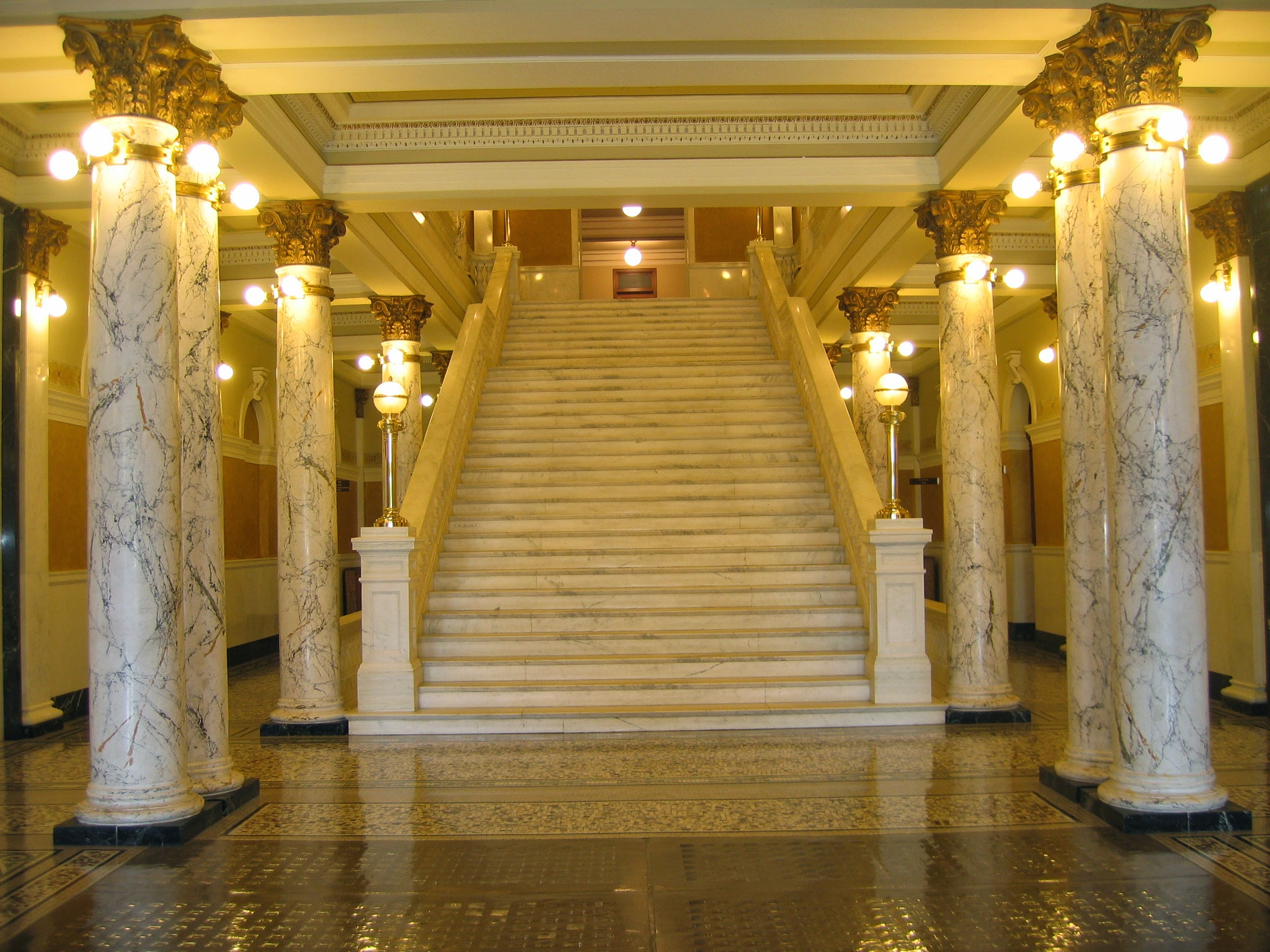
Staircase

From the first floor, a marble staircase leads upstairs. In front of the staircase, display cases house the First Lady Gown Collection. Miniature replicas have been made of the gown worn by each first lady to the state inaugural ball. These replicas are worn by dolls in the display case. Along with the doll, a picture of each governor's family and other mementos are also displayed.

On the second floor, the marble staircase leads into a rotunda. The dome of the rotunda is 96 feet high. The bottom ring is designed to resemble a string of ribbons joined, which is meant to symbolize the eternal nature of government. The 3rd pillar from the top on the right side of the railing is upside down due to a mistake during construction of the staircase. The interior of the dome is decorated with sixteen images of the Tree of Life. The dome also displays acanthus leaves to represent wisdom and a pasque flower, which is the state flower.

The third floor houses the state's House of Representatives and the state's Senate. The galleries for both, from which the public can observe the legislative process, are located on the fourth floor.

== Exterior memorials ==
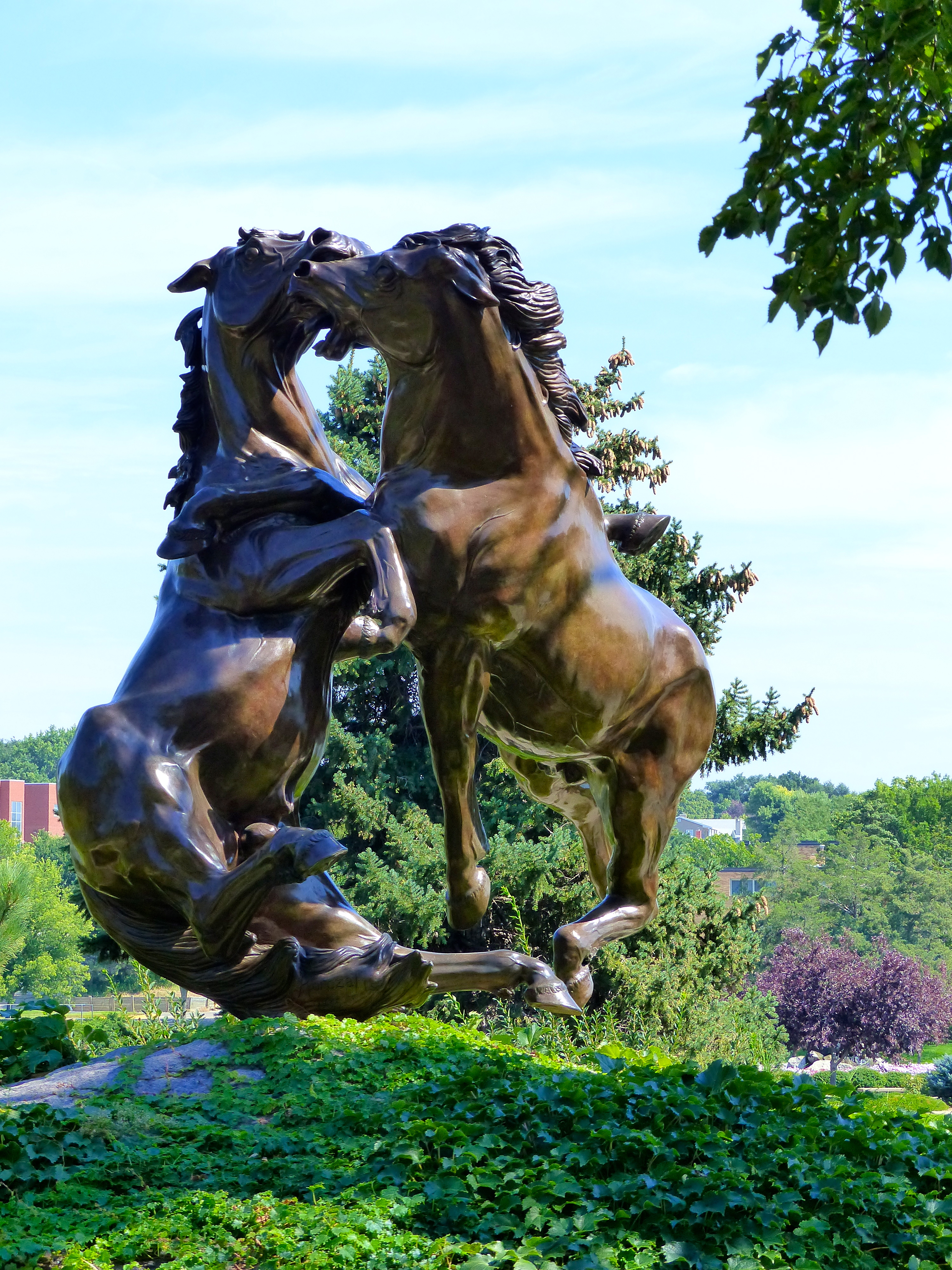
The Fighting Stallions Memorial

Four memorials are on the grounds of the capitol building. The Fighting Stallions Memorial is a sculpture built to honor the eight South Dakota residents, including Governor George S. Mickelson, who died in an airplane crash on April 19, 1993. The Flaming Fountain Memorial is a fountain with a perpetually burning natural gas flame. It was installed to honor South Dakotan veterans. The Law Enforcement Officer Memorial pays tribute to police officers who have died in the line of duty. Six bronze figures on a peninsula in the Capitol Lake comprise the World War II Memorial; each represents one of the branches of service in which South Dakota residents served during World War II, with additional statues commemorating veterans of the Korean War and the Vietnam War.

In addition to those four memorials, several statues on the Trail of Governors, which includes bronze statues of each of the state's former governors, are placed on the capitol grounds.

== Renovation ==
In anticipation of South Dakota's state centennial during 1989, the building was renovated extensively and restored during the administrations of Governors Richard F. Kneip, Harvey L. Wollman, Bill Janklow, and George S. Mickelson. The renovation required 22 years and restored much of the building and its decoration, including the tile floor, to its original appearance. The tiled floor was also repaired; each of the tile workers who did the repairs is said to have been given a heart-shaped stone with which to mark the new floor, as the original workers had. Work began in 2013 to restore stained glass throughout the building with the $2.7 million project concluded in time for South Dakota's 125th Anniversary celebrations on October 1.

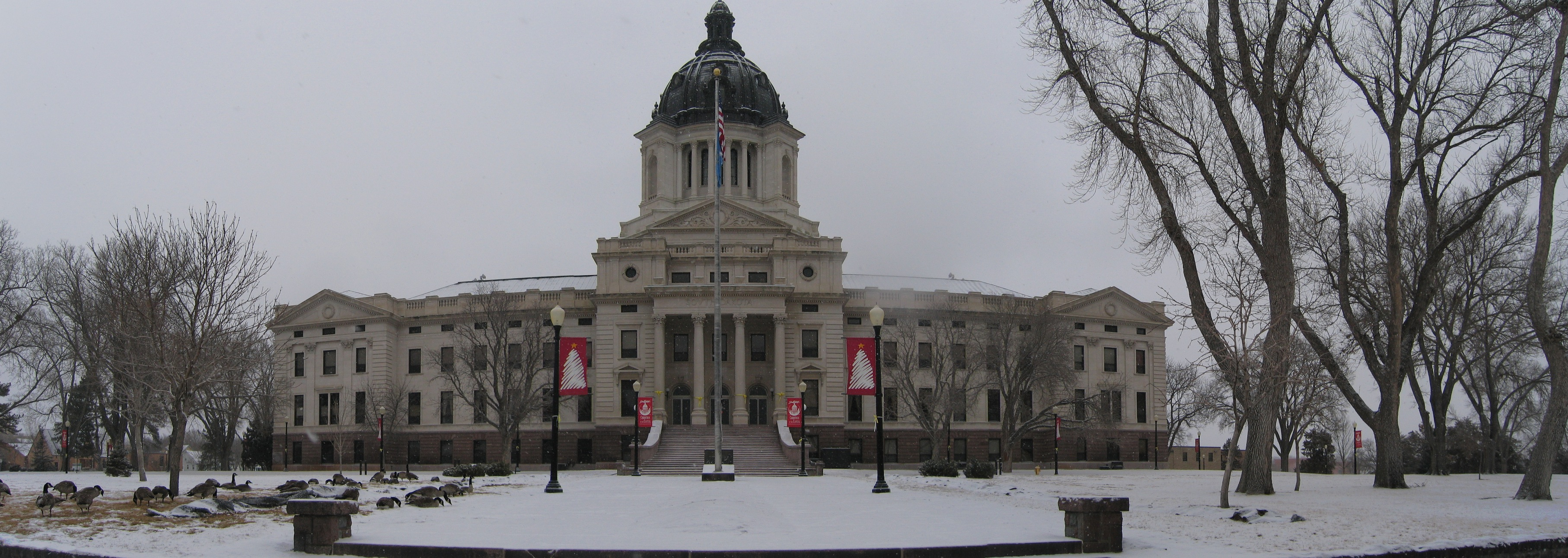
January 2005

== See also ==
- List of South Dakota state legislatures
- List of state and territorial capitols in the United States
