= Deer Lodge County Courthouse =

- U.S. National Register of Historic Places
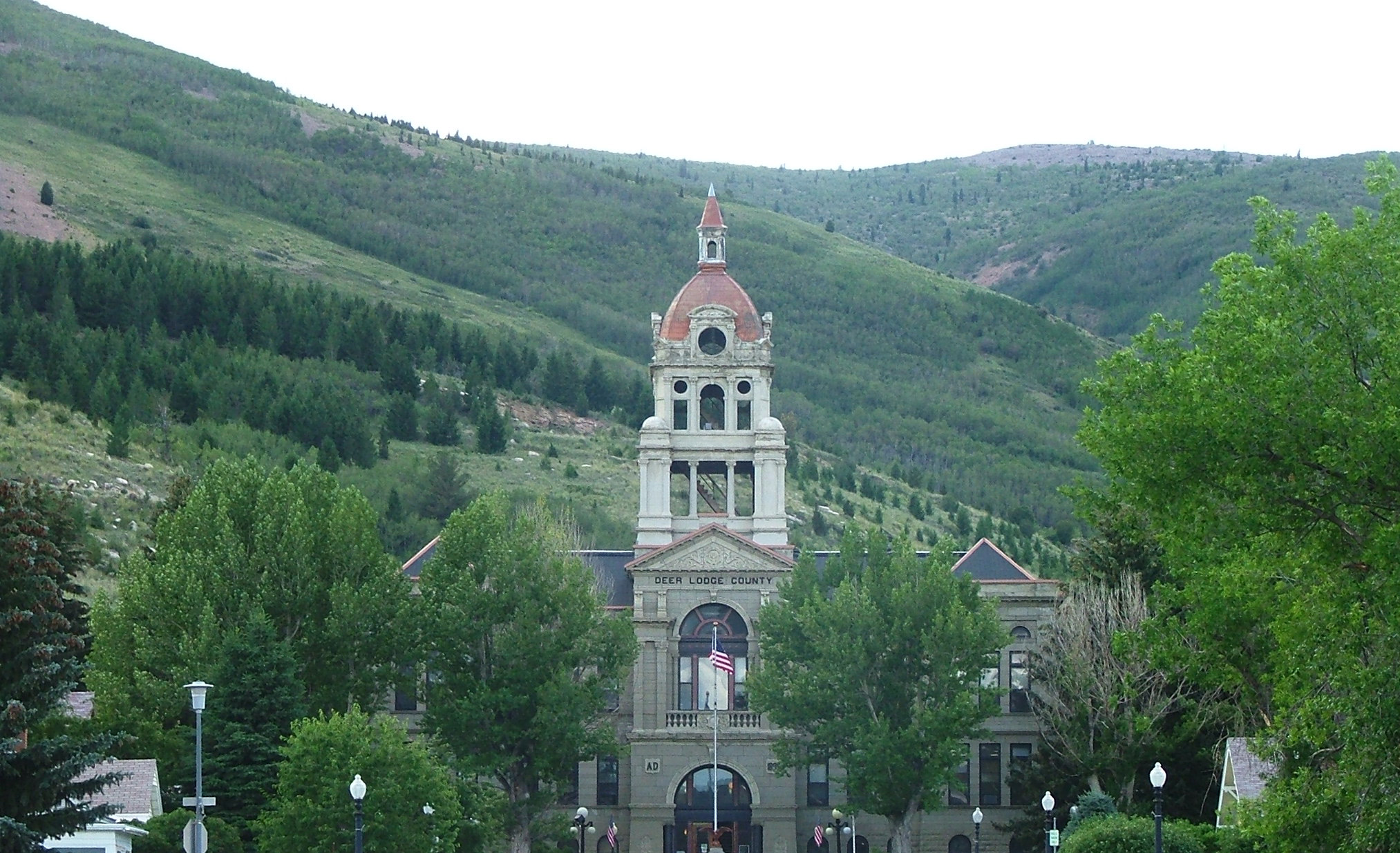

- Location within Montana
- Interactive map showing the location of Deer Lodge County Courthouse
- Location: U.S. 10, Anaconda, Montana
- Coordinates: 46°07′21″N 112°57′18″W
- Area: 4.1 acres (1.7 ha)
- Built: 1898
- Built by: Dolan & Hamill
- Architect: Bell & Kent
- NRHP reference No.: 78001681
- Added to NRHP: December 29, 1978

The Deer Lodge County Courthouse, in Anaconda, Montana, was built 1898-1899 and dedicated April 1, 1900. It was listed on the National Register of Historic Places in 1978.

It was designed by architects Bell & Kent (Charles E. Bell and John N. Kent of Helena) and was built by contractors Dolan & Hamill.

It has an eight part dome.

It is located on a low hill at the south end of Main St.
