= Fulton County Courthouse (Illinois) =

Coordinates: 40°23′49″N 90°9′20″W

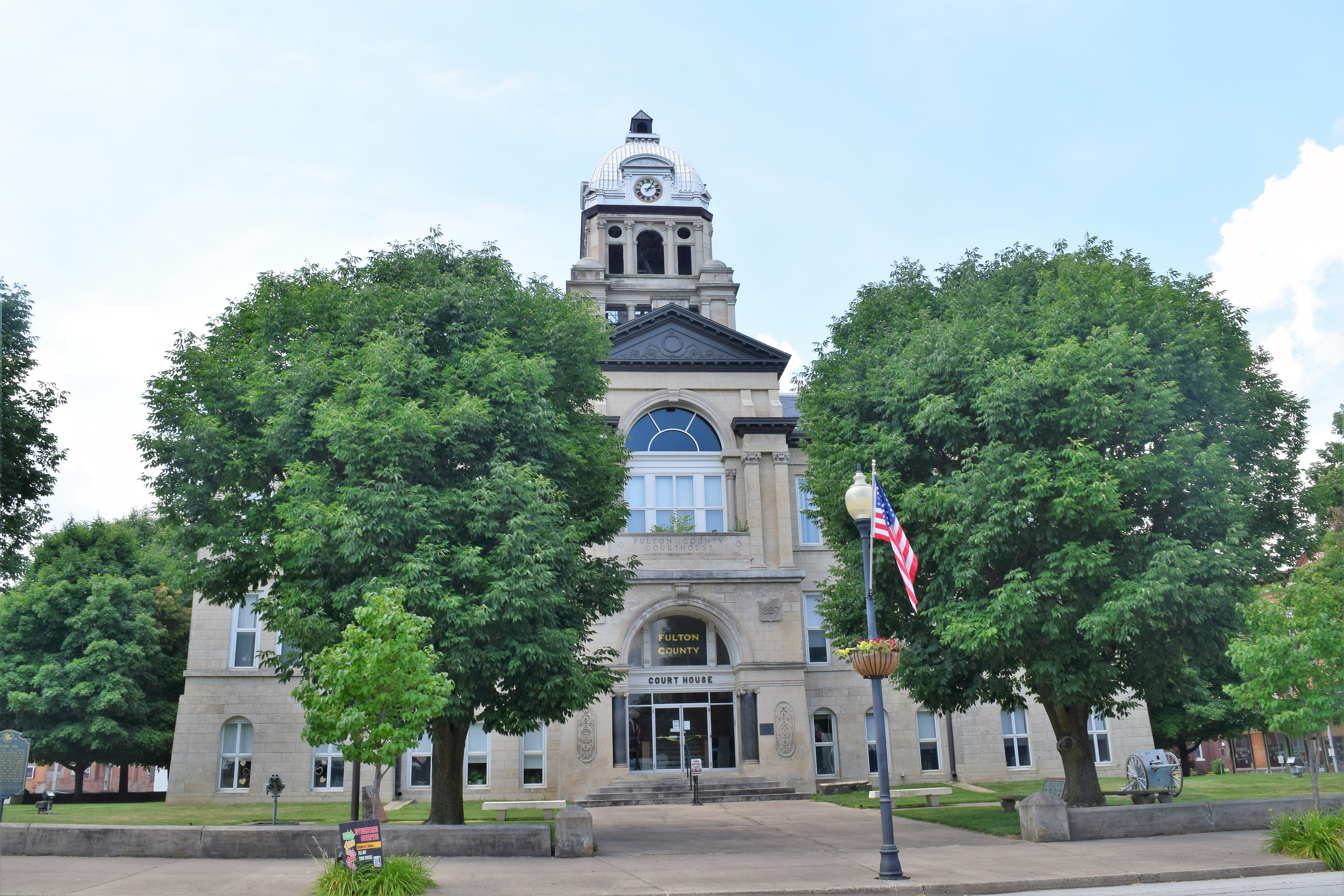
The Fulton County Courthouse in Lewistown, Illinois, the county seat of Fulton County, Illinois.

The Fulton County Courthouse is the courthouse of Fulton County, Illinois. Its court sessions hear cases in the 9th circuit of Illinois judicial district 4. The county courthouse is located at 100 North Main Street in the county seat of Lewistown. The courthouse is also the seat of Fulton County government operations.

== History ==
The Fulton County courthouse, of which the east-facing section was built in 1897–1898, is a Beaux-Arts structure with a façade of cut limestone. A building theme of welcoming archways is repeated at the main entrance, on an upper floor with a large ceremonial window, and on the building's cupola and clock tower.

In the 1970s, Fulton County built a major addition to the west of the original building. The limestone addition maintains the height lines and much of the style of the original courthouse.

Three earlier Fulton County courthouses have disappeared. The first courthouse was a log cabin (1823); the second was a frame structure (1826, cost $649), and the third was a wood, brick, and stone courthouse (1837–1838, cost $9,000).

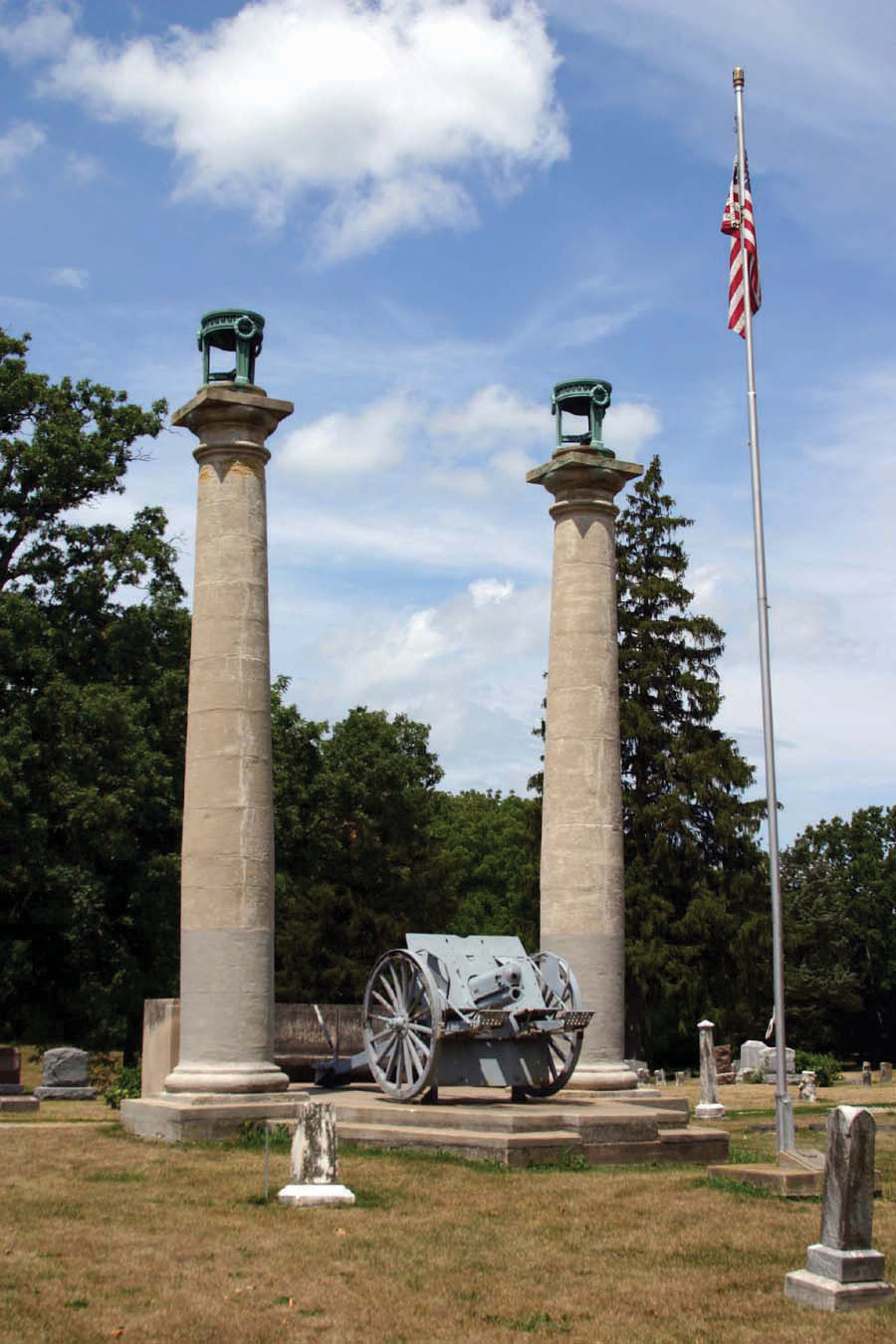
Columns from the 3rd Fulton County courthouse, located in the Oak Hill Cemetery in Lewistown, Illinois

=== Edgar Lee Masters ===
The razed third courthouse was extensively referenced by onetime local resident Edgar Lee Masters, who was also a practicing attorney. Masters used local locations, including the courthouse, in his poetic cycle Spoon River Anthology (1915). Spoon River flows through Fulton County, and the poet repeatedly refers to the futility of legal ethics as compared to the omnipotent cycles of creation and destruction. The destruction of the third courthouse by arson on December 13, 1894, is described as an example and allegory of this point of view. Although they had mixed feelings about Masters himself, the people of Lewistown understood this perspective. They hauled two large surviving stone columns from the razed courthouse to stand sentinel at the local Oak Hill Cemetery, a focal location of the “Anthology.”
