= Manchester, Iowa =

- City
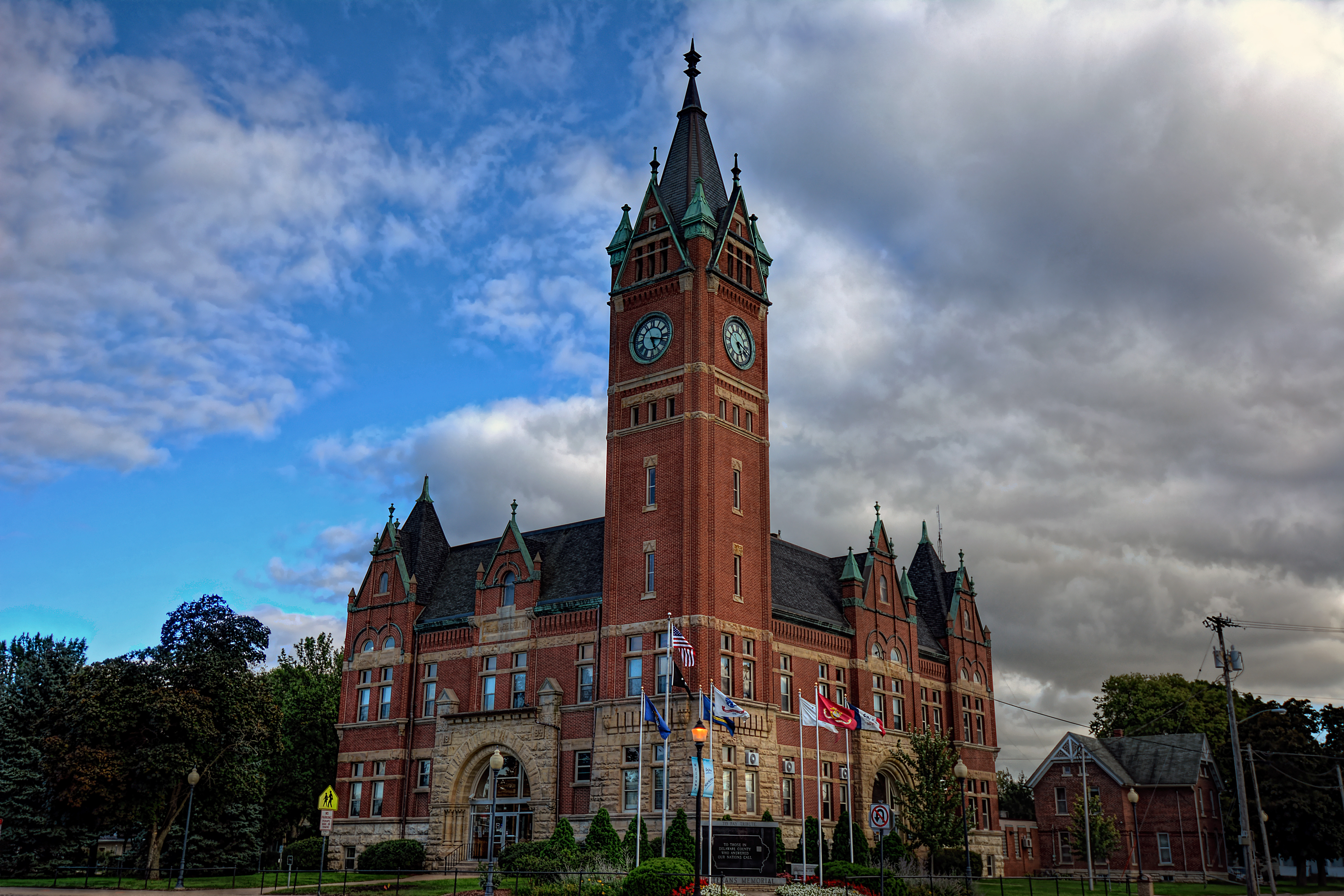
- Delaware County Courthouse in Manchester

- Location of Manchester, Iowa
- Coordinates: 42°29′38″N 91°27′21″W
- Country: United States
- State: Iowa
- County: Delaware
- Incorporated: March 19, 1864

Area
  - Total: 4.89 sq mi (12.67 km^{2})
  - Land: 4.89 sq mi (12.67 km^{2})
  - Water: 0.24 sq mi (0.61 km^{2})
- Elevation: 938 ft (286 m)

Population (2020)
  - Total: 5,065
  - Density: 1,047.0/sq mi (404.23/km^{2})
- Time zone: UTC-6 (Central (CST))
  - Summer (DST): UTC-5 (CDT)
- ZIP code: 52057
- Area code: 563
- FIPS code: 19-48810
- GNIS ID: 2395826
- Website: manchester-ia.org

Manchester is a city in Delaware Township and the county seat of Delaware County, Iowa, United States. The population was 5,065 at the time of the 2020 census. Manchester is located at the intersection of U.S. Route 20 and State Highway 13 and is the largest community in Delaware County. It is home to the Delaware County Fair.

== History ==
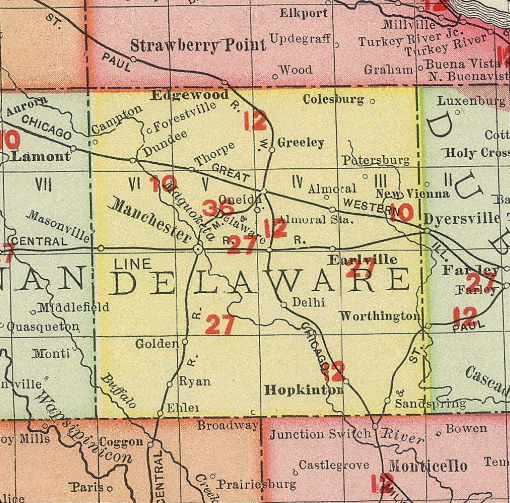
Manchester in central Delaware County, Iowa, in 1903

Manchester was founded in the 1850s. It was originally called Burrington after its founder, Levings Burrington, who settled there in 1852. The name was subsequently changed to Manchester.

The county courthouse was built in 1894 for $38,000. The clock in the tower was paid for with contributions from 700 county citizens. C.E. Bell designed the Romanesque Revival building,[1] which is constructed of red pressed brick. The main body of the building measures 76 by 100 feet.[3] The tower and spire are 135 feet (41 m) high, and the walls of the building are 18 inches (45.7 cm) thick.[3] The decorative metal ceilings on the first floor and the elaborate woodwork are original to the building. It was listed on the National Register of Historic Places in 1981 as a part of the County Courthouses in Iowa Thematic Resource.

== Geography ==
The community is located along the Maquoketa River. According to the United States Census Bureau, the city has a total area of 4.70 square miles (12.17 km^{2}), of which 4.68 square miles (12.12 km^{2}) is land and 0.02 square miles (0.05 km^{2}) is water.

== Demographics ==
Historical population

Year	Pop.	±%
1870	1,492	—
1880	2,275	+52.5%
1890	2,344	+3.0%
1900	2,887	+23.2%
1910	2,758	−4.5%
1920	3,111	+12.8%
1930	3,413	+9.7%
1940	3,762	+10.2%

Year	Pop.	±%
1950	3,987	+6.0%
1960	4,402	+10.4%
1970	4,641	+5.4%
1980	4,942	+6.5%
1990	5,137	+3.9%
2000	5,257	+2.3%
2010	5,179	−1.5%
2020	5,065	−2.2%

Source: "U.S. Census website". United States Census Bureau.
U.S. Decennial Census

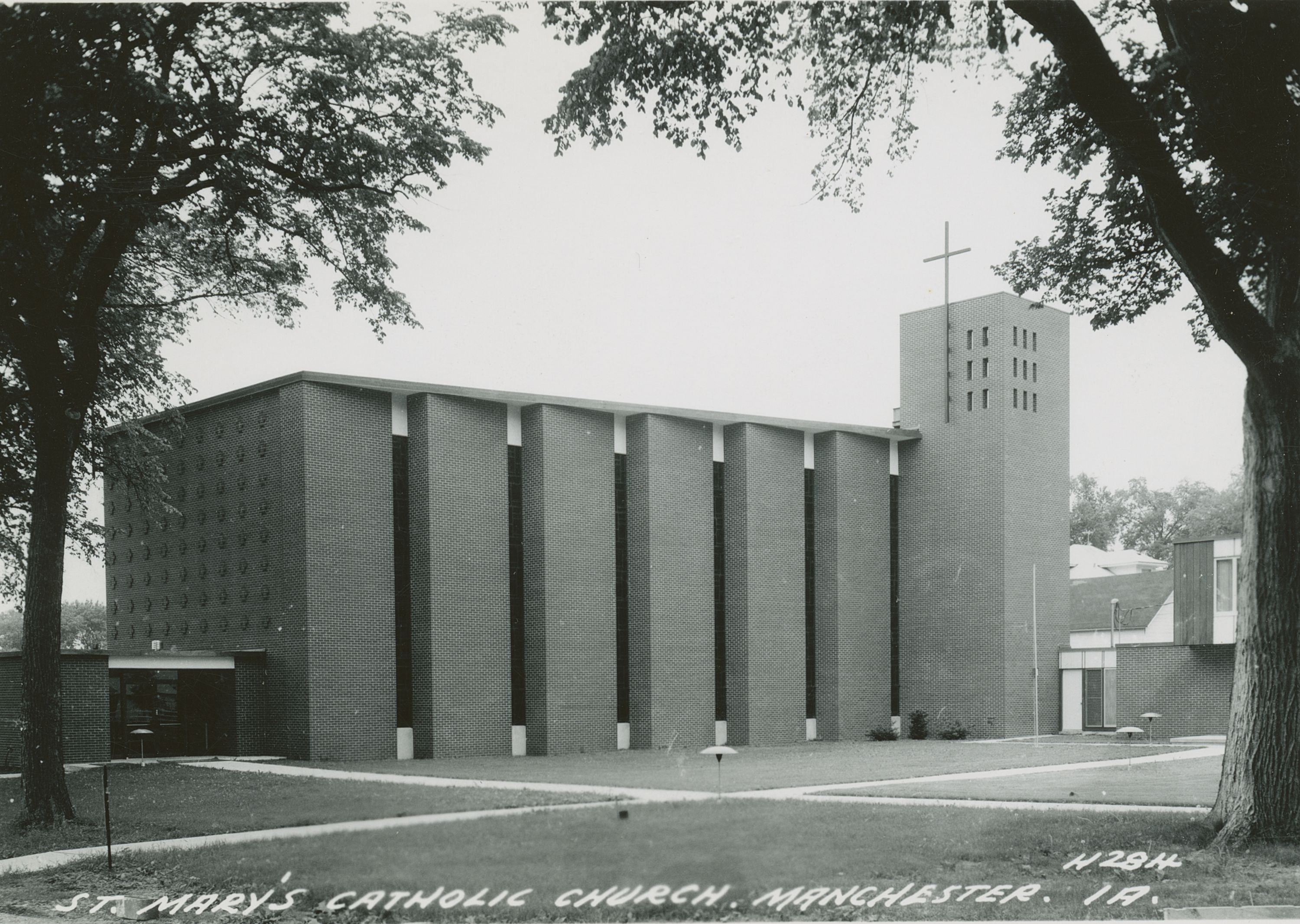
St. Mary's Catholic Church, Manchester, Iowa

=== 2020 census ===
As of the 2020 census, Manchester had a population of 5,065, with 2,228 households and 1,312 families residing in the city. The population density was 1,047.0 inhabitants per square mile (404.2/km^{2}). There were 2,395 housing units at an average density of 495.1 per square mile (191.1/km^{2}).

The median age was 43.9 years. 22.0% of residents were under the age of 18 and 24.5% were 65 years of age or older. Residents aged 20 to 24 made up 5.2% of the population, those aged 25 to 44 were 21.8%, and those aged 45 to 64 were 24.7%. For every 100 females there were 94.7 males, and for every 100 females age 18 and over there were 89.0 males age 18 and over.

95.4% of residents lived in urban areas, while 4.6% lived in rural areas.

Of the 2,228 households, 25.1% had children under the age of 18 living in them. Of all households, 44.3% were married-couple households, 19.7% were households with a male householder and no spouse or partner present, and 30.3% were households with a female householder and no spouse or partner present. About 41.1% of households were non-families, 36.6% were made up of individuals, and 18.8% had someone living alone who was 65 years of age or older.

There were 2,395 housing units, of which 7.0% were vacant. The homeowner vacancy rate was 2.2% and the rental vacancy rate was 6.5%.

Racial composition as of the 2020 census
Race	Number	Percent
White	4,712	93.0%
Black or African American	90	1.8%
American Indian and Alaska Native	26	0.5%
Asian	23	0.5%
Native Hawaiian and Other Pacific Islander	0	0.0%
Some other race	42	0.8%
Two or more races	172	3.4%
Hispanic or Latino (of any race)	109	2.2%

=== 2010 census ===
As of the census of 2010, there were 5,179 people, 2,199 households, and 1,391 families living in the city. The population density was 1,106.6 inhabitants per square mile (427.3/km^{2}). There were 2,341 housing units at an average density of 500.2 per square mile (193.1/km^{2}). The racial makeup of the city was 97.7% White, 0.6% African American, 0.3% Native American, 0.4% Asian, 0.2% from other races, and 0.8% from two or more races. Hispanic or Latino of any race made up 0.9% of the population.

There were 2,199 households, of which 30.0% had children under the age of 18 living with them, 49.5% were married couples living together, 10.3% had a female householder with no husband present, 3.5% had a male householder with no wife present, and 36.7% were non-families. 32.3% of all households were made up of individuals, and 15.3% had someone living alone who was 65 years of age or older. The average household size was 2.31 and the average family size was 2.91.

The median age in the city was 41.1 years. 24.9% of residents were under the age of 18; 7% were between the ages of 18 and 24; 22.8% were from 25 to 44; 25.2% were from 45 to 64; and 20.1% were 65 years of age or older. The gender makeup of the city was 47.4% male and 52.6% female.

=== 2000 census ===
As of the census of 2000, there were 5,257 people, 2,167 households, and 1,397 families living in the city. The population density was 1,274.0 inhabitants per square mile (491.9/km^{2}). There were 2,315 housing units at an average density of 561.0 per square mile (216.6/km^{2}). The racial makeup of the city was 98.99% White, 0.10% African American, 0.15% Native American, 0.27% Asian, 0.04% Pacific Islander, 0.06% from other races, and 0.40% from two or more races. Hispanic or Latino of any race were 0.82% of the population.

There were 2,167 households, out of which 31.7% had children under the age of 18 living with them, 52.3% were married couples living together, 9.3% had a female householder with no husband present, and 35.5% were non-families. 31.6% of all households were made up of individuals, and 15.4% had someone living alone who was 65 years of age or older. The average household size was 2.36 and the average family size was 2.99.

Age spread: 26.2% under the age of 18, 7.6% from 18 to 24, 26.6% from 25 to 44, 19.6% from 45 to 64, and 20.0% who were 65 years of age or older. The median age was 38 years. For every 100 females, there were 87.5 males. For every 100 females age 18 and over, there were 82.4 males.

The median income for a household in the city was $31,099, and the median income for a family was $39,219. Males had a median income of $33,506 versus $17,990 for females. The per capita income for the city was $18,811. About 8.4% of families and 9.8% of the population were below the poverty line, including 12.0% of those under age 18 and 10.5% of those age 65 or over.

== Economy ==
Manchester's largest area employers include; XL Specialized Trailers, Henderson Products, Regional Medical Center, and West Delaware Community School District, with many other strong small businesses throughout Delaware County. Agriculture is a major component of the local economy.

== Notable people ==
- Robert Gallery (born 1980), American football player
- Elizabeth Wilson (born 1964), politician
- Brooks Wheelan (born 1986), comedian
- Frank H. Wheeler (1864–1921), industrialist
