= Effingham County Courthouse =

Effingham County Courthouse may refer either of two former courthouses:

- Old Effingham County Courthouse, Springfield, Georgia
- Effingham County Cultural Center and Museum, Effingham, Illinois
