= Effingham County Cultural Center and Museum =

Historic place in Illinois, United States

- Effingham County Courthouse
- U.S. National Register of Historic Places
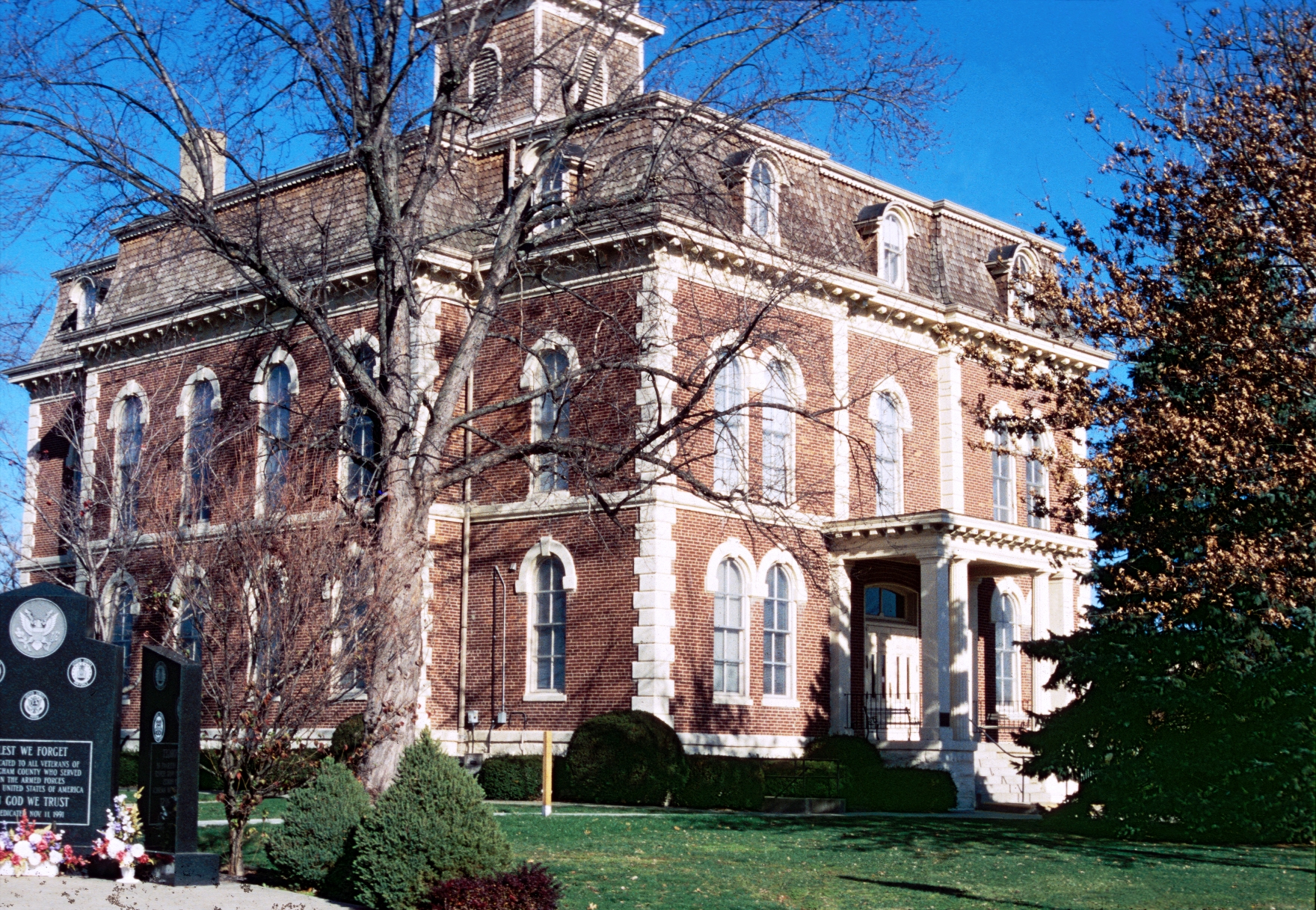
- The Effingham County Courthouse in 2006

- Location within Illinois
- Interactive map showing the location for Effingham County Courthouse
- Location: 100 E. Jefferson St., Effingham, Illinois
- Coordinates: 39°7′18.001″N 88°32′28.000″W
- Area: 0.8 acres (0.32 ha)
- Built: 1871
- NRHP reference No.: 85002304
- Added to NRHP: September 11, 1985

The Effingham County Cultural Center and Museum is a historic building and museum located in Effingham, the county seat of Effingham County, Illinois. Built in 1871, the building was originally the Effingham County Courthouse.

== Museum Mission ==
The mission of the Effingham County Museum is to preserve our Historic Register structure, to collect artifacts from county history, and to use them both to educate our local and external communities, while immersed in the broader context of American history.

=== Effingham County demographics ===
Effingham County, Illinois, covers 486 square miles and had a population of 34,668 people in the 2020 census. The city of Effingham Illinois is the county seat. There is one other city, Altamont. In addition, Effingham County has one town (Mason) and seven villages (Beecher City, Dieterich, Edgewood, Montrose, Shumway, Teutopolis, and Watson). There are 47 cemeteries. Each city, town, village and cemetery has a unique history for County Museum historians to investigate and highlight. There are five surrounding contiguous counties (Clay, Cumberland, Fayette, Jasper, and Shelby), with populations ranging from 10,450 (Cumberland and Jasper) to 21,488 people (Fayette).

== The site ==
The museum is located on the town square in the center of Effingham. It is owned and maintained by the county. It consists of approximately 1.9 acres bounded by East Washington Street to the north, East Jefferson Street to the south, 3rd Street to the west, and 4th Street to the east. It is set back about 100 feet from the street. Sidewalks extend from the north and south entrances, with the primary entrance located on the south end. East of the building is a parking lot, which has two accessible parking spaces near the side entrance. The lot extends to the accessible side entrance.

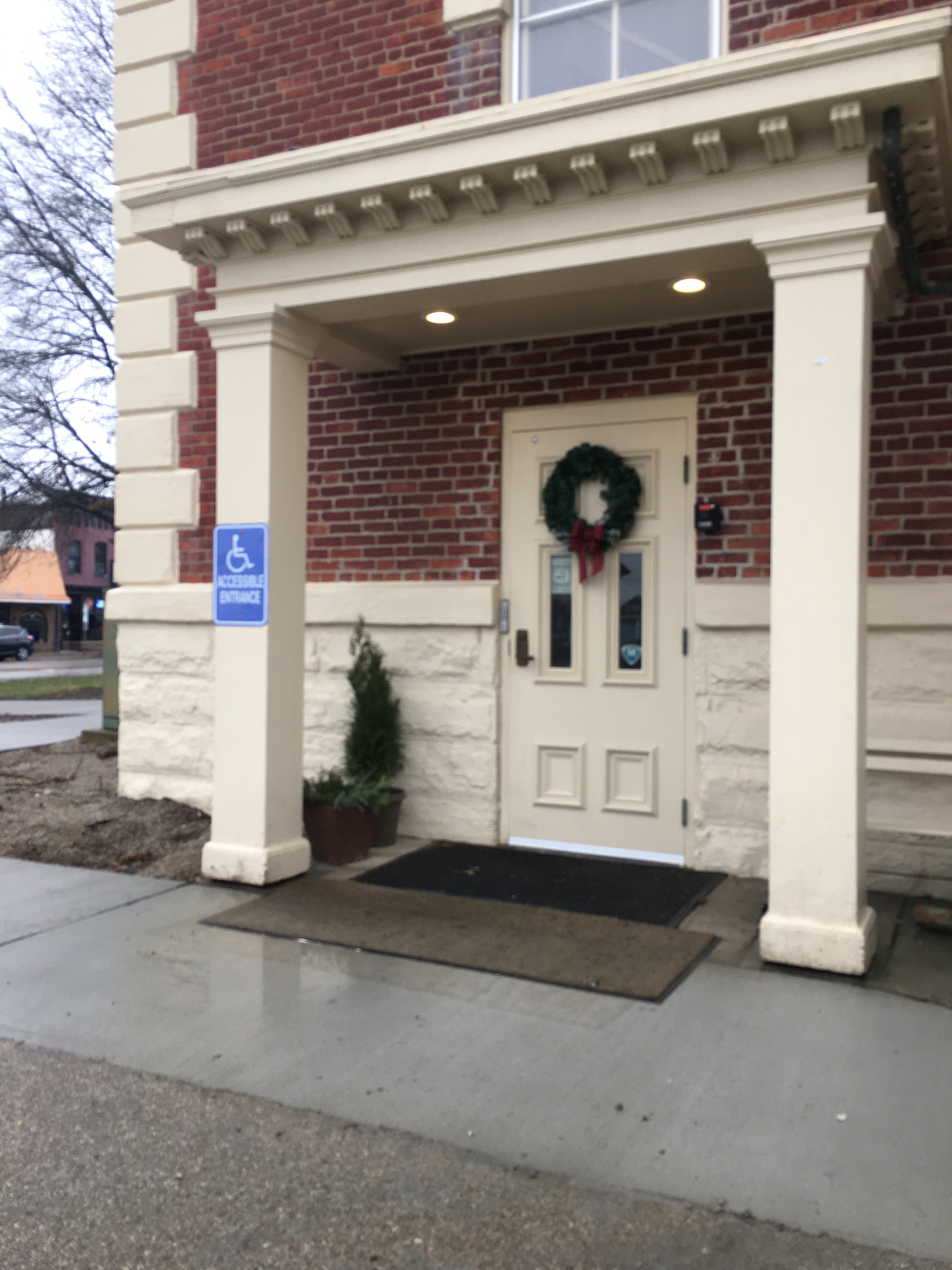
East door just next to accessible parking

A pavilion with a flat cement floor was constructed to the northwest of the museum in 2025. It replaced a wood gazebo with steps that had been in the same general area.

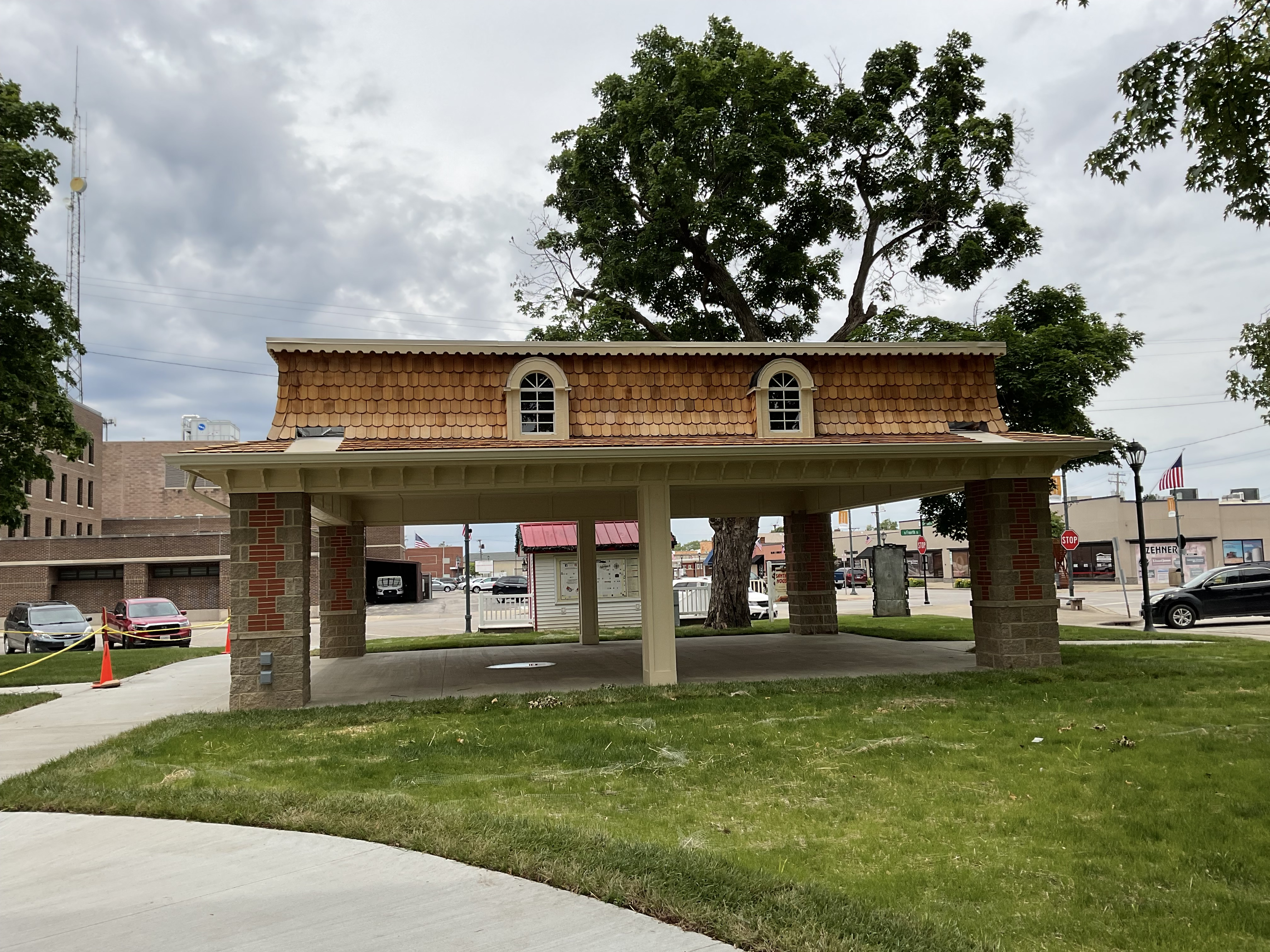
Pavilion on grounds Effingham County Museum, added 2025

== Construction history ==
The courthouse was started in 1870 and completed in 1871 at a cost of roughly $30,000. Its style is known as Second Empire, a style popular in the United States during the latter part of the nineteenth century, coming from France's Second Empire period of the late 18th century. There have been two minor changes to the exterior; in 1913 the bell tower was changed from the Second Empire style to a simple square with a pyramidal roof; and somewhat later the southeast exterior door was changed to permit handicapped access and a small porch roof was added to shelter the door.

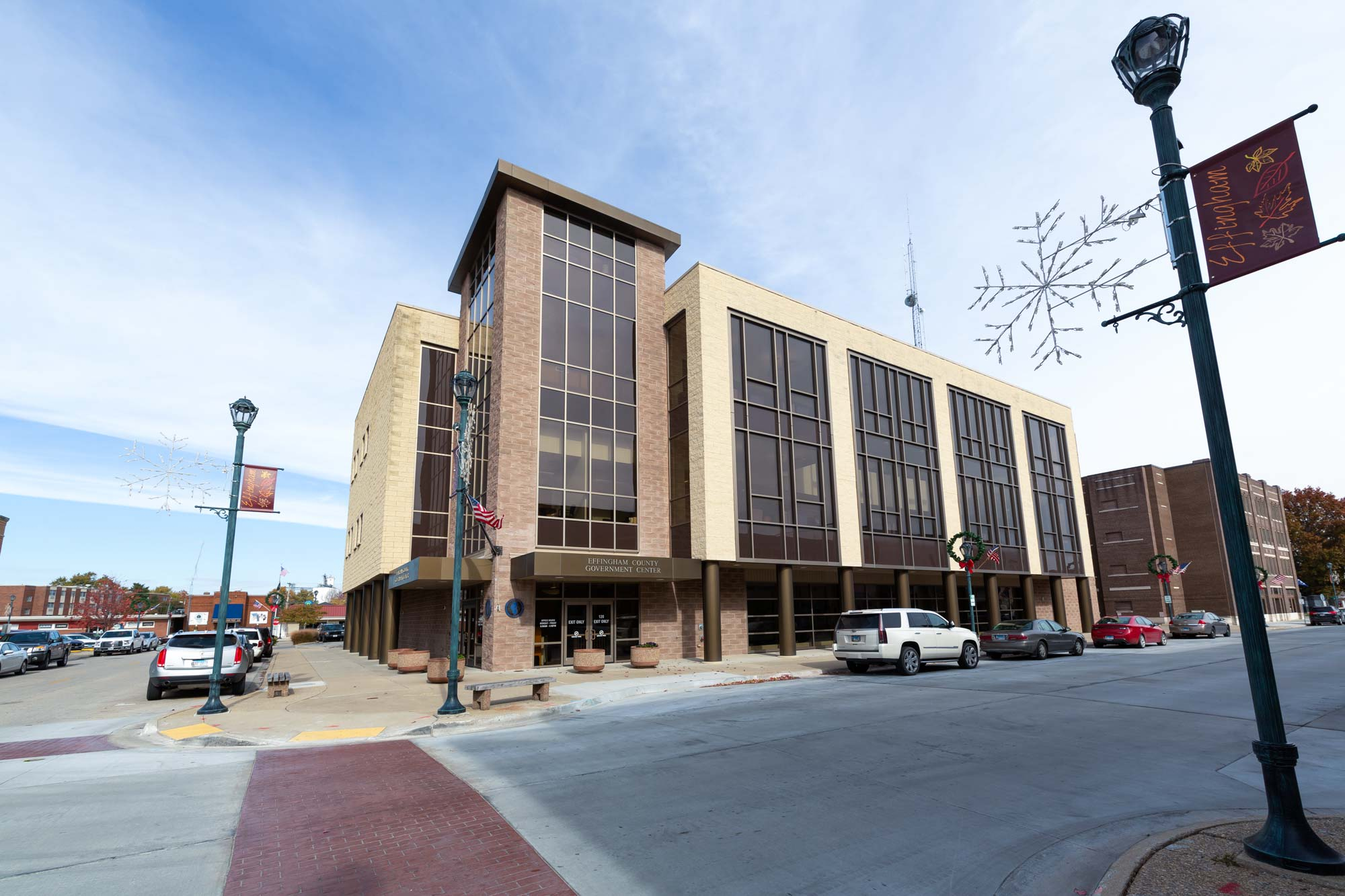
Effingham County Government Center on Jefferson Avenue

In 2007, Effingham County constructed a new building, named the Effingham County Government Center, one block west of the 1871 courthouse, at which point the old courthouse was not longer used. Beginning in 2012, the old courthouse began use as a museum.

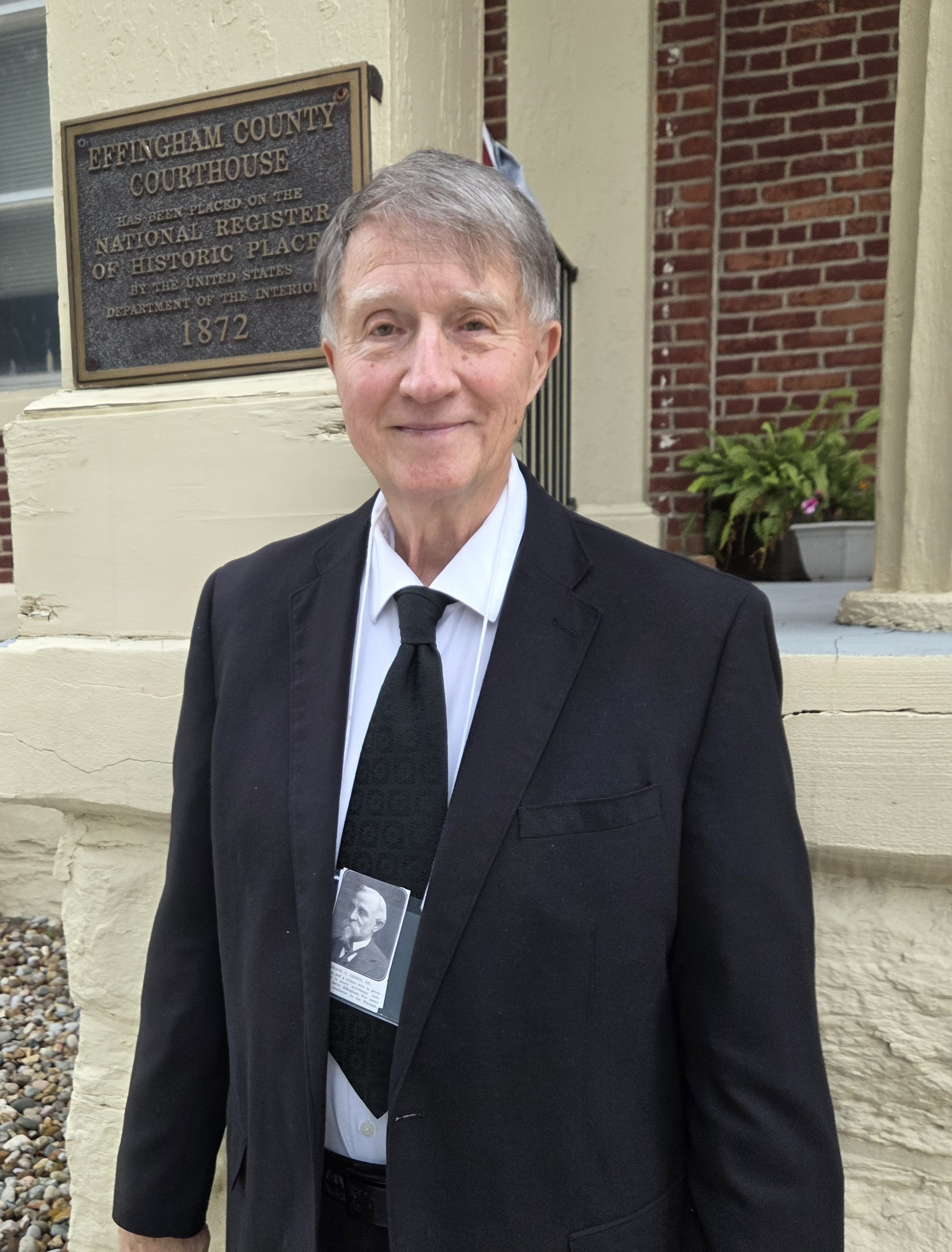
Phil Lewis applied for the National Register of Historic Places status

The building has been listed on the US National Register of Historic Places since September 1985.

== Exterior architecture ==
The exterior of the Effingham County Museum in Effingham, Illinois is composed primary of red brick, set on a rusticated stone basement, with an attic under a mansard roof and with a clock tower above all. The structure is roughly rectangular in shape. The north and south bays are set back, as are the north and south entrances. The building's corners are smooth stone quoining. The corner's edges are chamfered.

It appears that the stone may be sandstone at the foundation, and limestone elsewhere. The windows consist of individual and paired tall double-hung wood units, which are set into masonry arches. The second floor courtroom windows are taller than the others; this reflects the high ceiling of the courtroom itself. Round top wood double-hung windows are set into hooded dormers at the attic level. The basement windows in the foundation are aligned with the windows above them.

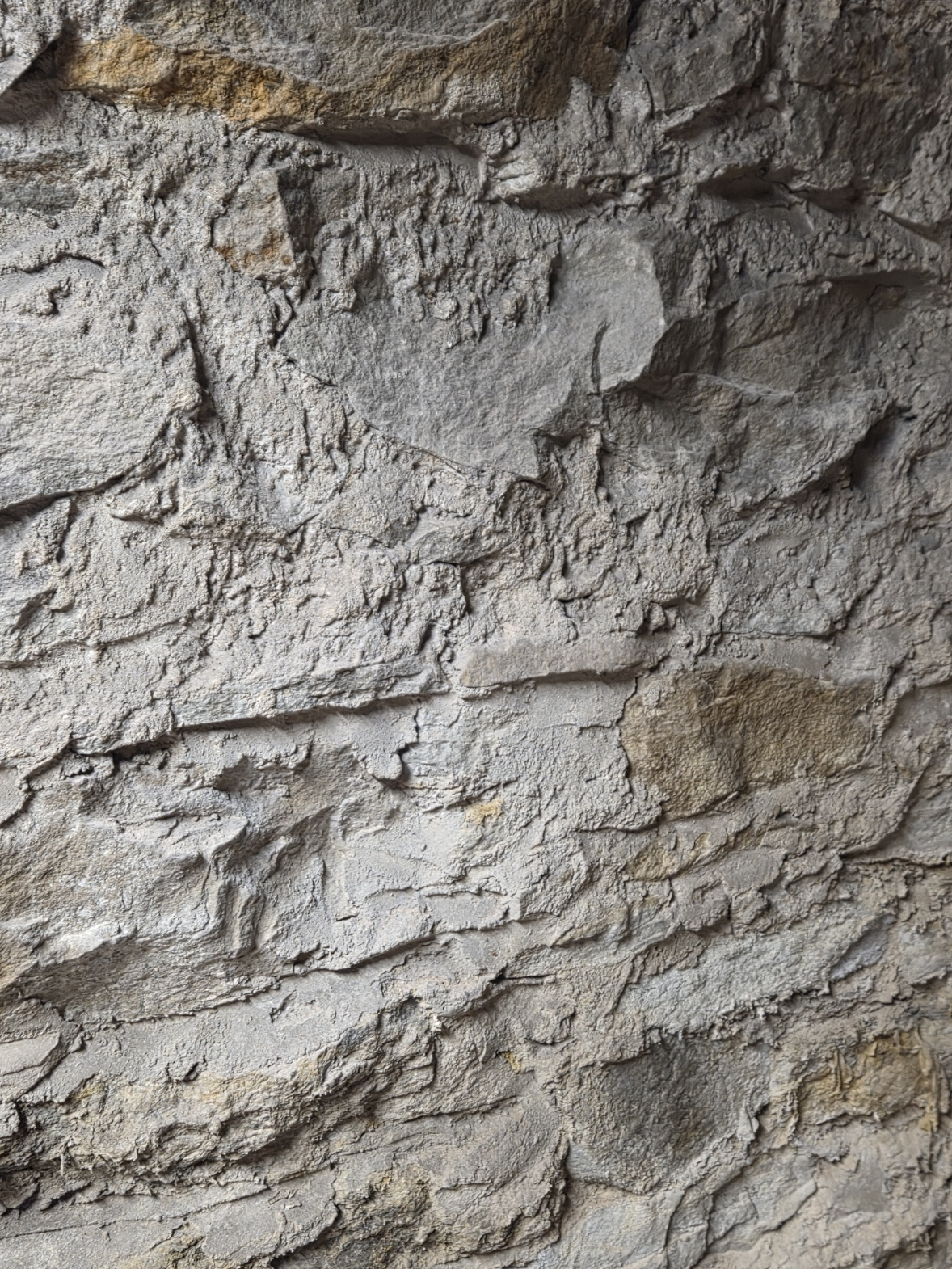
Sandstone basement wall, Effingham County Museum

The shallow pitched roof and tower roof are surfaced with black synthetic rubber membrane material. The mansard roof and tower sides are clad in decorative roundwood shingles (circa 1980), which is a digression from the original tow-tone slate shingles which were installed in a banded pattern. The brick exterior appears to have been sandblasted at some point, and after that, stained red. The mortar joints have all been repainted. The smooth surface stone units have been coated with a cementitious layer, and all the exterior stone has been painted. All the original wood windows have been replaced in wood, with exterior metal-framed storm windows applied. Windows on the first and second level match the originals. The attic windows match the originals, with the exception of the curved bottom rails of the lower sash.

== Interior architecture ==
The first and second floors and the north and south bays of the attic floors are supported by exterior and interior masonry walls supporting wooden floor joists. The tall ceiling of the second floor courtroom and the attic floor above is supported by wooden trusses spanning the courtroom from north to south. The tower is all wood frame construction.

On the basement and first floor levels, the interior plan is laid out with a center hall that extends north-south, with stairs at each end and rooms along each side. On the second floor, the courtroom occupies the large center portion with stairs and ancillary rooms to the north and south. The multi-level attic floor contains ancillary rooms at the north and south, bordering spaces arranged between the trusses spanning the high courtroom below it. At the center of at the attic is a plaster dome in the courtroom ceiling, and directly below the tower.

=== Interior changes made by the county ===
When occupied by the county, changes were made over the years. Those include a vault room on the first floor, elevator and new interior stairs to all the floors, major and minor changes to the courtroom and offices throughout, suspended ceilings with lay-in lighting, and new ductwork. At an unknown time, portions of the basement floor on the west end were lowered. Areas were separated with fire rated doors, including those on the first floor at the main hall that are on fusible link hold-open devices. Illuminated exit signs and emergency lighting were located throughout the building. The heating system was replaced with a heating and cooling unit. Electric service connection is below grade, and a bank of electric boxes with a meter is located to the side of the south entrance. A metered water service enters the building from the south.

== Transition to a Museum ==
The transition from left-behind-county-courthouse to county history museum began in earnest in July of 2010. On July 26, the President of the newly created non-profit entity (Effingham County Cultural Center and Museum Association, Inc.), and the Chair of the Effingham County Board signed a long-term lease agreement. At that point, the ECCCMA President verbalized the Association's determination to develop the building as an architecture gem, and to operate it in a way that would instill community pride and attract visitors. A Chicago, Illinois restorative architect, Dennis Langley, came to Effingham to demonstrate early support for the project. Mr. Langley had a personal tie to the community. His mother, Betty, had been employed in the Circuit Clerk's office when the structure was the county courthouse. One of his recommendation was to display a log from the National Road in a prominent place on the first floor.

=== Progress during 2011-2012 ===
Two major issues emerged in 2011-2012. Funding was essential to the success of the project and much of the group's 2011 effort was devoted to it.. Private donations from area individuals and businesses were the predominant sources. A preliminary estimate proposed that the conversion to a museum would cost $1.0 million. The volunteers chose to start with the first floor. Before they could begin, the second major issue had to be addressed, which was the removal of asbestos from the structure. Much of the funds gathered to date paid for that necessity.

In the interim, local historians prepared to preserve local history and artifacts. Two historians appeared before the Effingham County Board in July of 2011. They requested the return of original county records that were formerly stored in the old courthouse basement. The ledgers had been taken to Springfield, Illinois and microfilmed. The microfilms were sent to the nearest Illinois Regional Archive Depository (IRAD) in the Booth Library at Eastern Illinois University in Charleston, Illinois. The historians' request was based on the premise that the original ledgers were themselves valuable artifacts, and they asked that the records be brought back to Effingham County for safe and secure storage in the new county building's basement. Museum volunteers also learned to manage incoming artifacts by way of a training conducted by Pat Miller, Executive Director of the Illinois Heritage Association. In August of 2012, a two-day lecture, discussion and basic hands-on practice workshop prepared the volunteers for handling, numbering, cataloguing, recording and storing objects from Effingham County's history. Funding was provided by Illinois Humanities and the National Endowment for the Humanities.

Museum volunteers and their leader attracted regional and state-wise recognition. Delaine Donaldson, ECCCMA President, was given a Lifetime Achievement Award by the Illinois State Historical Society at their 2012 Annual Awards Program in East Peoria, Illinois on April 27,2012. The basis for the award was Mr. Donaldson's long tenure as a teacher and lecturer, as well as his efforts to salvage the old courthouse. In his words, "We saved it from becoming a parking lot. We are hoping to have it open by November."

That prediction came true. The first of a long series of historic lectures was hosted by the Effingham County Museum on November 8, 2012. Tom McDevitt, of Charleston, Illinois, was the speaker. He shared his memories from the time his father was the Effingham County Sheriff, and the family lived over the County Jail, on the second floor. Because the County Sheriff had an office in the courthouse, he had stories about the building and its staff as well.

=== 2013-2014 changes ===
A grand opening ceremony with a ribbon cutting was held in January 2013. At that point, the organization had 200 volunteers. Visitors toured one of the first galleries, which honored local veterans. Uniforms, bomb caps, V-letters, insignia, and photographs of World War II Effingham County soldiers were part of those exhibits. In a second gallery, a large HO railroad model delighted the children, while adults perused the train artifacts and photographs displayed on the walls.

A log from the Old National Road was on display in the central hallway of Level 1, as Dennis Langley had recommended. The National Road originated with President Thomas Jefferson, who saw the need to open up the west. Congress authorized and funded it, starting in 1808. It originated in Cumberland, Maryland and reached Illinois in the 1830s. Towns grew up along the route. In Effingham County, that included Montrose, Teutopolis, Effingham, and Altamont. This particular log was discovered in 2007 by a local road crew who were replacing a culvert. It was one of several buried in gravel and soil. They were preserved for over 160 years because the environment retarded decay. Mr. Joe Schmohe, who lived nearby, recognized them for what they were and convinced the road crew not to burn them. Later, he arranged for one of them to transported to the Effingham County Museum. A local lumberyard, Effingham Builder Supply, helped with the transfer, and Bierman Welding made a metal carrier with sturdy rollers that permits the heavy log to be moved.

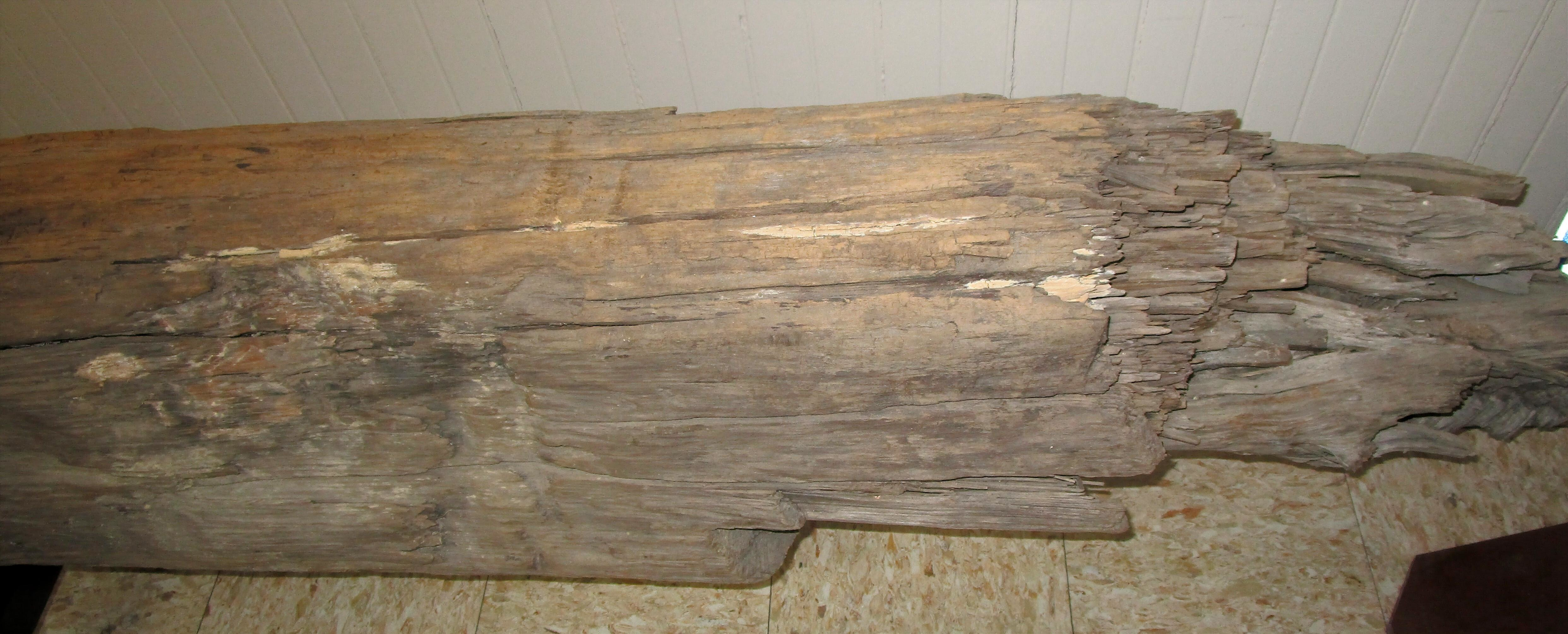
National Road Log, Central Hallway Level 1

Within a short time, local historians began writing about local history for an area newspaper. Here again, military history was a focus, and every articles was accompanied by one or more historic photographs. This long running series became known as the MUSEUM PAGE, a practice that began with an article that appeared in a late 2014 issue.

Year 2013 also brought the publication of several books written by Effingham County historians. A Museum member and town of Mason historian produced Grandpa Gibson's Letters and Early Historical Notes of Mason Illinois. The author shared Hugh Gibson's memories of life in Mason in the early 1900s, as well as the story of James Newton Matthews. Dr. Matthews was a medical doctor who was known regionally as the Poet of the Prairie. He was a close friend of James Whitcomb Riley, the Hoosier Poet. Both poets' works were widely shared in the national press in the late 1800s.

Two retired teachers with a long-time interest in local history co-wrote Maggie's Boys. The book presented object lessons from Effingham County history by depicting how the County's ancestors dealt with hardship. It was loosely based on a local family who raised nine children during the Great Depression. Interspersed with their lives were stories of Effingham County personalities who had a lasting effect on the community, including geologist and oilman Homer Luttrell, and attorney Harold Taylor, who served as an Effingham County Judge 1926-1934 and in the Illinois House of Representatives 1935-1937. The Taylor Law Offices are across the street from the Effingham County Museum.

The Museum's Nurse Historian published Mother Mary Ann Brown Newcomb: Effingham's Civil War Nurse. Mother Newcomb served with Grant's Army as a volunteer on the Western front during much of the Civil War. After her husband died of a bullet wound incurred at Fort Donelson, she complied with his deathbed wish to "go back and take care of the boys." Newcomb served at Shiloh, Corinth, Occupied Arkansas, Vicksburg and New Orleans. She was not a trained nurse, but applied prior medical knowledge gained from caring for cholera victims and family members. Her primary interest was the survival and welfare of the man in ranks.

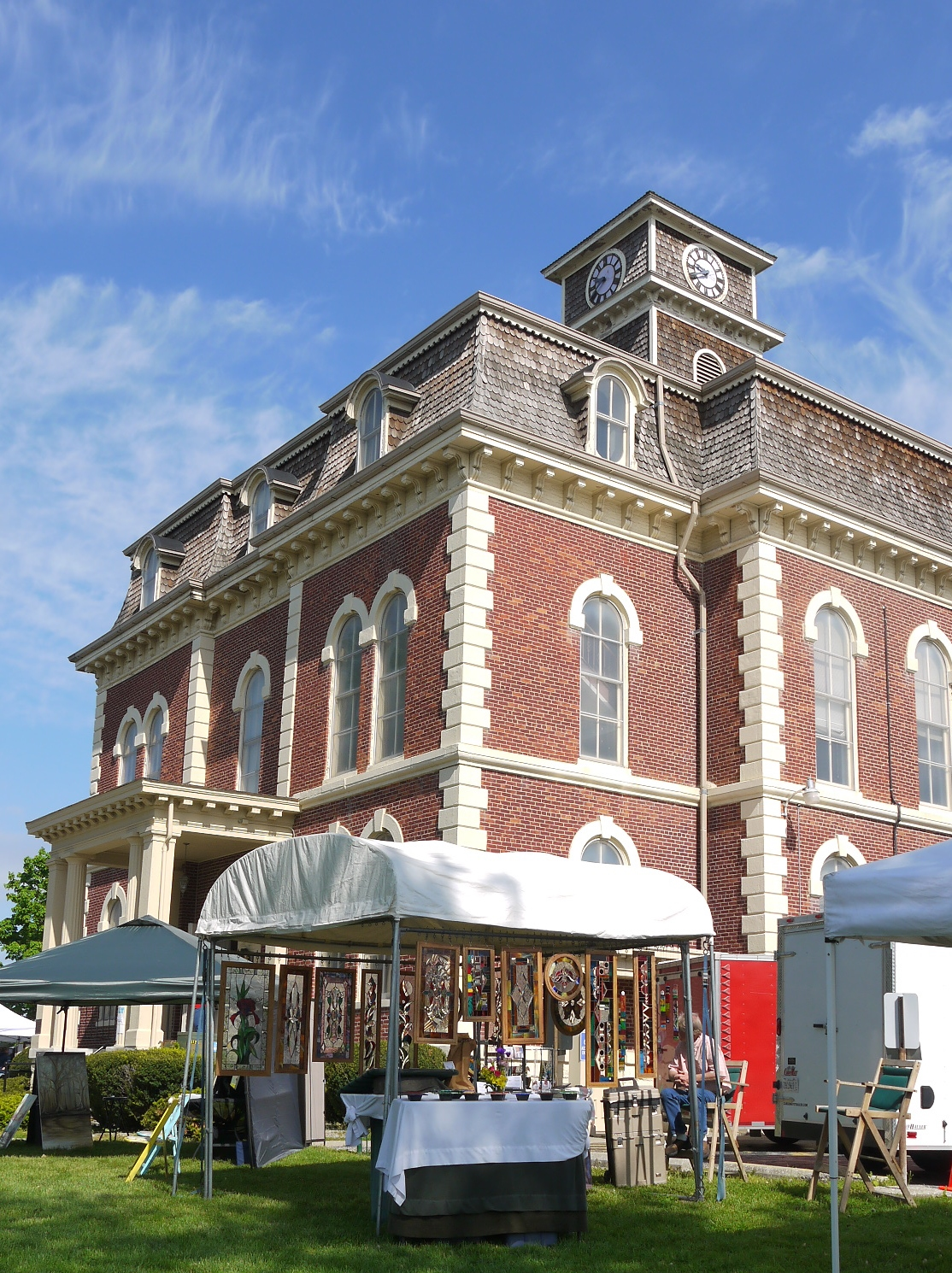
Artisan Fair, Museum Grounds May 2014

Several special events occurred around and in the Effingham County Museum during the year. An Artisans' Fair was held on the grounds in the month of May. Over 30 vendors came and attracted hundreds of visitors. Guests shopped, sampled wine and spent time together in the community on a warm and sunny spring day. Many came inside the Museum and explored the new exhibits for the first time.

The Museum played a part in Effingham's Old Fashioned Christmas celebration in late November 2014. Hundreds of people came to see Santa Claus as he rode up next to the Museum on the historic fire truck that had fought the St. Anthony Hospital Fire in April of 1949. Many also came inside to the see the Museum decorated for the Christmas season.

=== Second level renovation 2013-2015 ===
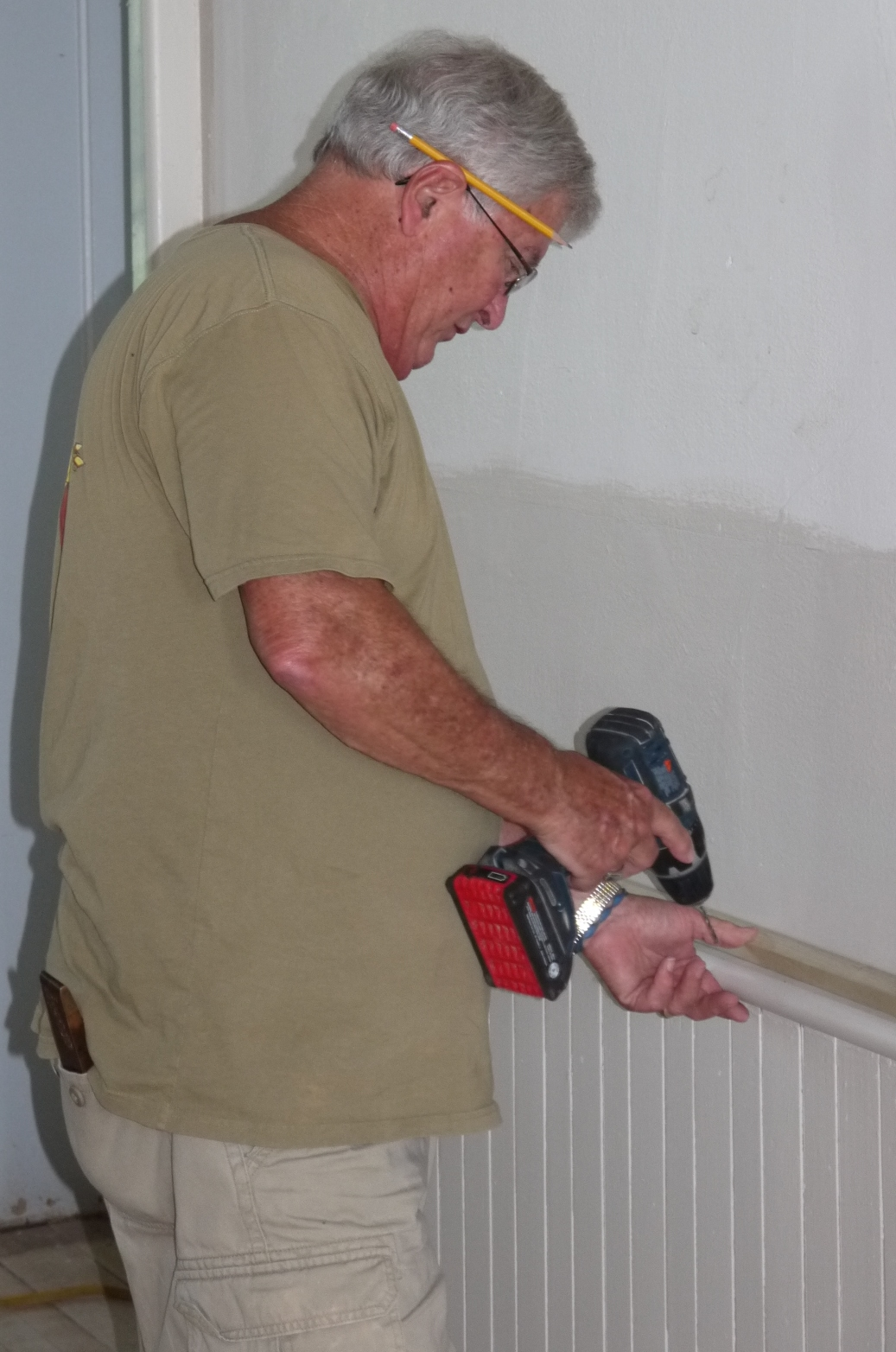
Volunteer renovating side wall summer 2014

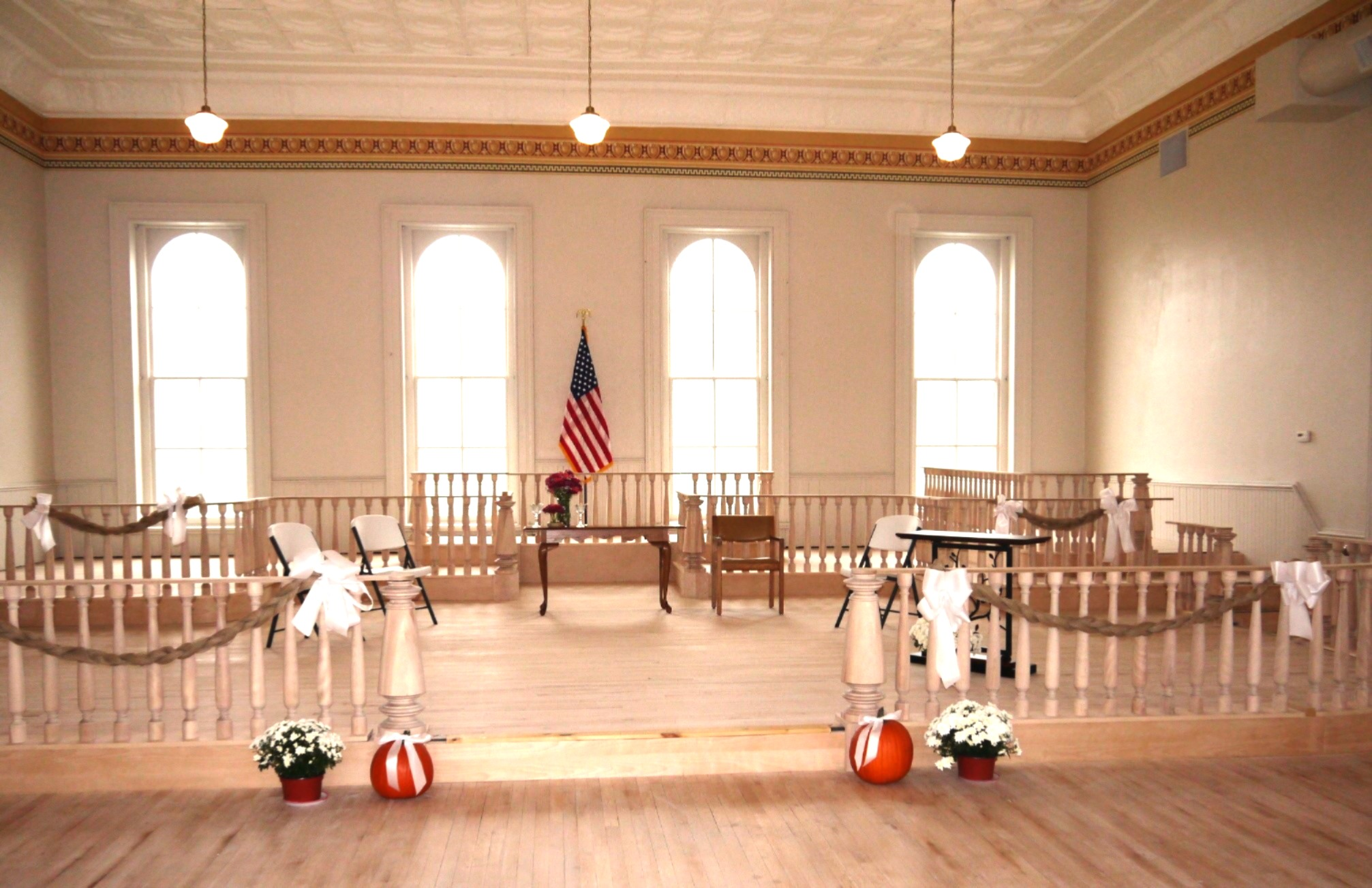
Restored space west end of courtroom October 2015

Work to renovate the second level courtroom began in early 2013. The 40 foot by 60 foot area had been modified in the late 1960s-early 1970s to meet the expanding needs of the county. The high tin ceiling had been covered and lowered. Glued down carpet covered the hardwood floor. The plastered walls were concealed behind dark paneling. On the west end, the elevated area with the judge's podium, lawyer tables, and jury box were also modified. The spindles and rails were removed, and the curved edges of the area separating it from the public seating were straightened. Several corners of the courtroom were walled off, in one case to add a restroom. The volunteers worked to return the room to something closer to its original state. The paneling was removed and the walls painted. The carpet was pulled up and the glue scraped away. The suspended ceiling was removed and the hidden tin revealed. False walls were pulled down.

When marks on floor made the original outline of the elevated area visible, a plan took shape to recreate the curved rails and spindles. A Teutopolis cabinet shop used laser technology to mimic the design and then created and donated the replacements. It was a lengthy process, but a little over a year later, all the rails and spindles were in place and ready to be painted. The hardwood floor was also ready to be sealed.

=== 2015: A year of expansion ===
Year 2015 witnessed a number of first for the Effingham County Museum. The first Lincoln Celebration was held on April 15, the day before the anniversary of his assassination. It was a collaborative event in conjunction with Lake Lake College. Museum President Delaine Donaldson spoke on Civil War letters, and newspaperman Herb Meeker talked about the role of the press during the same era. Matt Grieder, a Lake Land history professor, described the public's reaction to Lincoln's death. Jamie Miller spoke of her relative, Kate Clutter, who was nanny to Lincoln's children in Washington. Patrick Johnson, of Johnson Funeral Home, addressed mid-19th century embalming practices. Finally, Lake Land faculty Nancy Caldwell and Matt Greider, in conjunction with local historian Dan Wormhoudt, described the Lincoln funeral.

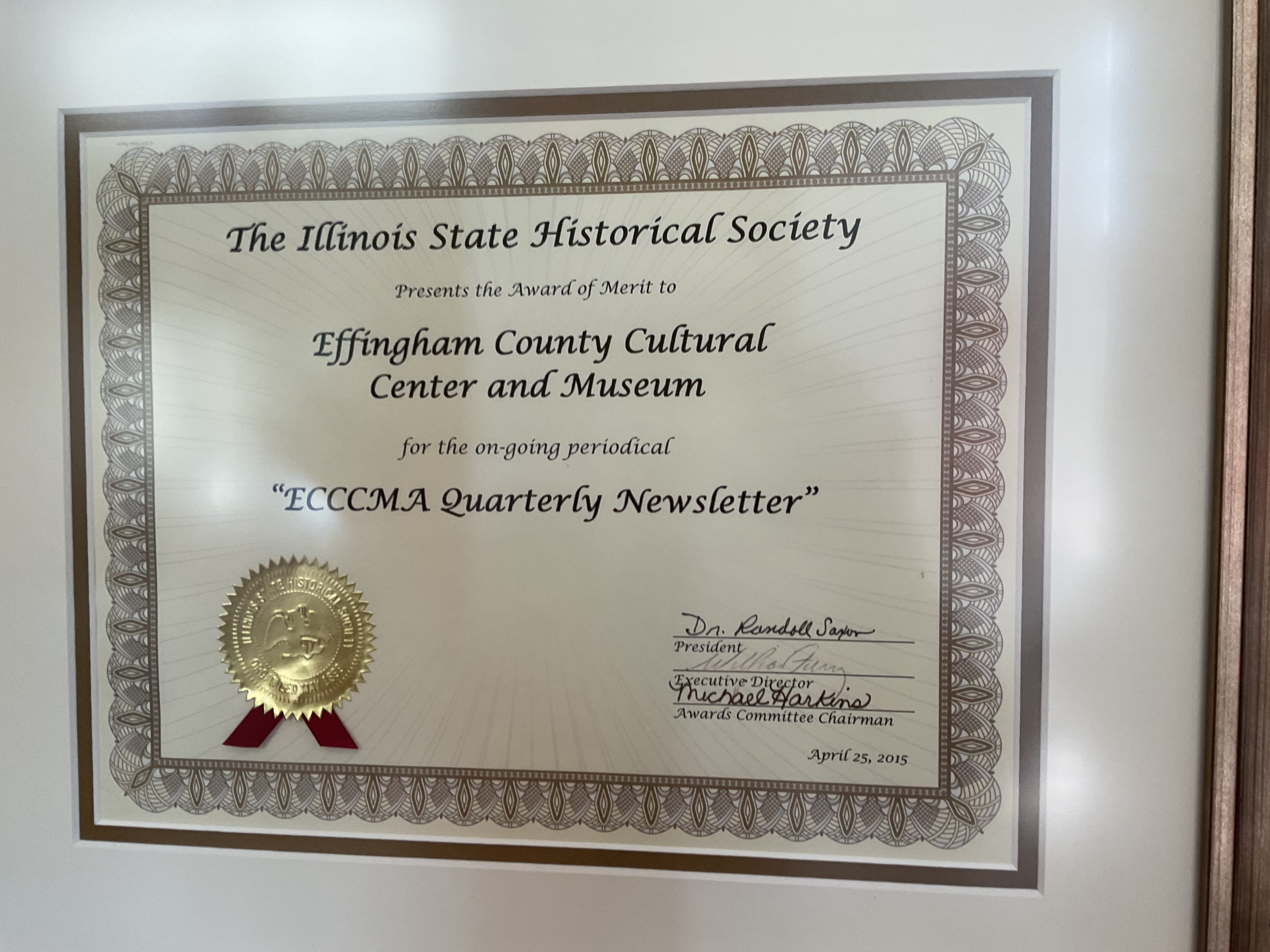
ISHS Award of Merit, ECM Lobby

The following month, the Museum received its first award from the Illinois State Historical Society. In describing the Museum quarterly newsletter, the ISHS Awards Committee stated, "A fresh, clear newsletter distinguished by its readability and thoroughness. Includes many useful items such as a calendar, photos, mission statement, and contact information. This publication demonstrates this organization is active, vibrant, and engaged with the community. This is an excellent example of what can be achieved without an expensive budget and with a reasonable amount of non-expert expertise."

An effort to paint a mural depicting elements of Effingham County history inside the dome in the ceiling of the second level courtroom commenced in June with an offer made by a local surgeon with artistic talent. Dr. Ruben Boyajian stressed his belief that small towns like Effingham need to preserve their history in order to maintain their identity. The dome is even higher than the courtroom ceiling, which means Dr. Boyajian must use a motorized lift to reach it. In the 1870s era, the dome enhanced the acoustics of the room, making it easier for people to hear the court proceedings. But because of the dome's curvature, part of the painting must be completed with the artist in a leaned-back position.

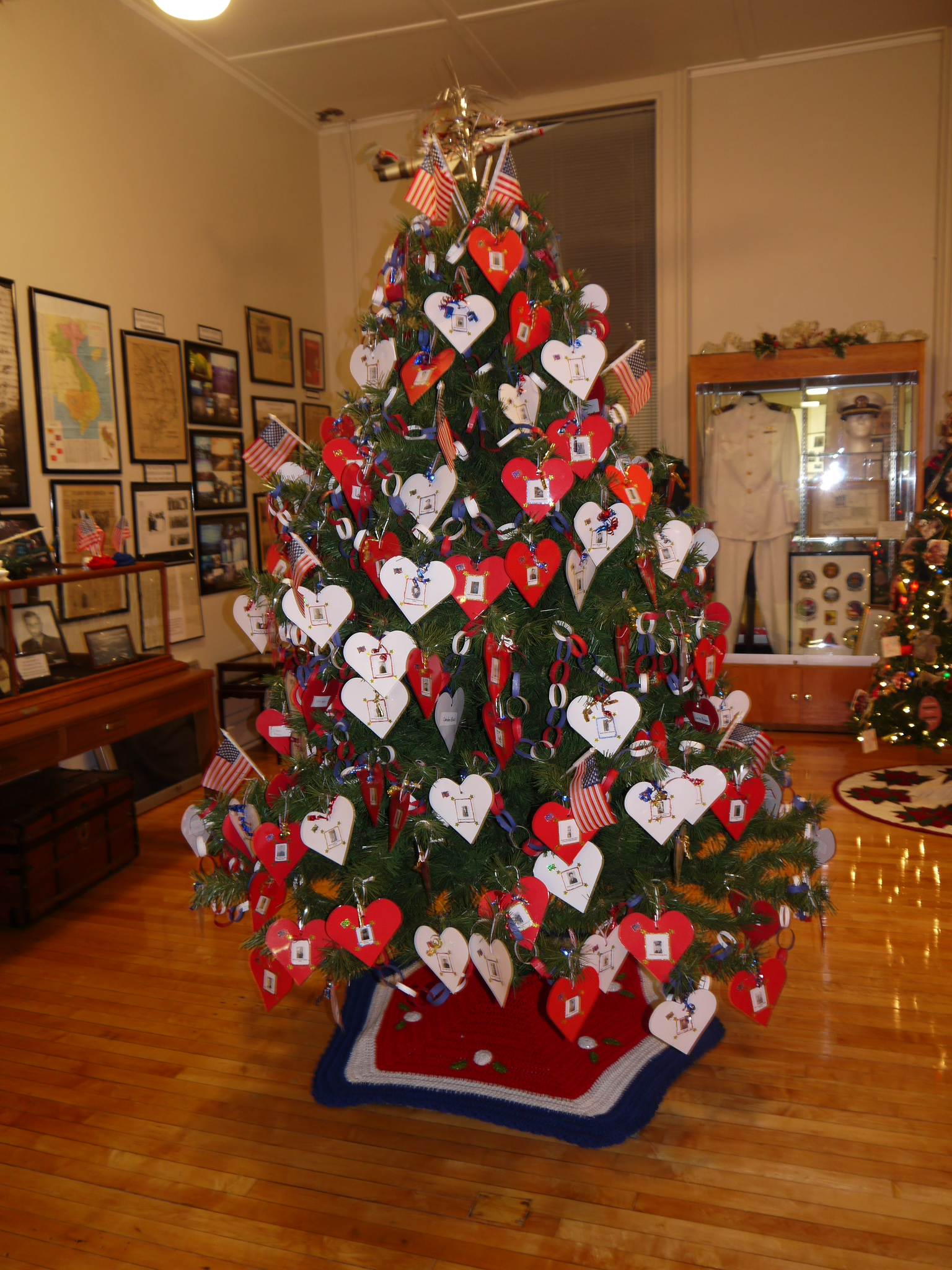
Veterans Tree at Christmas Open House

In December, a Museum volunteer and retired school teacher started a tradition associated with the Museum's Christmas Open House. It became known as the Veterans' Tree, as Jane Loy Ries planned and implemented the decor for a special tree in Gallery 3. She said, "I was a baby boomer who grew up listening to the stories of World War 2 veterans." As they succumbed to the aging process, she believed their history should be preserved. Reis retired after 40 years in the Effingham school system, which allowed her to keep contact with current educators. Students in the primary grades each adopted a veteran, whose image was mounted on a colored heart and laminated. Altogether, there are 190 ornaments. Thirty-two of the veterans on the tree were killed in action. Children visiting the Museum during their holiday break searched for the veteran they adopted as part of a history lesson plan. Other visitors looked for ancestors on the tree.

=== Expanded Reach in 2016 ===
April brought several special events. The Lincoln Celebration also celebrated women's fashions in the 1860s. Volunteer models demonstrated how there were certain rules to be followed if a woman wanted to regarded as respectable. There were multiple layers, from corset to bonnet. Women risked heat exhaustion every summer to avoid tan lines and sunburn.

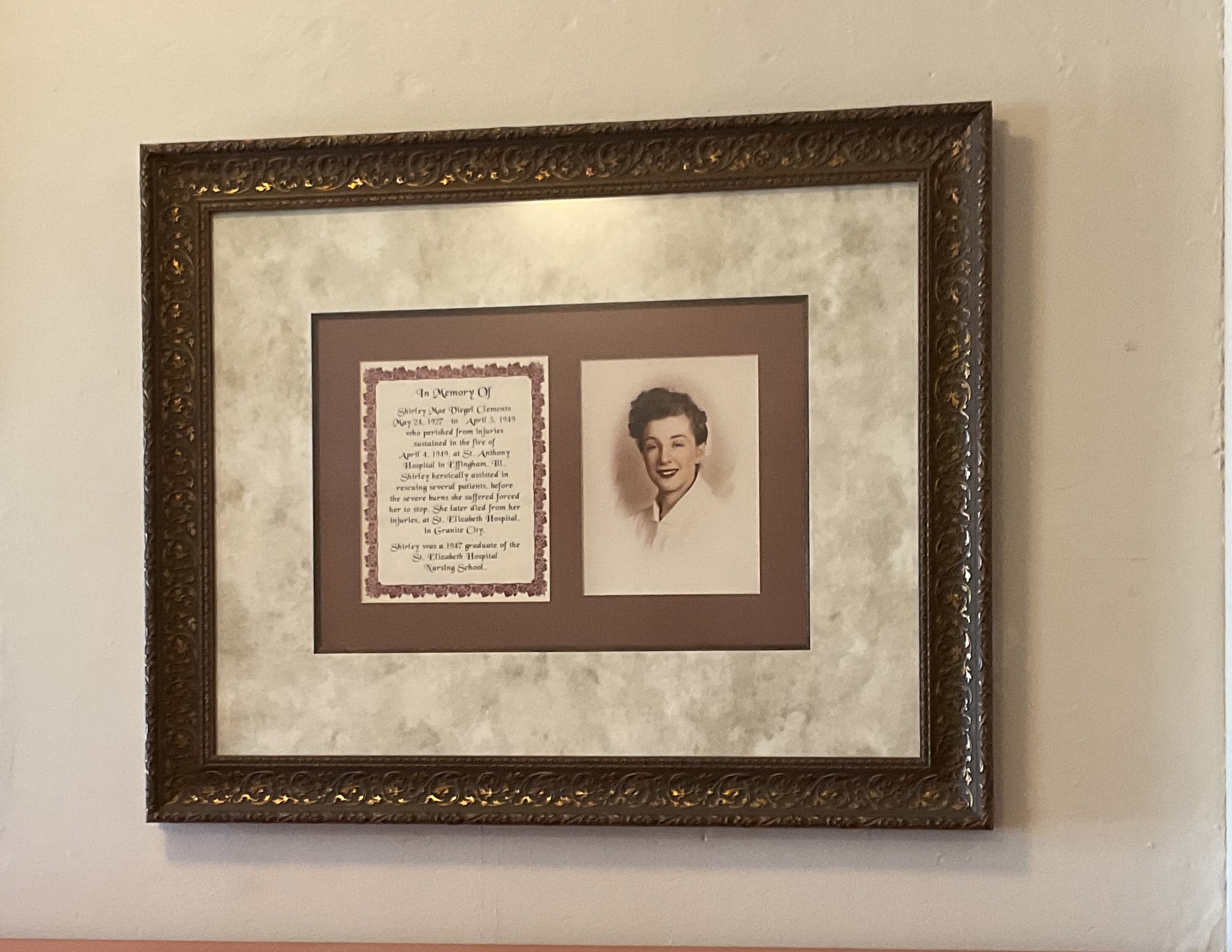
Shirley Veigel Clements Portrait Gallery 4

That same month, the Museum welcomed a family group from western Illinois and eastern Missouri to view an exhibit. At its center was Shirley Veigel Clements, a registered nurse who died in Effingham's 1949 St. Anthony Hospital fire. Her strong sense of duty sent her back inside the flaming structure multiple times to rescue patients, and she died the next day of massive 2nd and 3rd degree burns. Her daughter, who was nine months old when Shirley died, donated her mother's things to the Museum. Shirley daughter, Shirley's sister, as well as her grandchildren came as a group to see them on exhibit in Galley 4.

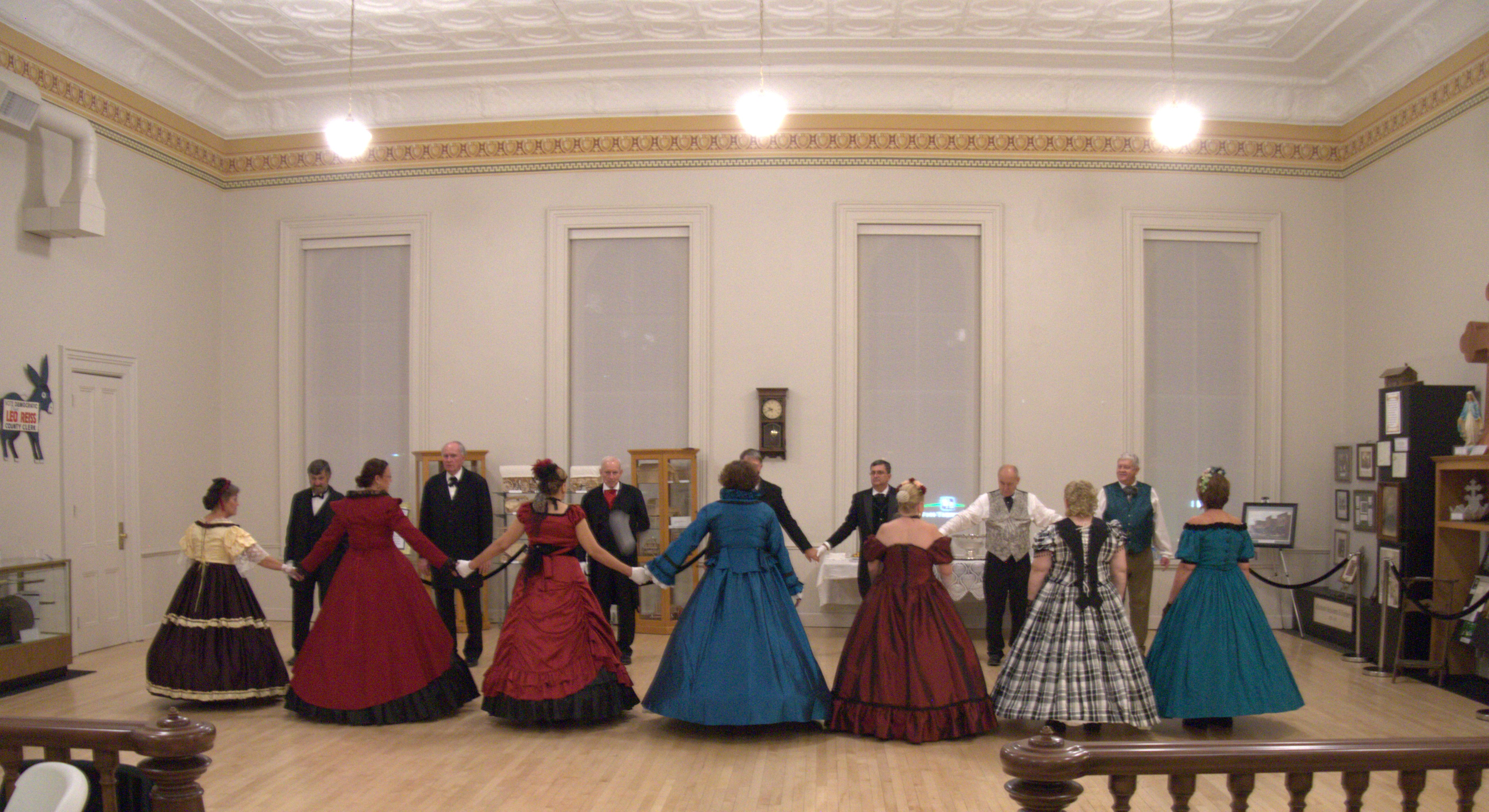
Dancers at the 1872 Grand Ball

In October, the second level Event Center officially opened, and the volunteers celebrated with an 1872 Grand Ball. Two impersonators represented President U. S. Grant and First Lady Julia Grant. After President Grant gave a speech, Toliver's Salt Creek String Band played. Costumed dancers were introduced to period entertainment by a dance mistress. Both dancers and spectators enjoyed lemonade and other period refreshments prepared and served by Museum volunteers.

Later that month, another family with local roots came back to Effingham to see evidence of those roots at the Museum. An 87-year-old woman from California came, as did a cousin from Chicago who was originally from New Jersey. Their common African-American ancestor was a barber in Altamont, with roots going back to 1873. The level 2 display contained photos of several branches of the Ellis family, and confirmed their belief in the value of education. Family members moved to the east and west coast in the advent of the Great Depression.

=== Collaboration in 2017 ===
Four historians from the Museum journeyed together to the Trutter Center on the Lincoln Land College campus at Springfield in April to accept the ECCCMA's second Illinois State Historical Society Award, which was for the ongoing Museum Page in the Effingham Daily News. The awards committee wrote, in part, "The authors' straightforward writing style, thorough research, and good use of photographs provide their readers with solid information and a unique understanding of their community."

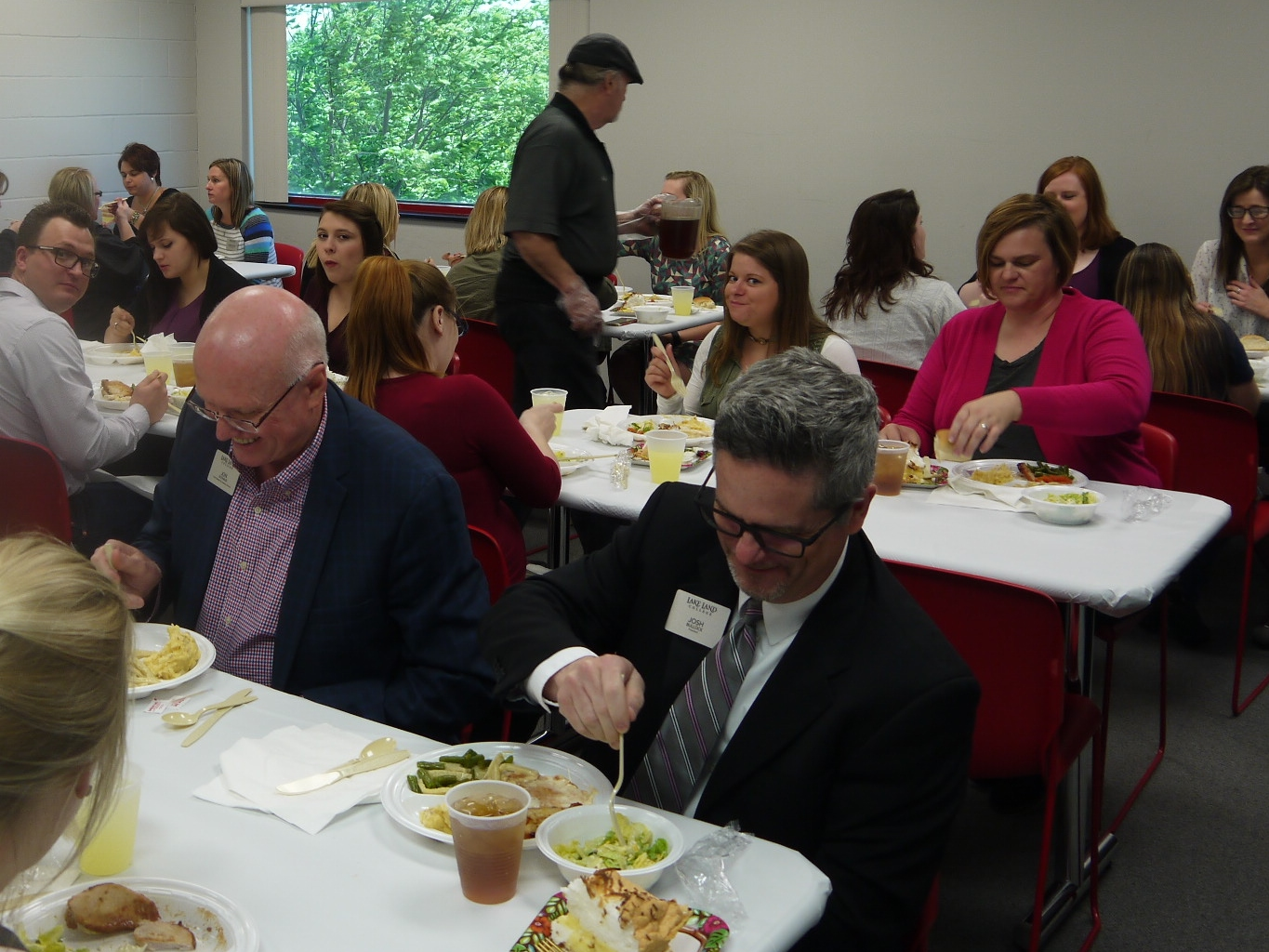
ADN Students celebrate 30 years of nursing education

Lake Land College (LLC) and the Museum formally marked the 30th anniversary of the LLC Associate Degree Nursing Program on May 5. Twenty-two spring graduates gathered at Effingham's Kluthe Center for Higher Education and Technology to celebrate their personal achievements as well as to note the long-term success of their program. The Lake Land College President and the Vice President for Academic Affairs joined the students for a catered meal topped off by Niemerg's Steak House coconut creme pie. A Museum exhibit in the Kluthe Center Lobby highlighted artifacts from the early era of nursing education at Lake Land College.

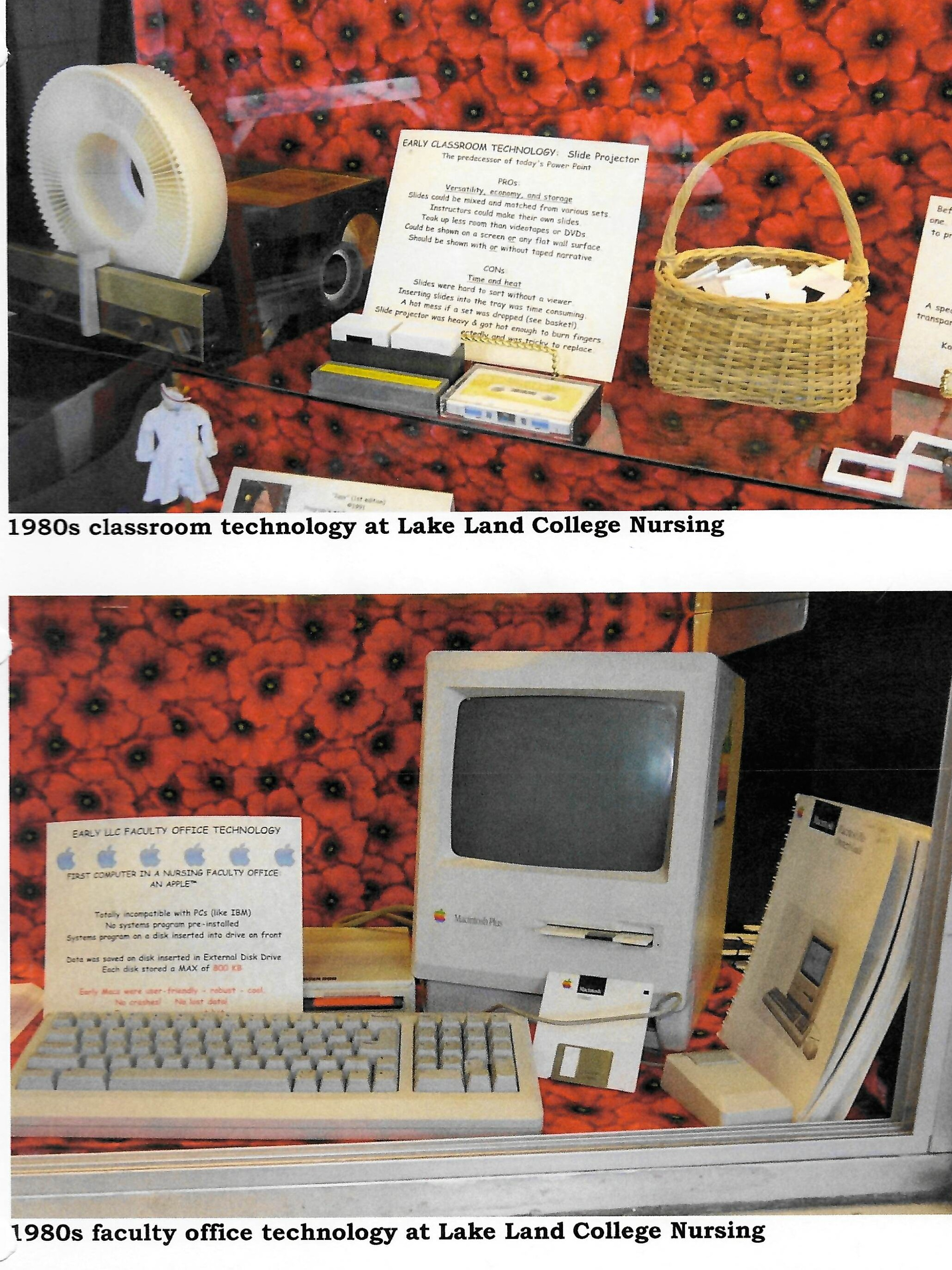
1980s nursing education teaching tools

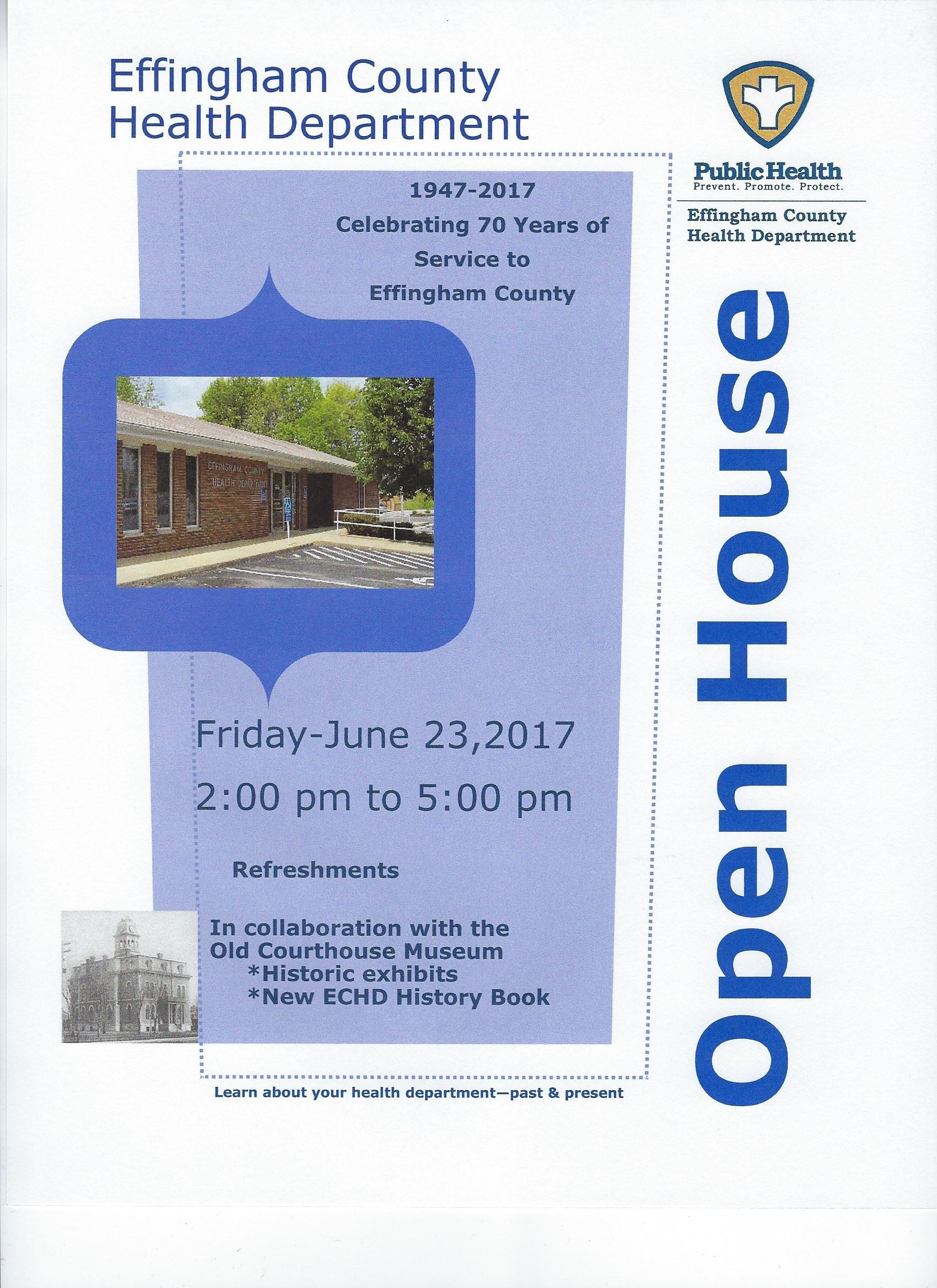
ECM-ECHD Open House Flyer June 2017

The Museum worked with the Effingham County Health Department (ECHD) to celebrate their seventy (70) years of service to the community. The health department was established by referendum in 1947. Dr. Fred Tonney was the Medical Director. He emphasized immunizations and school physicals, and was particularly concerned with maternal-child health. When the St. Anthony Hospital fire deprived Effingham County women of in-patient care, the ECHD filled the gap. Nurse Supervisor Marjorie Scaife contacted the hospital Chief of Staff and offered to help. ECHD nurses assisted with three deliveries in the home during the first 48 hours after the fire. The home delivery service continued for almost four years, until the new hospital opened, with no maternal deaths. Museum volunteers celebrated this and other ECHD achievements with an Open House of June 23, 2017.

The Museum volunteers joined with Matt Devall, a local cinematographer, to film stories from Effingham County history that could be shown on monitors at various location within the galleries. The filming was done in early 2017 and was ready to showcase in June. Mr. Devall indicated that the hardest part of the project was limiting each video's length to what we could reasonably expect a visitor to spend standing in front of a monitor. Stories included World War 2, Vietnam and current era veteran experiences, Civil War nursing, the 1949 hospital fire, railroad history, and the first woman to graduate from a law school in the state of Illinois. There are eight videos, with one each in the Lobby, Gallery 1, Gallery 2, Gallery 3, the central hallway, Gallery 4, Gallery 5, and just inside the entrance of the second level courtroom.

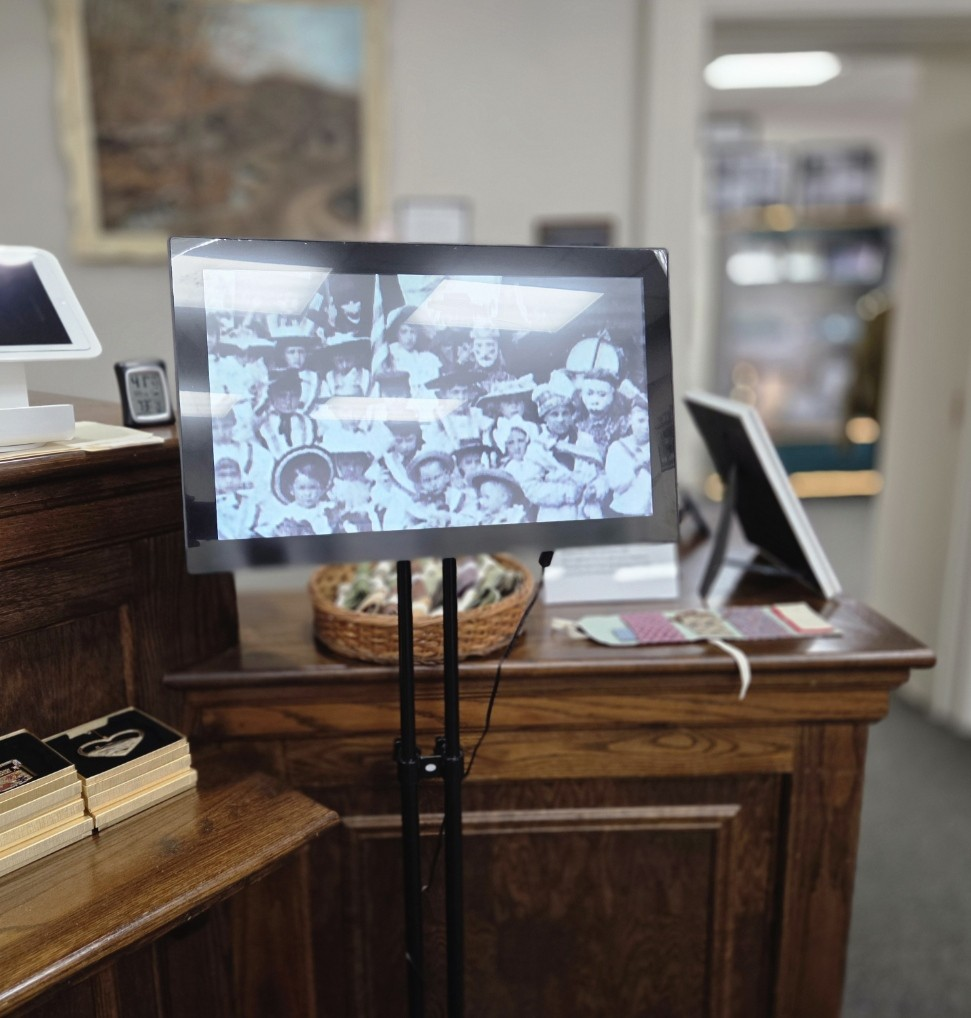
Video monitor Gallery 3

September brought the Old Settlers' Reunion, a tradition that went back 140 years, more or less, with some breaks in between. Various groups gathered on the Museum lawn to celebrate memories of the County's history. An Old Settler was defined as a person who had lived in the county for 30 years or more. Everyone who registered was issued a red Old Settlers ribbon. The DAR was there, as were the Old Mill Road Threshermen, some Cub Scouts, the Effingham American Legion, and the ladies from St. John's Lutheran Church (of Louisville). Dan Koester and his mule team gave wagon rides to kids who had never seen a mule up close. The Kingery Brothers and the Smokehouse Band played from the gazebo. The Effingham Convention and Visitors Bureau offered free souvenir photos with the canon. Awards were given to the oldest Old Settlers (Loreen Macklin, 101, and John Kirby, 93). Gertrude and Charles Harris were the longest married couple (71 years). Sixty-four people entered the Historic Bedpan Content; twenty-two contestants answered all the questions correctly, which put them in the running for prize. Dan Dasenbrock won, and he shared that his aunt, Ruth Stodden, had won the nail driving contest 50 years earlier.

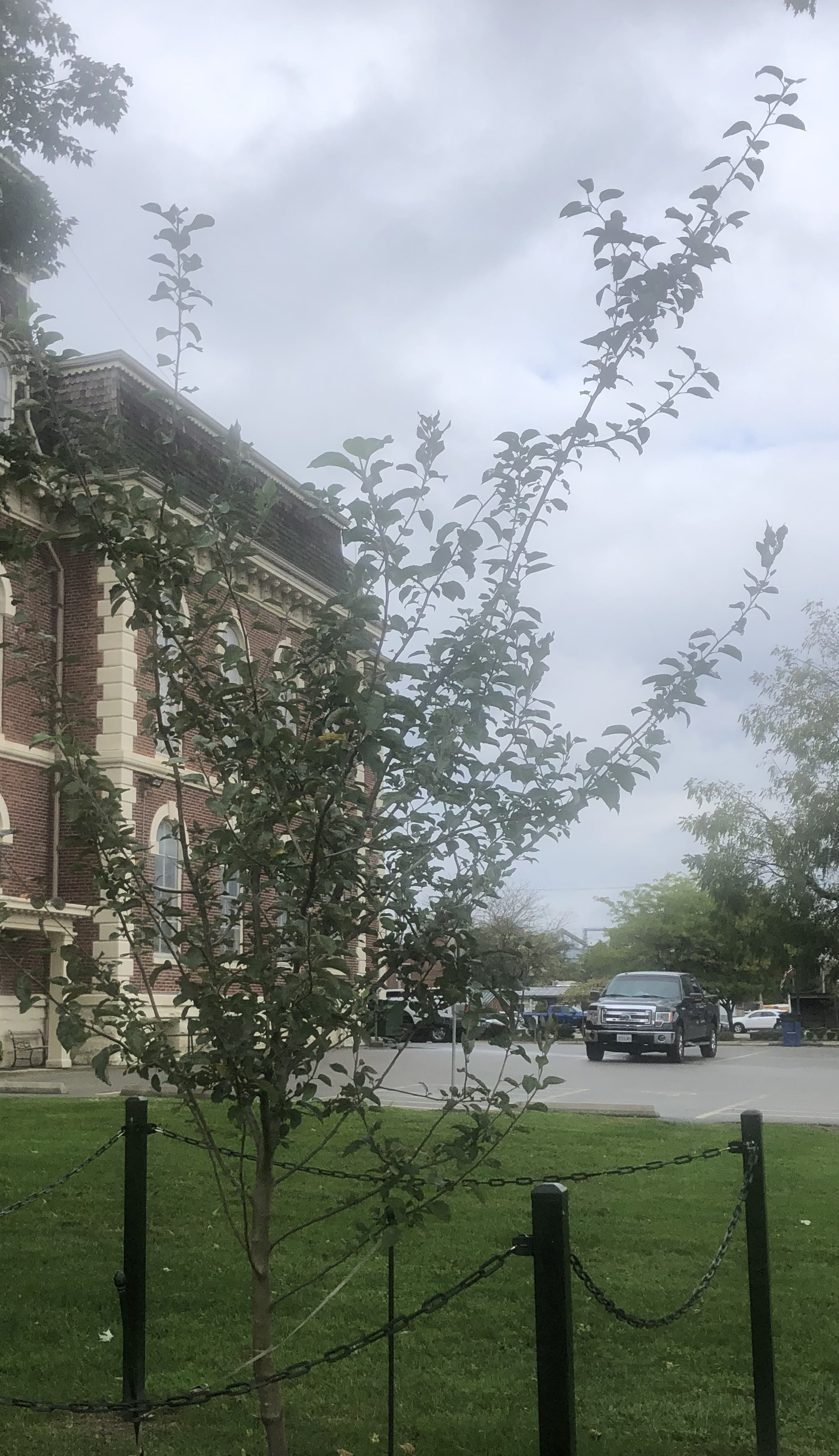
Johnny Appleseed Tree

A special tree was planted on the grounds around the Museum in October. In anticipation of Illinois' 200th anniversary in 2018, the Illinois State Historical Society offered all 102 Illinois counties a descendent of a Johnny Appleseed tree. John Chapmen, also known as Johnny Appleseed, planted apple seeds all over Illinois, Pennsylvania, Indiana, West Virginia, and Ohio. An orchard with apple trees was of great value to families in the early 19th century. Apples were food on the table and could be made into cider or applejack. Not everyone had access to uncontaminated water, and apple juice was a safe alternative, particularly for children. The last known tree was in Ohio, and that state's historical society obtained a graft from it, and then collaborated with a Missouri nursery to produce saplings. A retired Effingham attorney approached the county board to get permission to plant the tree and drove to Springfield to get it. The county board picked the spot, and a local nursery did the planting.

=== On to Year 2018 ===
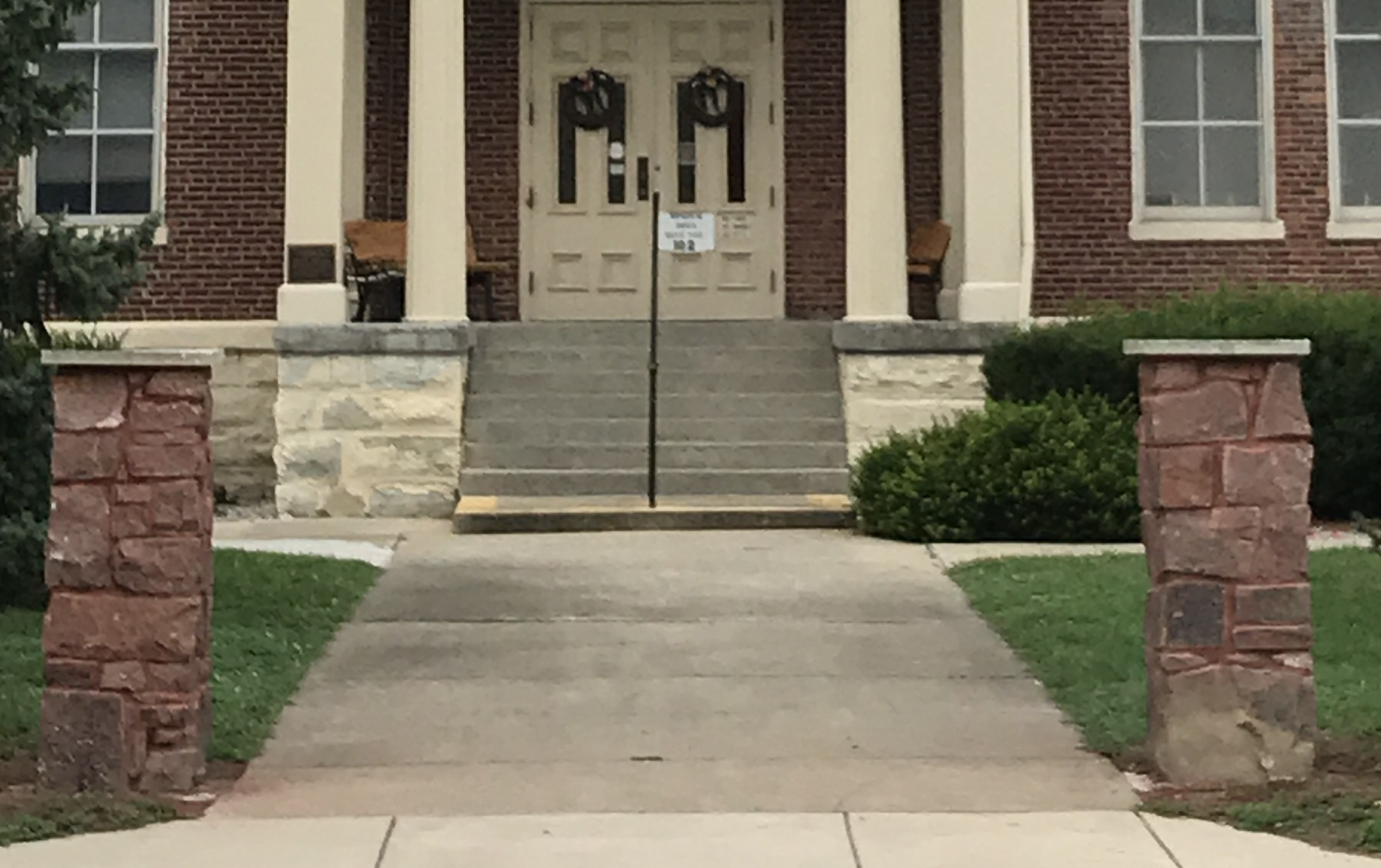
Relocated red granite pillars

Some 1920s Effingham history was preserved in the aftermath as the city resurfaced the pavement on the corner of Fifth Street and Wabash. Two 6.5 ft. tall by 2.5 ft. wide red granite pillars were near the sidewalk and limited visibility at the intersection. This was near South Side School and the entrance to Kreke's Terrace Addition subdivision. Kreke Terrace was an early Effingham section dedicated to homes, and Dr. S. F. Henry's residence was nearby. Earlier, there had been other identical granite pillars along this street, but they had been torn down and discarded. The city and the county collaborated to reposition these last two pillars along the sidewalk in front of the main entrance to the Museum. After disassembly at Fifth and Wabash, they were recreated on East Jefferson by two brick masons. Passersby are quoted as saying they look like they have always been there.

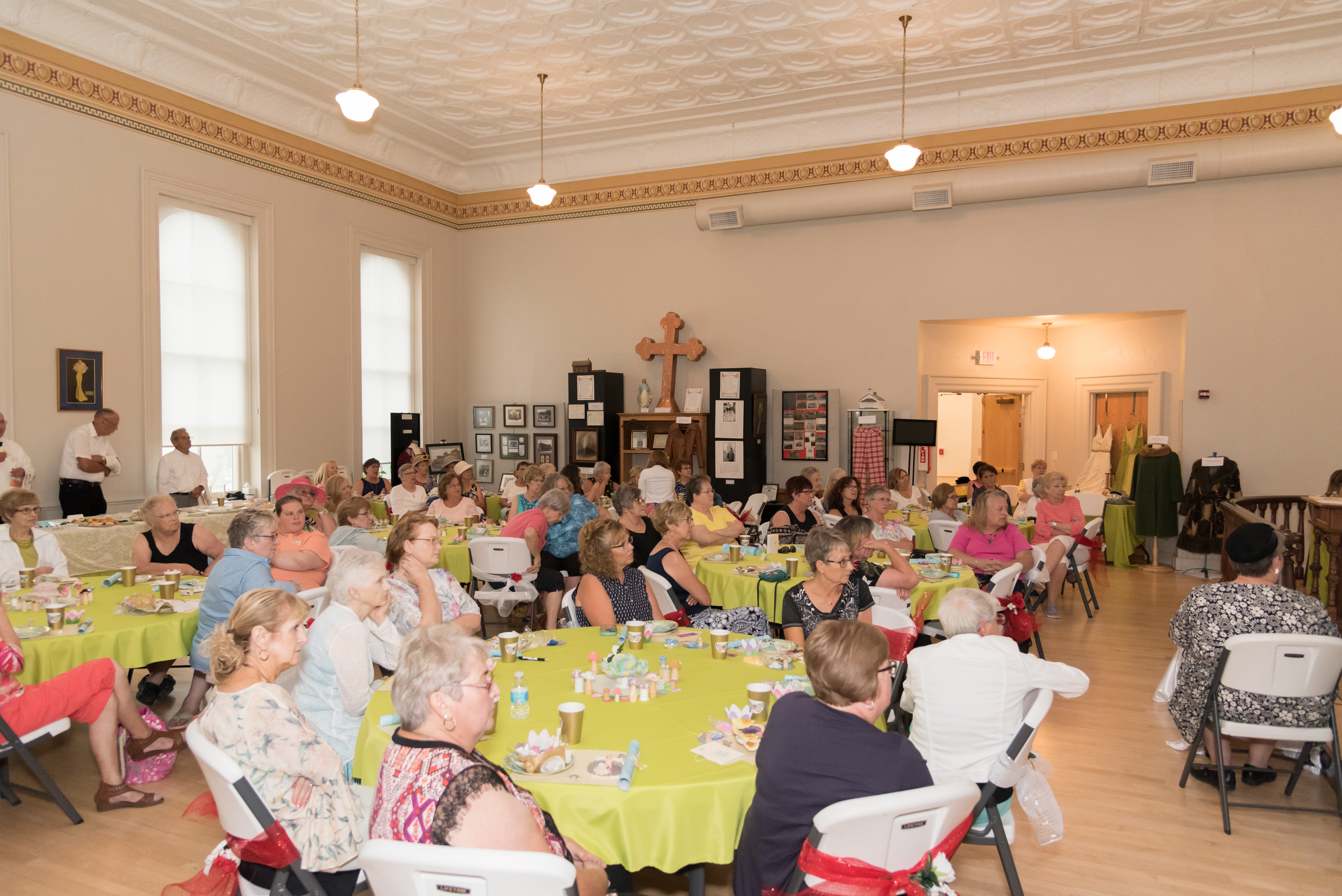
Ladies Tea Party, Level 2

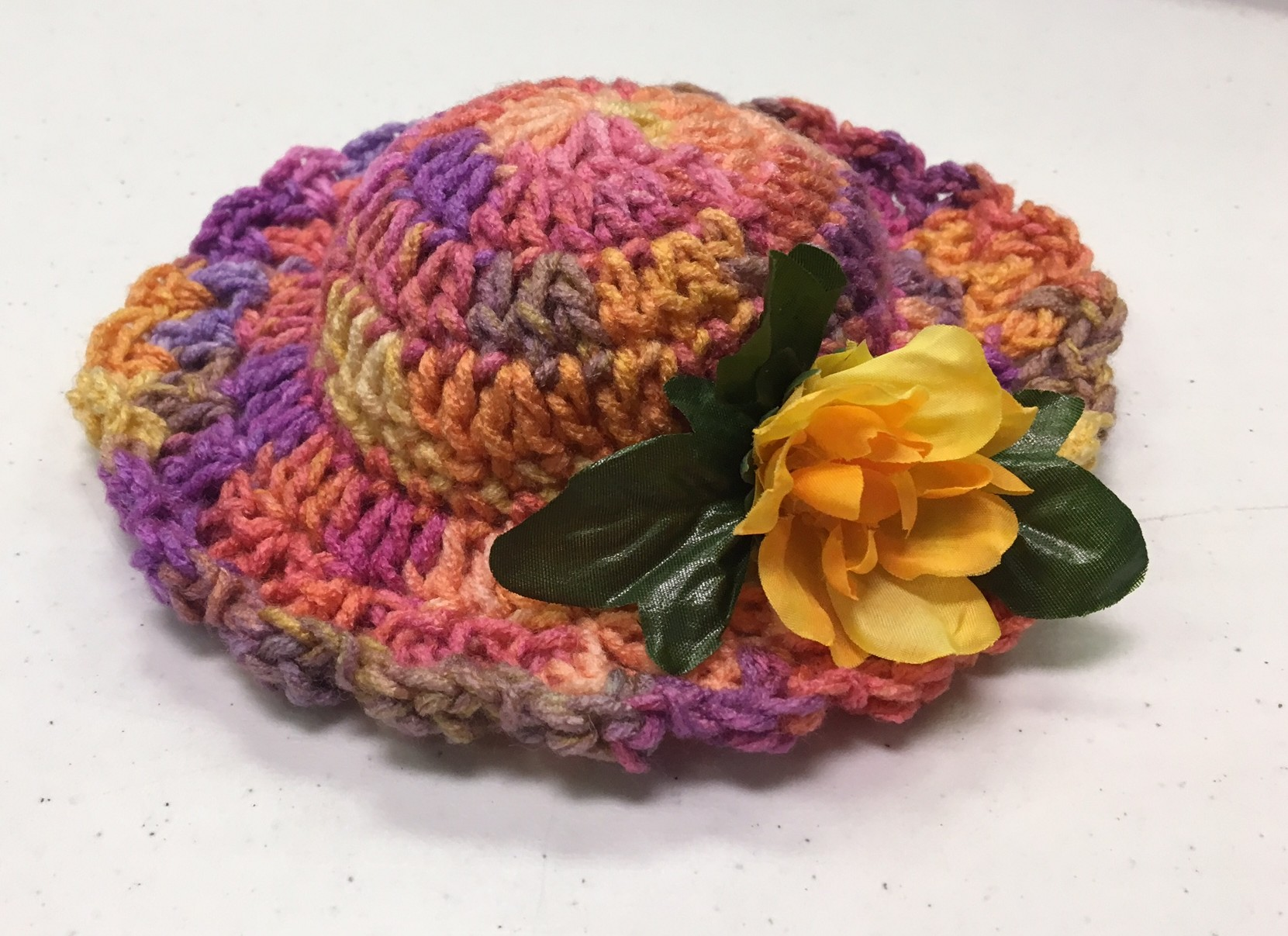
Crochet table decor

A capacity crowd attended the Ladies Tea Party in the second level Event Center in mid-July. Vintage clothing from the 1940s, 1950s, 1960s, and 1970s was modeled by fourteen teen and pre-teen volunteers. Some participants were recruited by a local history teacher. Museum volunteers set up the tables, created decor, prepared the edible delicacies and tea, and served as waiters and waitresses. The periphery of the room was covered with vintage clothing and accessory exhibits. The event closed with the Bridal Retrospective, a narrated Power Point history of the wedding dresses and veils chosen by local women from the war-time 1940s through the1970s.

The Museum celebrated the Bicentennial Doors Open Illinois event on August 11-12 with live reenactments of some local hidden history. Sandy Richardson played Matilda Flach, who had an early encounter with Abraham Lincoln when he was a state legislator. Her husband, Milton, was the Effingham Postmaster at the time, and they were guests at a dance at the Vandalia Hotel. Lincoln asked her to dance, and it was a challenge, as Lincoln had poor manners, was shabbily dressed and looked clumsy. Then he stepped on the skirt of her formal gown and ripped it. Phil Lewis depicted Teutopolis tailor, Joseph Horn, who had a different kind of "tearing" experience with Lincoln some years later. In the fall of 1848, Horn was a spectator at the Ewington courthouse. Ewington was the county seat at the time. Lincoln had come into town on horseback, and his coat had been ripped in transit. There was no tailor in Ewington, so Lincoln wore a loaner coat to court. Mr. Horn took Lincoln's coat home to Teutopolis, mended it and returned it. Matilda Susan Bourland Flach Bradley was born in Alabama in 1819 and died in Effingham on September 28, 1904. She is buried in Oakridge Cemetery. Joseph Horn was born in Germany in 1817, and died in Teutopolis on January 22, 1904. He is buried in St. Francis Cemetery in Teutopolis.

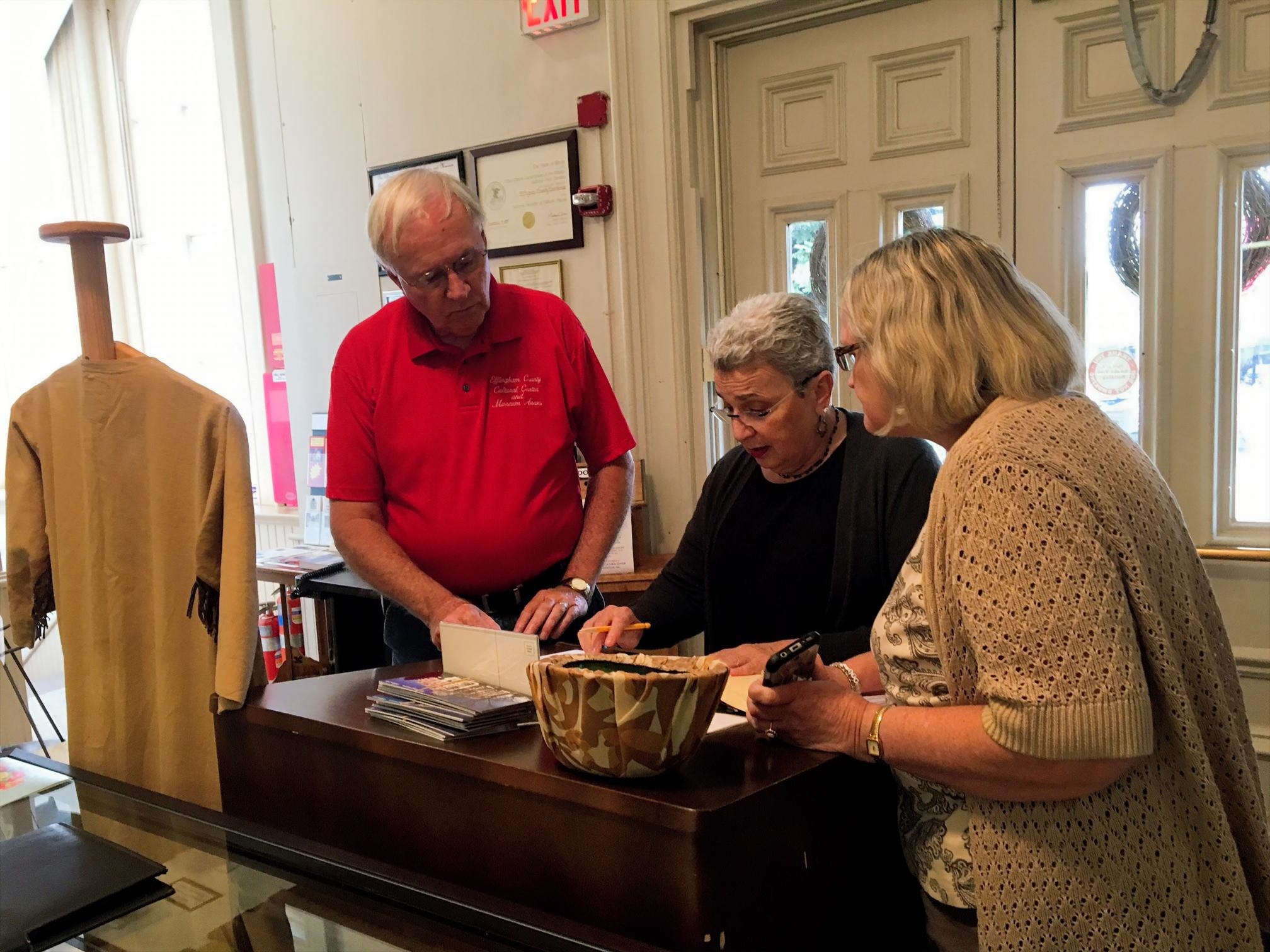
Conferring with Collections Conservator, Aug 15, 2018

Two conservators came to the Museum August 15 -16, 2018, during a Conservation Assessment for Preservation (CAP) visit. The CAP Program is administered by the Foundation for the American Institute for the Conservation of Historic and Artistic Works, an agency in Washington, D.C. Application for this award is competitive, and 80 awards were made in 2018. Four were in Illinois, and Effingham was the only site chosen down state. The Collections Conservator was Shelley Paine, from Nashville, Tennessee. She examined the Museum's exhibits, collections, and artifact storage. The architect, who assessed the interior and the exterior of the building, was Anne McGuire, from Evanston, Illinois. The conservators each produced a comprehensive report with detailed suggestions for short-term and long-term improvements. The CAP reports continue to direct the volunteers as they work to enhance the collections and the physical structure of the Museum.

Later in August, the Museum partnered with the Effingham Public Library and the Effingham Tourism Bureau to welcome historian and author Stan Banish. He wrote Roadside History of Illinois, a tourism guide organized around the state's roads and highways. Mr. Banish shared that Illinois can trace its origins as far back as two of the original 13 colonies, namely Connecticut and Virginia. He also noted the role of Nathaniel Pope, who presented Illinois' petition for statehood to the U. S. House of Representatives on January 16, 1818. Pope was also instrumental in establishing the northern border of Illinois, which originally stopped at the southernmost part of Lake Michigan.

The Museum hosted speaker Marion Blumenthal Lazan in October. As one of the dwindling number of holocaust survivors, Lazan stresses the need to hear about the lived experiences of people who were sent to concentration camps during World War 2. She was nine years old when she and her family were sent to Bergen-Belsen in 1944, the place where Anne Frank died. They were crammed together with 600 others in a barracks intended to hold 100 people. Their food was dry bread and a container of thin soup at first; later the bread was cut back to once a week. Frost bite was common, and many died of dysentery. Her mother worked in the kitchen, while Marion did pretend play most of the day. She collected a matched set of same-sized stones, which she believed was an omen that all four family members would get out alive. In April of 1945, the prisoners were shipped by train toward Eastern Europe, as the Nazis tried to evade the Allied forces. The Russians liberated the train. At that point, she was 10.5 years of age and weighed 35 pounds. Her father died of typhus soon after, but she and her mother and brother, were sent to Holland. The family came to the United States in 1948. She married, had a family, and lives in Peoria, Illinois. Lazan continues to speak out nationally and internationally.

=== 2019 - Ten Years and Counting ===
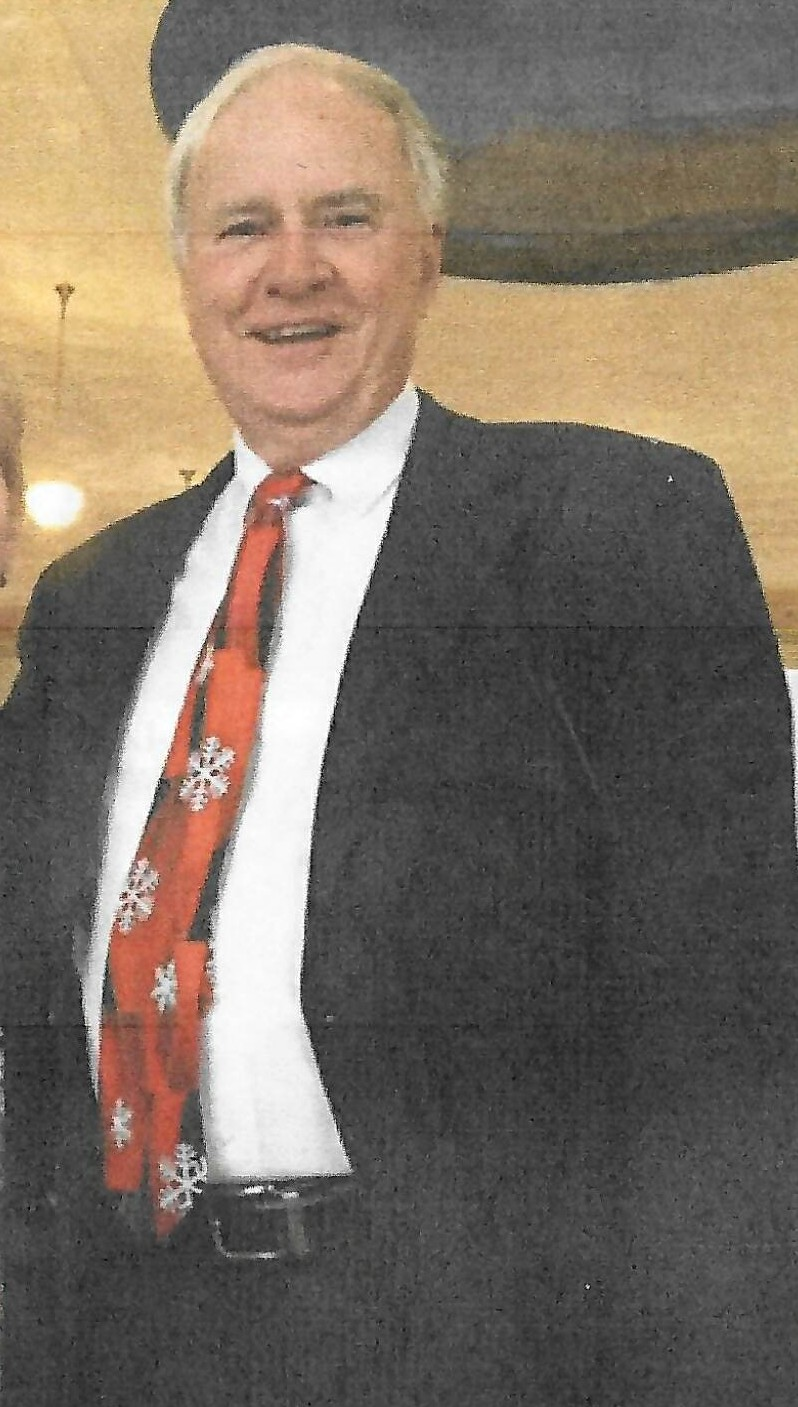
President Donaldson as Citizen of Year 2019

ECCCM President F. Delaine Donaldson was named Effingham Citizen of the Year in January. Attorney Dale Wolff wrote the nomination letter. Delaine's long tenure of teaching about, and advocating for, the preservation of county history was honored. He grew up in the eastern portion of the county, and taught history professionally at Effingham High School for 35 years. He was also associated with Effingham's Lake Land College Kluthe Center. Delaine and his wife, Sandi, visited historic sites on their vacation trips. Most importantly, F. Delaine Donaldson took the leadership role in saving the 1872 Second Empire style former County Courthouse from destruction when the county moved to the new Government Building just down the street on Jefferson Avenue. After that, and for the next ten years, he continued to shape the conversion of the former Effingham County Courthouse into the Effingham County Cultural Center and Museum (AKA, the Effingham County Museum).

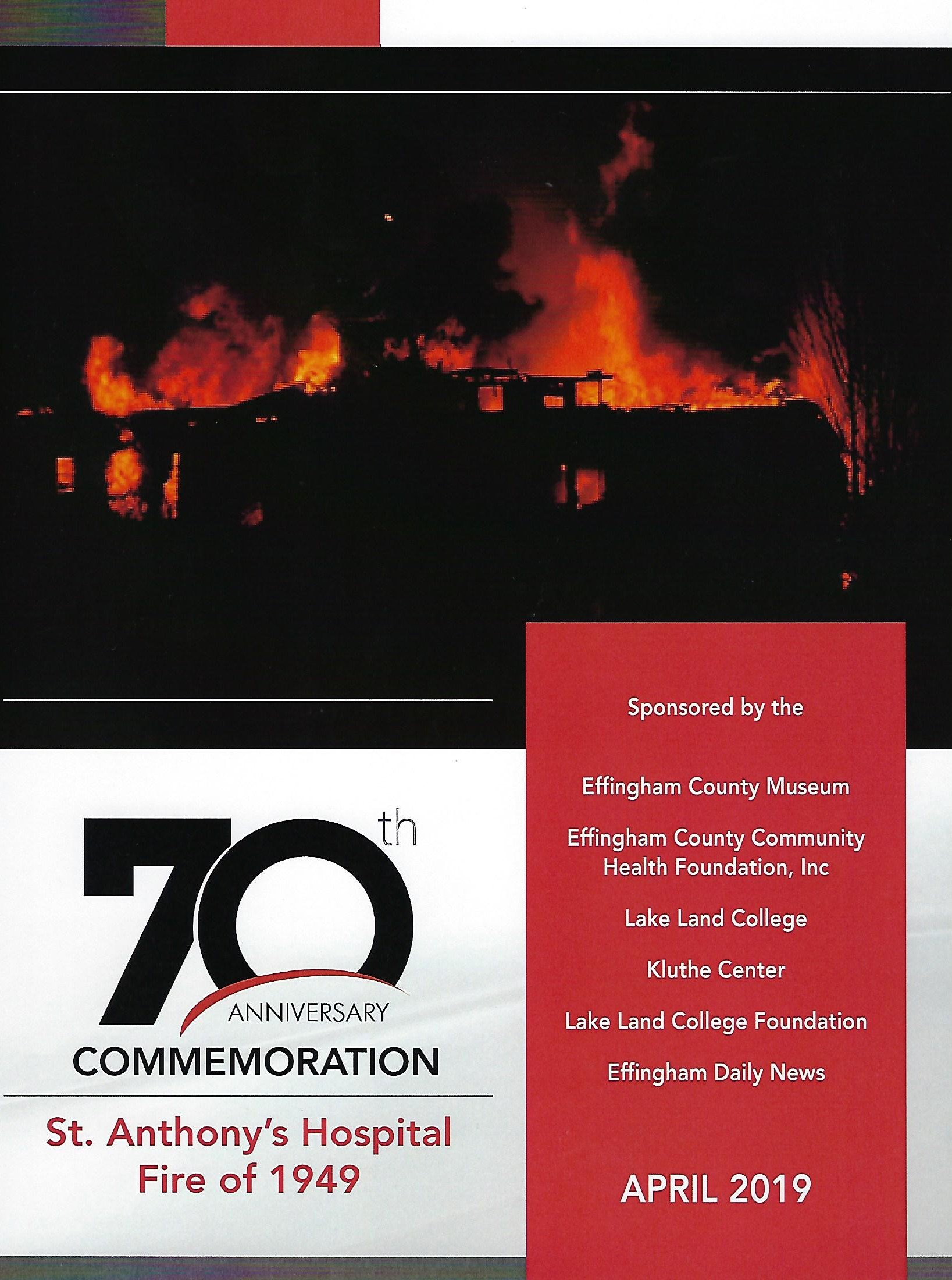
Fire Commemoration booklet

In April, the Museum commemorated the 70th anniversary of the 1949 St. Anthony Hospital fire, in conjunction with St. Anthony's Memorial Hospital, Lake Land College, the Lake Land Foundation, the Kluthe Center, the Effingham Community Health Foundation, and the Effingham Daily News. Illinois Humanities provided some financial support. The Lake Land Foundation published a souvenir program. An exhibit, posters with photographs and documents, along with a lecture series were provided by the Museum. Copies of fire victim Coroner Death Certificates were available to genealogists and visitors. The Effingham Daily News ran a series of interviews with people who remembered or were impacted by the fire.

Local historians shared their impressions of five influential women from Effingham's history during a Ladies Tea Party in July. Mary Ellen Eversman portrayed her relative, Alice M. Eversman. She spoke in Alice's voice and traced how Alice became an international opera star in the early 1900s. Alice was summoned as a last-minute replacement for the role of Aida in a Washington, D. C. opera, and her success opened many doors. Alice attended Sacred Heart Grade School. Nancy Broom Liss portrayed Kate Clutter, who was the nanny for Abraham Lincoln's children during the White House years. She lived in D.C. because her father worked at the Bureau of Engraving. After Lincoln's assassination, Kate moved to Effingham to care for her sister's children. Susan Temple played the part of Mary Newcomb. Newcomb was a volunteer Civil War nurse who came with her husband to Effingham at the start of the Civil War because it was their son's home. After her husband volunteered to serve and died of a wound infection, Newcomb served with Grant's Army on the battlefield and in hospitals for over four years. Jo Thomas acted the role of Ada Kepley, Effingham's first female attorney. She emphasized Kepley's zeal in fighting alcohol abuse among the men of Effingham in the late 1800s. Linda Ruholl played the part of Marjorie Scaife, the Supervisory Nurse at the Effingham County Health Department in the 1940s. After the 1949 St. Anthony Hospital fire, Scaife spearheaded the Home Delivery Service, providing maternity care to the women who had lost access to inpatient obstetric service through 1954.

=== Years 2020-2022: The Time of Covid ===
The Museum opened for the new year as scheduled at the beginning of March, 2020. The first Covid closure was triggered on March 16. The Museum reopened on June 30, 2020. A second Covid closure was initiated on November 9, 2020. The Museum stayed closed through the rest of 2020. There was no Christmas Open House that year, and the 2020-2021 Historic Lecture Series was cancelled. The Museum did not reopen until May 21, 2021. The Historic Lecture series resumed in the fall of 2021, but the January 2022 lecture was delayed and rescheduled due to a Covid resurgence.

The Museum remained compliant with Phase 4 of the Restore Illinois policies for non-profits. Covid had a major impact on Museum traffic in 2020 and 2021. Year 2021 saw a 79% decrease in the usual number of documented visitors. A documented visitor is defined as one who registers at the south door. This drop off was in line with visitation changes at museums across the United States. The American Association for State and Local History reported declines in traffic nationwide between 60 and 80 percent, with the Midwest region registering a 72% decline.

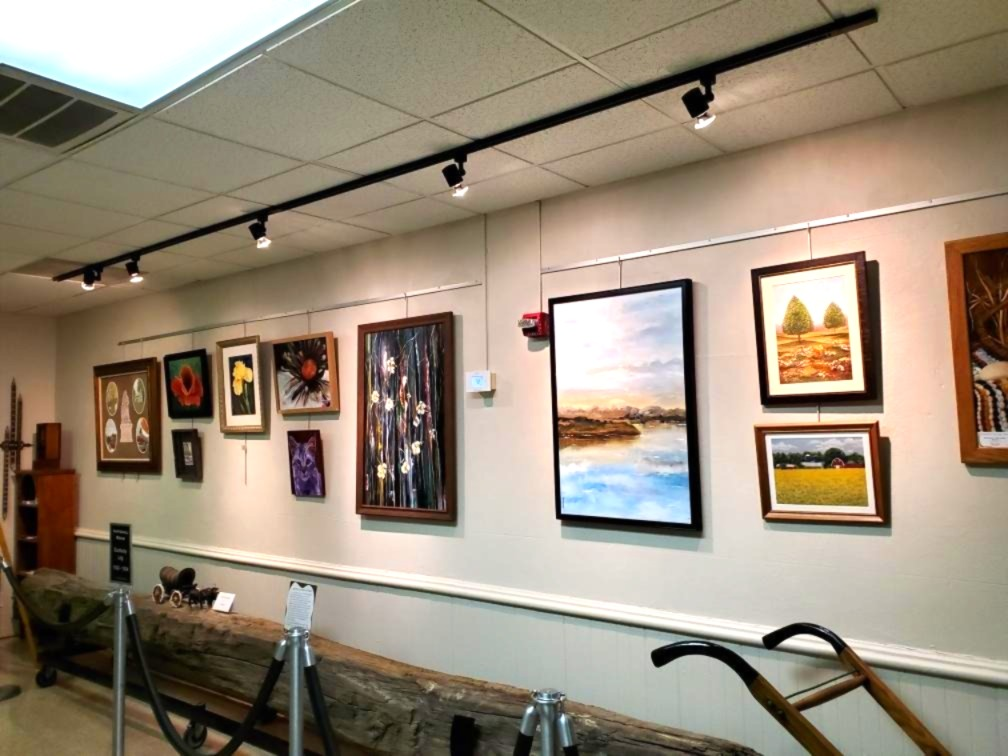
Art display system Level 1

Despite severely limited contact with visitors, the Museum volunteers continued to work during the pandemic. For example, a new artworks display system was installed in the central hallway. It was funded by a Jordan grant from the Southeastern Illinois Community Foundation. The Museum has a long-standing arrangement with the Effingham Art Guild to display their members' works along the west wall of Level 1. The rails, rods, and hooks of the system are strong and flexible, which allows for various size canvases and frames to be securely displayed. A major preservation goal for the Museum's historic structure is served, as there is no longer a need to put new holes in the plastered wall when paintings are rotated, nor do old holes have to be patched and painted.

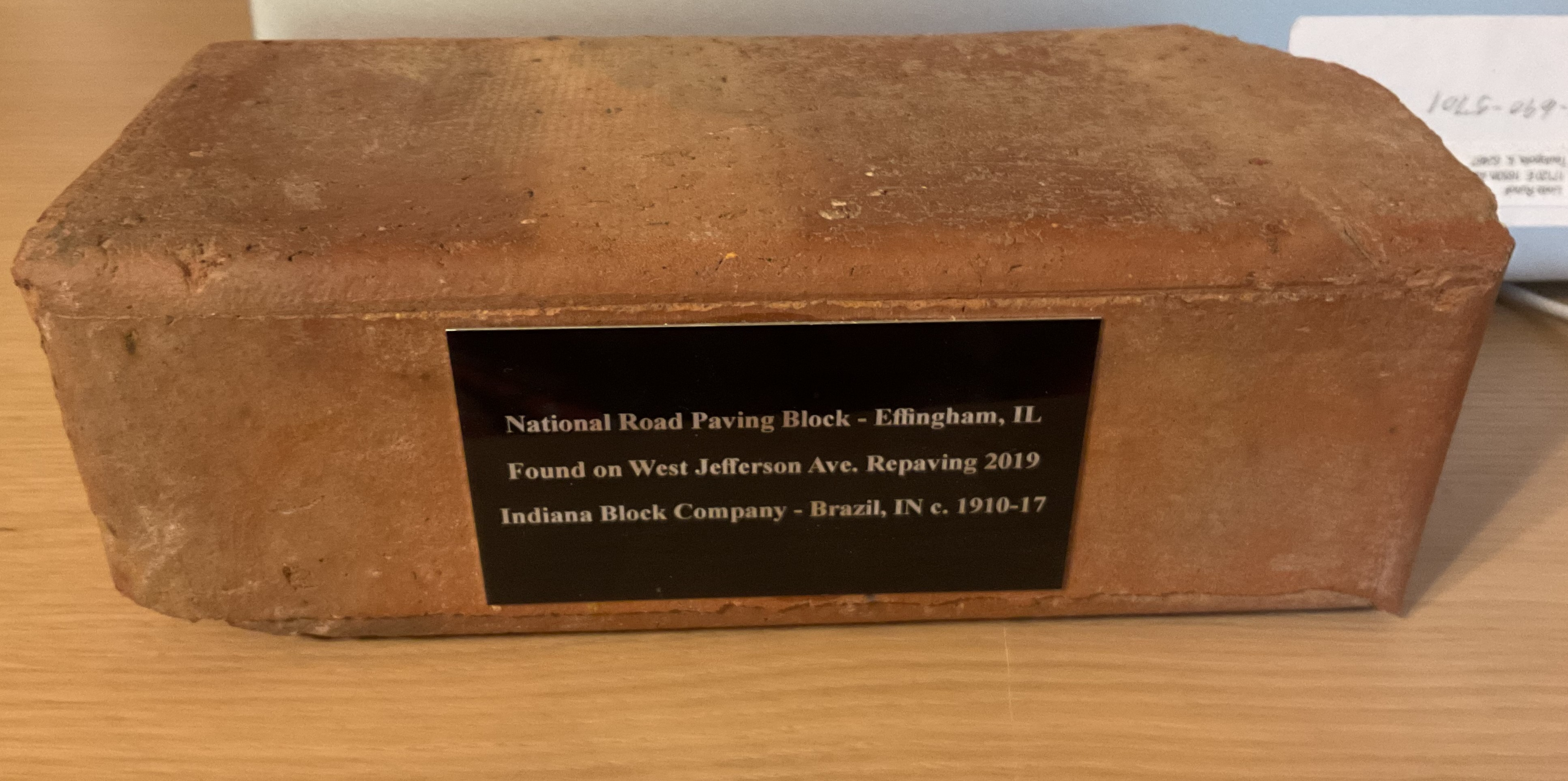
National Road paver

National Road historian Phil Lewis conducted a salvage project when the city of Effingham resurfaced a section of West Jefferson Avenue in 2019. Originally, the National Road was exactly parallel to the east/west railroad that ran through Effingham, but in the 20th century, a portion was moved slightly north to divert traffic into what is now downtown Effingham. As the city dug down to prepared the new street surface, a section of the 20th century diversion was exposed, and the National Road pavers were extracted. Mr. Lewis collected about 100 of them. In the fall of 2020, Museum volunteers cleaned the pavers, added a commemorative plaque, and offered them to the public for a small fee.

Local historians continued to write about local history for the Effingham Daily News Museum Page during this era. Stories from the 2020 rotation included:

- Early Trauma Care in Effingham County
- Vintage Advertising Sold Products and Services
- Places to Stay Back in the Day
- Austin College: Perpetual Struggle, Then Collapse
- Pleasures and Perils of Early Effingham County Hunting
- Sorrow Comes to Mason in 1924
- The Lind Family of Effingham
- Broken and Frightened Hearts on the Homefront During World War II
- Eighty Years of Devoted Service
- History of Soda Pop Bottling in Effingham County
- Life in Early Years of Effingham County
- Effingham County's Faith Community Provided County's Value Base
- Remembering the Rumores: Peter and Casilda
- History of Effingham County Dairy Companies
- Women and the 19th Amendment
- The 1930s Oil Boom and Effingham County
- What They Had in Common 1925-1945
- Elsie the Borden Cow and Effingham County
- From Jasper County to Effingham County
- Ellsworth B. Schooley: Good Citizen, Servant of the People
- The Adams Family Nurses
- History of Sadirons in American and Effingham County Hardware Stores
- Remembering the Days of Norge and Fedders in Effingham
- Effingham Business Ads Over a Century Ago
- St. John's Mercy School of Nursing, St. Louis, Missouri
- Gothic Revival Architectural Style: A Baptist Church and a Masonic Lodge

The Illinois State Historical Society's Best of Illinois History Awards Gala was scheduled for April 24, 2020 at the Inn at 825 Boutique Hotel In Springfield, Illinois. The Annual Awards presentations recognize individuals, groups and organizations that have furthered the collection, preservation, and interpretation of Illinois history. The Effingham County Museum was slated to receive a Certificate of Excellence in the Exhibitions and Special Projects category. The award was for the Commemoration of the St. Anthony Hospital Fire of 1949. Due to Covid, the awards ceremony was cancelled, and the Museum received the awards certificate in the mail in December.

The Old Settlers' Reunion was a virtual event in 2020. John Kirby was the Oldest Male Old Settler at age 96; he had lived in the county for 90 years. Genevieve Rentfro Shadwell was the Oldest Female Old Settler at age 98. She had lived in the county for 80 years.

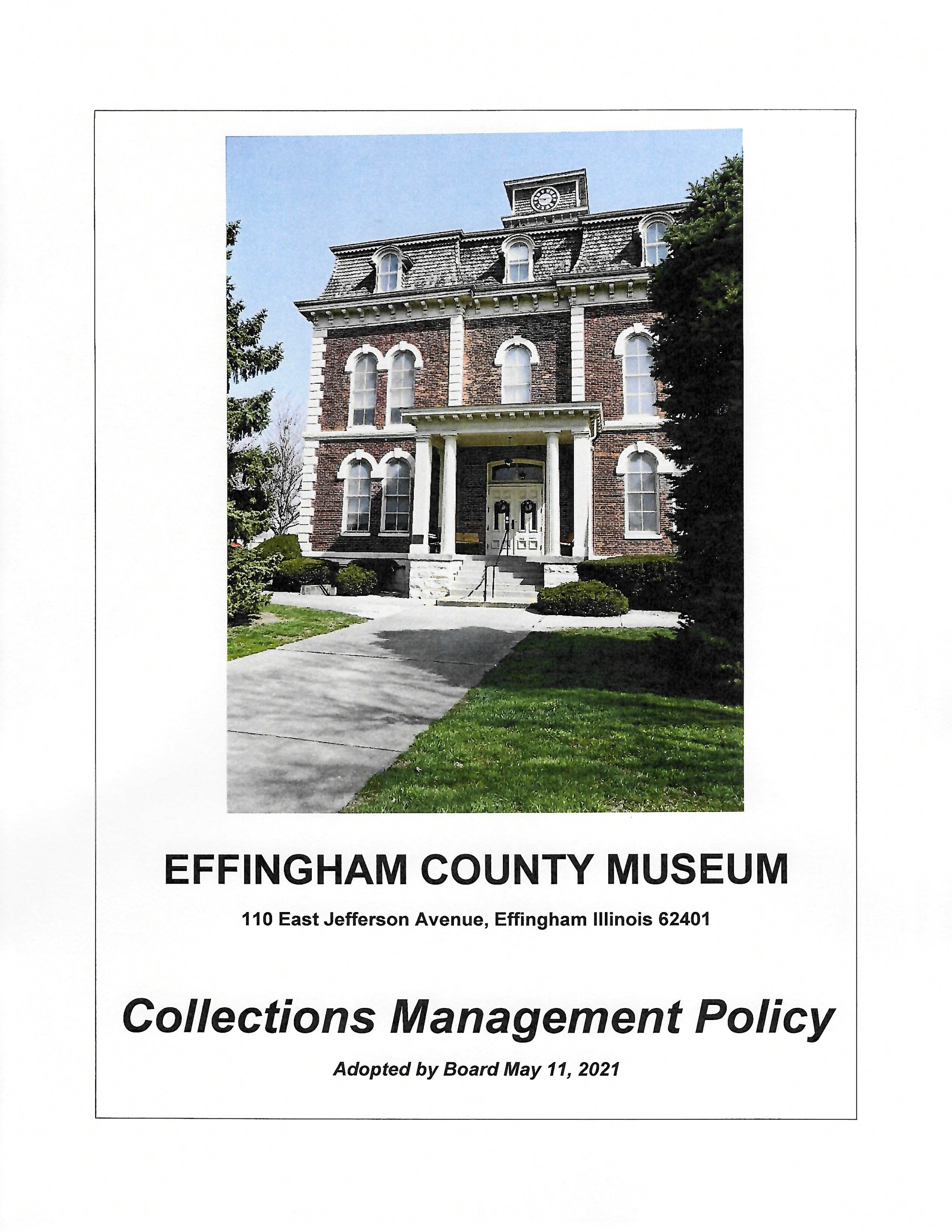
Collections Management Policy 2021

The Effingham County Museum received a Capacity Building Micro-grant from the Southeastern Community Foundation in early 2021. The funds were used to pay for tuition and books for Jane Ries and Linda Ruholl to attend an 8-week online course, Collections Management. The class was sponsored by the American Association for Stare and Local History. The instructor was Dr. Erin Richardson, who had over 20 years of experience with the Fenimore Art Museum in the Niagara Falls area. After successfully completing the class, the ECM attendees developed an updated Collections policy and presented it to the Museum Board. It was approved on May 11, 2021. The policy addressed the scope of ECM's collections, acquisition and accessions, deaccession and disposal, loans, access and use of materials, risk management, and insurance.

== Painting Project 2022 ==
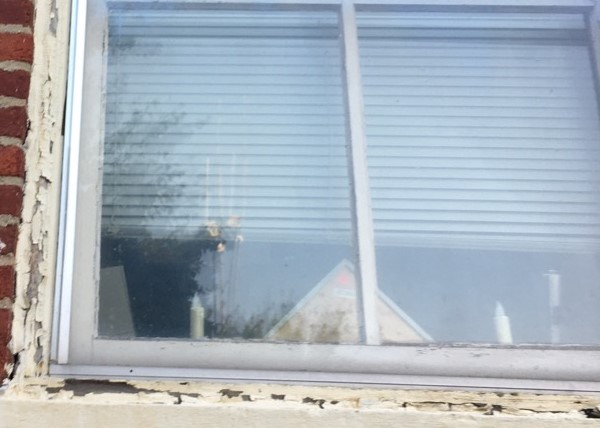
ECM window frame before Painting Project

The Mission of the Effingham County Museum is, in part, to preserve the building itself. The Museum's Structures Management Policy explicitly calls for building preservation. Painting of exposed surfaces is a classic means of exterior preservation. In addition, the 2018 Conservation for Preservation (CAP) architect's report called for the building to be painted.

A project to renew the paint began on May 23 and concluded on June 25, 2022. The work was carried out by the Dave Roepke Painting Crew. There were 5 or 6 days of rain delay, but otherwise the project moved forward in a linear fashion. On each day that the workers were present, there were two to five people on the job, and more than 500 man hours were devoted to the project. Sherman Williams paint was used and the color was custom matched to that already present.

The first phase of the project involved clearing off dust, dirt, and other debris. Alter that, irregular areas were scraped and sanded. Caulk smoothed out irregular spots. A coat of primer was applied next, followed by two coats of paint. Because of the building's height, much of the work was completed from lifts. The lifts had a reach capacity of 40, 50, and 130 feet.

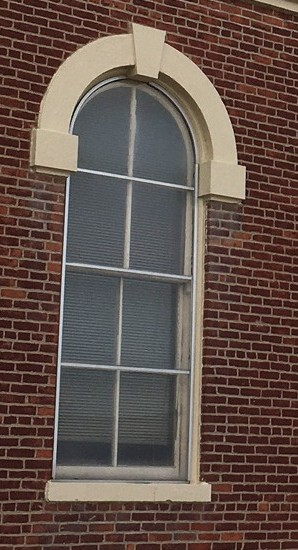
ECM window after Painting Project

The cost of the exterior painting project was $75,760. Because the building is owned by the county and leased to the non-profit (Effingham County Cultural Center and Museum Association), prevailing wage applied. Two specific grants helped the Museum volunteers with the funding. The Midland Bank Foundation contributed $10,000. Landmarks Illinois granted $4,000. The Effingham County Museum was one of three Illinois applicants to the Preservation Heritage Fund of Landmarks Illinois to be funded in 2022. ECM was the oldest of the three buildings. The other two grantees were in metro areas. Preservation Incorporated of Springfield received $5,000 to stabilize a 1908 structure, the Ursala Hall Music Conservatory. The third award went to Chicago. The 1888 Evangelical Lutheran Church, on the west side, received $5,000 to install a new boiler. Many local Friend of the Effingham County Museum also helped, with donations coming from 70 individuals and businesses.

== Improvements 2023-2025 ==
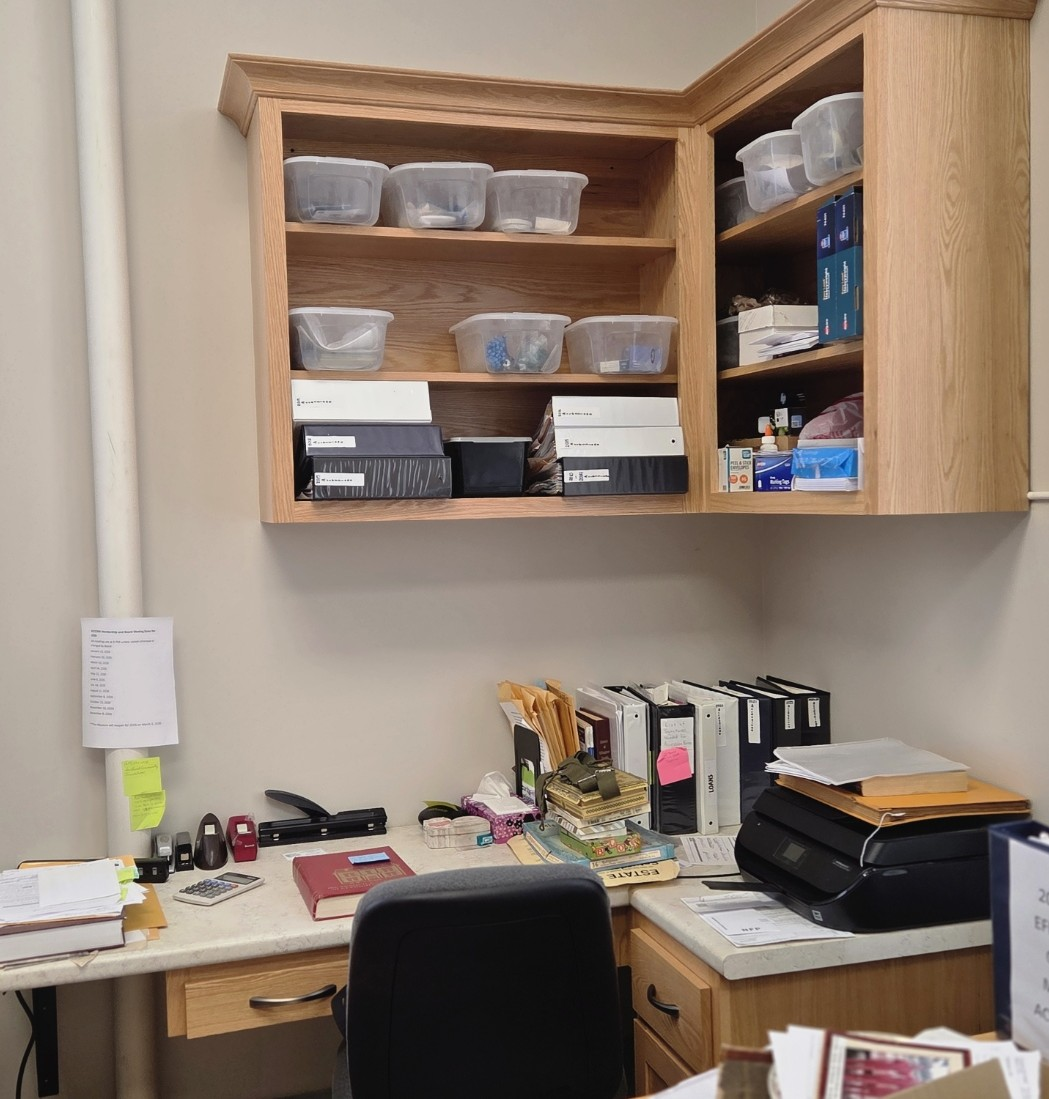
Collections Manager desk, ECM

A Collections Management room was created from an underutilized store room on the first level in 2023. This fulfilled recommendations from the 2018 Conservation for Preservation visit, which included:

- Locate collections documents in a secure place,
- Create duplicate copies off-site,
- Develop a collections suite, with separate areas for preparation and documentation,
- Move non-collection items to the basement.

The Museum's mansard roof and clock tower roof were replaced in 2024-2025. This addressed three recommendations made by architect Anne McGuire in her portion of the 2018 Conservation for Preservation (CAP) report, namely: (1) assess the condition of the roof membrane, (2) reroof the mansard, and (3) reroof the clock tower. A mansard roof is a hip style roof. It has two slopes, with the lower slope at a steeper angle that the upper slope. Mansard roofs are often punctuated by dormer windows, and that is true of the Effingham County Museum.

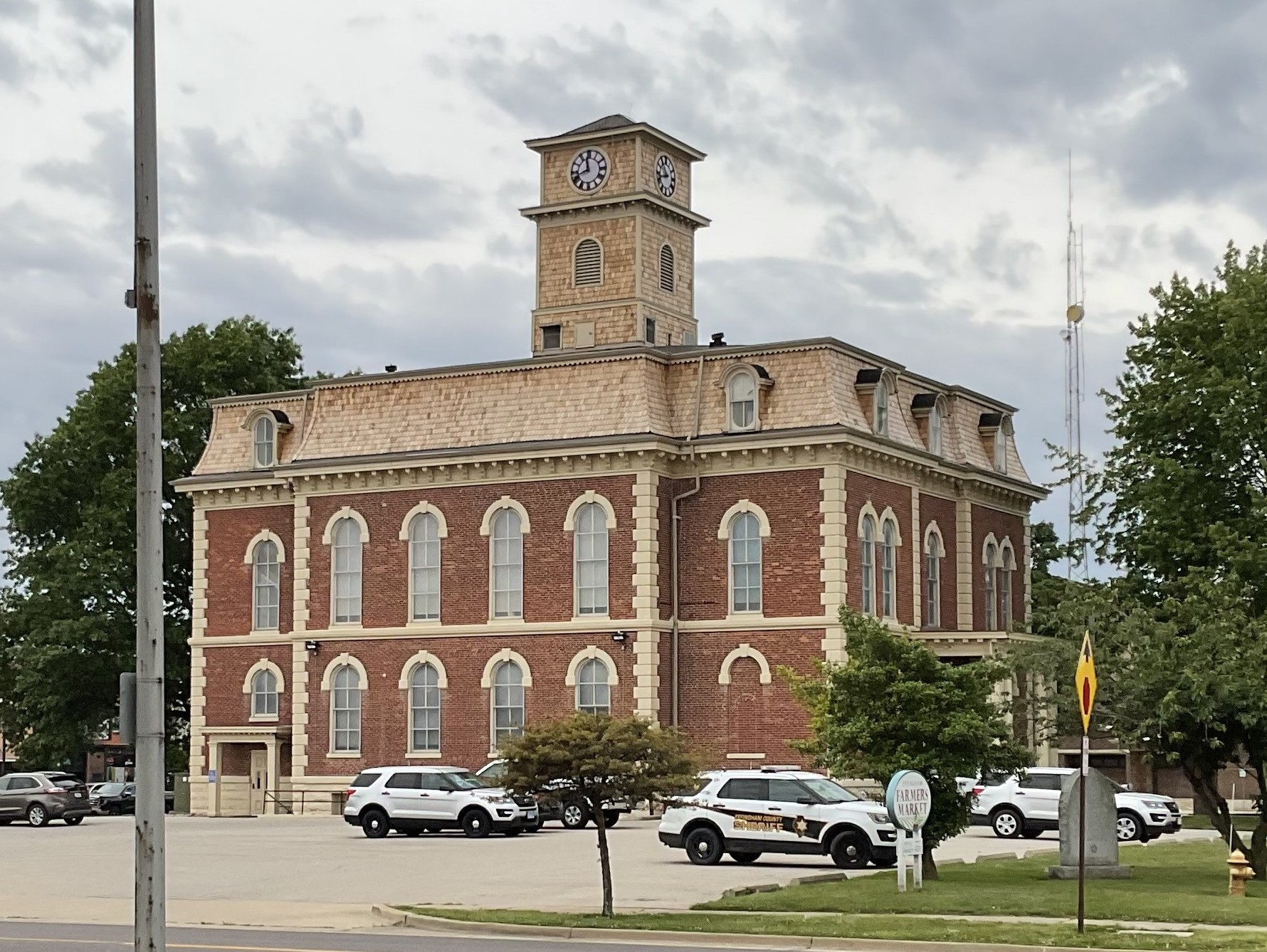
Reroofed Effingham County Museum, from across Route 45, in 2025

A hard rain in the summer of 2024 lent urgency to the roofing issue. The area over the south portico leaked and produced some interior damage. The Museum had that leak repaired. A Museum volunteer photographed the membrane and that picture confirmed the membrane had deteriorated. Photographs also demonstrated that the cedar shakes, which were 45 years old, were at the end of their useful life. The deterioration of the membrane and the shakes was causing moisture saturation in the masonry wall.

The Museum Board approached to the county board's Tax and Finance Committee in September of 2024 with a request for help with the roof repairs. After a period of research, the county, which owns the building, paid for the mansard and membrane costs. The low bid was accepted, which was for $168,495.00. That also included replacement gutters and downspouts. The Museum covered the $40,000 bill for the clock tower.
