= List of county courthouses in Illinois =

This list of county courthouses in Illinois provides information about each current Illinois county courthouse: name, photograph, city, construction year, and further comments.

Each of the 102 county governments in the U.S. state of Illinois operates out of a building or complex of buildings known as the county's courthouse. The community in which the courthouse is located is known as the county seat. The oldest current courthouse is the Putnam County Courthouse, built in 1839, while other courthouses have been built since 2010. Many courthouses were built following the destruction of previous buildings, either planned or unplanned; however, some former courthouses still stand, many of which have been repurposed as museums or as offices for other governmental agencies.

Fifty-seven of these courthouses were constructed between the end of the Civil War and American entry into the First World War; extant courthouses from this period tend to reflect the Romanesque Revival, Second Empire, and Neoclassical architectural styles, while several older courthouses are Greek Revival buildings, and many twentieth-century courthouses are modernist structures.

== List ==
Thirty-eight courthouses in the state either are listed on the National Register of Historic Places or are located within Register-listed historic districts; these are marked with a †dagger or ‡double dagger respectively, or with both if applicable.

Courthouse	Image	Location	Year built	Comments
Adams		Quincy; 39°56′6″N 91°24′28″W	1950	Built to replace a former courthouse destroyed by a tornado
Alexander		Cairo; 37°0′20″N 89°10′34″W	1965	Modernist building from the 1960s; one of two extant courthouses in Cairo, along with the Old Customhouse. Previous courthouse in Thebes is still standing
Bond		Greenville; 38°53′33″N 89°24′46″W	1884	Bond County's fourth courthouse
Boone		Belvidere; 42°15′54″N 88°50′42″W	1855	Second-oldest Illinois courthouse in continuous use; a cluster of three buildings combined into one
Brown‡		Mount Sterling; 39°59′12″N 90°45′51″W	1868	Neoclassical structure, almost completely destroyed by fire in 1939; restored post-fire with modifications
Bureau‡		Princeton; 41°22′5″N 89°27′57″W	1936	Art Deco structure built by the WPA; functionally unchanged from original state
Calhoun		Hardin; 39°9′25″N 90°37′6″W	1848	Expanded in 1978; built under direction of contractor William D. Hamilton
Carroll†‡		Mount Carroll; 42°6′3″N 89°58′42″W	1858	Neoclassical structure; used continuously since 1856, at which time it was incomplete
Cass		Virginia; 39°57′2″N 90°12′38″W	1875	Second courthouse in Virginia; substantially modified, including several expansions Previous courthouse in Beardstown still standing.
Champaign		Urbana; 40°6′43″N 88°12′23″W	1901	Romanesque Revival structure of stone with clock tower
Christian‡		Taylorville; 39°32′56″N 89°17′44″W	1901	County's third courthouse; features a central clock tower
Clark‡		Marshall; 39°23′24″N 87°41′46″W	1904	Fifth courthouse for the county; features a central clock tower
Clay†		Louisville; 38°46′20″N 88°30′6″W	1912	Neoclassical structure, built under the guise of remodelling the previous courthouse; not substantially modified from original construction
Clinton		Carlyle; 38°36′39″N 89°22′6″W	1999	Replaced the 150-year-old previous courthouse
Coles†		Charleston; 39°29′42″N 88°10′30″W	1898	Richardsonian Romanesque structure, one of the best in east central Illinois
Cook		Chicago; 41°53′2″N 87°37′49″W	1965	Modernist skyscraper, the Richard J. Daley Center
Crawford		Robinson; 39°0′19″N 87°44′22″W	1896	Romanesque Revival structure built with a central tower; now towerless
Cumberland†		Toledo; 39°16′22″N 88°14′41″W	1887	Italianate-influenced structure built on the site of the previous courthouse
DeKalb‡		Sycamore; 41°59′22″N 88°41′6″W	1905	Neoclassical structure with prominent pediment above entrance; functionally unchanged from original construction
DeWitt		Clinton; 40°9′14″N 88°57′44″W	1986	Modernist structure
Douglas		Tuscola; 39°47′45″N 88°17′7″W	1913	Neoclassical structure; virtually unchanged from original state
DuPage		Wheaton; 41°52′7″N 88°8′19″W	1990	Part of a large Postmodernist office complex; previous courthouse is still standing
Edgar†		Paris; 39°36′42″N 87°41′44″W	1893	Romanesque Revival structure, octagonal in shape
Edwards		Albion; 38°22′39″N 88°3′26″W	1888	Brick structure with central clock tower; substantially altered since original construction
Effingham		Effingham; 39°7′18″N 88°32′35″W	2007	Modernist structure; previous courthouse is still standing
Fayette		Vandalia; 38°57′36″N 89°5′58″W	Unknown	The Frederick Remann House, a converted and expanded farmhouse; previous courthouse was the old state capitol
Ford		Paxton; 40°27′47″N 88°5′57″W	1908	Neoclassical structure with a copper dome; not substantially altered since construction
Franklin		Benton; 37°59′48″N 88°55′14″W	1874	Brick structure with one-story wings, added after construction
Fulton		Lewistown; 40°23′49″N 90°9′20″W	1897	Second Empire structure; built after the previous structure was destroyed by fire
Gallatin		Shawneetown; 37°43′2″N 88°11′11″W	1939	Art Deco structure built after the previous courthouse and all Old Shawneetown was ruined by the Great Flood of 1937
Greene‡		Carrollton; 39°18′6″N 90°24′30″W	1892	Romanesque Revival structure; features clock tower at front
Grundy‡		Morris; 41°21′25″N 88°25′23″W	1913	Stone structure with elaborate murals; built around the previous courthouse
Hamilton		McLeansboro; 38°5′36″N 88°32′9″W	1938	Art Deco structure built by the WPA; no substantial modifications since construction
Hancock‡		Carthage; 40°24′47″N 91°8′7″W	1908	Neoclassical structure; built with domed tower
Hardin		Elizabethtown; 37°26′50″N 88°18′17″W	1927	Brick structure built for less than $3,750; includes prominent 1923 war memorial
Henderson		Oquawka; 40°56′8″N 90°57′12″W	1842	Greek Revival structure; features four large columns at entrance
Henry†		Cambridge; 41°18′8″N 90°11′48″W	1880	Second Empire structure; designed by prominent Indiana courthouse architect Thomas J. Tolan
Iroquois		Watseka; 40°46′18″N 87°43′8″W	1966	Modernist structure built by donation; previous courthouse is still standing
Jackson†		Murphysboro; 37°45′50″N 89°20′6″W	1927	Neoclassical structure; built after its predecessor was destroyed in a tornado
Jasper		Newton; 38°59′25″N 88°9′43″W	1876	Extensively altered from original construction; built with a central clock tower
Jefferson		Mount Vernon; 38°19′2″N 88°54′11″W	1939	Art Deco structure; built by the WPA; one of two extant courthouses in Mount Vernon, along with the Appellate Court, 5th District
Jersey†‡		Jerseyville; 39°7′9″N 90°19′45″W	1893	Romanesque Revival structure of limestone; features a central tower
Jo Daviess‡		Galena; 42°25′6″N 90°25′32″W	1845	Originally a squarish brick building with a tower; remodelled by removing the tower and being greatly expanded to the rear
Johnson†		Vienna; 37°24′52″N 88°53′47″W	1871	Italianate square building; features cupola with public clock
Kane		Geneva; 41°52′47″N 88°18′30″W	1993	Modernist structure, a contemporary office complex
Kankakee†		Kankakee; 41°7′9″N 87°51′38″W	1912	Neoclassical structure; topped with a domed clock tower
Kendall		Yorkville; 41°39′34″N 88°27′43″W	2008	Postmodernist structure, a contemporary office complex; previous courthouse is still standing
Knox‡		Galesburg; 40°56′40″N 90°22′14″W	1887	Romanesque Revival structure of stone; previous courthouse in Knoxville is still standing
Lake		Waukegan; 42°21′38″N 87°49′59″W	1967	Modernist small skyscraper; a contemporary office complex
LaSalle		Ottawa; 41°20′46″N 88°50′32″W	1883	Romanesque Revival structure of stone; modified from its original form
Lawrence†		Lawrenceville; 38°43′44″N 87°40′57″W	1888	Brick structure with octagonal clock tower; designed by the McDonald Brothers, architects for many Kentucky courthouses
Lee‡		Dixon; 41°50′32″N 89°28′53″W	1900	Neoclassical structure with Ionic columns; features a central dome
Livingston		Pontiac; 40°52′48″N 88°37′45″W	2011	Replaced a previous courthouse that was preserved, a structure built around a central clock tower
Logan‡		Lincoln; 40°8′46″N 89°21′45″W	1905	Neoclassical structure with dome; not substantially modified since original construction. Previous courthouse in Mount Pulaski is still standing
Macon		Decatur; 39°50′24″N 88°57′14″W	1940	Art Deco structure built by the WPA; not substantially modified since original construction
Macoupin‡		Carlinville; 39°16′45″N 89°52′45″W	1870	Neoclassical structure, the largest courthouse in the country upon its completion, and larger than the Old State Capitol in Springfield
Madison		Edwardsville; 38°48′45″N 89°57′28″W	1913	Neo-Renaissance structure built of marble; the fourth courthouse to serve the county
Marion		Salem; 38°37′39″N 88°56′42″W	1910	Neoclassical structure; not substantially modified since construction
Marshall		Lacon; 41°1′30″N 89°24′28″W	1853	Italianate structure; built as a Greek Revival structure but modified in the 1880s
Mason		Havana; 40°18′2″N 90°3′42″W	1882	Greek Revival structure built to plans from 1851; expanded and greatly modified in the 1960s
Massac		Metropolis; 37°9′7″N 88°43′59″W	1942	Neoclassical structure of brick; occupies site of previous courthouse
McDonough†‡		Macomb; 40°27′32″N 90°40′16″W	1872	Second Empire structure; original mansard roof replaced after severe storm in 1890
McHenry		Woodstock; 42°20′28″N 88°26′27″W	1972	Modernist office complex; previous courthouse is still standing
McLean		Bloomington; 40°28′40″N 88°59′39″W	1976	Modernist structure one block from the previous courthouse, which is still standing
Menard‡		Petersburg; 40°0′39″N 89°50′56″W	1898	Stone structure with timber framing; features a central dome
Mercer†‡		Aledo; 41°11′58″N 90°44′55″W	1894	Romanesque Revival structure with central clock tower
Monroe‡		Waterloo; 38°20′9″N 90°8′58″W	1851	Greek Revival structure; repeatedly expanded in the twentieth century
Montgomery		Hillsboro; 39°9′40″N 89°29′36″W	1993	Postmodernist structure, a contemporary office complex; previous courthouse is still standing
Morgan†		Jacksonville; 39°44′5″N 90°13′54″W	1869	Italianate structure with Second Empire influences
Moultrie†		Sullivan; 39°35′56″N 88°36′25″W	1904	Neoclassical structure with multiple Civil War monuments on the lawn
Ogle†‡		Oregon; 42°0′50″N 89°20′0″W	1891	Romanesque Revival structure with tower; retains original oak interior
Peoria		Peoria; 40°41′34″N 89°35′24″W	1962	Modernist structure; occupies the site of two previous courthouses
Perry		Pinckneyville; 38°4′50″N 89°22′55″W	1850	Built in several pieces; final portion built in 1939
Piatt‡		Monticello; 40°1′30″N 88°34′21″W	1903	Neoclassical structure; features a dome with rotunda
Pike‡		Pittsfield; 39°36′26″N 90°48′19″W	1894	Gothic Revival structure; features a central clock tower
Pope‡		Golconda; 37°22′0″N 88°29′5″W	1873	Two-story gabled structure; replaced a structurally deficient previous courthouse
Pulaski		Mound City; 37°5′23″N 89°9′44″W	1912	Three-story brick structure; badly damaged by the Great Flood of 1937
Putnam†		Hennepin; 41°15′12″N 89°20′33″W	1839	Greek Revival structure with Doric columns; oldest of all current Illinois courthouses
Randolph		Chester; 37°54′13″N 89°49′42″W	1972	Built around a spiral staircase with fountain in an atrium
Richland		Olney; 38°43′51″N 88°5′8″W	1914	Neoclassical structure; not substantially modified since original construction
Rock Island		Rock Island; 41°30′34″N 90°34′49″W	2001, 2018	Five-story Modernist structure; replaced the 1896 courthouse in 2018
St. Clair		Belleville; 38°30′47″N 89°59′7″W	1976	Modernist structure with attached parking garage and plaza
Saline		Harrisburg; 37°44′19″N 88°32′23″W	1967	Modernist structure, built of brick with few windows
Sangamon		Springfield; 39°48′0″N 89°38′36″W	1991	Modernist structure; built after the county stopped using the old state capitol as its courthouse
Schuyler		Rushville; 40°7′14″N 90°33′50″W	1882	Brick structure with corner clock tower and arcade
Scott‡		Winchester; 39°37′44″N 90°27′19″W	1885	Brick structure with onion dome atop tower; clock added to tower in 1917
Shelby‡		Shelbyville; 39°24′25″N 88°47′27″W	1881	Second Empire structure with clock tower; has an adjacent war memorial
Stark		Toulon; 41°5′36″N 89°51′57″W	1856	Greek Revival structure built from the plans for the Marshall County Courthouse
Stephenson		Freeport; 42°17′53″N 89°37′19″W	1974	Modernist structure with an adjacent Civil War memorial
Tazewell†		Pekin; 40°34′10″N 89°38′52″W	1916	Neoclassical structure with a skylight central atrium
Union		Jonesboro; 37°27′9″N 89°16′18″W	2013	Built beginning in 2012; previous courthouse, destroyed at the end of the project, was an extensively modified 1850s structure
Vermilion		Danville; 40°7′29″N 87°37′46″W	1910	Five-story stone building; shaped like the letter "L"
Wabash		Mount Carmel; 38°24′36″N 87°45′39″W	1881	Modernist structure; technically the same building as the 1881 courthouse, but nothing remains of the original structure
Warren‡		Monmouth; 40°54′45″N 90°38′57″W	1895	Features central clock tower, reduced in height in 1970 for structural reasons
Washington		Nashville; 38°20′39″N 89°22′59″W	1884	Third courthouse to serve the county; expanded in the 1960s
Wayne		Fairfield; 38°22′48″N 88°21′26″W	1891	Built with prominent tower on the facade; expanded in the 1950s
White		Carmi; 38°5′28″N 88°9′32″W	1883	Third courthouse, built on the site of the second; first courthouse was the still-standing Robinson-Stewart House
Whiteside		Morrison; 41°48′37″N 89°57′50″W	1987	Modernist structure, built of brick and glass
Will		Joliet; 41°31′28″N 88°4′56″W	1969	Modernist structure, built of concrete and glass
Williamson		Marion; 37°43′57″N 88°55′45″W	1971	Modernist brick structure; replaced a demolished 1889 courthouse on the public square
Winnebago		Rockford; 42°16′18″N 89°5′47″W	1968	Modernist structure, augmented by a separate criminal justice center
Woodford		Eureka; 40°43′19″N 89°16′20″W	1898	Neoclassical structure; a slightly modified version of the Berrien County Courthouse in southwestern Michigan. Previous courthouse in Metamora is still standing

== See also ==
- Postville Courthouse State Historic Site, 1950s reproduction of the 1840s Logan County Courthouse
