= Knox County Courthouse =

Knox County Courthouse may refer to:

- Knox County Courthouse (Galesburg, Illinois)
- Knox County Courthouse (Knoxville, Illinois)
- Knox County Courthouse (Kentucky), Barbourville, Kentucky
- Knox County Courthouse (Maine), Rockland, Maine
- Knox County Courthouse, part of the Edina Double Square Historic District in Missouri
- Knox County Courthouse (Nebraska), Center, Nebraska
- Knox County Courthouse (Ohio), Mount Vernon, Ohio
- Knox County Courthouse (Tennessee), Knoxville, Tennessee
- Knox County Courthouse (Texas), Benjamin, Texas
