= Cass County Courthouse =

Cass County Courthouse or Cass County Court House may refer to:

- Cass County Courthouse (Missouri), Harrisonville, Missouri
- Cass County Courthouse (Illinois), Virginia, Illinois, one of Illinois' county courthouses
- Cass County Courthouse (Michigan), Casspopolis, Michigan, a Michigan State Historic Site
- Cass County Courthouse (Iowa), Atlantic, Iowa
- Cass County Courthouse (Nebraska), Plattsmouth, Nebraska
- Cass County Court House, Jail, and Sheriff's House, Fargo, North Dakota
- Cass County Courthouse (Texas), Linden, Texas
