= Nobody Is Above the Law =

2018 protest

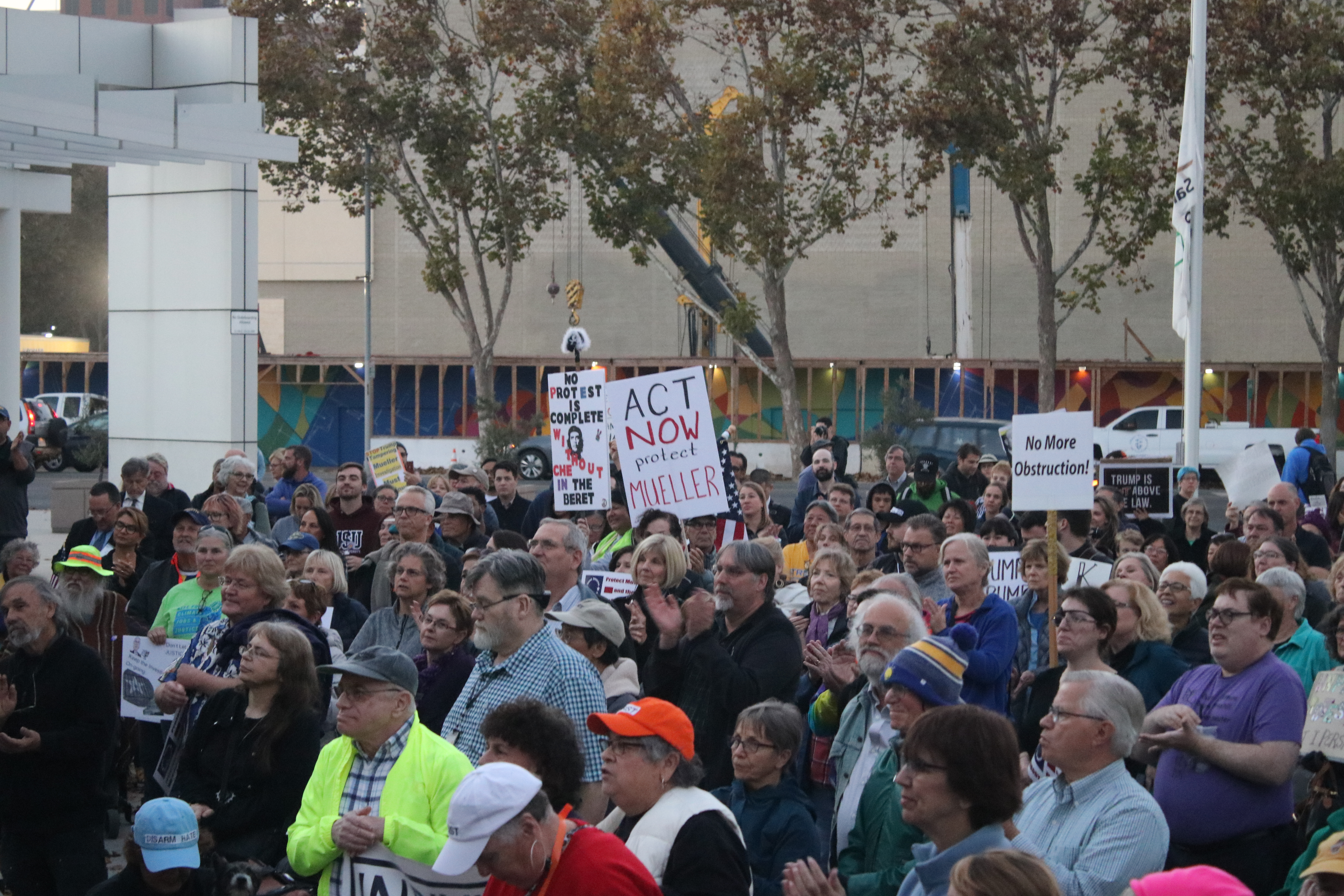
- Protest in San Jose, California
- Date: November 8, 2018
- Type: Demonstrations
- Organized by: MoveOn

Nobody Is Above the Law was a protest held on November 8, 2018, organized by MoveOn to protect the Special Counsel investigation headed by Robert Mueller. The nationwide demonstration saw events held in hundreds of cities, and followed President Donald Trump's appointment of Matthew Whitaker replacing Jeff Sessions as United States Attorney General. The hashtag '#ProtectMueller' trended on Twitter during the demonstration.

== Planning and promotion ==
The demonstration was organized by a national coalition of organizations called Trump Is Not Above the Law, including MoveOn, Common Cause, Indivisible, People for the American Way, March for Truth and Sierra Club.

== Locations ==
=== United States ===
==== Midwest ====
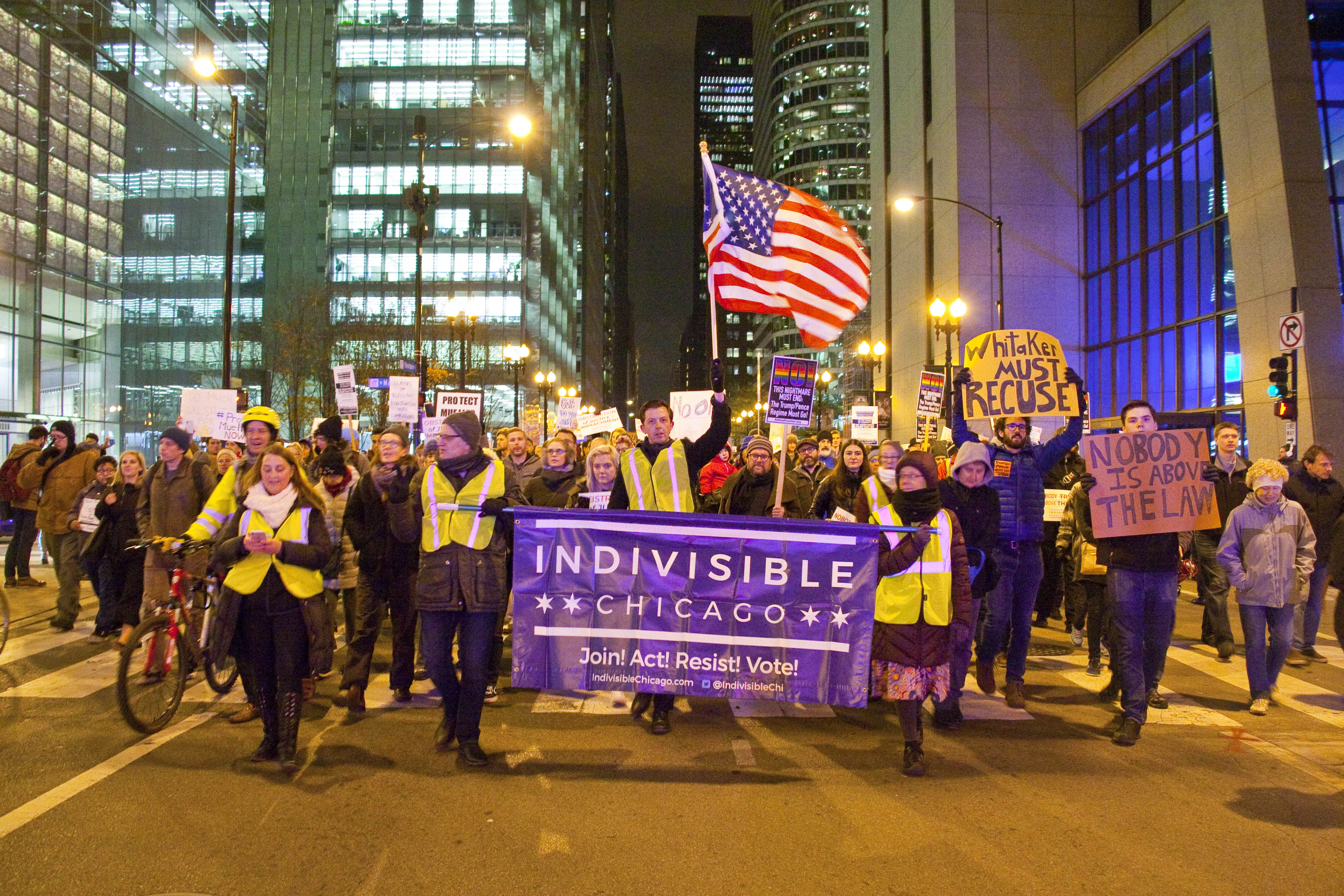
"Protect Mueller" rally in downtown Chicago.

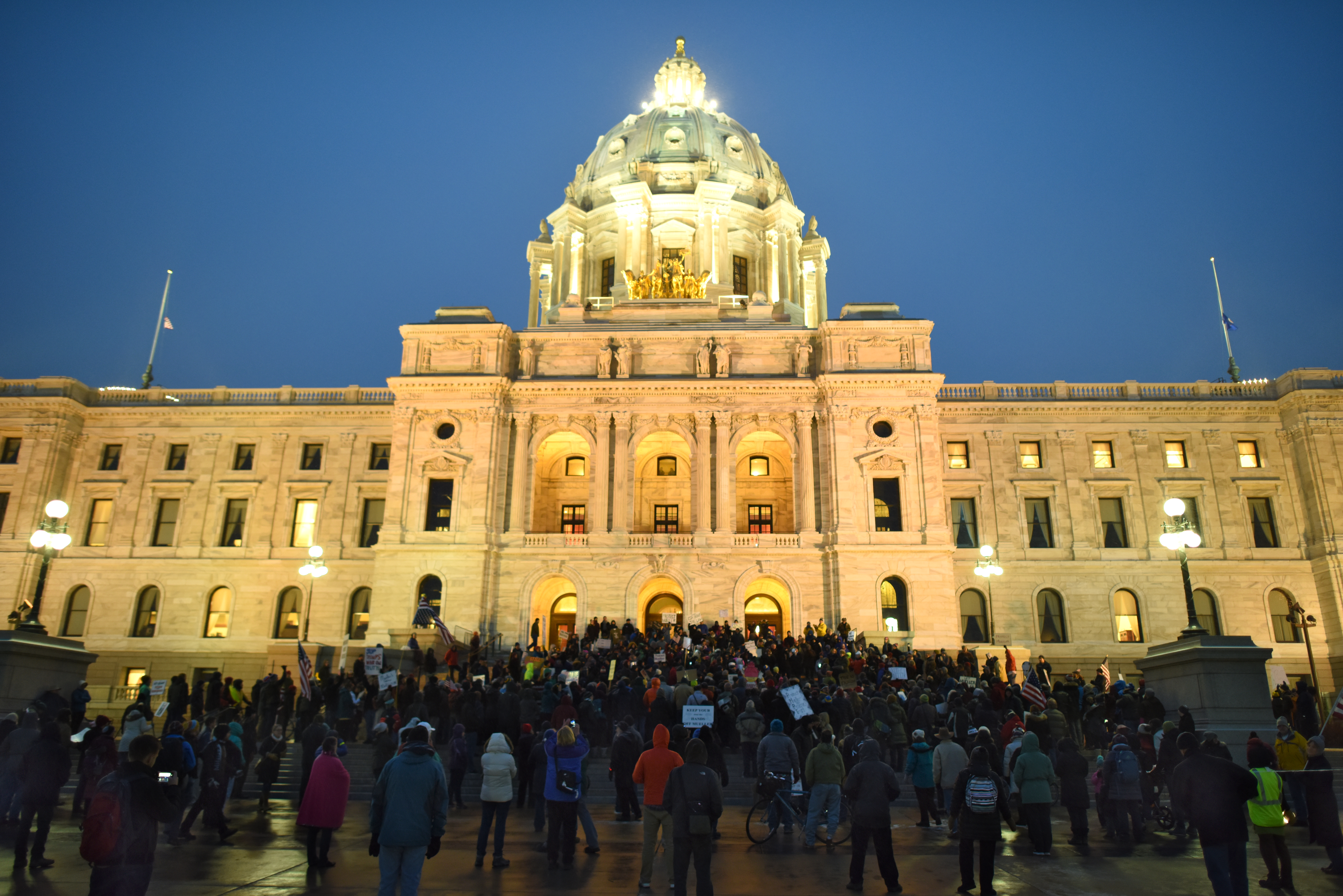
Protest at the Minnesota State Capitol.

In Illinois, protests were held in Carbondale, Chicago, and Rockford.

In Michigan, demonstrations were planned in Ann Arbor, Brighton, Detroit, Ferndale, Southgate, Troy, and Westland.

An event was planned in Minneapolis. Protestors gathered at Peace Plaza in Rochester, Minnesota. A small protest was held outside the Wadena County Courthouse in Wadena, Minnesota.

Ohio cities hosting events include Cincinnati, Cleveland, Columbus, and Westerville.

In Wisconsin, events were organized in Madison, Milwaukee, Rhinelander, and Wausau.

==== Northeast ====
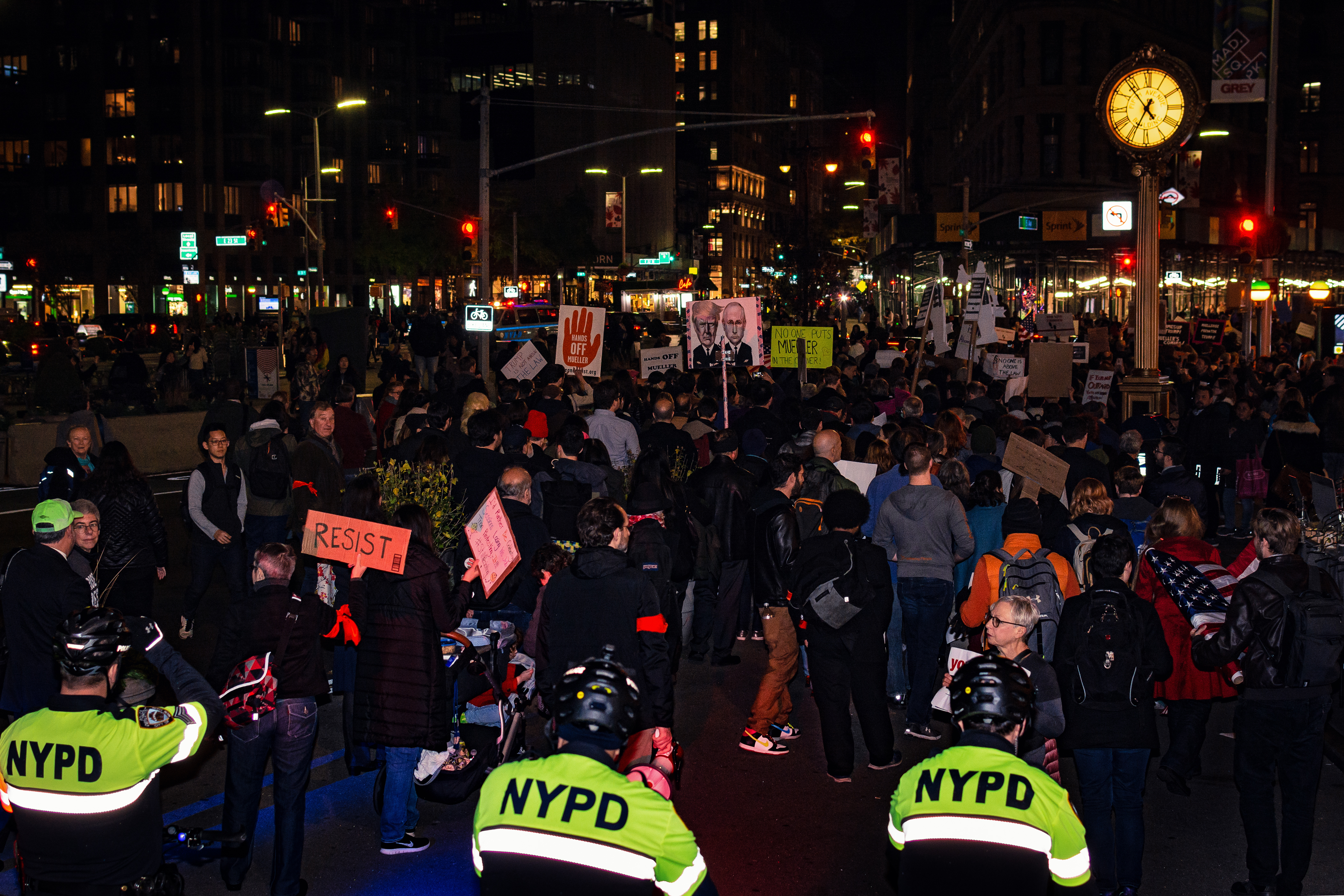
Protest in New York City

Dozens of protesters gathered in Hartford, Connecticut. U.S. Senator Richard Blumenthal spoke to a crowd of 300 on the New Haven Town Green; there were similar numbers in the towns of Greenwich and Norwalk.

Maine saw events in Belfast, Portland, and Rockland. Midcoast Maine Indivisible organized events in downtown Belfast and outside Rockland's Knox County Courthouse. In Portland, more than 300 people assembled at Monument Square and listened to guest speakers. According to the executive director of Mainers for Accountable Leadership, demonstrations were also planned in Augusta, Bangor, Brunswick, Kittery, and Lewiston. Bar Harbor, Eastport, Ellsworth, Farmington, Houlton, Newcastle, Prospect Harbor, South Paris, and Waterville also reportedly scheduled events.

In Massachusetts, protests were held in Boston, Great Barrington, New Bedford, and Pittsfield. The Boston rally took place on Boston Common. Approximately 100 protesters assembled outside Great Barrington's Town Hall, and more than 200 people gathered at Pittsfield's Park Square. The demonstrations were supported by the Berkshire Democratic Brigades, Greylock Together, and Indivisible Pittsfield. More than 200 people gathered outside the Keith Federal Building in New Bedford; the event was organized by the Coalition for Social Justice, Common Cause Massachusetts, Marching Forward Massachusetts, and We Won't Go Back. A protest was also held in Waltham, Massachusetts.

More than 100 demonstrators gathered outside the New Hampshire State House in Concord, New Hampshire. Events were also organized in Conway, Manchester, and Portsmouth.

New Jersey saw events in New Brunswick, Newark, and Westfield. The New Brunswick rally, organized by OurSociety and RU Progressive, saw more than 150 protesters gather outside City Hall. In Westfield, demonstrators gathered outside the offices of U.S. Representative Leonard Lance. The protest was organized by Summit Marches On.

Cities participating in New York included Albany, New York City, Rochester, Saratoga Springs, and White Plains. Thousands of demonstrators gathered in Manhattan's Times Square and Union Square. 6,000 marched from Times Square to Union Square in New York City. About 1,000 marched in Buffalo.

Pennsylvania saw demonstrations in Doylestown, Langhorne, and Philadelphia.

A demonstration was planned in Providence, Rhode Island.

Vermont saw demonstrators who brought traffic to a stop while they marched from the Federal Building to City Hall in Burlington. Events were also organized in Brattleboro, Castleton, Essex Junction, Manchester Center, Middlebury, Montpelier, Rutland, Springfield, Underhill, and Woodstock.

==== South ====
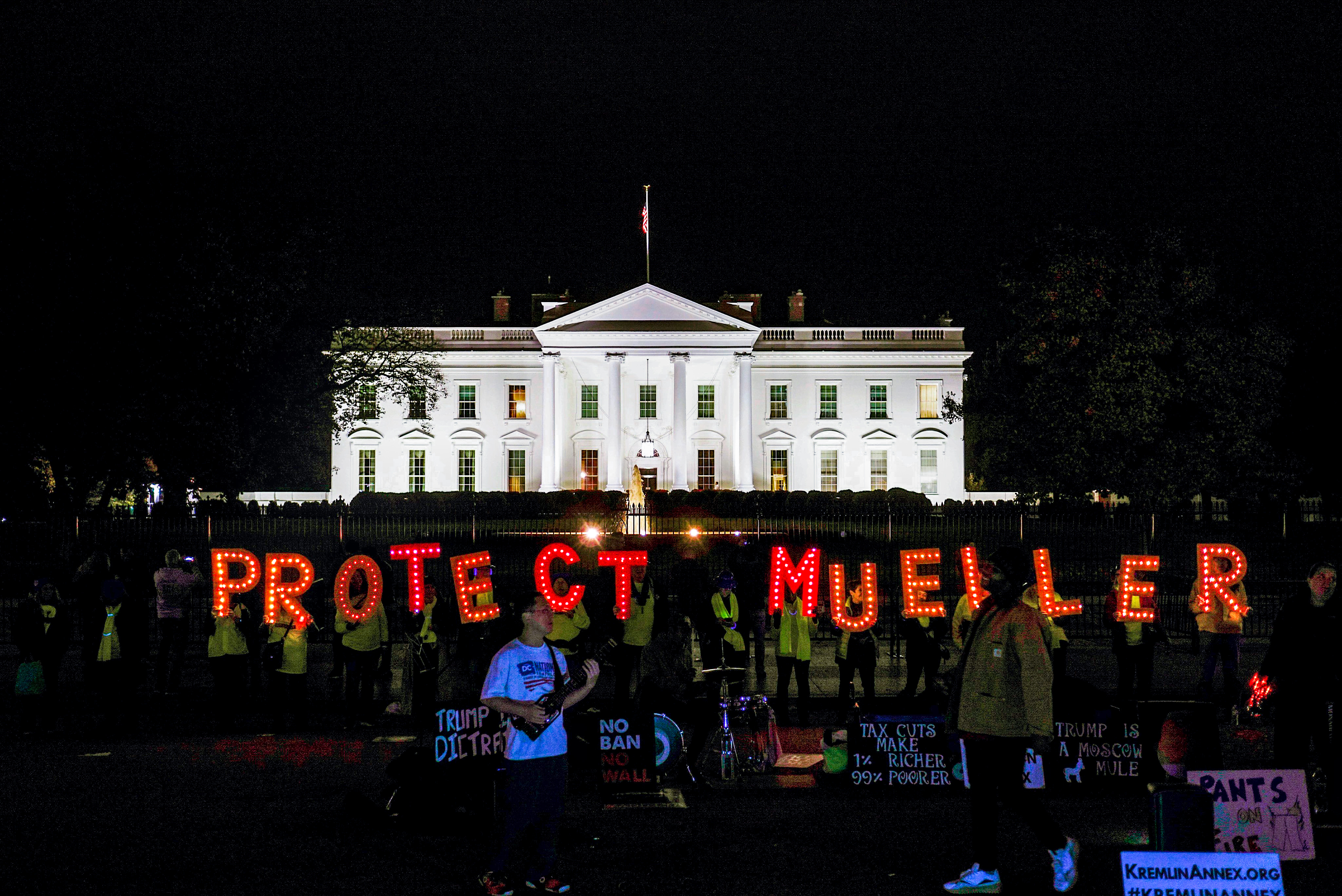
"Protect Mueller" rally outside the White House.

In Florida, events were planned in Cape Canaveral, Daytona Beach, Jacksonville, Melbourne, Miami, The Villages, and Winter Haven.

In Georgia, demonstrators gathered outside Atlanta's Richard B. Russell Federal Building.

Louisiana saw an event organized in Lafayette.

Maryland saw events in Annapolis, Baltimore, and Bel Air. Congressman Elijah Cummings spoke to a crowd of hundreds of demonstrators outside Baltimore's City Hall. Also present at the protest was Representative John Sarbanes.

North Carolina saw protests in Charlotte, the Piedmont Triad, and the Research Triangle. Hundreds of people marched in Raleigh.

A protest was planned in Oklahoma City.

Demonstrators gathered outside One City Plaza in Greenville, South Carolina.

Protesters gathered in Nashville, Tennessee.

Texas cities hosting demonstrations include Belton, College Station, Dallas, Houston, and San Antonio, and Waco.

In Virginia, events were organized in Arlington and Roanoke.

In Washington, D.C., a protest was held outside the White House.

Demonstrators gathered in Beckley, West Virginia.

==== West ====
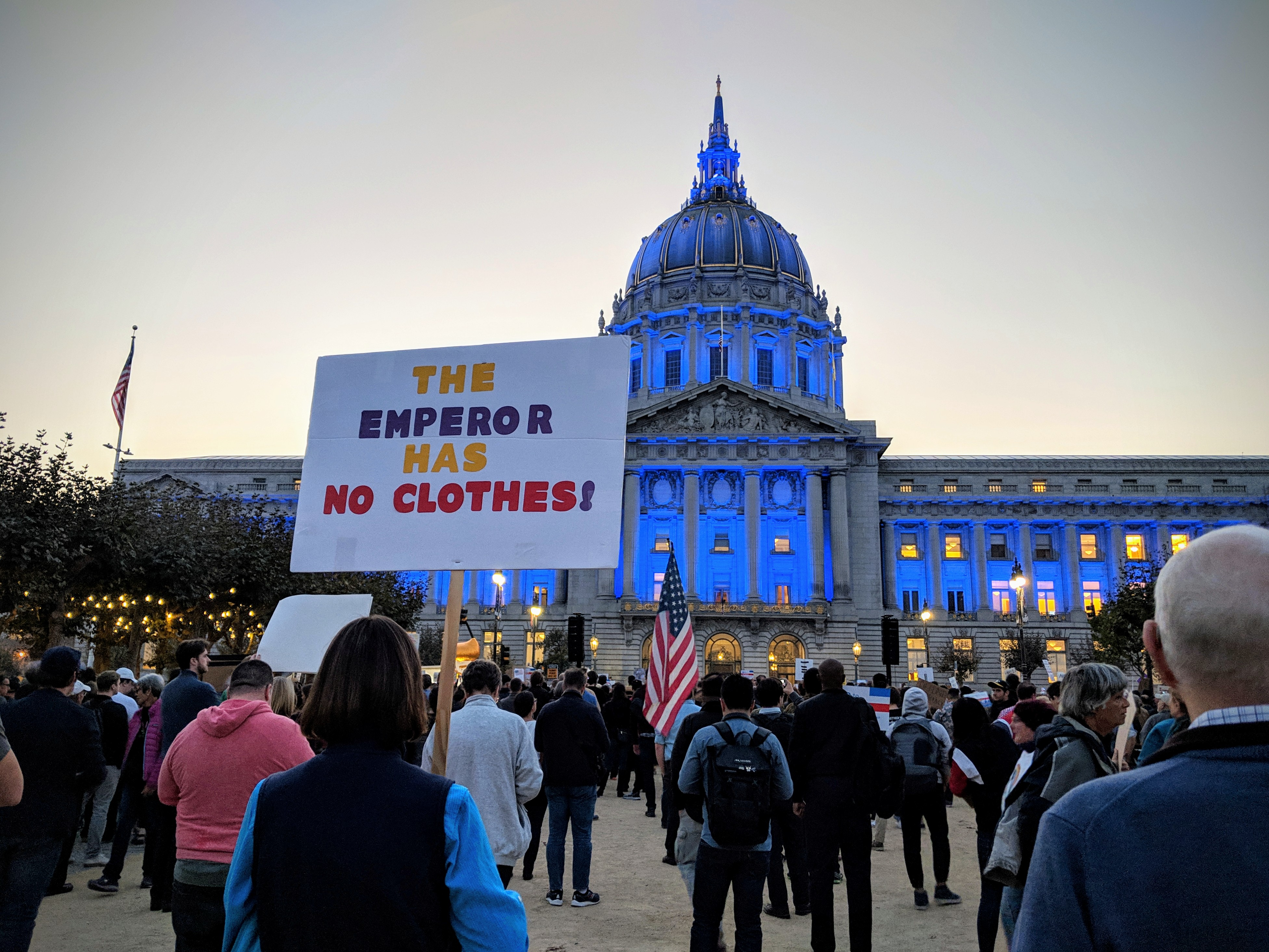
Protest in San Francisco

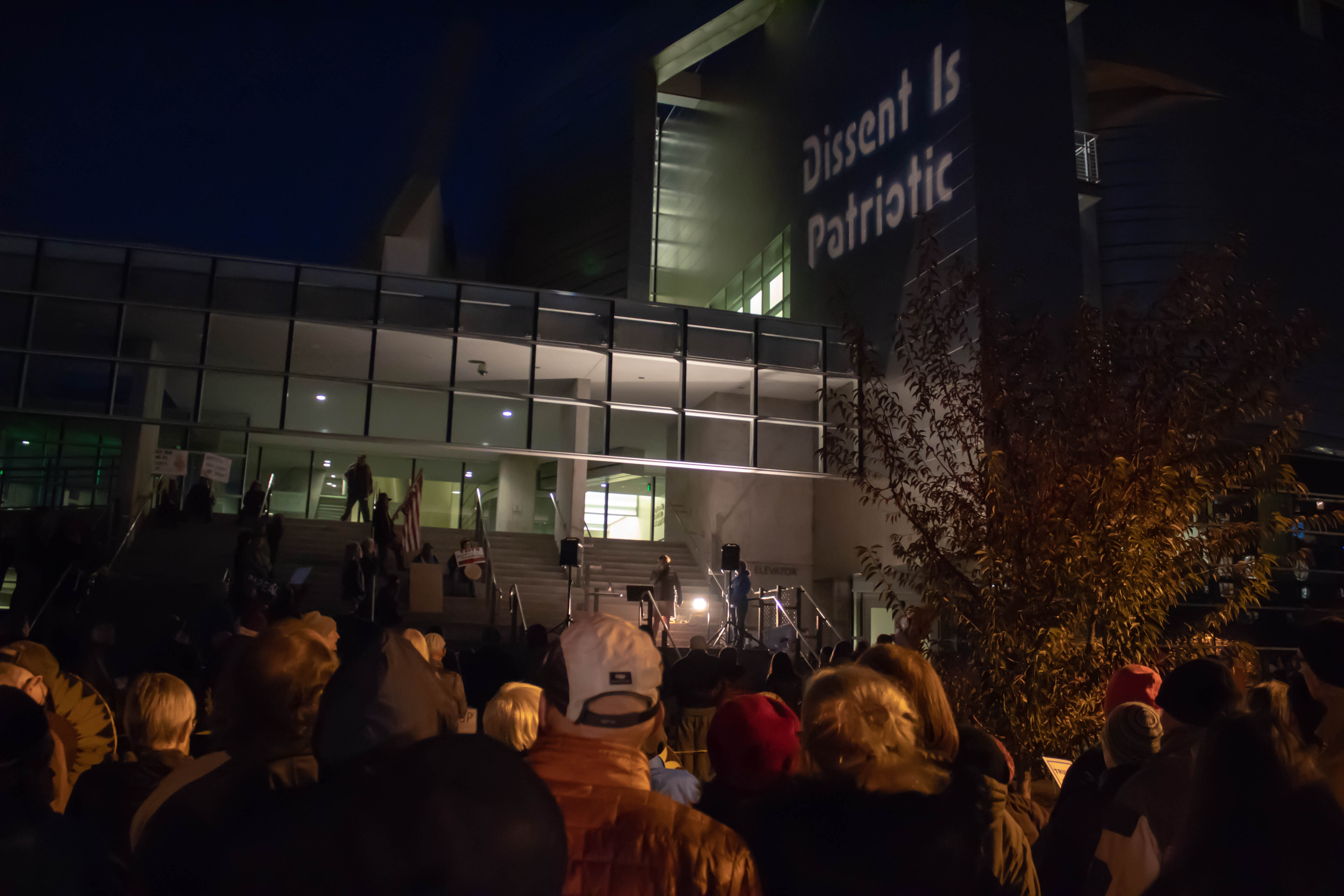
Demonstration in Eugene, Oregon

California cities planning demonstrations include Los Angeles, San Francisco, San Luis Obispo, and Santa Barbara. Representative Zoe Lofgren, a senior Democrat on the House Judiciary committee, spoke at the demonstration in San Jose.

Colorado saw protests in Boulder and Denver.

Protesters gathered outside the Lloyd D. George Federal Building in Las Vegas, Nevada.

An event was planned in Albuquerque, New Mexico.

In Oregon, protests were planned in Ashland, Beaverton, Grants Pass, Hillsboro, Lake Oswego, Medford, Portland, Salem, Sandy, Sherwood, St. Helens, and Yamhill County.

A protest was planned in Salt Lake City, Utah.

Washington saw events organized in Seattle and Vancouver.

==== Puerto Rico ====
In Puerto Rico, events were planned in Mayagüez and San Juan.

=== Outside the United States ===
Outside the United States, protests were planned in Amsterdam, Belfast, Brussels, and Rome. Participating cities in Canada include Calgary, Halifax, Montreal, Toronto, Vancouver, and Victoria, British Columbia.
