= Stark County Courthouse =

Stark County Courthouse can refer to:

- Stark County Courthouse (Illinois) in Toulon
- Stark County Courthouse (North Dakota) in Dickinson
- Stark County Courthouse (Ohio) in Canton
