= Fourth County Courthouse =

Fourth County Courthouse may refer to any of numerous courthouses that were fourth-built in their county, including:

- Washington County Courthouse (Illinois), Nashville, Illinois
- Bond County Courthouse, Greenville, Illinois
- Madison County Courthouse (Illinois), Edwardsville, Illinois

== See also ==
- Second County Courthouse (disambiguation)
- Third County Courthouse (disambiguation)
