= Richland County Courthouse =

Richland County Courthouse may refer to:

- Richland County Courthouse (Illinois)
- Richland County Courthouse (North Dakota)
- Richland County Courthouse (Ohio)
