= Rockland Residential Historic District =

Historic district in Maine, United States

- U.S. National Register of Historic Places
- U.S. Historic district
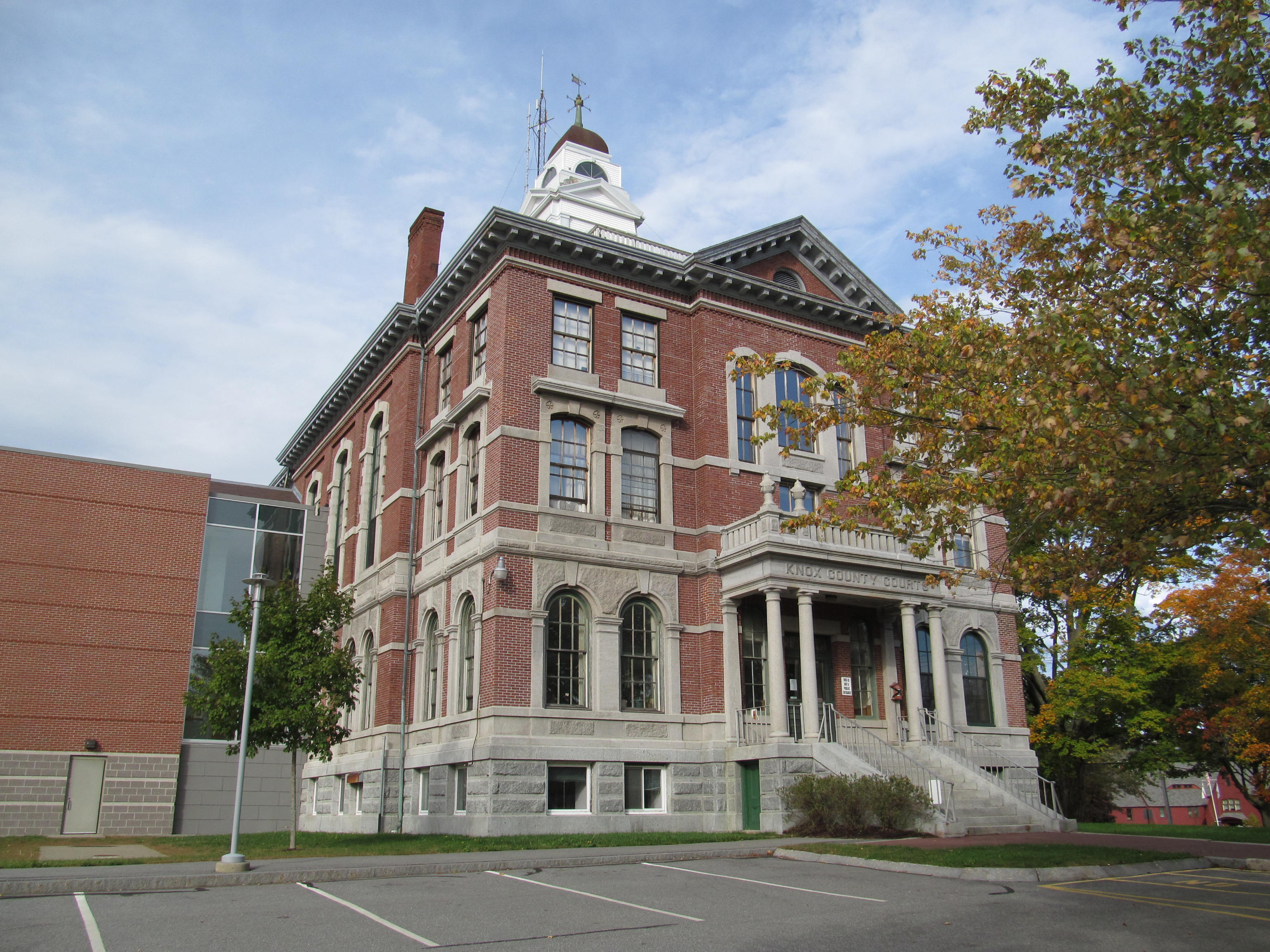
- The Knox County Courthouse

- Location within Maine Location within the United States
- Location: Roughly bounded by Granite, Union, Masonic, Broad, Limerock, and Broadway Sts., Rockland, Maine
- Coordinates: 44°6′18″N 69°6′53″W
- Area: 54 acres (22 ha)
- Built: 1840
- Architect: Bryant & Rogers; Et al.
- Architectural style: Greek Revival, Queen Anne, Italianate
- NRHP reference No.: 86003513
- Added to NRHP: April 15, 1987

The Rockland Residential Historic District encompasses a predominantly residential area west of the downtown of Rockland, Maine. With a history dating to the early 18th century, this area includes high quality examples of residential architecture, most dating to the period 1870–1920, and including several fine examples of municipal architecture. It was listed on the National Register of Historic Places in 1987.

== Description and history ==
The area that is now Rockland was settled as part of Thomaston in the late 18th century. The city's harbor proved a good shipbuilding location, and the area's limestone were developed as a locally significant lime-burning industry, with kilns lining parts of the shore. The area was incorporated as East Thomaston in 1848, and reincorporated as the city of Rockport in 1854. The city's commercial heart is located near its waterfront, and the area immediately to the west developed as a prime residential area.

The residential historic district is bounded on the east by Union Street, which forms the western boundary of the commercial Main Street Historic District. It is bounded on the north by Talbot Avenue, the south by Masonic, Broad, and Limerock Streets, and the west by Broadway. The area includes a number of fine pre-Civil War houses (typically Greek Revival in style), but its largest building boom began in the mid-1870s, resulting in a significant number of high-quality Second Empire and Italianate houses in the area, which were followed by a wave of Queen Anne style buildings. Notable public architecture includes the Knox County Courthouse, and the Rockland Public Library.

== See also ==
- National Register of Historic Places listings in Knox County, Maine
