= Third County Courthouse =

Third County Courthouse may refer to any of numerous courthouses that were third-built in their county, including:

- Old Marengo County Courthouse, Linden, Alabama
- Christian County Courthouse (Illinois), Taylorville, Illinois
- Third St. Joseph County Courthouse, South Bend, Indiana
- Third Sarpy County Courthouse, Papillon, Nebraska
- Third County Courthouse (Staten Island), New York City, New York
- Clark County Courthouse (Ohio), Springfield, Ohio

== See also ==
- Old Third District Courthouse, New Bedford, Massachusetts
- Jefferson Market Library, was Third Judicial District Courthouse, New York City, New York
- Second County Courthouse (disambiguation)
- Fourth County Courthouse (disambiguation)
