= Second County Courthouse =

Second County Courthouse may refer to any of numerous courthouses which were second-built in their counties, including:

- Second St. Joseph County Courthouse, South Bend, Indiana
- Second Arenac County Courthouse, Omer, Michigan
- Second Tompkins County Courthouse, Ithaca, New York

== See also ==
- Tallahatchie County Second District Courthouse, Sumner, Mississippi
- Third County Courthouse (disambiguation)
- Fourth County Courthouse (disambiguation)
