= Vermilion County Courthouse (Illinois) =

Coordinates: 40°07′29″N 87°37′47″W

The Rita B. Garman Vermilion County Courthouse is the courthouse of Vermilion County, Illinois. Its court sessions hear cases in the 5th circuit of Illinois judicial district 5. The county courthouse is located at 7 North Vermilion St. in the county seat of Danville.

== History ==
Vermilion County has had four courthouses. They were built in 1827 (a log cabin), 1832–1833 (wood and brick), 1876–1877 (brick), and the fourth or current courthouse. The Neoclassical structure used today by Vermilion County was built in 1910–1913 at a cost of $281,455. The county and its taxpayers carried out a complete structural rehabilitation of the Courthouse in 1986–1989 ($4,685,000).

On the same street, within walking distance, is the Joseph G. Cannon County Administration Building on 201 North Vermilion Street. Built in 1909–1911, the county administration building was originally built as a post office and courthouse for the U.S. federal government. After the federal government retroceded the structure to Vermilion County, the county adaptively re-used the structure to house many of its executive office functions. The courthouse and the county administration building are both faced with Bedford limestone quarried in nearby Indiana.

The courthouse was recently renamed to honor Rita B. Garman, longtime justice on the Illinois Supreme Court. Garman, who commenced her legal career in Danville, became the first woman from Downstate Illinois to serve as Chief Justice of the state's highest court.
