= Jasper County Courthouse (Illinois) =

Local government building in the United States

Coordinates: 38°59′25″N 88°9′43″W

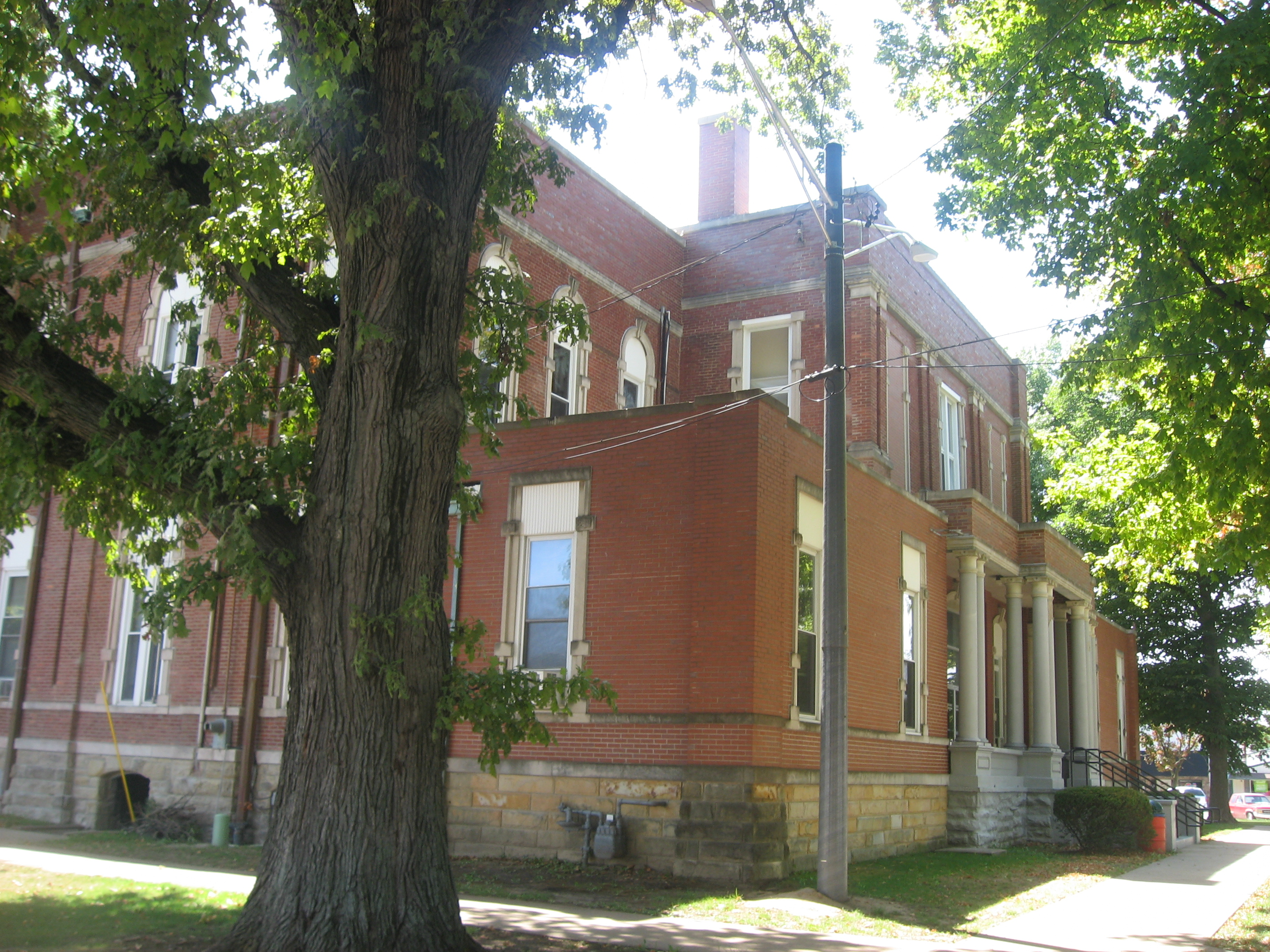
Facade seen from one side

The Jasper County Courthouse is a government building in Newton, the county seat of Jasper County, Illinois, United States. Built in 1876, it is the third courthouse in the county's history.

In 1831, the General Assembly divided Crawford County into three counties, due to its inconveniently large size, and the central portion was named "Jasper County". No suitable community existing in the new county's boundaries, the law creating the county also appointed a three-man commission to choose a location for a new county seat, which was to be named "Newton". The location chosen was donated by an early settler, Louis W. Jordan, who rightly suspected that donating some of his land to the county would increase the value of the rest of his land. Although the county initially existed on paper only, it was completely organized at the beginning of 1835. Louis Jordan's house served as the location of some early government meetings until the county built its first courthouse, a rude log building; it also served as a church building and schoolhouse, and although the county later sold it, the old courthouse lasted at least into the 1880s.

Jasper County's first permanent courthouse was a two-story brick building, measuring 40 feet (12 m) on the long sides and 32 feet (9.8 m) on the short. Like its predecessor, the second courthouse was periodically used for religious worship, with a Baptist preacher being particularly remembered for his activities there. Although it was accepted by the county government in late 1841, poor finances prevented the building's completion, and over the next 35 years, the county was constantly paying for repairs — some of which required donations by civic-minded residents.

In 1876, the county government finally gave up on the old building and appointed a committee to examine courthouses in nearby counties for use as models. The newly built Richland County Courthouse was chosen, and after ornamental elements were removed from the design, a contract for $34,000 was issued. At completion, the building possessed a dome, but its structural integrity was compromised while it was being repaired to stop leaks, and it was nearly carried off by an 1880 windstorm. Since that time, the Neoclassical dome and the central tower on which it sat have been removed, as have been the pediment above the main entrance and the hip roof with its chimneys. Otherwise, the building retains much of its original structure: a two-story brick building, cruciform in shape, built on a stone foundation, and entered by climbing steps to a portico-sheltered main entrance.
