= Robinson-Stewart House =

Historic house in Illinois, United States

- U.S. National Register of Historic Places
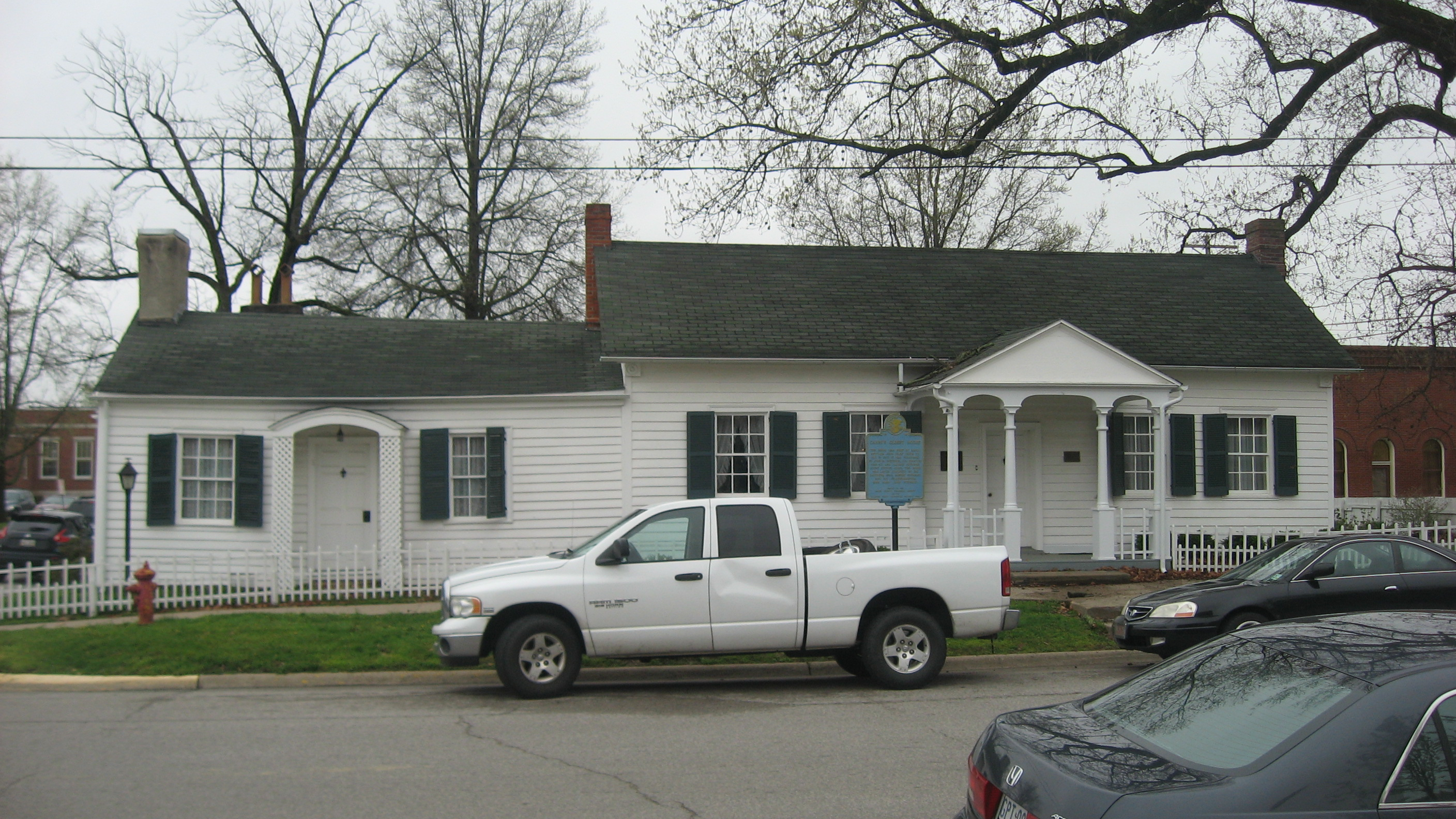

- Location within Illinois Location within the United States
- Interactive map showing the location of Robinson-Stewart House
- Location: 110 S. Main Cross St., Carmi, Illinois
- Coordinates: 38°5′25″N 88°9′31″W
- Area: 0.4 acres (0.16 ha)
- Built: 1814
- Built by: Craw, John
- NRHP reference No.: 73000720
- Added to NRHP: August 17, 1973

The Robinson-Stewart House is a historic house located at 110 S. Main Cross St. in Carmi, Illinois. Built in 1814 by John Craw, the house is the oldest in Carmi and one of the oldest in Illinois. Carmi was founded in an 1816 meeting at the house; the community's early settlers met there to choose the community's name, a reference to a biblical figure, and voted to plat its land. The house also served as White County's courthouse until 1828, when a separate courthouse building was constructed. In 1835, U.S. Senator John McCracken Robinson purchased the house; Robinson lived in the home until his death in 1843.

The house was added to the National Register of Historic Places on August 17, 1973.
