= Livingston County Law and Justice Center =

Local government building in the United States

Coordinates: 40°52′45″N 88°37′42″W

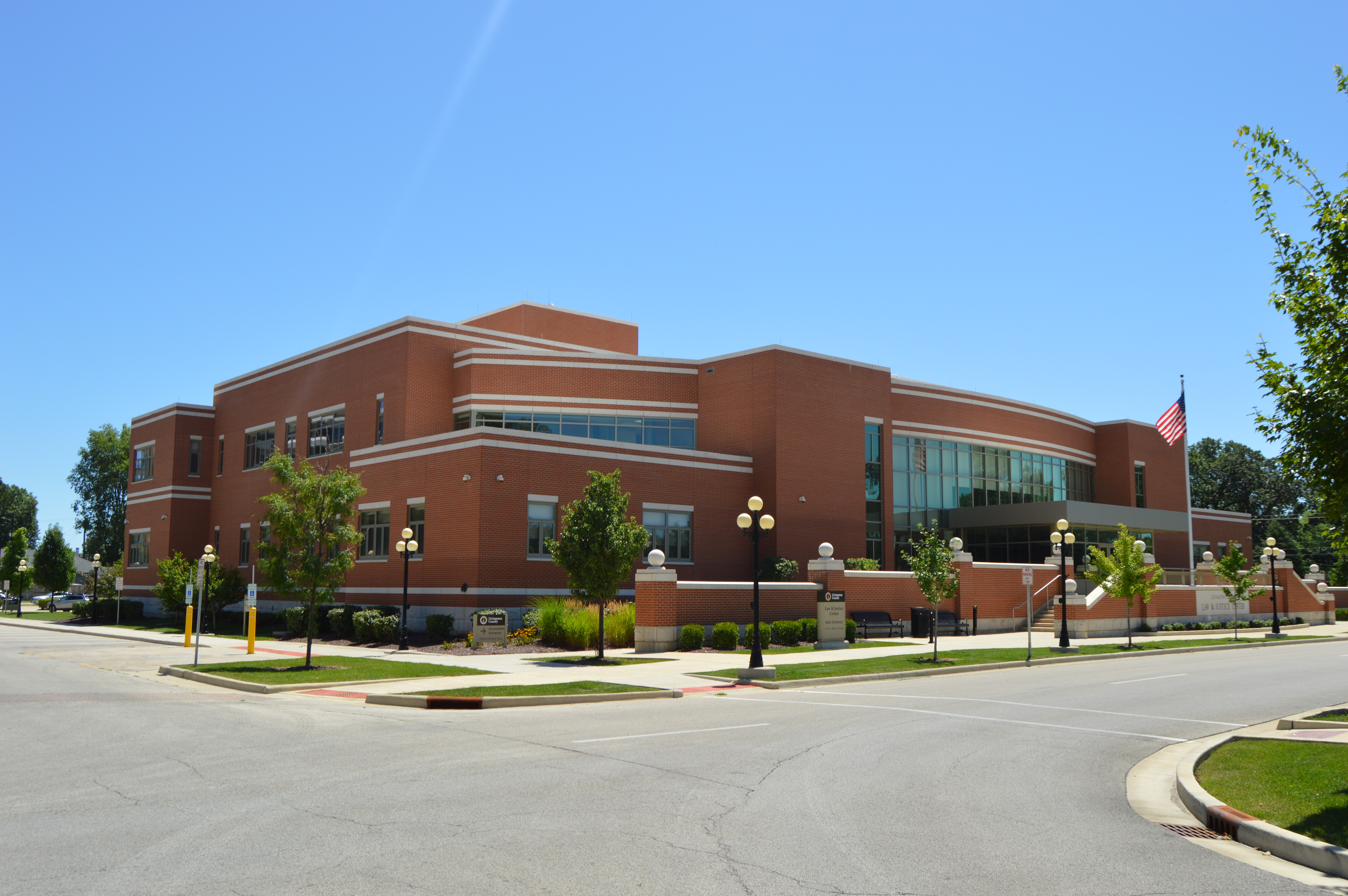
Livingston County Law and Justice Center

The Livingston County Law and Justice Center is a judicial facility in the U.S. state of Illinois. Constructed in 2009–2011, it is located at 110 N. Main Street in Pontiac, Illinois, separately from Livingston County's historic 19-century courthouse. It holds court sessions on cases brought to it within its 11th Circuit jurisdiction, and contains space for the county jail.
