= Macoupin County Courthouse =

Local government building in the United States

Coordinates: 39°16′45″N 89°52′46″W

The Macoupin County Courthouse, located at 201 East Main Street in Carlinville, Illinois, is the county courthouse serving Macoupin County, Illinois. Built in 1867-1870, it is a building of eclectic Classical Revival architecture. The cost of construction was $1,542,308.

== Description ==
The Macoupin County Courthouse holds court sessions on cases brought to it within its 7th Circuit jurisdiction. It is also the meeting place of the elected county board, and contains offices for the county. The 1870 Macoupin County Courthouse is the third building to serve this purpose.
