= Massac County Courthouse =

Local government building in the United States

Coordinates: 37°09′08″N 88°43′58″W

The Massac County Courthouse, located at 1 Superman Square on Market Street in Metropolis, Illinois, is the county courthouse serving Massac County, Illinois. Built in 1940–1941, it is a building of Public Works Administration architecture. The courthouse square is decorated with a statue of Superman, the fictional resident of Metropolis.

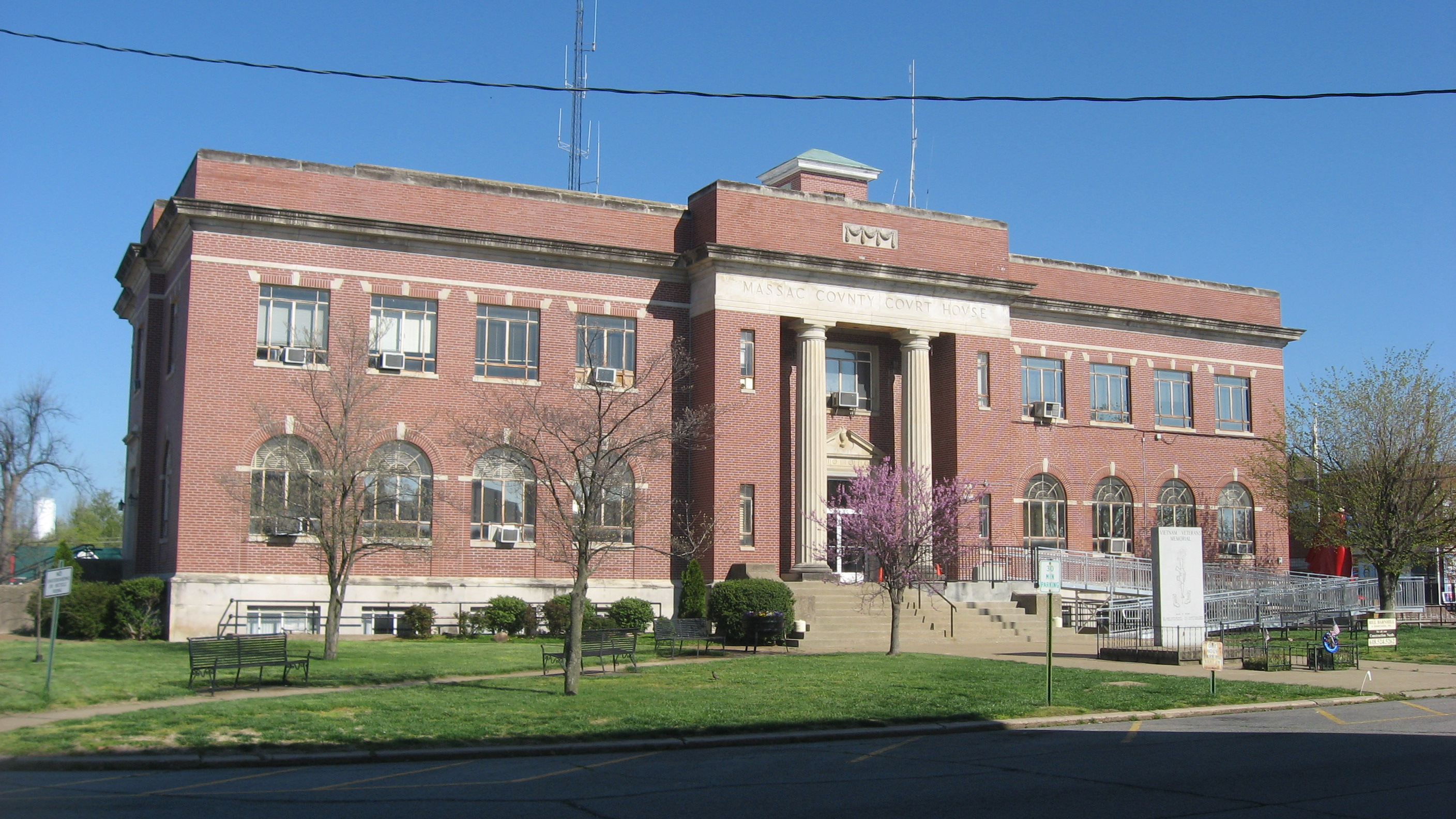
Massac County Courthouse

== Description ==
The Stark County Courthouse holds court sessions on cases brought to it within its 1st Circuit jurisdiction. It is also the meeting place of the elected county commissioners, and contains offices for the county. The 1940-1941 Massac County Courthouse is the third building to serve this purpose. The first courthouse was built in 1843-1847, and was replaced by the second courthouse in 1862.
