= Livingston County Courthouse (Illinois) =

Local government building in Illinois, United States

Coordinates: 40°52′47.6″N 88°37′45.2″W

- U.S. National Register of Historic Places
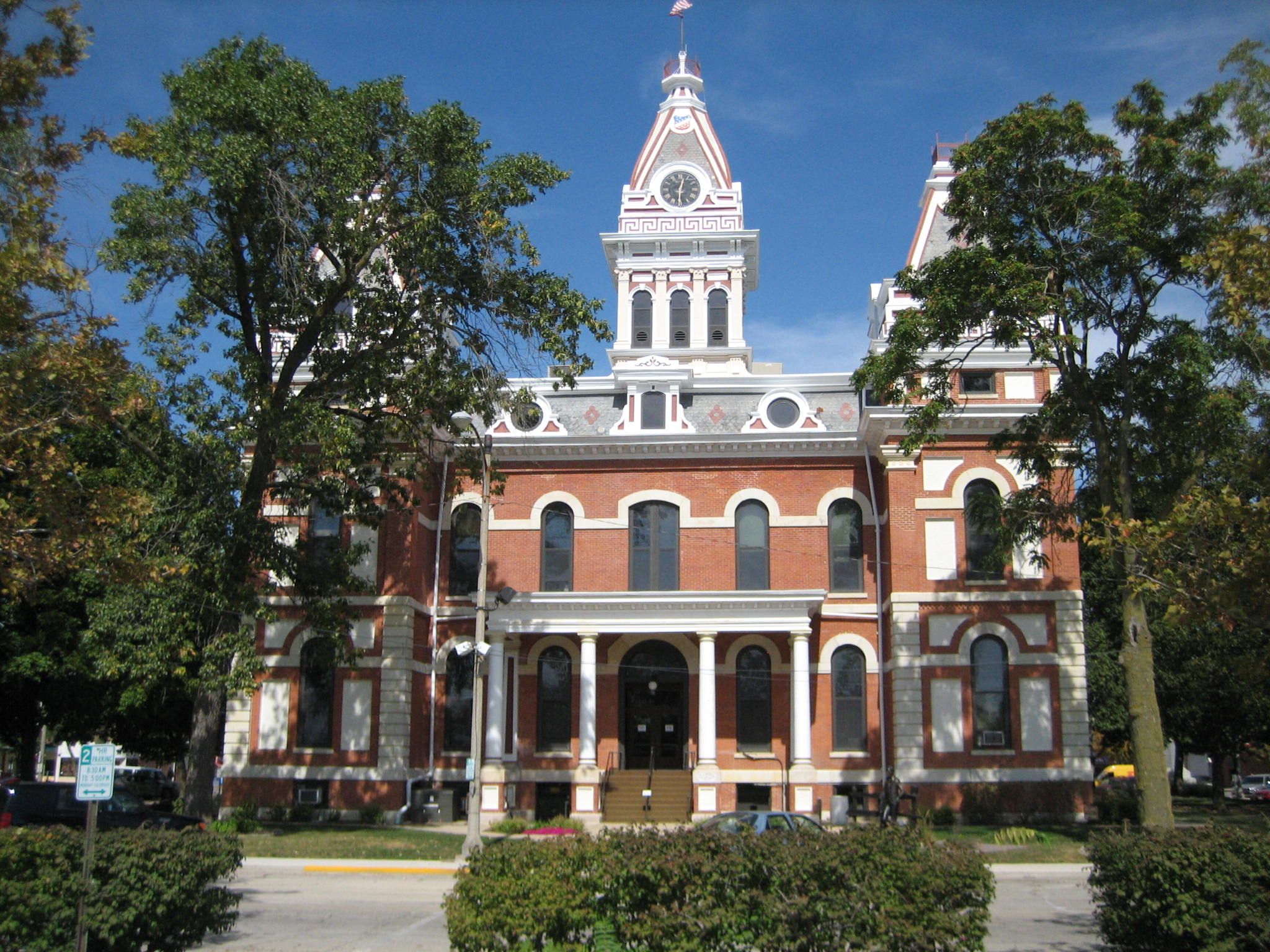

- Location within Illinois Location within the United States
- Interactive map showing the location of Livingston County Courthouse
- Location: Pontiac, Illinois, United States
- Built: 1874-1875
- Architect: J.C. Cochrane
- Architectural style: Second Empire
- NRHP reference No.: 86003165
- Added to NRHP: November 19, 1986

The Livingston County Courthouse, located at 110 North Main Street in Pontiac, Illinois, is the historic county courthouse serving Livingston County, Illinois. It is the meeting place of the elected county board, and contains offices for the county. Despite its name, it is no longer the county's working courthouse; in 2011 the county's judicial functions moved to a nearby new building complex, the Livingston County Law and Justice Center.

== History ==
The current Livingston County Courthouse is the third building to carry that name. Construction on the present-day courthouse began in late 1874 and was completed late the next year. The courthouse was built after fire consumed the second Livingston County Courthouse on July 4, 1874. The plan for the courthouse was selected from a slate of ten candidate plans. The County Board of Supervisors noted at the time that the selected plan "cost more money (but) it was the only one which for size, fire-proof qualities, and solidity would answer the purpose, and was indeed, in the matter of taste and elegance, much in advance of any other." However, the author of the 1915 The County Archives of the State of Illinois called the building "hardly fireproof". The courthouse clock tower was installed in 1892. The Courthouse served as the county's primary judicial center until 2011, when the Law and Justice Center opened across the street. The historic Courthouse currently houses county offices that are not court-related.

== Architecture ==
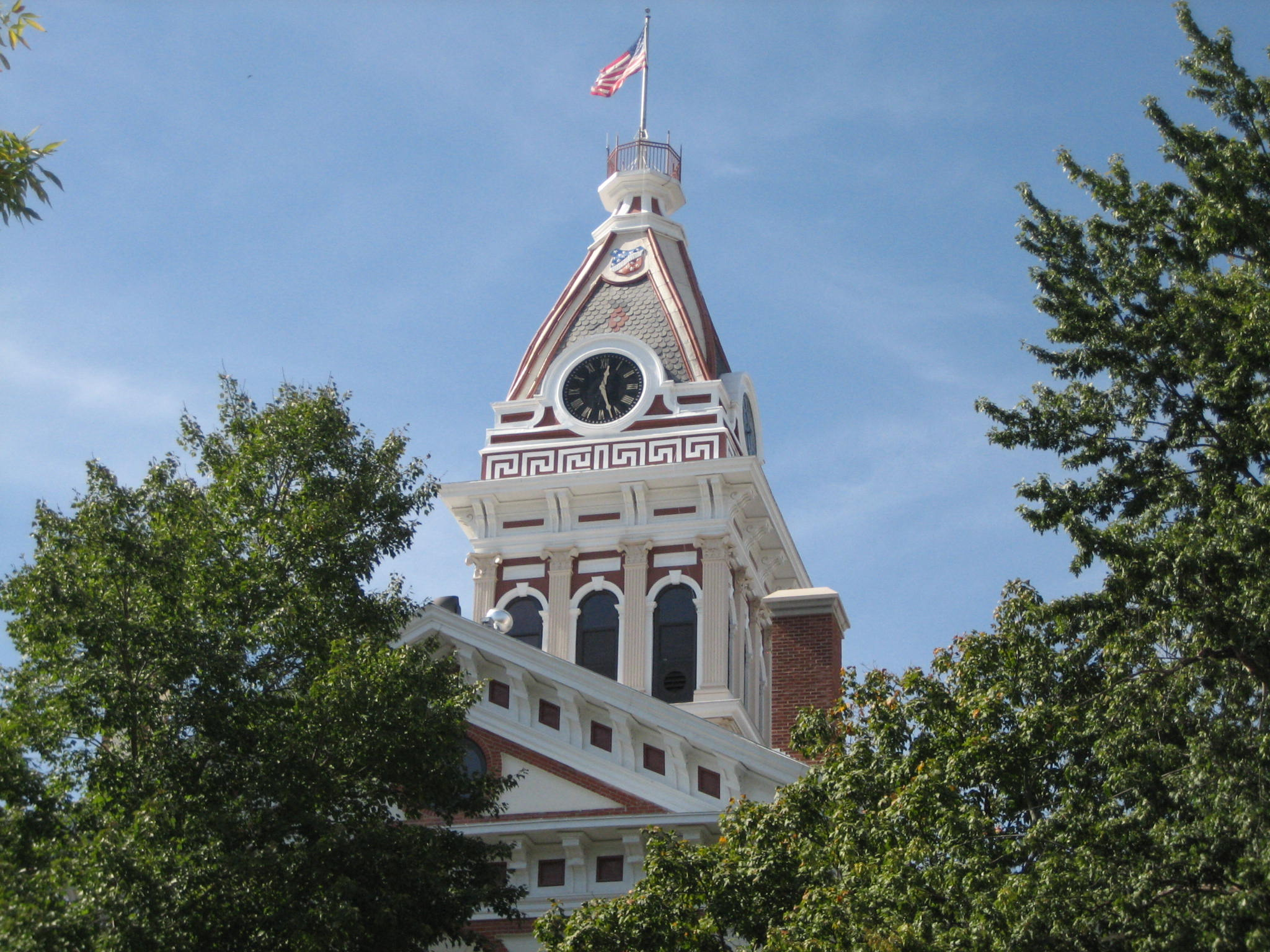
The clock tower was added in 1892

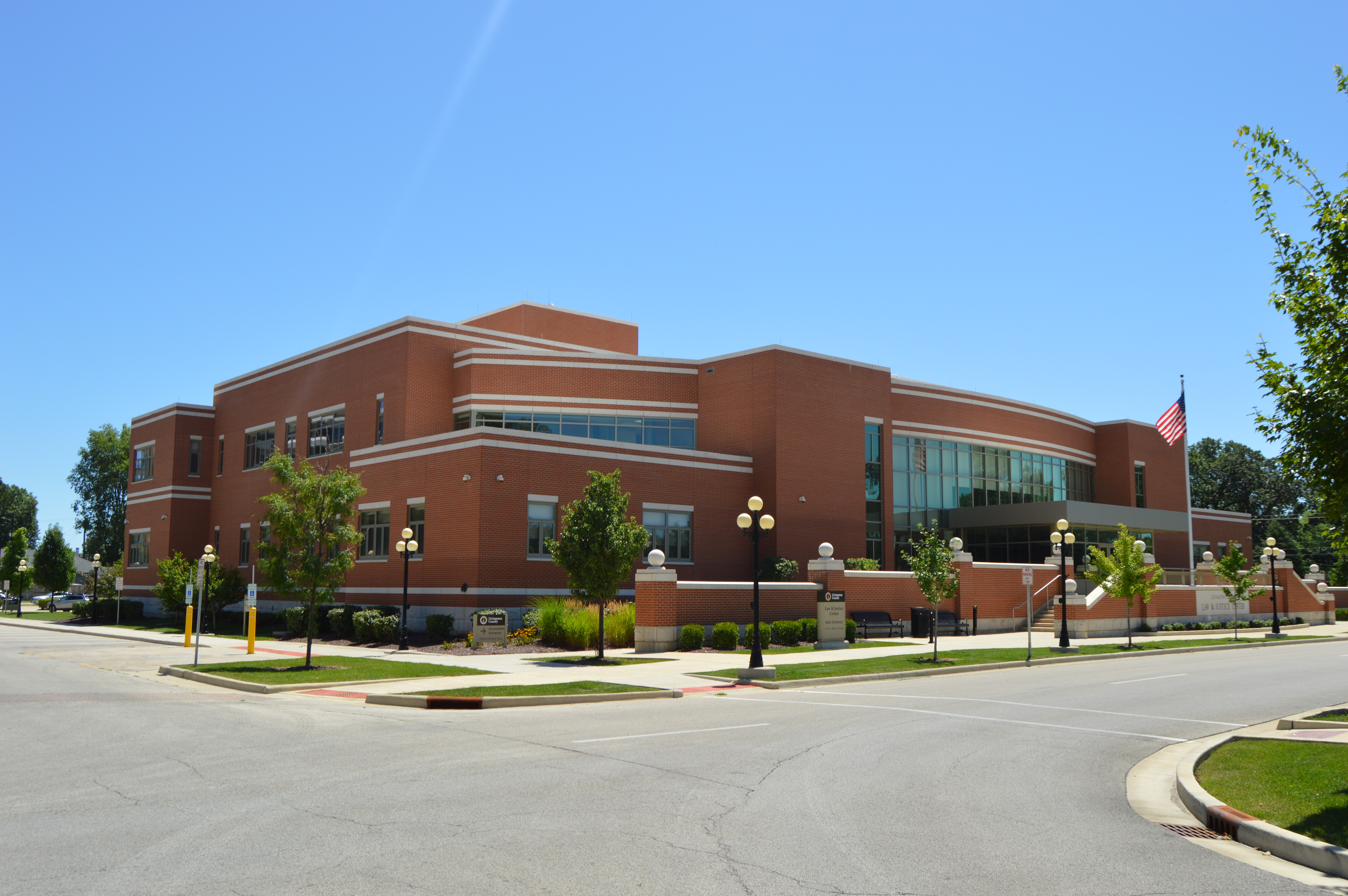
Replacement courthouse, opened in 2011

John C. Cochrane, a Chicago architect designed the Livingston County Courthouse in Second Empire style. The building is symmetrical and rectangular, standing two stories tall. Each of its four corners features a tower and there is also a central clock tower topping the building. Some architectural elements found on the structure include: quoins, cornices, a mansard roof, modillions, belt courses and patterned roof tiles. From the basement to the eaves the building stands 55 feet tall and the clock tower sits at 70 feet above the basement.

== Historic significance ==
The Livingston County Courthouse was added to the National Register of Historic Places on November 19, 1986. It was added because it met criteria for inclusion in the areas of politics and government as well as architecture. The building was the seat of judicial activity in Livingston County, Illinois from 1875 until the 21st century, and it is a locally excellent example of Second Empire style.
