= DuPage County Government Center =

Coordinates: 41.8685°N 88.1388°W

The DuPage County Government Center, a courthouse, is the focus of the 18th judicial circuit of the state of Illinois. The circuit is conterminous with DuPage County, Illinois. The courthouse is located at 505 North County Farm Road in the county seat of Wheaton.
