= Soldiers' Monument (Freeport, Illinois) =

- U.S. National Register of Historic Places
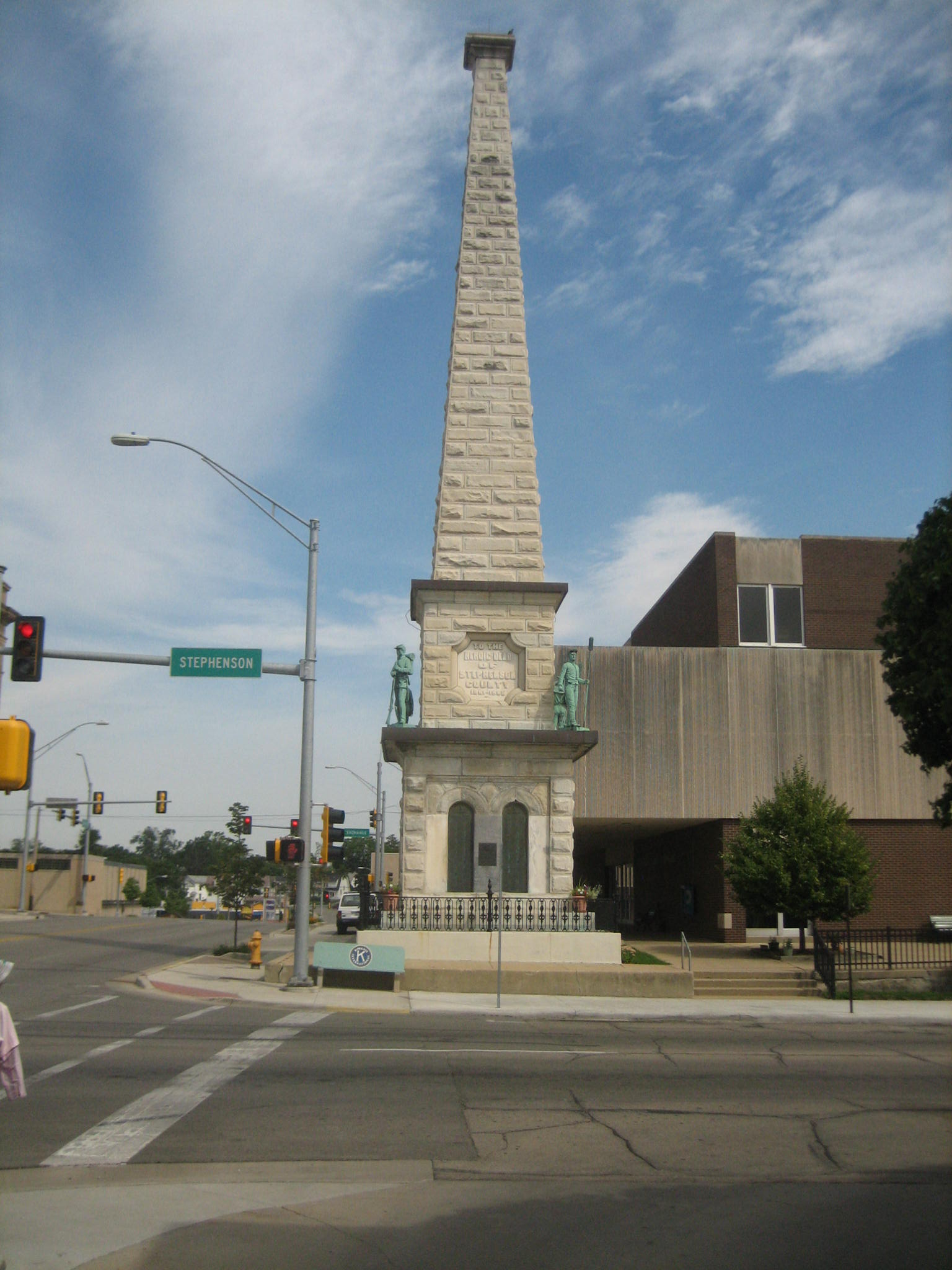

- Location within Illinois Location within the United States
- Location: 15 N. Galena Ave., Freeport, Illinois
- Coordinates: 42°17′52″N 89°37′19″W
- Area: less than one acre
- Built: 1871
- Architect: Atkins, Gen. Smith D.
- NRHP reference No.: 98000461
- Added to NRHP: June 1, 1998

The Soldiers' Monument is an American Civil War memorial located at the northern corner of Galena Avenue and Stephenson Street in Freeport, Illinois.

General Smith D. Atkins designed the monument, which was erected in 1871. The limestone obelisk monument is 83 feet (25 m) tall; a statue of Victory originally topped the monument, but it was destroyed by a lightning strike in 1960. Marble tablets at the base of the memorial listed the names of Stephenson County's Civil War casualties; these were reversed and covered by bronze plaques in 1924 to allow space to list all of the county's Civil War veterans. Four 7-foot (2.1 m) statues were located at the corners of the base, which were replaced by identical replicas in 1924. The statues represent soldiers from each major branch of the Union military: the Infantry, Cavalry, Artillery, and Navy.

The monument was added to the National Register of Historic Places on June 1, 1998.

== Replacement of the Victory statue ==
After several years of fundraising by the Civil War Monument Fund, over $120,000 was raised to replace the destroyed victory statue. The efforts of the group and many local donors culminated in the repair of the monument and the replacement of the statue on December 4, 2015. Vincent Tolpo, a local artist, was contracted to recreate the Victory statue.
