= Logan County Courthouse (Illinois) =

Local government building in the United States

Coordinates: 40°08′46″N 89°21′45″W

The Logan County Courthouse, located at 601 Broadway Street in Lincoln, Illinois, is the county courthouse serving Logan County, Illinois. Built in 1903-1904, it is a domed building of Classical Revival architecture built of reinforced concrete faced with limestone. It is the fifth courthouse to serve Logan County. The Logan County Courthouse holds court sessions on cases brought to it within its 11th Circuit jurisdiction. It is also the meeting place of the elected county board, and contains offices for the county.

== History ==
Three buildings that served, or serve, as Logan County courthouse survive in various locations; two of them, used in 1840-1853, have courtrooms where Abraham Lincoln actively practiced law and argued cases. The roll of Logan County courthouse buildings, with their dates of active service and ultimate fates, include:

- First courthouse, used in 1840-1847 in Postville, Illinois. Surviving Abraham Lincoln courthouse. Was superseded in 1847 when the county seat moved to Mount Pulaski, Illinois. No longer in use as a courthouse, this building was later purchased by carmaker Henry Ford, dismantled, and moved to Greenfield Village for reconstruction in Dearborn, Michigan. Meanwhile the frontier community of Postville had been annexed by the new county seat of Lincoln, Illinois. A replica of the Postville courthouse was built at 914 South Fifth Street, Lincoln, on or close to the original foundation. This replica is currently owned by the state of Illinois as the Postville Courthouse State Historic Site.
- Second courthouse, used in 1848-1853 in Mount Pulaski. Surviving Abraham Lincoln courthouse. Was superseded in 1853 when the county seat moved back to Lincoln, Illinois. This original courthouse is currently owned by the state of Illinois as the Mount Pulaski Courthouse State Historic Site.
- Third courthouse, used in 1853-1857 in Lincoln. Burned on April 15, 1857, leading to the destruction of most of the legal papers filed or worked on in Logan County by Abraham Lincoln.
- Fourth courthouse, used in 1857-1904 in Lincoln. Was replaced by the current courthouse in 1904.
- Fifth courthouse, used from 1904 and continuing in use.
