= Metamora Courthouse State Historic Site =

- Metamora Courthouse
- U.S. National Register of Historic Places
- Illinois State Historic Site
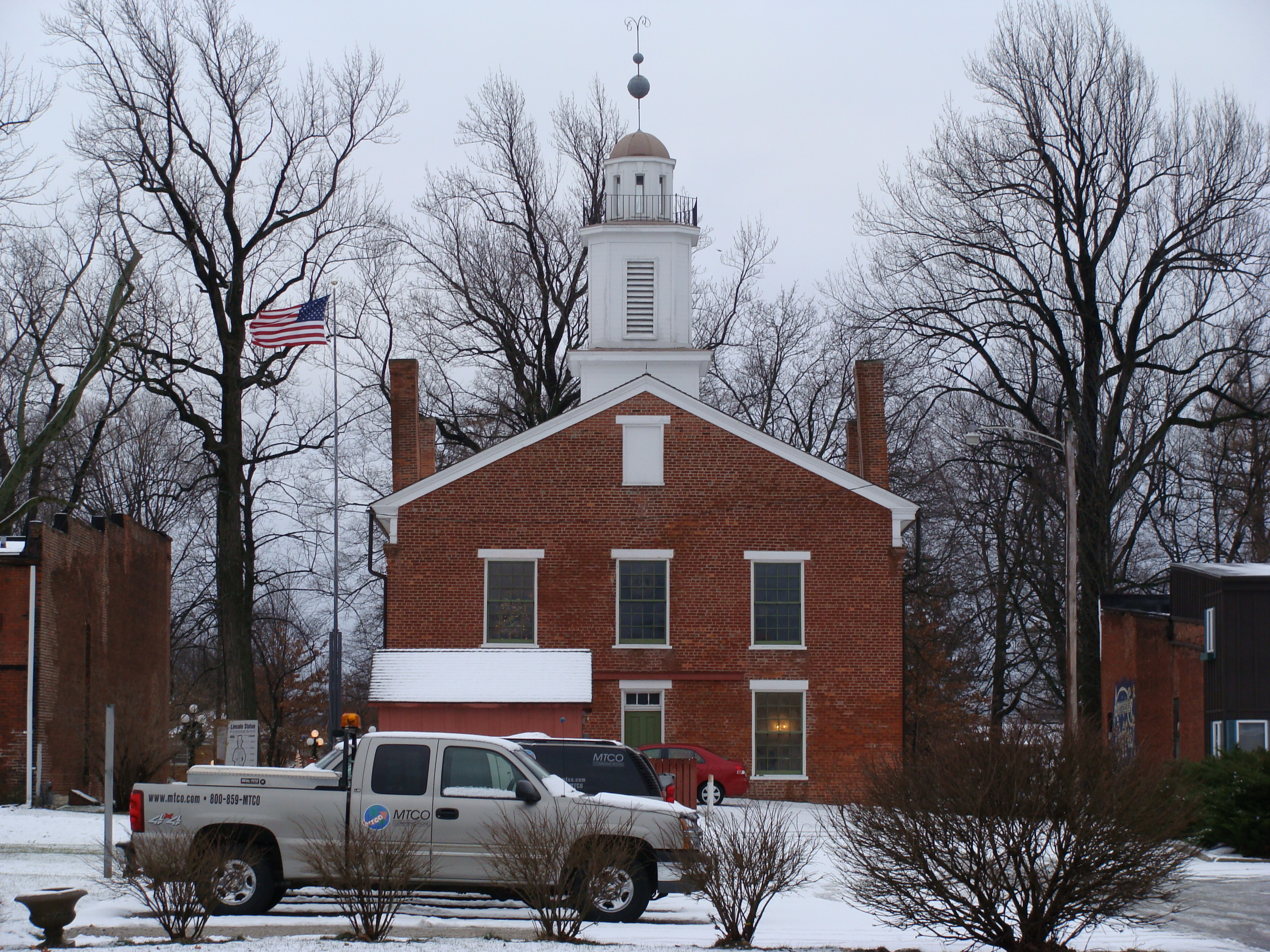
- Back of Metamora Courthouse in winter

- Location within Illinois Location within the United States
- Interactive map showing the location of Metamora Courthouse
- Coordinates: 40°47′30.4″N 89°21′44.68″W
- Built: 1845
- Architect: Irving, David
- Architectural style: Greek Revival
- NRHP reference No.: 78001203
- Added to NRHP: March 30, 1978

The Metamora Courthouse State Historic Site is a historic American courthouse located in Metamora, Illinois, the former county seat of Woodford County. The courthouse was built in 1845 as the governmental center for Woodford County and as a circuit court for the former Illinois Eighth Circuit. The courthouse is best known for being one of only two surviving Illinois circuit courthouses where future U.S. President Abraham Lincoln practiced law.

== Abraham Lincoln ==
Surviving records from Eighth Circuit courthouses such as Metamora show that Lincoln and his colleagues practiced general, unspecialized law. They served as criminal defense counsel, handled divorce and family-law cases, oversaw the passage of estates through probate, and were available to handle a wide variety of civil suits and disputes. Lincoln handled more than 70 cases here, including two murders and two cases of fugitives from slavery.

Lincoln's law firm, Lincoln & Herndon, in which he practiced with his partner William Herndon, consisted of only two lawyers. It was based in Springfield, Illinois, and Lincoln was the circuit partner, traveling from county seat to county seat throughout the Eighth Circuit when the circuit court was in session. Researchers have found more than 70 Woodfood County circuit court cases handled by Mr. Lincoln from 1845 through 1858.

In these travels, Lincoln made friends all over central Illinois. These ties served him well in 1858 when he ran for the U.S. Senate against incumbent Stephen A. Douglas. Although Lincoln lost this race, his oratory led to his gaining national attention and the nomination in 1860 as the candidate for president of the U.S. Republican Party.

Lincoln's speechmaking skills served him well as candidate and as president. These skills were honed as a trial lawyer in circuit courtrooms like this one.

== After Lincoln ==
After Lincoln's election to the presidency in 1860, the Metamora courthouse continued its service until Woodford County voters moved the county seat from Metamora to Eureka, Illinois in 1896, building a new courthouse there. The historic former courthouse served as a community center from 1896 until 1921; plays and movies were shown here, and community organizations used the hall as a meeting place. Starting in 1921, the former courthouse was restored as a local museum and memorial to the profession of law in early Illinois. The building was added to the National Register of Historic Places in 1978. It is operated by the Illinois Historic Preservation Agency.

The Metamora Courthouse has two floors, with the first floor serving as a museum of local history and Illinois frontier law, and the second floor restored to its 1850s appearance as the county courtroom and adjacent judicial chambers.

The Courthouse is one of only two Illinois circuit courthouses in which Lincoln practiced law that are standing on their original foundations. The other is the Mount Pulaski Courthouse State Historic Site.
