= Iroquois County Courthouse =

Coordinates: 40°46′18″N 87°43′8″W

The Iroquois County Courthouse is the courthouse of Iroquois County, Illinois. Its court sessions hear cases in the 21st circuit of Illinois judicial district 3. The county courthouse is located at 550 South Tenth St. in the county seat of Watseka. The administration of the county, including the County Board, is located in the Iroquois County Administrative Center, a separate building at 1001 East Grant St., Watseka.

== History ==
The Iroquois County courthouse is a Modern Architecture structure built in 1965-1966 of concrete and glass. The architectural firm was Graham, Anderson, Probst & White of Chicago. The Old Iroquois County Courthouse, a Second Empire structure built in 1866 after the county seat was moved to Watseka in 1865, survives with additions built in 1881 and 1927. No longer used for courthouse purposes, it is now the Iroquois County Museum. Prior county courthouse buildings in the former county seat villages of Montgomery, Illinois and Middleport, Illinois, do not survive; and their home villages are now ghost towns.
