= Piatt County Courthouse (Illinois) =

Coordinates: 40°01′31″N 88°34′21″W

The Piatt County Courthouse is the governmental center and courthouse of Piatt County, Illinois. Its court sessions hear cases in the 6th circuit of Illinois judicial district 5. The courthouse also serves as the seat of Piatt County government. The county courthouse is located at 101 West Washington Street in the county seat of Monticello.

== History ==
The current courthouse, the third to be used by Piatt County, was built in 1903–1904 in a stripped-down Classical Revival style, at a cost of $75,000. A major renovation was completed in 1996. The architect, Joseph W. Royer of Urbana, Illinois, also designed eight other Illinois county courthouses. Earlier Piatt County courthouses were built in 1843-1845 (first courthouse) and in 1856-1857 (second courthouse). Illinois lawyer Abraham Lincoln pleaded several cases in the 1843-1845 frame courthouse, which does not survive.
