= Edwards County Courthouse (Illinois) =

Coordinates: 38°22′40″N 88°3′26″W

The Edwards County Courthouse is the courthouse of Edwards County, Illinois. Its court sessions hear cases in the 2nd circuit of Illinois judicial district 5. The county courthouse is located at 50 East Main St. in the county seat of Albion. The courthouse is also the seat of Edwards County government operations.

== History ==
Edwards County was established by the laws of Illinois Territory in 1814, during the successful completion of hostile actions against the Indians in the War of 1812. The earliest Euro-American settlers chose a location they called Palmyra, now a ghost town, to be their county seat.

In 1824, the county voters moved the county seat from Palmyra to Albion. The first courthouse was built in Albion in 1825 for $3,000 in the gold money of the day. This sum paid for construction bricks; the bricks have since been repurposed as part of the structure of the Albion-based Edwards County Historical Society.

In 1852, the county chose to build a new courthouse, this time costing $3.600 in gold money. Despite its added cost value, the second Albion courthouse drew a growing list of local enemies. In April 1887, a local grand jury posted a notice of condemnation of the 1852 building, something that grand juries were allowed to do in those days. The condemnation was controversial, as many local taxpayers did not want to pay taxes to construct a new building. Furthermore, the nearby town of Browns, Illinois was putting in a bid for the county seat.

A solution to this dilemma appeared when a Louisville, Kentucky building firm promised to “repair” the old courthouse. The “repairs” turned into the demolition of the entire 1852 structure, except for a token section of a portion of one brick wall. An entirely new Second Empire courthouse structure rose in its place (at taxpayers' expense) in 1887–1888. The new courthouse was crowned with a Victorian bell tower and super-sized grandfather clock, still in operation as of 2025, for which the timekeeping works, weights, and bell to strike the hours weighs 1.5 tons.

The Victorian structure was expanded in 1940, and again in 1996–1997. The county's courtroom, and much of its administrative office space, are now located in the new sections of the building. The 1996-1997 addition was raised, and its interior fitted, in an undistinguished Modernist style.
