= Lake County Courthouse (Illinois) =

Coordinates: 42°21′38″N 87°49′59″W

The Lake County Courthouse and Administration Building is the governmental center and courthouse complex of Lake County, Illinois. Its court sessions hear cases in the 19th circuit of the Illinois judicial district 2; the 19th circuit is coterminous with the county. The county courthouse is located at 301 Washington Street, and the county building is located at 18 North County Street, adjacent to each other in the county seat of Waukegan. The complex also contains a Justice Center (25 South M.L. King Jr. Avenue), which operates as correctional space convenient to the courthouse.

== Building complex ==
The current courthouse, the sixth to be used by Lake County, was built in 2015-2018 to replace former courthouse space. It is a building of Modern architecture with stone-and-glass facing. The architect was Bane Gaiser and AECOM of Los Angeles.

The current county building was originally built in 1968-1970. Originally built as the fifth county courthouse and as the county jail, it is a building of modern architecture with Brutalist aspects. After the correctional space moved to the Robert H. Babcox Justice Center (built in 1986-1989), the former jail space could be renovated for use as a new county building, a process completed in 1996. This transition continued with the construction, starting in 2015, of the sixth courthouse. A skywalk connects the county building with the adjacent courthouse.

== History ==
After the organization of Lake County, Illinois in 1839, temporary courthouse occupancies took place in Libertyville, and then in Little Fort, Illinois. As Little Fort grew into the thriving port of Waukegan on Lake Michigan, the county decided to keep the courthouse there. The third headquarters for the county government, and the first building built and dedicated as a county courthouse, rose in Waukegan in 1843-1845 at a cost of $3,800. This third courthouse, apparently built of wood, burned in 1875.

A fourth courthouse was built, again in Waukegan, in 1878, this time at a cost of $40,000. It was significantly enlarged in 1923, but proved far too small for the population and governmental growth of the post-World War II era. The fourth courthouse was demolished in the 1960s, and the fifth courthouse (after 2018, the County Building) was built in 1969-1970. It, too, proved too small. The sixth courthouse, the one in present use as of 2025, cost $110.0 million to construct in 2015-2018.
