= Woodford County Courthouse (Illinois) =

Coordinates: 40°43′19″N 89°16′20″W

The Woodford County Courthouse is the governmental center and courthouse of Woodford County, Illinois. Its court sessions hear cases in the 11th circuit of Illinois judicial district 4. The county courthouse is located at 117 East Court St. in the county seat of Eureks.

== History ==
Woodford County was carved out from other jurisdictions in 1843, and the new county selected a settlement called Versailles (not to be confused with Versailles, Illinois) as the initial county seat. In 1843 the county seat moved to Metamora, and in 1845-1846 the county constructed the brick Greek Revival courthouse used until 1894. The "Old Courthouse" was repeatedly used by Abraham Lincoln as a circuit lawyer of Central Illinois. The Lincoln-era courthouse has been preserved as a historic site, the Metamora Courthouse State Historic Site. It is no longer used as a courthouse.

In 1894, the county electorate voted to move the county seat to Eureka, a town that was located on the Toledo, Peoria & Western Railroad. For its new home, in 1897-1898 the county taxpayers built the Classical Revival courthouse in use today. The cost of the replacement courthouse was $90,232. In a major addition in 1999-2001, the county built a Public Safety Facility attached to the north side of the classical structure. The additional footage houses correctional bed space and operational capabilities for the Woodford County Sheriff.
