= St. Clair County Courthouse (Illinois) =

Local government building in the United States

Coordinates: 38°30′47″N 89°59′7″W

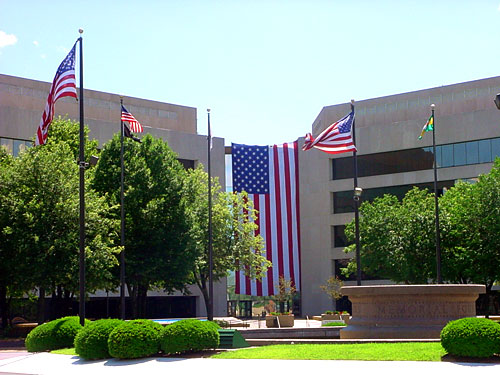
Plaza entrance to the courthouse

The St. Clair County Courthouse is a government building in Belleville, the county seat of St. Clair County, Illinois, United States. Built in 1976, it is the fifth courthouse in the history of the county, and one of two that still stands.

== Early history ==
Frenchmen settled in the Mississippi River basin at the end of the seventeenth century, founding towns such as Kaskaskia and Cahokia with missions to local Native Americans. Following the Seven Years' War, the region came under British control, with local government based at Fort de Chartres. This period ended during the American Revolution, as George Rogers Clark led Virginia troops to conquer the whole region north of the Ohio River. Illinois County was created in 1779 to administer the region. Virginia ceded its control of the region to the Confederation government in 1784, which formed it into the Northwest Territory in 1787.

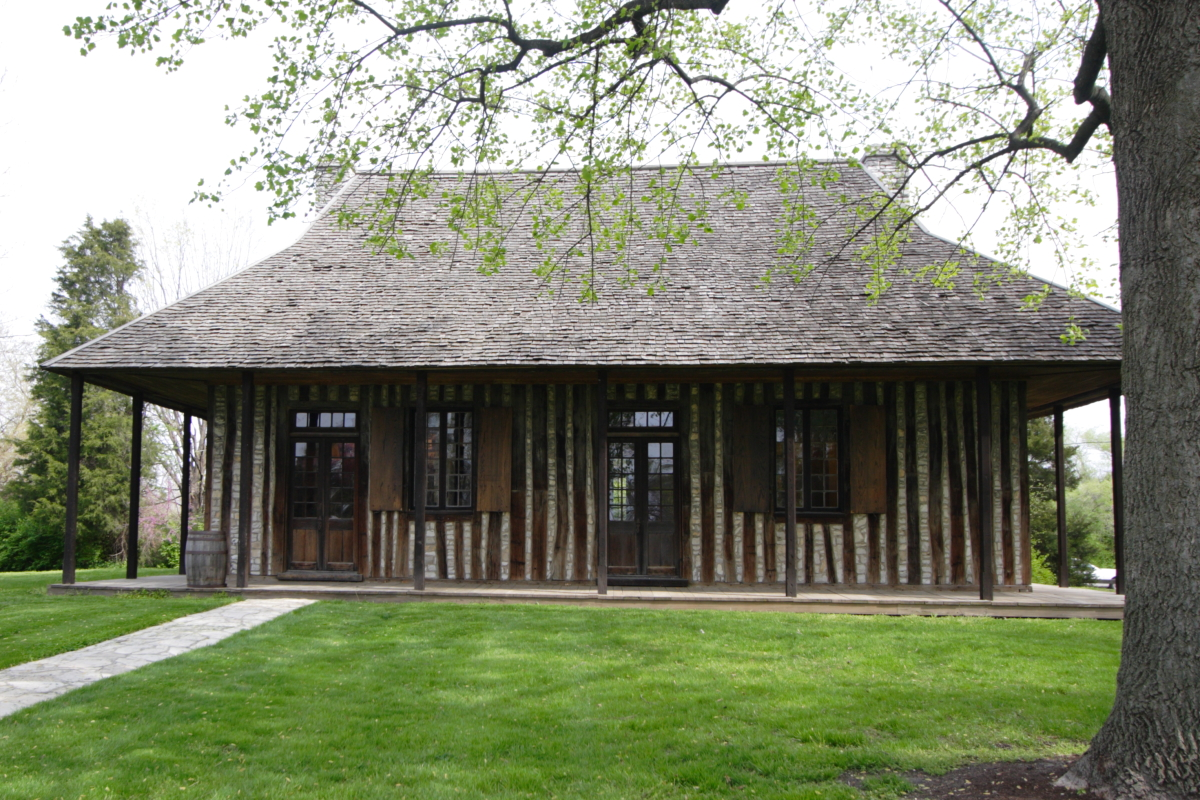
Old Cahokia Courthouse

American settlement in the territory began at Marietta in 1787, and as the population expanded, Governor Arthur St. Clair decided to establish counties in the territory in 1790. St. Clair County, named by the governor for himself, was the first county in what has since become Illinois; its original boundaries were everything east of the Illinois River, south of the Mackinaw River, west of Fort Massac, and north of the Ohio and Mississippi rivers. In 1793, county officials purchased a private house at Cahokia and converted it into a courthouse. This building, now known as the Old Cahokia Courthouse, remained in use until 1814, when the seat was moved to Belleville because of Cahokia's susceptibility to river flooding.

== Previous courthouses in Belleville ==
Three previous courthouses have stood on Belleville's public square. The first was ordered in 1815 for a cost of $1,525; it was a frame building completed by Etienne Pensoneau in 1817. However, the building quickly became too small; after just ten years, the county court ordered that a replacement be built. The second courthouse was a brick building, constructed for twice the price of its predecessor; contractor William Fowler seems to have finished it in June 1831. It remained in use for thirty years.

The third Belleville courthouse was constructed from 1859 to 1861 at a cost slightly surpassing $100,000 under the inspection of Nathaniel Niles. It appears to have needed various finishing touches, as the county spent more than $4,000 in 1862 and 1863 on further construction. This building was a rectangular structure two stories high with a raised basement and a shallow-sloped hip roof. Seven windows on each side pierced the sides, and five each end, with the main entrance in the middle of one end. A grand staircase provided access from the street, and the entrance was sheltered by a pedimented porch supported by two-story Corinthian columns. In 1893, it was expanded with gable-roofed wings to the rear, and a dome was set at the center.

== Current courthouse ==
As St. Clair County's population continued to grow into the 1960s, the Civil War-era courthouse in turn became too small, and another building was needed. Despite its prominent location in the community, county officials chose to demolish the building and erect a new courthouse on the same site, and a grassroots historic preservation campaign failed to save the old courthouse. Destruction began in 1972, and the new courthouse was completed in 1976.

Today's courthouse is a modernist building of concrete and glass; the basic plan is the shape of the letter "L", five stories tall. It sits high above the surrounding street; a staircase providing access from the sidewalk is interrupted by two landings. Architects Hellmuth, Obata + Kassabaum included elements such as a pool at the center of the building and a glass-covered bridge providing access to a parking garage across one of the surrounding streets.
