= Jo Daviess County Courthouse =

Coordinates: 42°25′06″N 90°25′33″W

The Jo Daviess County Courthouse is the courthouse of Jo Daviess County, Illinois. Its court sessions hear cases in the 15th circuit of Illinois judicial district 4. The county courthouse is located at 330 North Bench St. in the county seat of Galena. The courthouse is also the seat of Jo Daviess County government operations. After the historic structure was extensively renovated, the county announced its 2025 reopening on December 19, 2025.

== History ==
The current Jo Daviess County courthouse, of which the oldest section was built in 1839–1844, has a late Georgian architecture façade of reddish brick. A series of courthouse expansions have been built to the rear of the original courthouse. These additions were constructed in 1899, 1970, and 1974−1976. The expansions extended the justice complex up a slope that is locally called “Jail Hill.” The additions are faced with light-colored limestone rather than red brick, but also extend the original courthouse’s pre-Italianate eaves. The composite structure was extensively renovated in 2024−2025.
