= White County Courthouse (Illinois) =

Courthouse in Illinois

Coordinates: 38°05′28″N 88°09′31″W

The White County Courthouse is the courthouse of White County, Illinois. Its court sessions hear cases in the 2nd circuit of Illinois judicial district 5. The county courthouse is located at 301 East Main St. in the county seat of Carmi. The courthouse is also the seat of White County government operations.

== History ==
White County was established by the laws of Illinois Territory. In 1815, during a period of rapid Euro-American settlement Southern Illinois after the War of 1812, the growing territory set up a new county on the Wabash River, and selected centrally-located Carmi, on the Little Wabash River, to be the county seat. The pioneer house-sized courthouse structure in use from 1815 until 1828, the Robinson-Stewart House, survives in Carmi. A historical marker near the front door, “Carmi’s Oldest House,” marks the old building.

In 1828, the citizens of White County built a new wooden courthouse, also in the center of Carmi. The 1820s framework survives, but has been entirely surrounded by and incorporated into a brick-built expansion raised in 1883−1884. Built in a stripped-down Second Empire style, this mostly brick building stands in use today. The structure's pediment carries the two dates “1828” and “1883.”
