= Cass County Courthouse (Illinois) =

Coordinates: 39°57′02″N 90°12′39″W

The Cass County Courthouse is the governmental center and courthouse of Cass County, Illinois. Its court sessions hear cases in the 8th circuit of Illinois judicial district 4. The county courthouse is located at 100 East Springfield Street in the county seat of Virginia.

== History ==
The current courthouse, the third to be used by Cass County, was built in 1872–1874 to finalize the county seat's move from its former location, Beardstown, to Virginia. The original section of the courthouse is a building of Italianate style with a Mansard roof, a porte-cochère, and narrow, arched windows.

After the creation of Cass County in 1837, the county in 1839 selected a central location, Virginia, to be its county seat. In the 1840s, county economic activity centered on steamboat traffic up and down the Illinois River, and the county seat moved in 1843 to Beardstown. This river port contained a brick courthouse used frequently by Illinois lawyer Abraham Lincoln. This Beardstown courthouse, the second Cass County courthouse structure, survives.

The construction of the Springfield and Illinois South Eastern Railway in 1871, which served Virginia and spanned the county, caused a second paradigm shift away from river boat traffic. Beardstown could be expected to oppose moving the county seat back to the center of the county, so in a strategic 1872 move the leading citizens of Virginia began to build a "city hall." During the process of construction, the city hall suddenly became the county courthouse. The ex-"city hall" remains the county courthouse as of 2025. Additions to the original Italianate structure were built in 1891, 1913, and 1939.
