= Knox County Courthouse (Knoxville, Illinois) =

- Knox County Courthouse and Hall of Records
- U.S. National Register of Historic Places
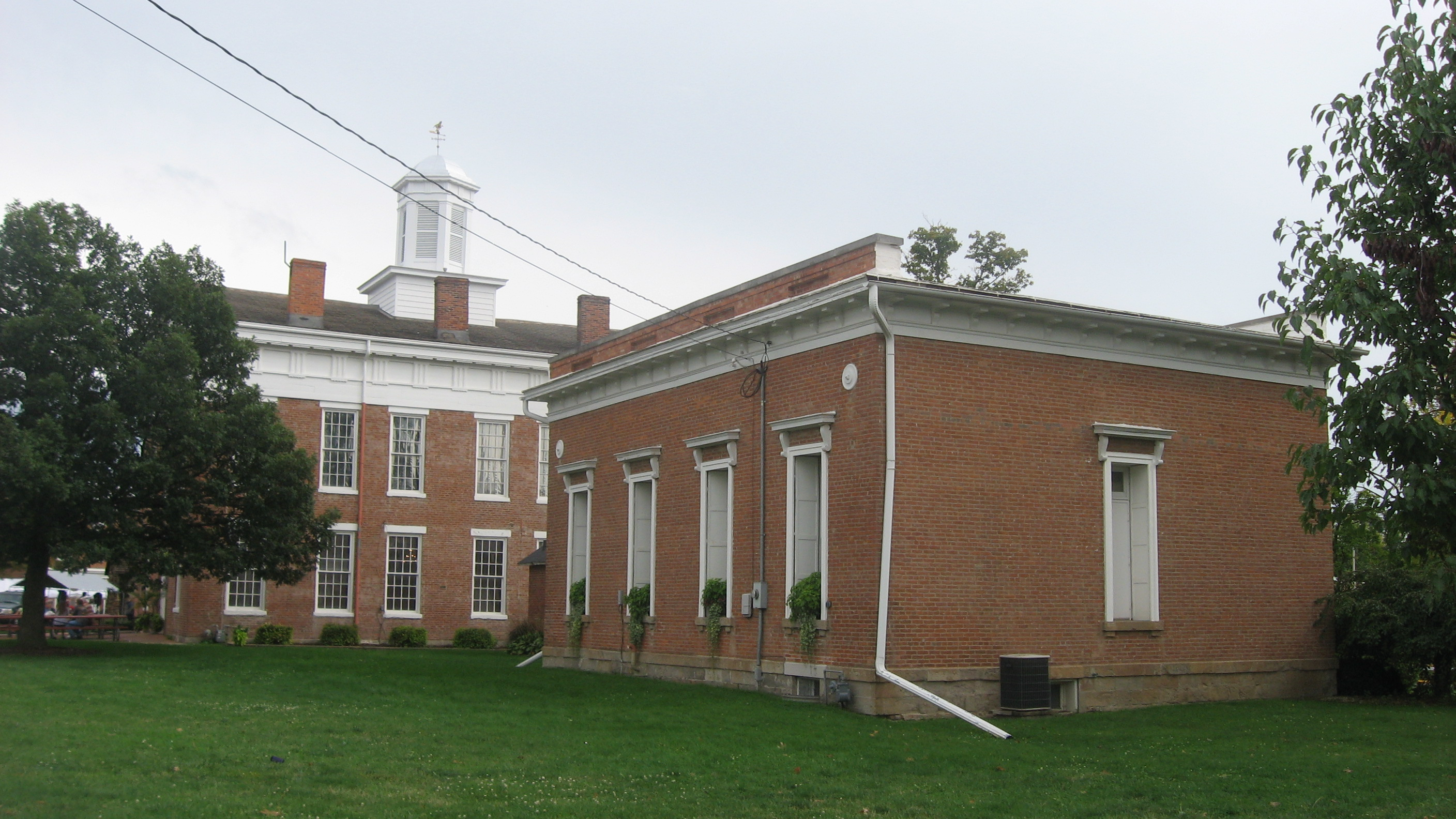

- Location within Illinois Location within the United States
- Location: Public Sq., Main St., Knoxville, Illinois
- Coordinates: 40°54′30″N 90°17′4″W
- Area: 1 acre (0.40 ha)
- Built: 1840
- Architect: John Mandeville
- Architectural style: Greek Revival
- NRHP reference No.: 92000051
- Added to NRHP: February 13, 1992

The Knox County Courthouse, located on the public square of Knoxville near its associated hall of records, is the former county courthouse of Knox County, Illinois. The courthouse was built in 1840 to replace the county's first courthouse; built in 1831 shortly after the county's organization, it had been outgrown by the end of the decade. Architect John Mandeville gave the building its Greek Revival design. The Hall of Records, which was designed by Charles Ulricson, was added in 1854 to house county records after the courthouse ran out of space for them. The Knox County seat moved to Galesburg in 1873; the courthouse and hall of records subsequently housed the Knoxville city hall and public library respectively until 1978, when the city government moved to the hall and the courthouse became a museum.

The buildings were added to the National Register of Historic Places on February 13, 1992.
