= Stark County Courthouse (Illinois) =

Local government building in the United States

Coordinates: 41°05′36″N 89°51′57″W

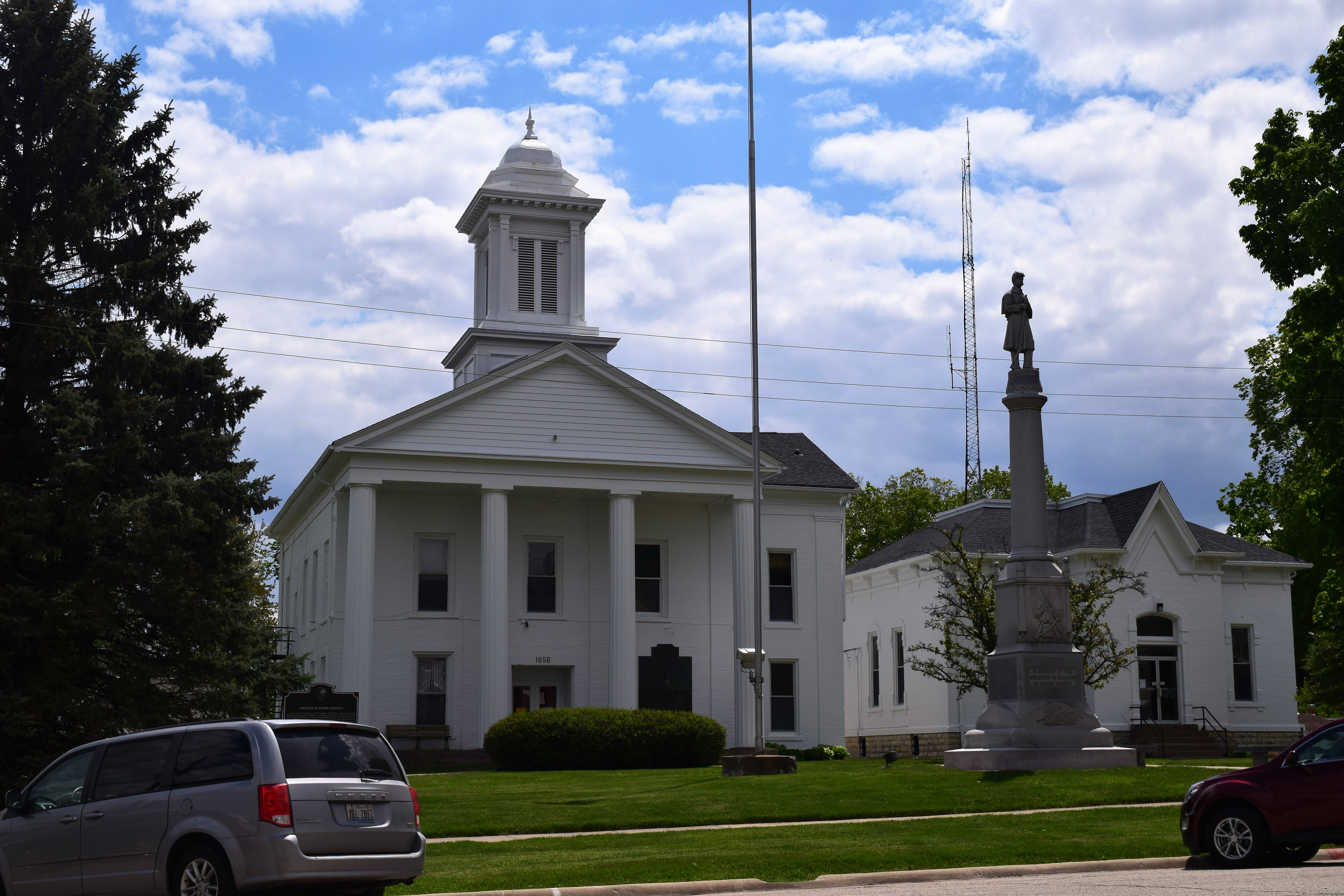
Stark County Courthouse

The Stark County Courthouse, located at 130 West Main Street in Toulon, Illinois, is the county courthouse serving Stark County, Illinois. Built in 1856-1857, it is a building of Greek Revival architecture. The cost of construction was $12,000.

== Description ==
The Stark County Courthouse holds court sessions on cases brought to it within its 10th Circuit jurisdiction. It is also the meeting place of the elected county board, and contains offices for the county. The 1856 Stark County Courthouse is the second building to serve this purpose. The first courthouse, a “plain wooden structure,” operated in 1842-1857.
