= Bond County Courthouse =

Coordinates: 38°53′33″N 89°24′47″W

The Bond County Courthouse is the courthouse of Bond County, Illinois. Its court sessions hear cases in the 3rd circuit of Illinois judicial district 5. The county courthouse is located at 200 West College Ave. in the county seat of Greenville. The courthouse is also the seat of Bond County government operations.

== History ==
The current Bond County courthouse, built in 1884–1885, is a Federal style building with modified Italianate windows. After its founding in 1817 and the selection of Greenville as the county seas in 1821, Bond County has had four courthouses. The first three, all which have vanished, were built in 1823, 1833, and 1853. The 1883−1884 courthouse was constructed at a cost, in Victorian era gold money, of $20,000.
