= Richland County Courthouse (Illinois) =

Local government building in the United States

Coordinates: 39°43′51″N 88°5′8″W

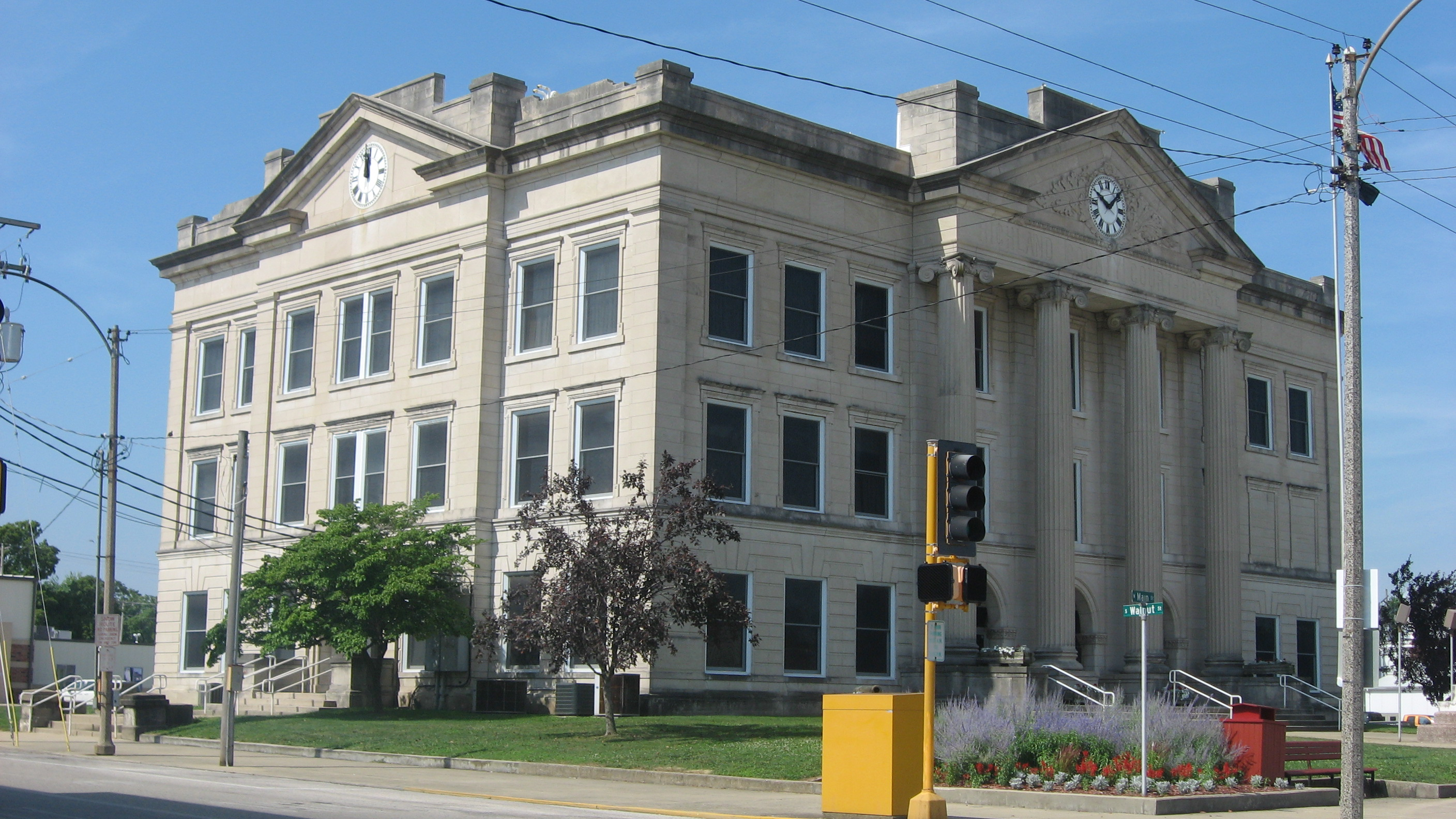
Front and side of the courthouse

The Richland County Courthouse is a government building in Olney, the county seat of Richland County, Illinois, United States. Built in 1914, it is the fourth building to serve as the county's courthouse.

== Local history ==
Civilization reached what is now Richland County in the 1810s. Surveying began in 1818, after the Indians had ceded the region, and while the first significant waves of settlers arrived in the same year, a few had come as early as 1815. By 1821, one settler had built a large tavern on the road from Vincennes to St. Louis.

As settlement in Illinois proceeded north from the Ohio River, large counties were gradually divided in order to enable residents to be close to their county seats. For this reason, Lawrence and Clay counties were formed out of Edwards County in the 1820s. The western section of Lawrence County and eastern section of Clay County were less populous and more distant from Lawrenceville and Louisville respectively, and as the region grew in population during the 1830s, agitation began for the creation of a new county. The General Assembly passed an enabling act in 1841, naming it "Richland County", but providing that the new county be created only if supported by voters in the two existing counties. Support was general, even in the areas not intended to become a part of the new county. Just two weeks after the successful vote, the electors of the new county met to choose a location for the new county seat. Five separate settlements sought the honor, and after strong support favored a pair of locations near each other at the county's center, the final location was chosen was a compromise between these two. A large number of names were suggested for the new town, and a public meeting finally resolved on "Olney", formerly the name of one of the two nearby contenders for county seat.

== Previous courthouses ==
The act enabling the county's creation had provided for the county's first public buildings to be constructed with the proceeds of selling land donated to become the county seat, but because funds for land purchase were unavailable, and because the county's entire tax rolls barely reached $200, the county couldn't afford to build. Beginning in late 1841, officials used a cabin on the Vincennes-St. Louis road, renting for $1 per month and providing a stove to heat the building. The situation was rectified in September 1842, when the newly founded Methodist Episcopal Church found itself able to build. In exchange for granting the church a lot, the county obtained the right to use the church building for official purposes, and after this building was completed in November, it served as courthouse, school, and church. The building measured 20 by 24 feet (6.1 m × 7.3 m), and although built of logs, it survived into the 1880s.

This multi-use building being intended as temporary, in 1843 the county arranged for the construction of a dedicated courthouse building. Intended to be 40 feet (12 m) on a side and 24 feet (7.3 m) tall, the two-story frame building rested on a stone foundation and was completed for about $3,000. A courtroom occupied the lower floor, and county offices the upper. Because the original contractors went out of business, the new courthouse was not completed until 1847.

After a quarter century, the county government decided that a third courthouse was needed. A budget of $25,000 was reserved for the construction, architect John C. Cochrane was chosen to design it, and the cornerstone was laid in July 1874. Its overall style was Italianate, and the plan was a stretched Greek cross, 106 feet (32 m) east to west and 65 feet (20 m) north to south. A clock topped a central tower, a pediment with oculus sat above the main entrance, and a portico with twin pillars sheltered the main entrance. The two-story brick walls were pieced with triple rounded arch windows at each end and in each segment of the long sides, and Tuscan-style pilasters were placed at the corners. Because many elements of wood in the original design were replaced with stone, the building's construction cost was far higher than expected, slightly surpassing $37,000. Two years after its completion, the new courthouse became the model for the new Jasper County Courthouse in Newton.

== Current courthouse ==
Because the early frame courthouse was deemed vulnerable to fire, Richland County constructed a brick building on the courthouse square to house county records and certain offices. Although a similar material was employed for the 1874 courthouse, brick still proved vulnerable: the third courthouse burned in October 1913. County officials obtained the services of John W. Gaddis for the fourth courthouse, and construction was completed in 1914. The new building is a rectangular three-story Neoclassical stone structure. Pedimented porticos featuring Ionic capitals and public clocks shelter the entrances on the various sides, and the building features a generally flat roof. Above the main entrance, "RICHLAND COUNTY COURT HOUSE" is inscribed on the architrave.
