= Christian County Courthouse (Illinois) =

Coordinates: 39°32′56″N 89°17′44″W

The Christian County Courthouse is the governmental center of Christian County, Illinois. The court sessions held there hear cases in the 4th circuit of the Illinois judicial district 5. The courthouse is located at 101 South Main Street in the county seat of Taylorville.

The current courthouse is the second such structure to serve the people of Christian County. Both courthouses have been located on the Taylorville town square. After the county's founding in 1939, the first courthouse was erected in 1840. This frame structure heard cases and pleadings presented by circuit lawyer Abraham Lincoln. After the first structure became obsolete in the late 1800s, the county built a new Romanesque Revival courthouse structure in 1901-1902. The cost at the time was $100,000. This courthouse remains in use, and was extensively restored in 2002.

== Lincoln courthouse ==
The wood-frame Lincoln courthouse survives, although it has been moved and rebuilt several times. Its current location is on the grounds of the Christian County Historical Society at 325 Abe's Way and Kennedy Drive.
