= Knox County Courthouse (Maine) =

- U.S. National Register of Historic Places
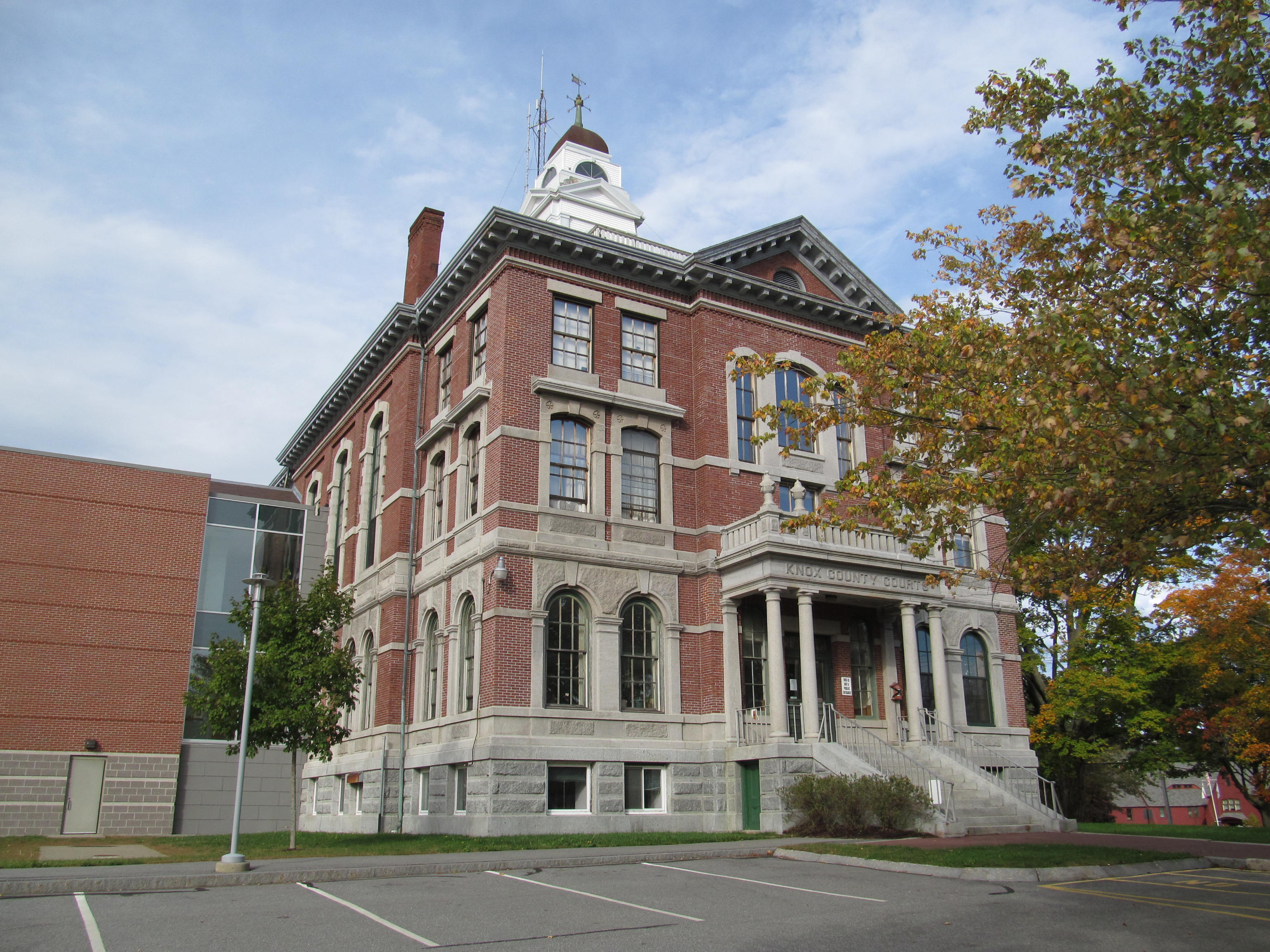

- Location within Maine Location within the United States
- Location: 62 Union St., Rockland, Maine
- Coordinates: 44°6′14″N 69°6′43″W
- Area: 1 acre (0.40 ha)
- Built: 1874
- Architect: Bryant, Gridley F.; Rogers, Lewis P.
- Architectural style: Italianate
- NRHP reference No.: 77000075
- Added to NRHP: April 18, 1977

The Knox County Courthouse is located at 62 Union Street in downtown Rockland, the county seat of Knox County, Maine. The oldest portion of the courthouse was designed by Gridley James Fox Bryant and was built in 1874. A prominent local example of Italianate architecture, it has been the county's seat of operations since its construction. It was listed on the National Register of Historic Places in 1977.

== Description and history ==
The Knox County Courthouse stands on the west side of downtown Rockland, occupying most of a city block bounded by Union, Masonic, High, and Limerock Streets. It is a roughly U-shaped building, three stories in height. Most of the building is a modern steel-framed structure, its exterior finished in brick. The original 1874 courthouse forms the northeastern leg of the U. It is three stories in height, set on a high granite foundation. Its main entrance is accessed via a flight of granite stairs, and is sheltered by a rectangular porch supported by round stone Doric columns and square pilasters. The porch is capped by a balustrade with urned posts. The windows on the first two floors are set in ornate round-arch and segmented-arch openings.

Knox County was separated from adjacent Lincoln County in 1860, with Rockland as its county seat. County offices were in the early years dispersed in a commercial buildings, and were eventually centralized into a single building. This being judged inadequate, the county in 1874 retained Boston architect Gridley James Fox Bryant to design the present building. Gridley was assisted by Lewis P. Rogers, also a Boston architect. The building was constructed at a cost of $83,000, well over the anticipated $50,000 cost, and opened for business in 1875. The modern addition to the rear and side were built in 1978.

== See also ==
- National Register of Historic Places listings in Knox County, Maine
