= Labadie Power Station =

Powerplant in Missouri, U.S.

Coordinates: 38°33′44″N 90°50′14″W

Labadie is the largest coal-fired power plant in Missouri. It is operated by Ameren Missouri in Franklin County, Missouri.

In 2023, Labadie was the second-largest producer of greenhouse gases in the U.S., emitting 15.4 million tons of CO2.

Labadie received notice of Clean Air Act violations from the EPA in at least 2010 and 2011, being cited for “major modifications that caused a significant net emissions increase” without first obtaining proper permits. Unlike most coal energy plants, the Labadie coal plant does not have sulfur dioxide scrubbers, making it the country's highest emitter of the pollutant, according to a St. Louis Post-Dispatch report in 2024. Even if Labadie's SO2 emissions were cut in half, it would still emit more than all but two coal plants in the country.

A 2023 Sierra Club report included Ameren's Labadie Energy Center among the 17 deadliest coal plants in the US, with calls for the EPA to pass regulations on harmful emissions contributing to regional haze affecting neighboring communities. A study published in the journal Science used Medicare records to estimate the number of deaths tied to air pollution from coal plants, estimating that from 1999 to 2020, about 4,000 deaths were linked to “fine particulate matter” from Labadie, far more than any other coal plant across seven Midwestern states.

In 2026, protesters created and destroyed a piñata of the Labadie Power Station following Ameren's announcement of delaying the shut down of Labadie and expanding both natural gas and coal plants in Missouri to support data center construction.
