= Illinois Traction Building =

- U.S. National Register of Historic Places
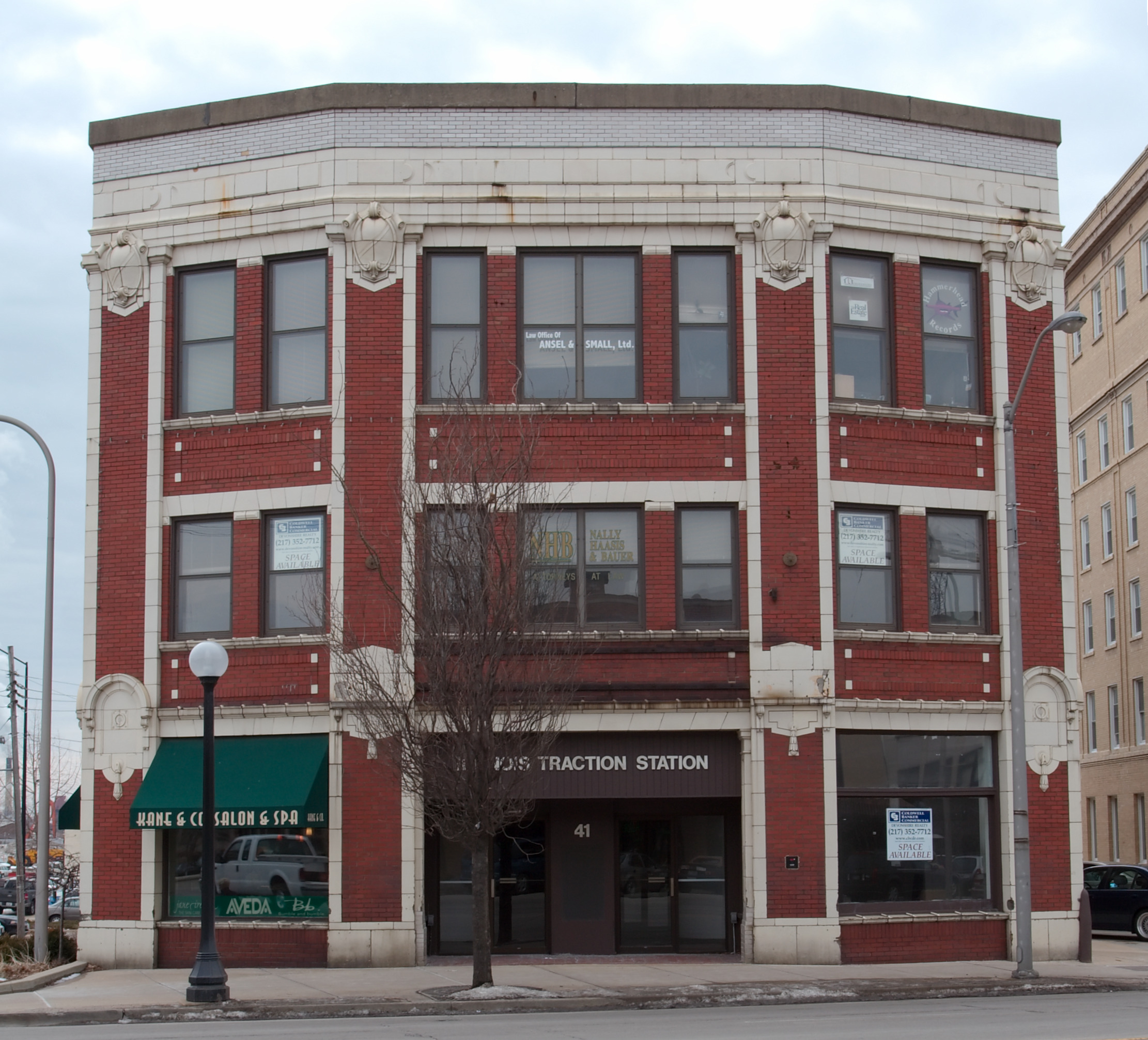

- Location within Illinois Location within the United States
- Location: 41 E. University Ave., Champaign, Illinois
- Coordinates: 40°6′58″N 88°14′0″W
- Area: less than one acre
- Built: 1913
- Built by: McKinley, William B.
- Architect: Royer, Joseph
- NRHP reference No.: 86003782
- Added to NRHP: September 20, 2006

The Illinois Traction Building, located at 41 E. University Ave. in Champaign, Illinois, United States, was the headquarters of the Illinois Traction System, an interurban railroad serving Central Illinois. Built in 1913, the building held the railway's offices and served as the Champaign interurban station until 1936; it later housed the offices of the Illinois Power Company, which descended from the Illinois Traction System. Architect Joseph Royer planned the building in a contemporary commercial design. The building was added to the National Register of Historic Places on September 20, 2006.

== History ==
The Illinois Traction System was established by William B. McKinley in the 1890s and 1900s. McKinley began his system by purchasing and electrifying local streetcar lines. In 1902, the system opened its first interurban line between Champaign and St. Joseph, and by 1911 it linked most major cities in Central Illinois, as well as St. Louis, Missouri. The company built the Illinois Traction Building in 1913 to replace its previous Champaign station; the new building had a central location and office space for the company. In 1928, the Illinois Traction System became part of the Illinois Terminal Railroad; its utility division became the Illinois Power and Light Company and maintained offices in the Traction Building. Streetcar service to the building ended in 1936, when a new owner replaced the lines with bus service; while interurban trains continued to serve Champaign, they stopped at a different station. The building continued to house the utility company, which became known as the Illinois Power Company, until it moved to a different building in 1985.

== Architecture ==
Architect Joseph Royer designed the Illinois Traction Building in a contemporary commercial style. The building was a departure from Royer's previous work, which was primarily done in rustic or massive styles such as Romanesque. The three-story building is built from red brick and has terra cotta detailing. Four piers divide the three-bay front facade; the two side bays are slightly bowed. Terra cotta medallions top each pier, and scrolled shields on the piers mark the top of the first floor. The windows on each floor feature terra cotta sills and lintels. The building's original terra cotta cornice has been replaced by a white brick pediment.
