= Urbana-Lincoln Hotel-Lincoln Square Mall =

- Urbana--Lincoln Hotel--Lincoln Square Mall
- U.S. National Register of Historic Places
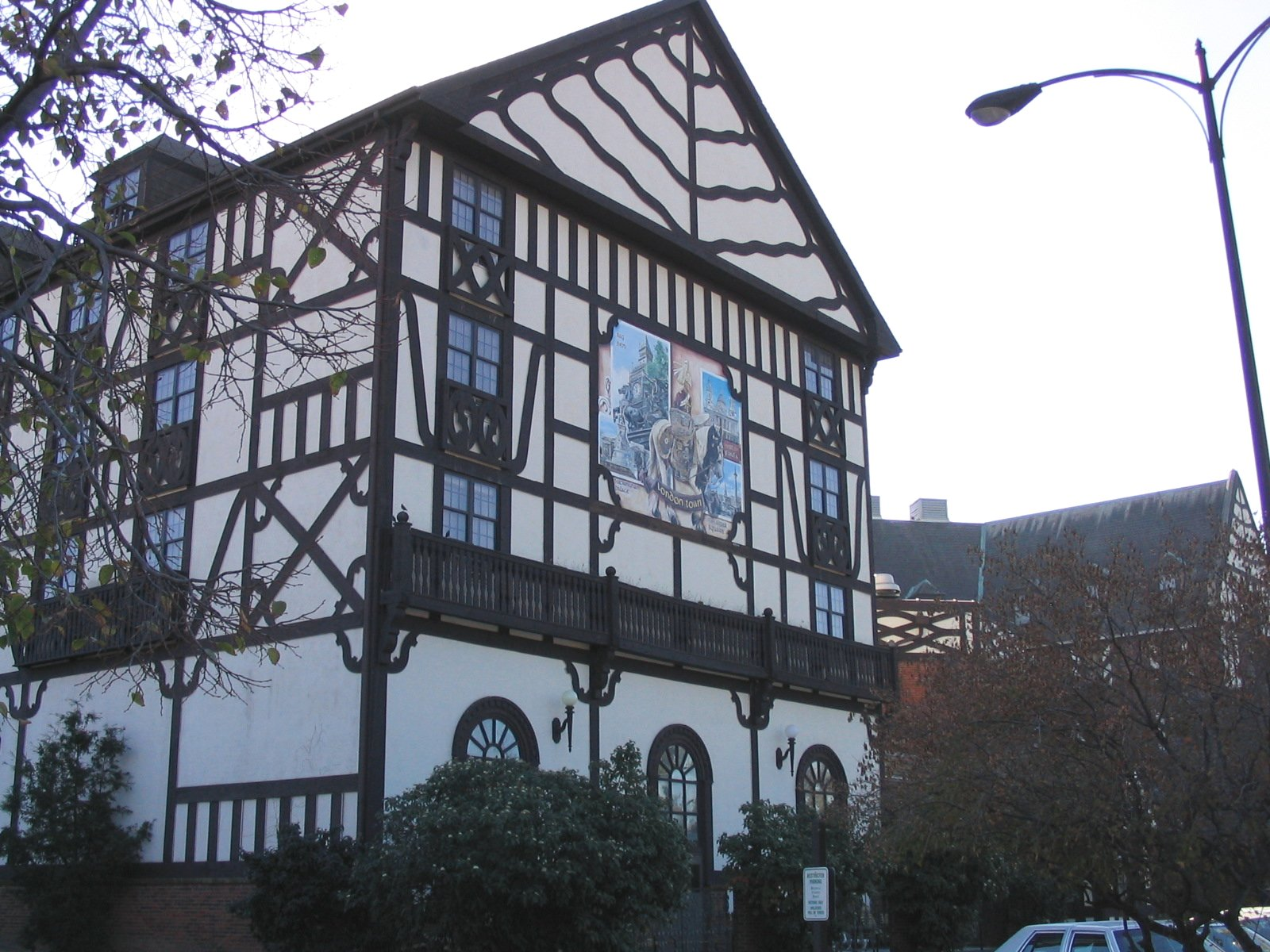

- Location within Illinois Location within the United States
- Location: 300 S. Broadway Ave., Urbana, Illinois
- Coordinates: 40°6′38″N 88°12′26″W
- Area: 13.9 acres (5.6 ha)
- Built: 1923
- Architect: Royer, Joseph; Gruen, Victor
- Architectural style: Tudor Revival
- NRHP reference No.: 06000778
- Added to NRHP: September 8, 2006

The Urbana-Lincoln Hotel – Lincoln Square Mall is a historic building complex located at 300 South Broadway Avenue in Urbana, Illinois. The Tudor Revival style hotel was built in 1923. In 1964, the mall was built as an extension of the hotel and was one of the first fully enclosed shopping malls in Illinois. The hotel, the mall, and the building complex was listed on the National Register of Historic Places in 2006.

== Hotel history ==
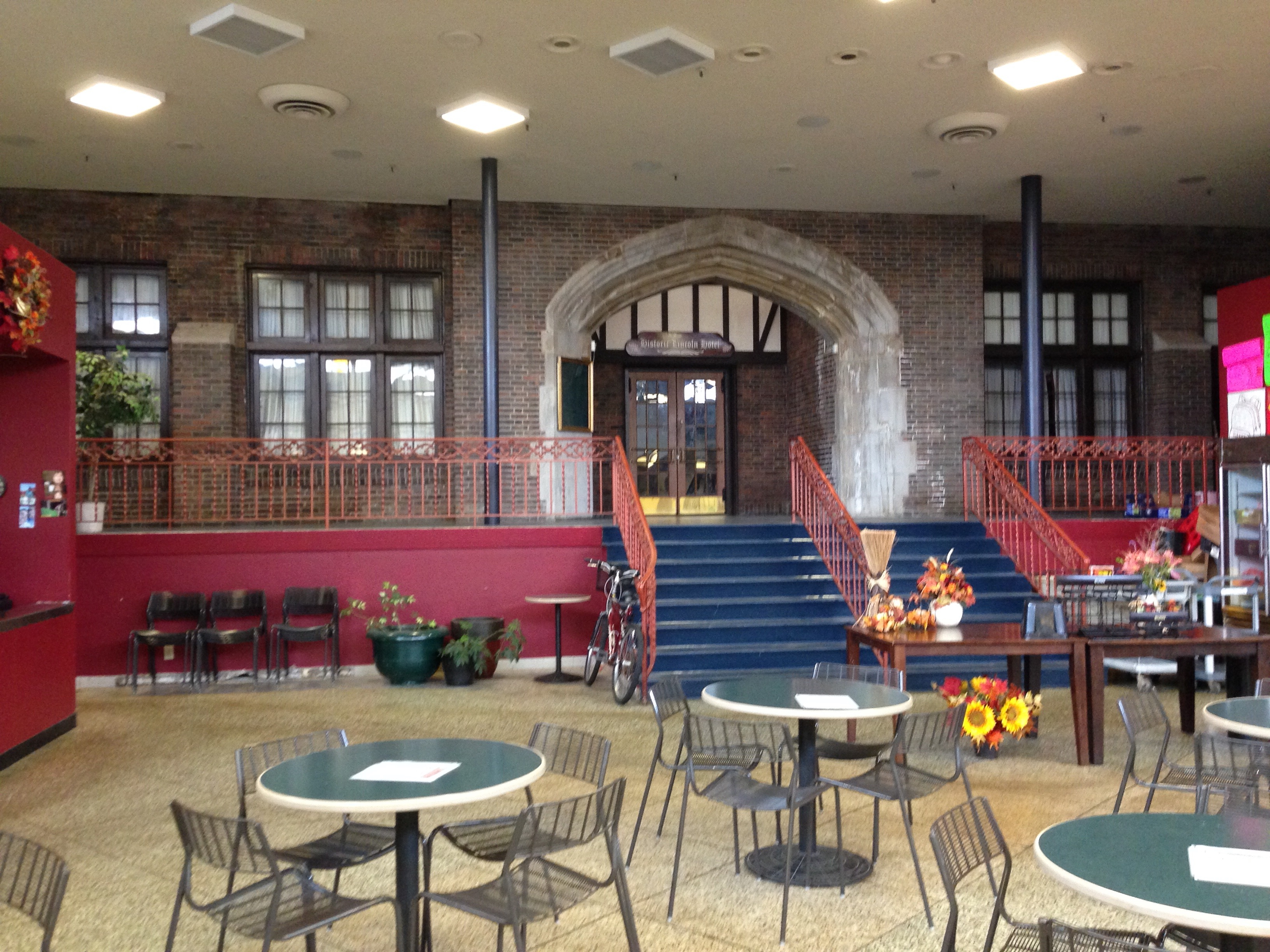
Urbana Landmark Hotel Mall Entrance

A local booster organization called the Urbana Hotel Company began raising money for a hotel in Urbana in 1921. The group raised $223,000 by selling shares in the hotel, and construction on the Urbana-Lincoln Hotel began in 1923. The hotel opened to guests by November of that year and was formally dedicated on January 31, 1924. Local architect Joseph Royer designed the hotel in the Tudor Revival style; the building features extensive half-timbering on its stucco exterior. The hotel was not profitable, and the Urbana Hotel Company went bankrupt in 1937; the hotel stayed open after the company was reorganized.

A new management company, the Urbana-Lincoln Company, took over the hotel in 1944 and extensively modernized it in the following decade. The hotel was incorporated into the mall's plans from the outset and was sold to mall owners Carson Pirie Scott shortly after the mall opened. After failing to turn a profit, the hotel closed in 1975 and was slated to be demolished. In the 1970s, the Jumer Hotel chain purchased the hotel. The new owners renovated and reopened the hotel later in the decade, and an addition was built on the building in 1982. The Jumer Hotel chain sold the hotel in 2001.

From 2001 the hotel was bought and sold multiple times. In 2010, developer Xiao Jin "XJ" Yuan bought the hotel for $600,000, renaming it the Urbana Landmark Hotel. Yuan made renovations to the hotel, including fixing the roof, upgrading the HVAC and plumbing systems, and modernizing some rooms. Yuan's plans were to open the hotel in phases beginning in 2012. In July 2015, Yuan put the hotel up for sale for $5.4M, and the hotel closed in April 2016.

After three failed attempts to sell the hotel, Icon Hospitality LLC purchased the hotel in January 2020 for $1M, with plans to invest $15M into renovations and re-open the hotel as the Hotel Royer Urbana, Tapestry Collection by Hilton. The renovated hotel was set to open in late 2024, after a series of previous estimates given by developers to Urbana city officials regarding the date of the hotel's opening passed with renovations still incomplete. On April 16, 2025, with years-long renovations of the historic hotel finally complete, the former Urbana-Lincoln Hotel opened its doors for overnight stays for the first time in half a decade, now bearing the name of the iconic Urbana architect responsible for the design of the hotel's original construction a century prior. The redeveloped Hotel Royer opened with a total of 131 rooms for guest stays, and its 'Writer's Room' restaurant & 'Lloyd's Parlor' bar are both open to the public.

== Mall history ==
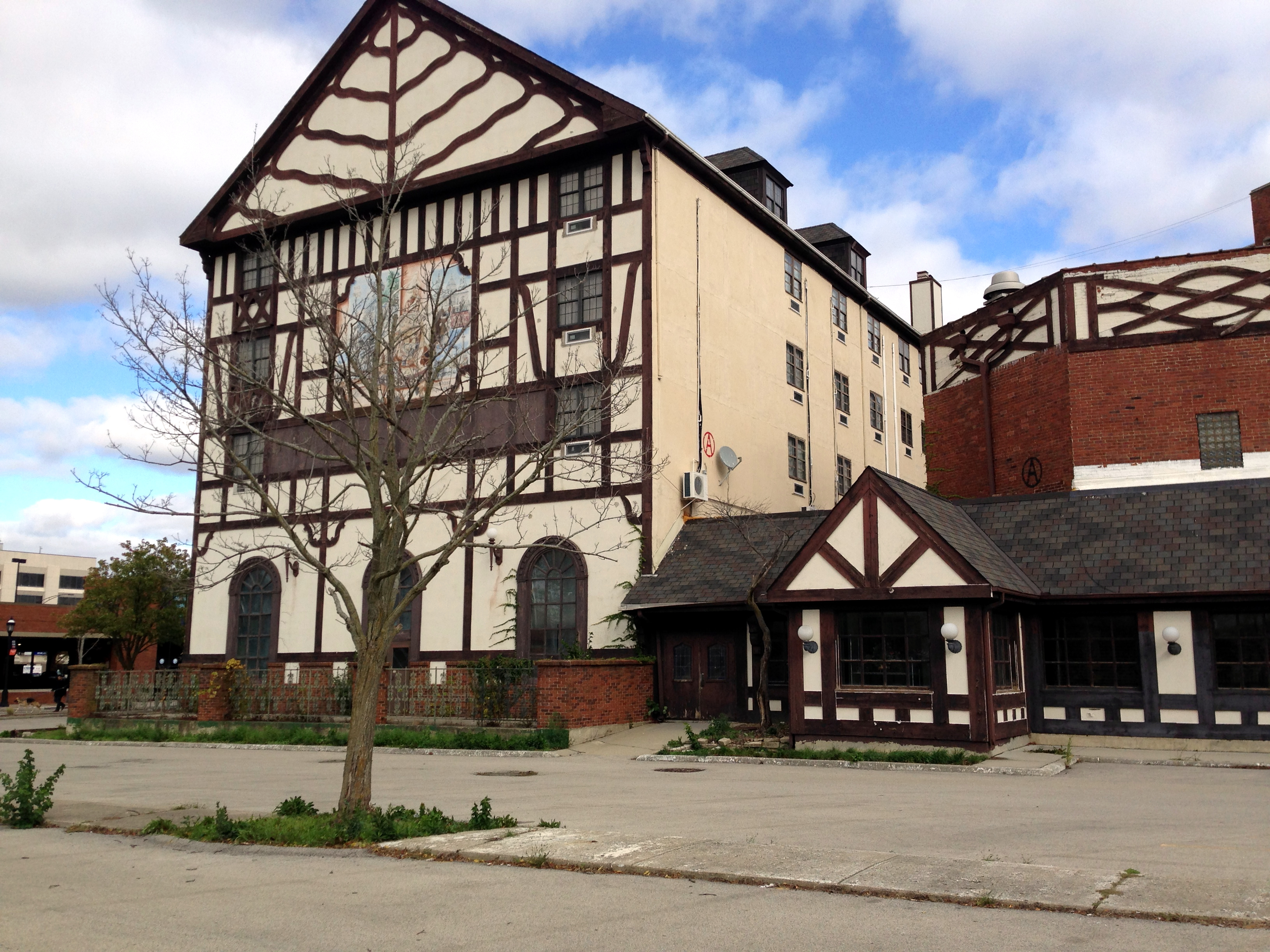
Exterior of the Urbana Landmark Hotel

Due to a general sentiment that Urbana's economy was stagnating, local business leaders reached out to several large retailers in the late 1950s in an attempt to attract a store to the city. Carson Pirie Scott expressed interest in the city if it were willing to build a large commercial development, sparking the Lincoln Square Mall project. The city began plans for a mall in 1960 and hired nationally recognized developer Victor Gruen to plan the mall. The Urbana Central Development Company, a subsidiary of Carson Pirie Scott, acquired the land for the mall in 1961, and the name Lincoln Square was chosen the following year. The mall was built and opened in 1964, becoming the first fully enclosed shopping mall in Illinois outside of the Chicago metropolitan area. Illinois Governor Otto Kerner, Jr. and both of the state's U.S. Senators attended the mall's grand opening on September 17. The mall's stores mainly sold clothing and other fashionable goods in order to draw shoppers from surrounding areas; the developers intended for the mall to serve residents in a 50-mile (80 km) radius around Urbana.

The mall was successful during its first two decades, and most of its original businesses either stayed or were replaced by similar businesses. Starting in the mid-1980s, however, competition from surrounding malls led to the beginning of the mall's decline. Carson Pirie Scott sold the mall in 1988; its anchor store was converted to a Bergner's and later a Herberger's. Herberger's and the mall's ownership group renovated the mall in 1994, but Herberger's went bankrupt three years later, and the store was converted into a Bergner's again, which closed in 2002; the mall failed to attract another anchor and subdivided the store's space into smaller stores. The mall remains open and continues to house many smaller stores and law offices.
