= Grundy County Courthouse (Illinois) =

Coordinates: 41°21′25″N 88°25′23″W

The Grundy County Courthouse is the courthouse of Grundy County, Illinois. Its court sessions hear cases in the 13th circuit of Illinois judicial district 3. The county courthouse is located at 111 East Washington St. in the county seat of Morris. The courthouse is also the seat of Grundy County government operations.

== History ==
The Grundy County courthouse, of which the north-facing section was built in 1912-1913, is a Classical Revival structure with a façade of cut limestone. The structure is one of several Illinois courthouses designed by architect Joseph W. Royer. The historic circuit courtroom continues to occupy and use second floor space in the original building. In 2009, the Illinois State Bar Association (ISBA) celebrated the 1912 judicial courtroom.

In 1975-1976, the county built a major annex structure south of the original building. The annex contains law enforcement space, with limited fenestration (windows) signaling to passers-by the presence of the county jail.

Two earlier Grundy County courthouses have disappeared. The first courthouse was a frame structure used in 1842-1858, and the second courthouse was used in 1858-1912.
