= Clay County Courthouse (Illinois) =

Local government building in the United States

- U.S. National Register of Historic Places
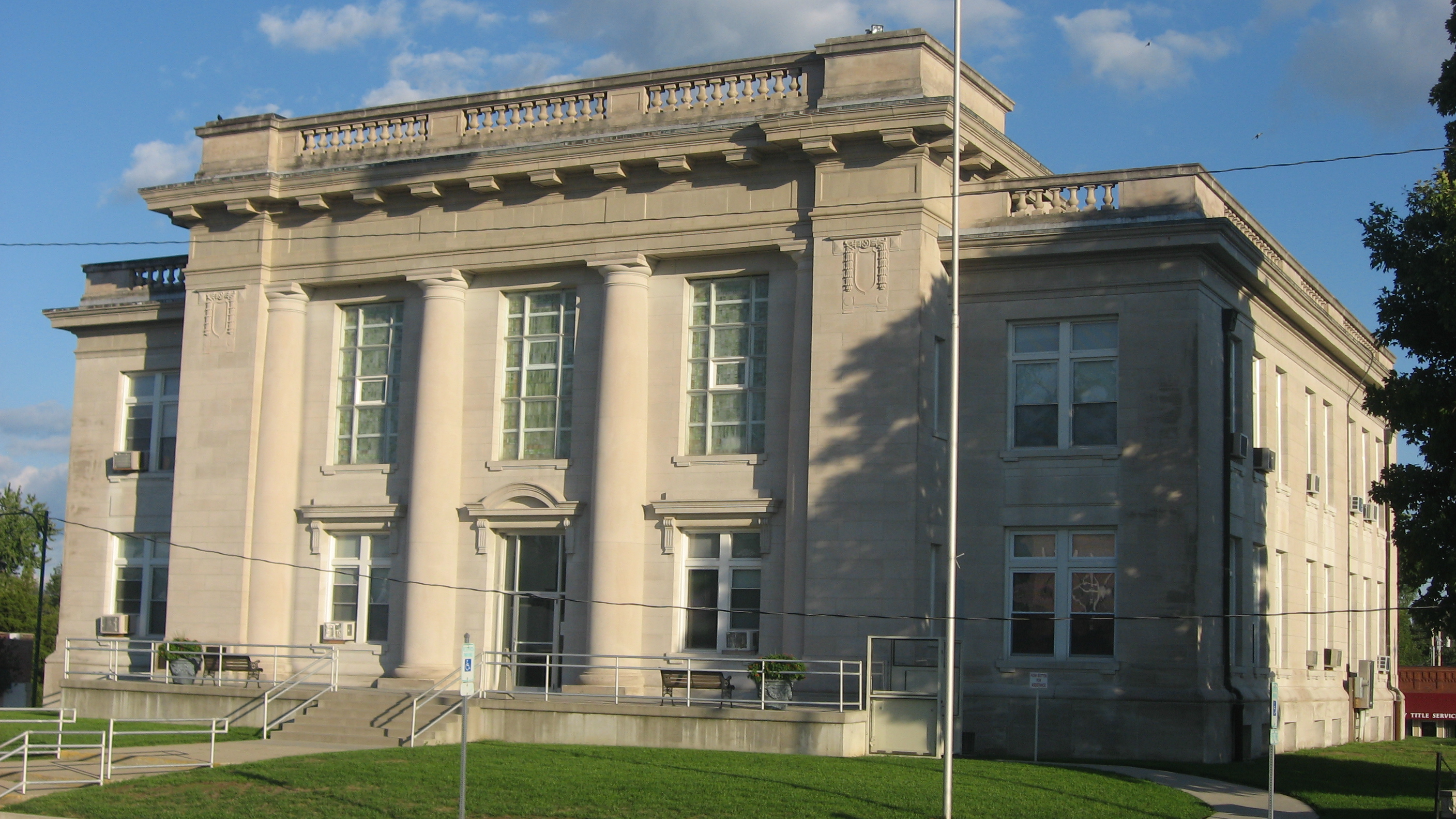
- The north side of the courthouse

- Location within Illinois Location within the United States
- Interactive map showing the location of Clay County Courthouse
- Location: 300 Broadway St., Louisville, Illinois
- Coordinates: 38°46′24″N 88°29′55″W
- Built: 1913
- Architect: Joseph W. Royer
- Architectural style: Classical Revival
- NRHP reference No.: 15000224
- Added to NRHP: May 18, 2015

The Clay County Courthouse, located at 300 Broadway Street in Louisville, is the county courthouse serving Clay County, Illinois. Built in 1913, the courthouse was Clay County's fourth courthouse; it has served continuously as the seat of Clay County government since its opening. Architect Joseph W. Royer, who planned several other Illinois courthouses, designed the Classical Revival building. The courthouse was added to the National Register of Historic Places in 2015.

== History ==
Clay County was formed in 1824, and its county commissioners established its first county seat in Hubbardsville the following year. Local landowner Daniel May donated the land for and built the county's first courthouse, a wooden building; the county seat was renamed Maysville in his honor. The Illinois State Legislature ordered a meeting of the county commissioners in 1841 to discuss relocating the county seat, and the commissioners decided to move the seat to Louisville. After some legal difficulties, Louisville's first permanent courthouse opened in 1846. Clay County received its third courthouse in the 1870s, when a two-story Italianate building replaced the 1846 courthouse. Throughout the late 19th century, the citizens of Flora attempted to relocate the county seat to their city; however, Louisville won two relocation votes in 1861 and the early 1900s and kept the seat. The county planned to remodel its courthouse; however, it ultimately opted to build an entirely new building. This building, the current courthouse, was completed in 1913. Louisville's newspaper, the Southern Illinois Record, initially showed some editorial skepticism as to the need for a new building; by the time of its completion, though, it had rallied behind the new courthouse, which it described as one of the finest in Southern Illinois. The 1913 courthouse has housed the county's many government functions and kept its public records since its construction. It was added to the National Register of Historic Places on May 18, 2015.

== Architecture ==
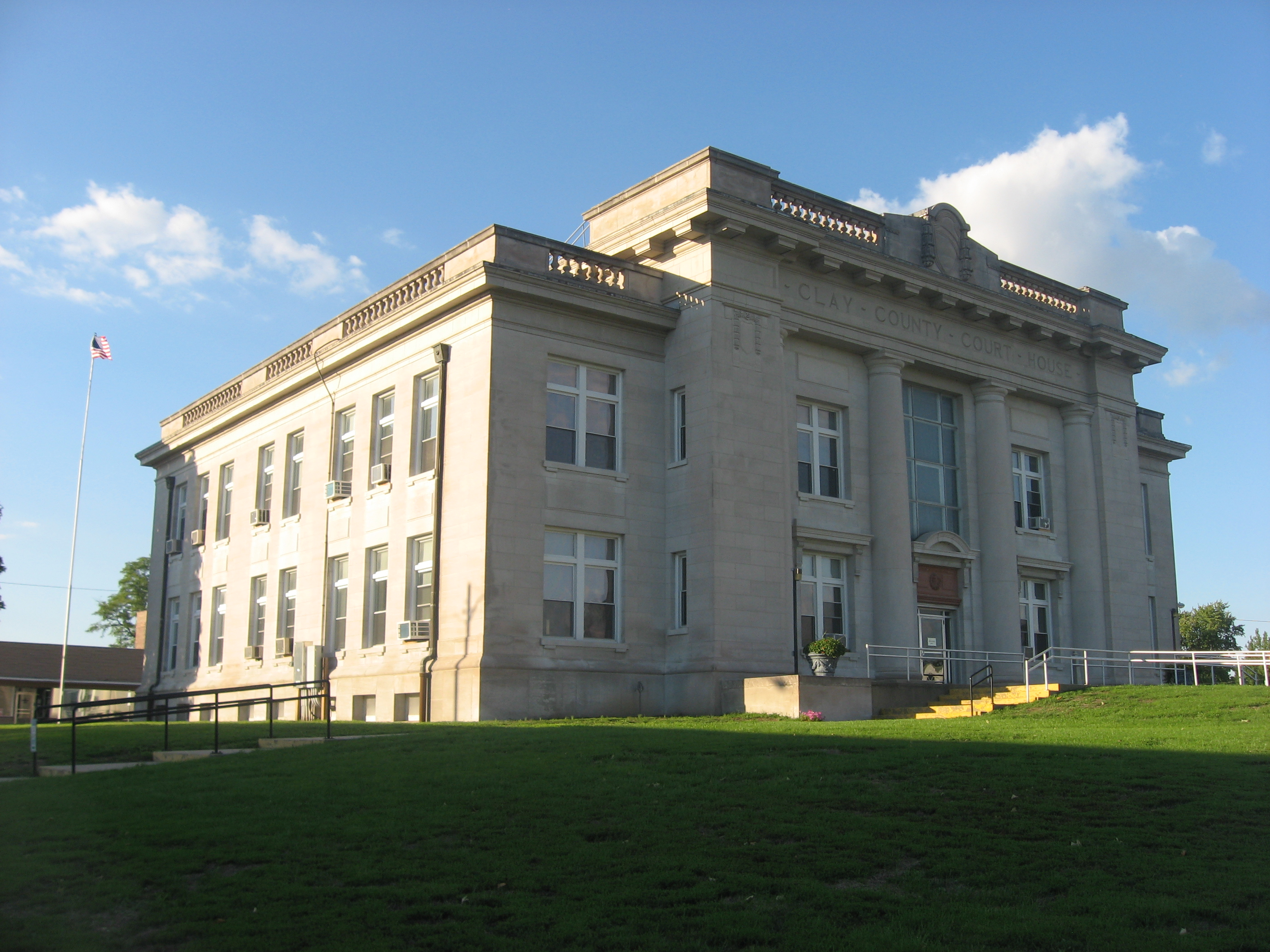
The south and west sides of the courthouse

Architect Joseph W. Royer of Urbana, Illinois designed the courthouse. Royer designed many government buildings across the Midwest throughout his career; his other designs in Illinois included courthouses in Champaign, Douglas, Marion, and Piatt counties. Royer used the Classical Revival style, which became popular in America in the 1890s and remained so through the 1940s, for the courthouse. The building is situated on a mound in Louisville's village square and is the highest and most prominent building in the city's downtown. The two-story structure has a square main block with slightly shorter wings on the east and west sides. The main entrances to the courthouse are located on the north and south sides of the building; the south entrance, which was originally the front entrance, has more ornamentation than its northern counterpart. Both sides have three bays in the central block and one each on the wings; the central bays are demarcated by four Tuscan columns. Both entrances are topped by a transom and segmental arch, with a panel between the two on the south side; windows with bracketed entablatures adjoin each entrance. A balustrade encircles the roof's edge and is punctuated by a pediment with a cartouche above the south entrance. Interior decorations include Doric columns, fretwork floor tiles, Roman-style grilles, and architrave trim.
