= Alpha Xi Delta Sorority Chapter House (Champaign, Illinois) =

- U.S. National Register of Historic Places
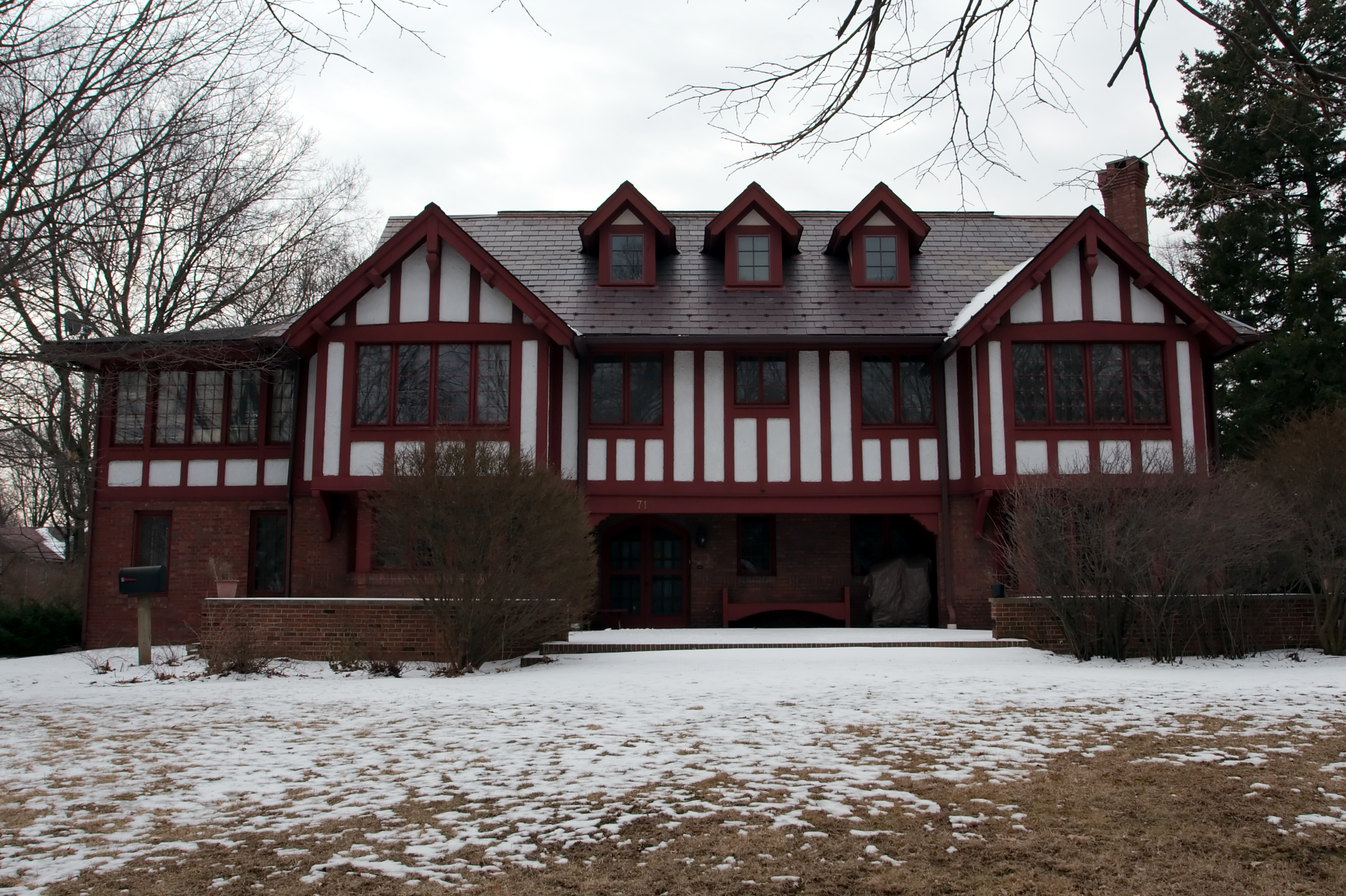

- Location within Illinois Location within the United States
- Location: 715 W. Michigan Ave., Urbana, Illinois
- Coordinates: 40°6′5″N 88°13′6″W
- Area: less than one acre
- Built: 1915
- Architect: Royer, Joseph W.
- Architectural style: Tudor Revival
- MPS: Fraternity and Sorority Houses at the Urbana--Champaign Campus of the University of Illinois MPS
- NRHP reference No.: 89001110
- Added to NRHP: August 28, 1989

The Alpha Xi Delta Sorority Chapter House is a historic sorority house located at the University of Illinois at Urbana–Champaign in Urbana, Illinois. Built in 1915 as a private home, the house was purchased by the Kappa Chapter of the Alpha Xi Delta sorority in 1928. The chapter was formed in 1905 and rented houses until purchasing the house, which was near a developing sorority row east of the university campus. Architect Joseph W. Royer designed the house in the Tudor Revival style. The house's design features vertical half-timbering on the upper stories, decorative brickwork on the first floor, two steep cross gables and multiple dormers projecting from the roof, and multiple brick chimneys.

The house was added to the National Register of Historic Places on August 28, 1989.
