= Joseph Royer (architect) =

American architect (1873–1954)

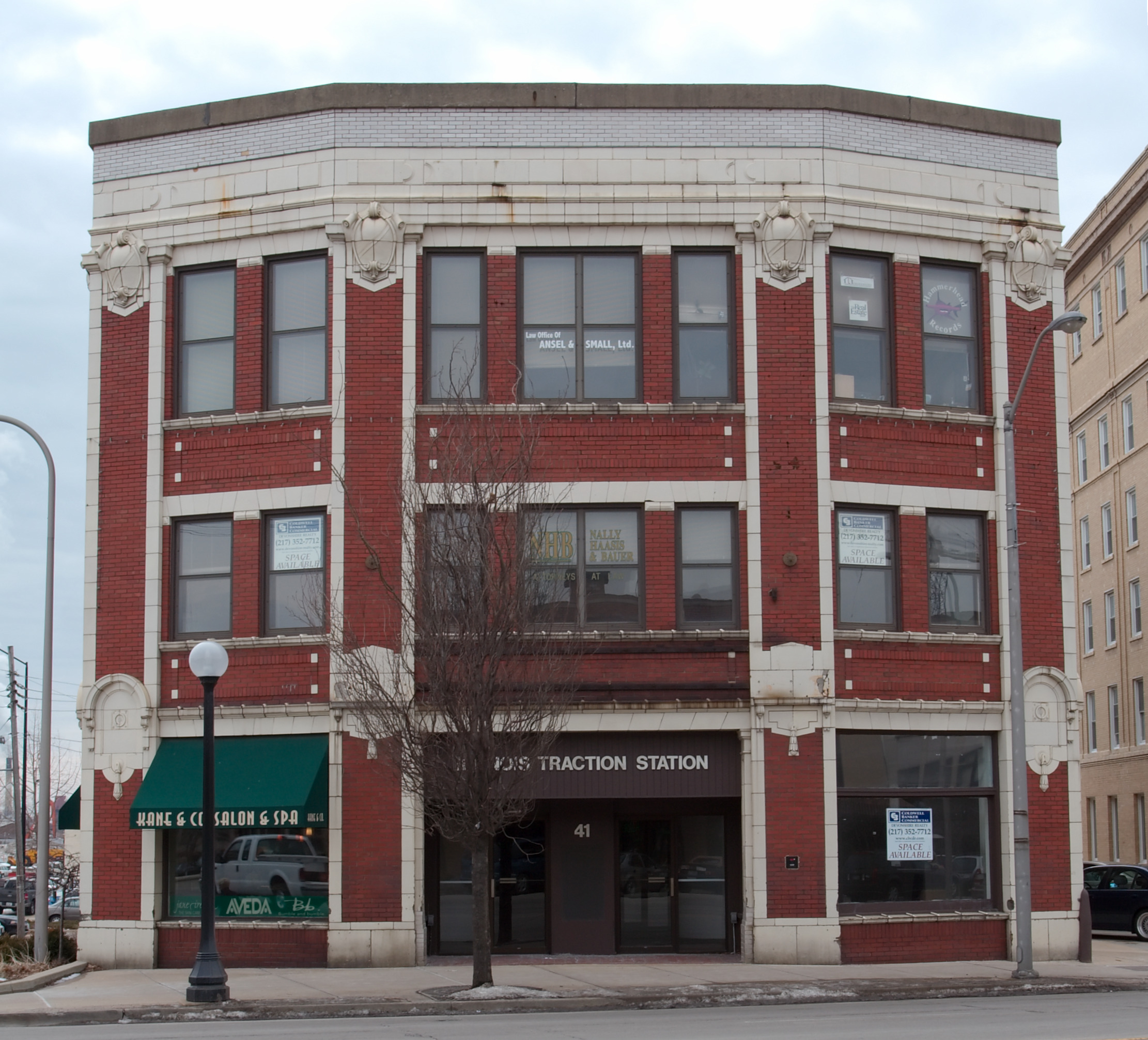
Illinois Traction Building

Joseph William Royer (1873–1954) was an American architect based in Urbana, Illinois. He designed numerous civic, educational, commercial, and residential buildings in Urbana, Champaign, and other communities. Several of his works are listed on the National Register of Historic Places and reflect a variety of architectural styles.

== Early life and education ==
Joseph Royer was born in Urbana on August 2, 1873. He attended Urbana High School and later studied at the University of Illinois, where he earned a degree in civil engineering in 1895.

== Professional career ==
From 1898 to 1906, Royer served as Urbana's city engineer. During this time, he designed the Champaign County Courthouse, which earned him his first major local recognition.

In 1905, he established an architecture firm initially called Royer and Brown. Over the years, the firm underwent several name changes, including Royer and Smith, Royer, Danely, and Smith, and Royer and Davis. The practice remained active until Royer's death in 1954, with roughly 100 projects attributed to the firm.

== Personal residence ==
In 1905, Royer designed his own residence at 801 W. Oregon Street in Urbana, where he lived for the remainder of his life. The eight-bedroom house, built in the Mission Revival style, is thought to have been inspired by the "California Building" at the St. Louis World's Fair in 1904.

In 1923, he designed a neighboring house for his mother-in-law in the English Cottage Revival style. Both houses are protected as part of the Royer Historic District, designated by the city of Urbana.

Several of Royer’s works are listed on the National Register of Historic Places for their architectural significance.

== Work ==
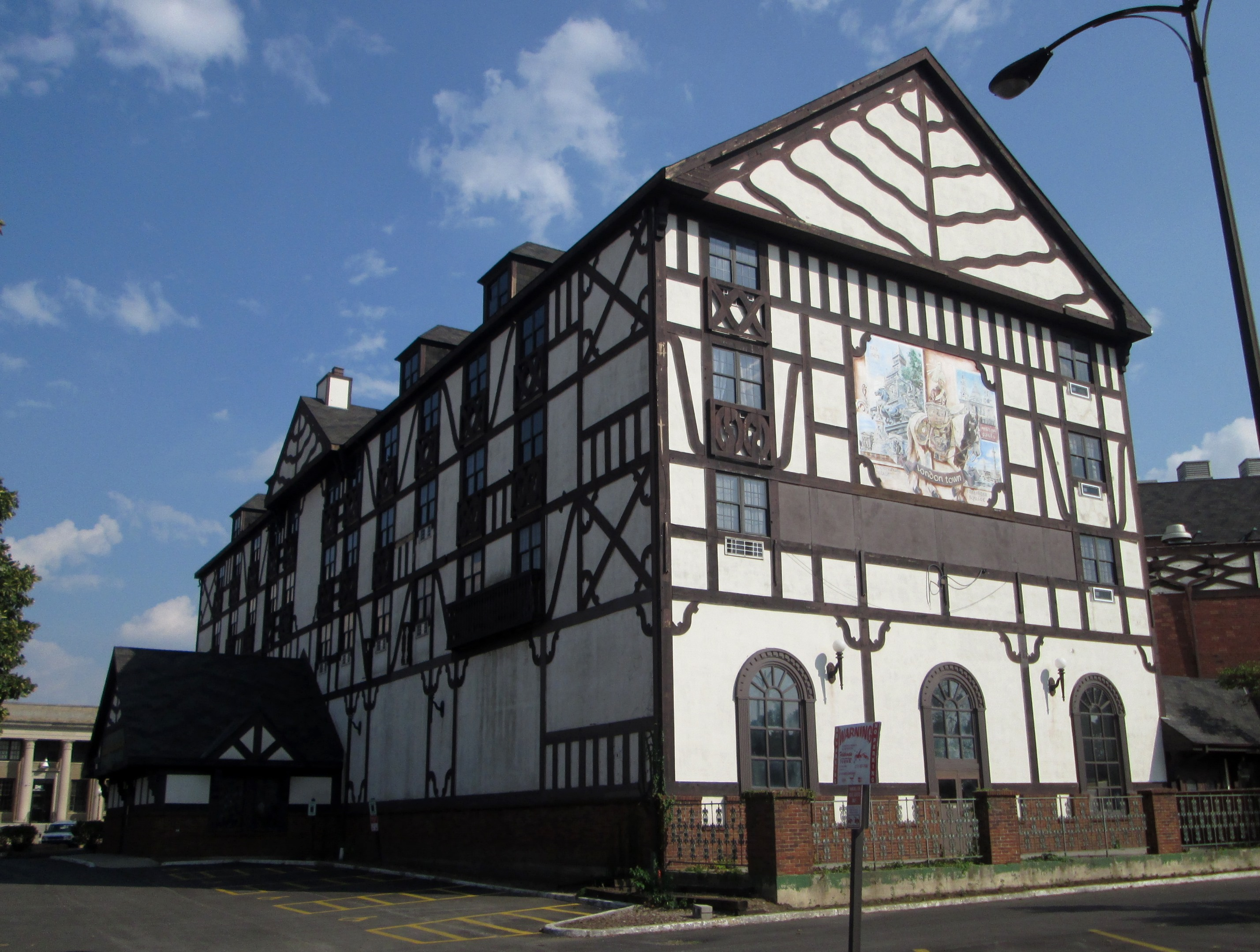
Urbana Lincoln Hotel

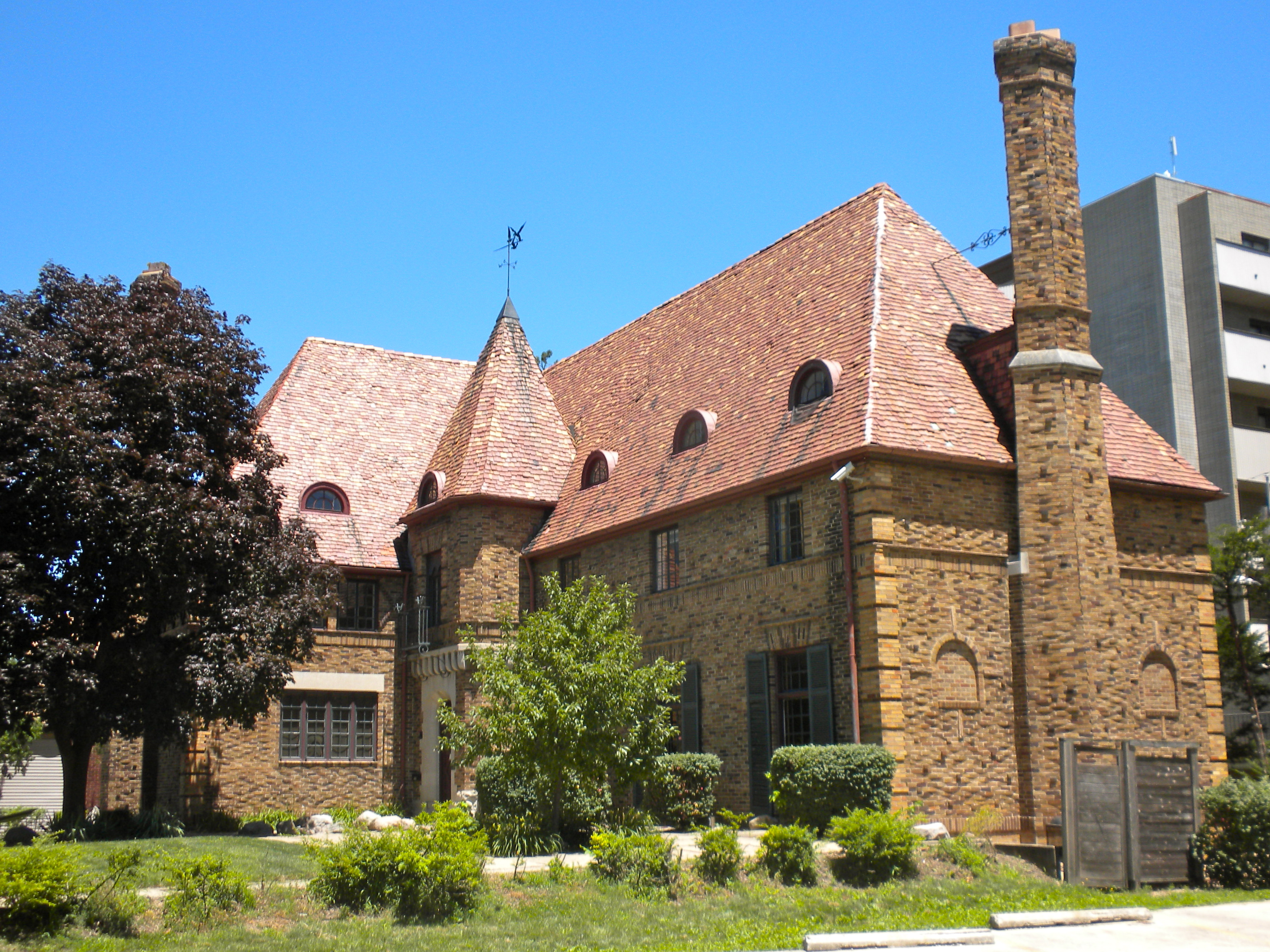
Alpha Rho Chi Fraternity House

Works include (with attribution):

- Alpha Rho Chi Fraternity House, Champaign
- Alpha Xi Delta Sorority Chapter House, Champaign
- Bloom High School, Chicago Heights
- Champaign County Courthouse, Urbana
- Clay County Courthouse
- Dixon High School
- Franklin County Jail
- Grundy County Courthouse, Morris
- Jay Helms House, Rockingham, North Carolina
- Illinois Traction Building, Champaign
- Linn County Courthouse (Iowa)
- Linn County Jail (Iowa)
- Marion County Courthouse (Illinois)
- Piatt County Courthouse, Monticello
- Urbana Free Library
- Urbana High School
- Urbana Lincoln Hotel
- Warren County Courthouse (Indiana)
