= Alpha Rho Chi Fraternity House (Champaign, Illinois) =

- U.S. National Register of Historic Places
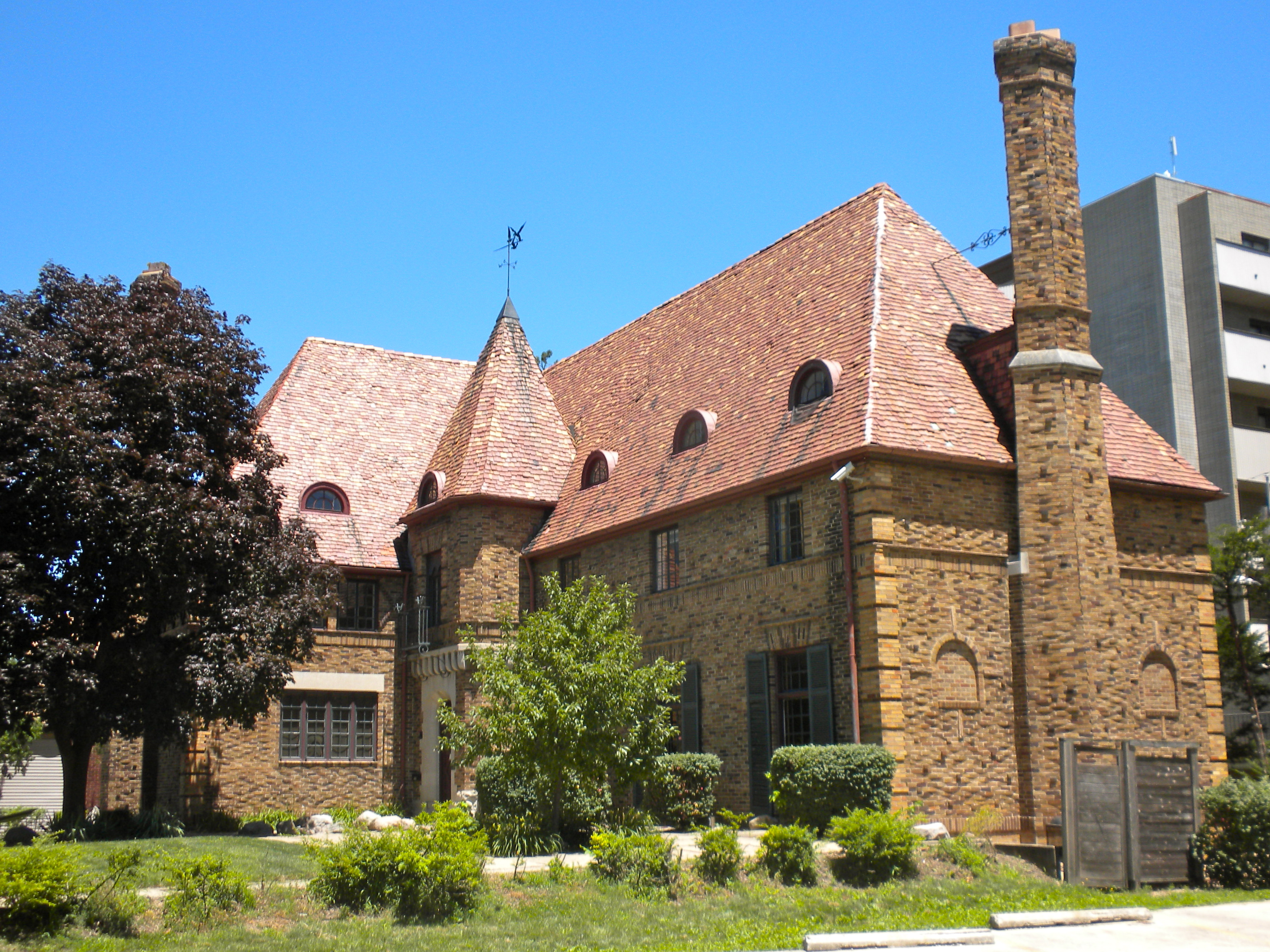

- Location within Illinois Location within the United States
- Location: 1108 S. First St., Champaign, Illinois
- Coordinates: 40°6′16″N 88°14′18″W
- Area: less than one acre
- Built: 1928
- Architect: Royer, Danley, & Smith
- Architectural style: French Eclectic
- MPS: Fraternity and Sorority Houses at the Urbana--Champaign Campus of the University of Illinois MPS
- NRHP reference No.: 97000460
- Added to NRHP: May 23, 1997

The Alpha Rho Chi Fraternity House is a historic fraternity house located at the University of Illinois at Urbana–Champaign in Champaign, Illinois. The house was added to the National Register of Historic Places on May 23, 1997.

== History ==
The Alpha Rho Chi Fraternity House is a historic fraternity house located at the University of Illinois at Urbana–Champaign in Champaign, Illinois. Its resident fraternity was one of the two founding chapters of Alpha Rho Chi; it formed as the Arcus Society in 1911 and became the Anthemios chapter of Alpha Rho Chi in 1914. The fraternity's members were all students in architecture or a related field; its name came from the first three letters in the Greek word for architecture, and the chapter's namesake was a famous Greek architect.

The house was added to the National Register of Historic Places on May 23, 1997.

== Architecture ==
The fraternity's house was designed in 1928 by local architecture firm Royer, Danley, and Smith and is a notable architectural work. The building blends elements of the French Eclectic and English Arts and Crafts styles; significant details include the corner tower over its arched entrance, brick chimneys at the narrow ends of its L-shaped plan, decorative brickwork, and a steep tile hip roof.

== See also ==
- North American fraternity and sorority housing
