= Callaway Nuclear Generating Station =

Nuclear power plant located in Callaway County, Missouri

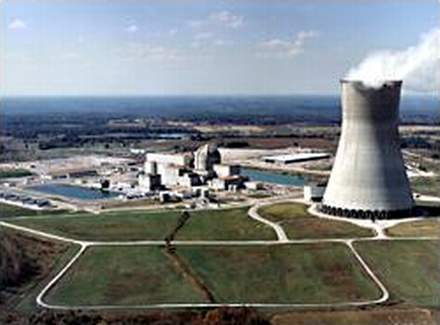
- Containment building (center) and cooling tower (right) at Callaway Plant (NRC picture).
- Official name: Callaway Plant, Callaway Energy Center
- Country: United States
- Location: Auxvasse Township, Callaway County, near Steedman, Missouri
- Coordinates: 38°45′42″N 91°46′48″W
- Status: Operational
- Construction began: September 1, 1975
- Commission date: December 19, 1984
- Construction cost: $5.919 billion (2007 USD)
- Owner: Ameren Missouri
- Operator: Ameren Missouri

Nuclear power station
- Reactor type: PWR
- Reactor supplier: Westinghouse
- Cooling towers: 1 × Natural Draft
- Cooling source: Missouri River
- Thermal capacity: 1 × 3565 MW_{th}

Power generation
- Units operational: 1 × 1215 MW
- Make and model: WH 4-loop (DRYAMB) SNUPPS
- Units cancelled: 1 × 1120 MW; 1 × 1600 MW US EPR
- Nameplate capacity: 1215 MW
- Capacity factor: 78.34% (2017); 87.70% (lifetime)
- Annual net output: 8338 GWh (2017)

External links
- Website: Callaway Energy Center
- Commons: Related media on Commons

The Callaway Plant is a nuclear power plant located in Callaway County, Missouri. The plant is Missouri's only nuclear power plant and is close to Fulton, Missouri. The 2,767 acres (1,120 ha) site began operations on December 19, 1984. It generates electricity from one 1,190-megawatt Westinghouse four-loop pressurized water reactor and a General Electric turbine-generator. The Ameren Corporation owns and operates the plant through its subsidiary Ameren Missouri. It is one of two Westinghouse reactors built on the "Standard Nuclear Unit Power Plant System" design, or SNUPPS, out of the six originally planned.

The plant produces 1,279 electrical megawatts (MWe) of net power. As of 2019, Callaway has completed five "breaker-to-breaker" runs—operating from one refueling to the next without ever being out of service. It is one of only 26 U.S. reactors to achieve such a feat, according to Ameren.

== History ==
In its early years, the reactor ran at high power densities with no outages for long periods.

During the reactor's ninth fueling cycle, which ran from 1996 to 1998, substantial crud growth led to a 15% axial offset of heat production, the greatest ever recorded. By 1998, attempts to dislodge the crud had the reactor operating at 30% below capacity. The reactor was even run at 70% below capacity for 24 hours in an attempt to dislodge crud, but that worsened the boron concentration in the crud (and thus axial offset) when power was raised. The economic cost from lost generation was roughly $20 million (equivalent to $39,500,000 in 2025). Extensive study was made of the Callaway crud deposits.

On November 19, 2005, its workers finished replacing all four steam generators in 63 days, 13 hours, a world record for a four-loop plant.

In 2014, the Nuclear Regulatory Commission tests found contaminated ground water near the site.

The plant experienced three unplanned shutdowns in 2020. On December 24, 2020, an electric fault on the non-safety main generator caused an extensive outage. Various components were replaced, inspected, and tested, and the reactor was restarted on August 2, 2021. Two days later, the main turbine generator was synchronized with the electrical grid and on August 8, the plant reached rated thermal power.

In 2022, Callaway produced 23% of Ameren's electricity.

=== Proposed Unit 2 and cancellation ===
On July 28, 2008, Ameren Missouri applied to the U.S. Nuclear Regulatory Commission (NRC) for a Combined Construction and Operating License (COL) to build a 1,600-MW Areva Evolutionary Power Reactor. Ameren sought to construct this second reactor in order to meet their projected increase in demand for electricity over the next decade.

In April 2009, Ameran withdrew its proposal. One stumbling block was a law that forbids utilities to charge customers for the interest accrued on a construction loan before a new plant produces electricity. The new nuclear reactor would have cost at least $6 billion.

In April 2012, Ameren Missouri and Westinghouse Electric Company announced their intent to seek federal funding for a new generation of nuclear reactors to be installed at the Callaway site. The U.S. Department of Energy could provide up to $452 million in research and development funds to Westinghouse. The new reactors would be smaller and, the companies claimed, safer in design than any currently operating. Ameren Missouri was to apply to license up five of the 225-megawatt reactors at the Callaway site, more than doubling its current electrical output.

In August 2015, a month after Ameren had announced plans to build solar energy plants in Missouri, all plans to expand nuclear-powered electricity generation at the site were scrapped.

== Facilities ==
=== Cooling tower ===
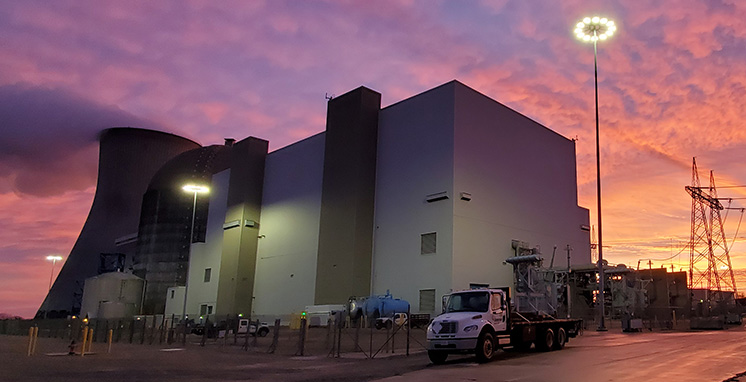
Callaway Nuclear Generating Station at sunrise in 2020, with cooling tower visible at left

The cooling tower at Callaway is 553 feet (169 m) tall. It is 430 feet wide at the base, and is constructed from reinforced concrete. It cools about 585,000 US gallons (2,210,000 L; 487,000 imp gal) of water per minute when the plant is operating at full capacity; about 15,000 US gallons (57,000 L; 12,000 imp gal) of water per minute are lost out the top from evaporation. Another 5,000 US gallons (19,000 L; 4,200 imp gal) of water are sent to the Missouri River as "blowdown" to flush solids from the cooling tower basin. All water lost through evaporation or blowdown is replaced with water from the river, located five miles from the plant. The temperature of the water going into the cooling tower is 125 °F (52 °C), and the tower cools it to 95 °F (35 °C). The tower is designed such that if it were to somehow topple over completely intact, it would not damage any of the critical plant structures.

== Risks ==
=== Surrounding population ===
The Nuclear Regulatory Commission defines two emergency planning zones around nuclear power plants: a plume exposure pathway zone with a radius of 10 miles (16 km), concerned primarily with exposure to, and inhalation of, airborne radioactive contamination; and an ingestion pathway zone of about 50 miles (80 km), concerned primarily with ingestion of food and liquid contaminated by radioactivity.

The 2010 population within 10 miles (16 km) of Callaway was 10,092, an increase of 3.8 percent in a decade, according to an analysis of U.S. Census data for msnbc.com. The 2010 population within 50 miles (80 km) was 546,292, an increase of 15.0 percent since 2000. Cities within 50 miles include Fulton (11 miles to city center), Jefferson City (26 miles to city center), and Columbia (32 miles to city center).

=== Seismic risk ===
In August 2010, the Nuclear Regulatory Commission's estimated that the annual chance that an earthquake might damage the core at Callaway was 1 in 500,000, the lowest probability of any U.S. reactor.

== Electricity production ==
Generation (MWh) of Callaway Nuclear Generating Station
Year	Jan	Feb	Mar	Apr	May	Jun	Jul	Aug	Sep	Oct	Nov	Dec	Annual (Total)
2001	864,162	778,452	698,802	112,310	170,080	818,314	841,436	843,774	823,728	858,914	832,611	741,657	8,384,240
2002	847,236	334,598	844,638	828,117	823,474	816,017	838,569	840,751	819,190	588,220	67,577	741,242	8,389,629
2003	872,905	784,805	584,814	773,625	863,342	831,288	851,080	851,040	829,346	749,941	835,235	872,168	9,699,589
2004	818,598	377,137	869,077	228,218	-11,505	410,640	860,440	859,831	835,856	868,542	839,923	873,936	7,830,693
2005	800,781	787,769	699,479	773,972	864,248	757,093	852,463	853,734	436,542	-5,959	292,891	917,564	8,030,577
2006	916,311	831,307	917,371	879,982	430,989	766,219	888,413	891,120	878,572	911,654	885,967	918,755	10,116,660
2007	921,372	832,148	773,355	17,380	592,863	866,741	894,646	888,978	869,464	906,068	888,687	920,253	9,371,955
2008	919,838	861,555	897,258	880,210	904,505	861,545	878,976	889,454	869,370	281,840	579,384	554,694	9,378,629
2009	928,441	535,798	826,689	796,254	909,950	836,422	898,752	899,588	878,322	918,753	891,471	926,676	10,247,116
2010	927,876	836,896	918,163	464,014	-15,004	490,633	889,828	890,830	872,584	908,084	889,371	922,758	8,996,033
2011	897,729	830,541	913,563	882,535	905,823	865,617	885,426	891,052	856,251	405,064	115,685	922,037	9,371,323
2012	921,614	861,869	911,230	875,067	901,235	867,320	887,705	896,292	874,142	911,923	889,995	919,937	10,718,329
2013	922,003	833,927	894,008	173,068	34,149	869,706	719,609	320,343	872,034	912,338	892,149	923,769	8,367,103
2014	924,177	834,469	919,722	883,867	903,051	864,887	891,422	889,432	871,396	287,811	210,125	795,997	9,276,356
2015	911,205	752,567	915,541	881,151	903,267	863,518	784,224	838,780	870,449	912,558	887,442	919,380	10,440,082
2016	922,994	862,506	879,028	18,165	538,222	865,798	888,624	893,101	848,513	905,695	883,658	923,875	9,430,179
2017	908,108	827,888	870,773	881,507	906,309	785,120	889,975	897,148	864,495	155,902	-11,834	328,736	8,304,127
2018	919,276	828,913	904,403	884,652	893,872	859,057	887,365	887,687	863,309	906,833	893,292	926,620	10,655,279
2019	911,445	813,601	912,224	-6,761	320,245	865,191	888,716	902,124	855,023	913,456	892,828	921,771	9,189,863
2020	937,229	844,721	885,725	777,262	907,007	862,345	887,515	892,758	748,775	0	0	-1,217	7,742,120
2021	-29,677	0	0	0	0	0	0	742,905	868,611	905,856	889,061	915,677	4,292,433
2022	800,111	831,706	916,291	79,882	11,462	854,993	889,796	892,284	872,105	913,732	891,085	921,322	7,062,362
2023	923,026	832,359	917,636	788,763	629,535	869,209	890,611	891,884	837,217	0	679,782	919,722	9,179,744
2024	924,535	652,086	920,500	883,381	904,397	864,887	890,370	893,974	871,405	909,559	887,341	923,349	10,525,784
2025	917,559	839,632	818,442	0	0	0	661,130	895,345	866,582	908,244	325,615	883,612	7,116,161
2026	923,905	831,349	912,298	879,094	906,157	865,289	889,020	892,366					--

== See also ==
- List of power stations in Missouri
