= SNUPPS =

Nuclear reactor design

SNUPPS is an acronym standing for Standardized Nuclear Unit Power Plant System. It refers to a 4-loop PWR reactor design produced by Westinghouse in the 1970s. The design was developed for four USA utilities, and plants were built at Callaway and Wolf Creek. The UK plant at Sizewell B was also based on SNUPPS but with significant modifications, such as a passive Emergency Boration System.
