= Marion County Courthouse (Illinois) =

Local government building in the United States

Coordinates: 38°37′39″N 88°56′42″W

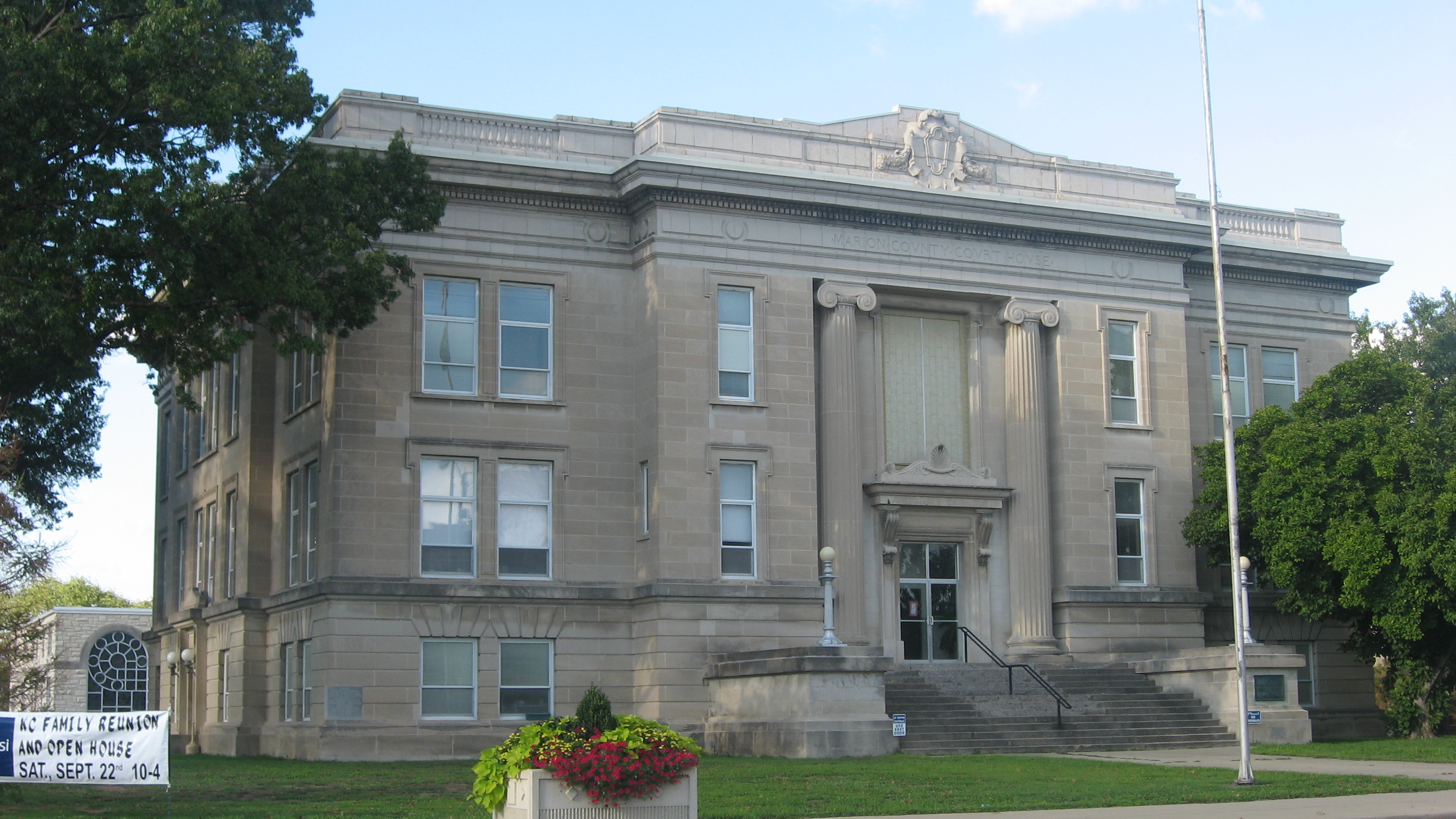
Front and part of the western side

The Marion County Courthouse is a government building in Salem, the county seat of Marion County, Illinois, United States. Built in 1910, it is the fourth courthouse in the county's history.

== Former courthouses ==
Marion County was formed in 1823 from what had been the northern part of Jefferson County, and the land now occupied by central Salem was donated for the express purpose of founding a county seat, with a lot reserved for courthouse construction. At the second meeting of the county court, a contract was signed with Aaron Hicks to build a courthouse at a cost of $499. Measuring 20 by 30 feet (6.1 m × 9.1 m), this 1½-story log building was pierced with two doors but no windows, and its interior was partitioned into two. The upper half story served as a jail to hold those awaiting trial. Hicks finished the building within nine months, and it served until 1837. After the county stopped using it, the courthouse became a church building for local Methodists, and local Baptists also used the building for several years.

The original courthouse's upper floor was replaced by a new jail between 1830 and 1832. In 1836, the county board ordered the construction of a new courthouse at a cost of $655, but contractor Mark Tully failed to complete it (the reason is unrecorded, but the county's refusal to penalize him indicates that he had good reason), and Nathaniel Adams instead oversaw construction. Two stories tall with a hip roof, and measuring 38 by 40 feet (12 m × 12 m), the wooden courthouse was pierced with several windows and doors on its various sides, including a second-floor doorway that opened onto a balcony above the main entrance. Adams employed high-quality construction methods, allowing it to stand for several decades; after it ceased to be used as a courthouse, Charles Mills bought the building and moved it elsewhere to serve as his residence.

Marion County's third courthouse was ordered in July 1857, and Joseph Miller began construction in the following year. However, Miller was found to be using poor-quality materials, and county officials were able to annul the contract and obtain an award of damages, although Miller's poverty prevented the county from recovering any significant amount. His contract was given to the firm of Moore and Morrow, and at a cost of $35,000 the new building opened in 1860. Its design featured Neoclassical elements on the second story, including pilasters and a pair of columns supporting a pediment the width of the facade. This building remained in use into the twentieth century; Brinkerhoff's History of Marion County Illinois (1909) reported:

"It is still the courthouse for Marion county, and though out of style, is yet a substantial building, and but that modern conveniences and comforts are lacking, would stand a century.

== Current courthouse ==
Joseph Royer designed the present courthouse, which was built starting in 1910. Featuring a form of Neoclassical architecture newer than its predecessor, the courthouse is a two-story stone building with Ionic columns set on both sides of the main entrance. These doors sit at the top of a wide flight of stairs with elements such as ornamental lamps at the sides. Rectangular windows, both single and paired, are set in various parts of the facade. The exterior features ashlar blocks sitting atop a raised basement, with plain string courses at various levels near the basement's summit and under the edge of the roof.

Near the courthouse sits a two-story office building, which was constructed in 1978 according to a design by Field, Goldman, and Magee. The same firm oversaw the renovation of the existing courthouse in the same year.
