= Crud (radioactive waste) =

Deposit that forms on nuclear fuel

In a nuclear reactor, crud is a thin layer of irradiated corrosion surface deposits that grows on nuclear fuel cladding. The term may also refer more generally to any irradiated corrosion particle in a reactor, included that dissolved into coolant, from which fuel rod crud accumulates. Various backronyms have been invented to explain the origin of the word, but they are false etymologies. Crud accumulation must be accounted for in reactor designs, as crud accumulation changes reactor characteristics such as neutron absorption and heat transfer.

== Etymology ==
Crud likely derives from the older Welsh cryd, referring to fever or disease. Crud was used a slang term by at least the early 1930s to refer to dirtiness or filth. World War II soldiers referred to unknown illnesses as "the crud." Workers in the Manhattan Project were using the term in much the original sense by at least 1944, when a manual at the Hanford Engineer Works referred to a chemical process to leach "crud" out of a solution.

However, US Navy Commander Edwin E. Kintner (who would later lead cleanup of the Three Mile Island accident) was not aware of the earlier and general use of crud. Kintner reasoned in a 1959 essay that the term had originated from a 1953 experiment which had sent S1W reactor assemblies to Chalk River Laboratories. After irradiation, the assemblies had grown a layer of unexplained deposits. Kintner thus thought the term came from Chalk River unidentified deposits. However, Kintner's etymology was erroneous, as the term was already in wide use among nuclear workers by 1953. Papers as recently as 2025 have used the term corrosion-related unidentified deposit.

== Crud growth in reactors ==
A zircalloy nuclear fuel rod showing crud growth after time in a reactor. The sections coated in 0.1 μm of amorphous carbon have no crud growth, showing the original shiny texture of the unfouled zircalloy.

Especially in pressurized water reactors, the coolant cycle is subject to extreme processes. The water reaches temperatures above 286 °C (547 °F) (beyond atmospheric boiling temperatures), yet remains liquid for much of the cycle because it is kept at pressures over 14 MPa (140 bar). The water is kept borated to act as a neutron poison, which has the side effect of making the water acidic. The extreme environment encourages the corrosion of coolant loop components. While the fuel rods themselves are highly resistant to corrosion, downstream components such as piping and steam turbines (whose blades give them considerable surface area) are more susceptible to corrosion. Corrosion enters the cooling loop from downstream components, which eventually deposits on fuel rods as a thin layer of fouling.

The growth of crud on fuel assemblies can be dangerous in a reactor because it interferes with the smooth flow of coolant, changes heat transfer dynamics, and may induce structural weakness in the material.

Crud traps boron, leading to non-homogenous neutron absorption, and thus power asymmetry. Crud preferentially forms at high temperatures, and the top of a reactor is generally hotter than the bottom, so crud begins forming at the top of a reactor first. However, crud's boron trapping ability decreases local reaction rate due to neutron absorption, leading the top of the reactor to cool relative to the bottom. Thus, crud growth progressively causes higher temperatures in lower sections of a reactor, while decreasing the heat in higher sections of the reactor, known as axial offset. In a simulation of 180 days of reactor operation, crud deposition shifted the hottest point in the reactor down by 6.3% (about 21 cm (8.3 in)).

Crud deposition is directly linked to subcooled nucleate boiling. At lower temperatures, heat transfer from rod to coolant is via convection. But above a critical temperature, the fuel rods are sufficiently hotter than the coolant, and subcooled nucleate boiling begins. In a simulation, the critical temperature was slightly lower at the very top and bottom of the reactor, but was generally close to 347 °C (657 °F). Subcooled nucleate boiling creates very small bubbles, which encourages crud porosity, as well as providing a place for boron to drop out of solution as the coolant flashes to steam.

However, once subcooled nucleate boiling predominates throughout a reactor (which axial offset encourages), it has a slight moderating effect on crud deposition. In the same reactor simulation as above, starting with clean fuel rods, crud depths averaged 36 μm before subcooled nucleate boiling predominated, but decreased to 27 μm after such boiling was uniform. However, the concentration of trapped boron was not directly equal to depth, as prolonged subcooled nucleate boiling ultimately reduced the concentration of trapped boron.

Rods in the corners of a reactor, which are exposed to the lowest amount of neutron flux, do not accumulate significant quantities of crud. However, the boron on crud covered rods may affect the reactivity of even clean neighbor rods, such those that have just been replaced by refueling.

While downstream corrosion is promoted by the acidity of borated water, the microenvironment near the fuel rod surface is highly basic, due to the presence of lithium hydroxide.

While crud deposition is fastest at high temperatures, that does not mean that crud disperses into reactor water best at high temperatures. Some reactors have experienced bursts of particulate crud release into coolant during outage periods. That may lead to unexpected maintenance, as well as unexpectedly high radiation exposure for workers.

== Composition ==
Fuel rod crud is composed of a "porous-hydrophilic fouling layer deposited by nanoparticles" which exhibits "strong capillary wicking effects with the straight-through microchimneys."

== Prevention ==
Due to the composition and sheer size of downstream reactor components, it is not practical to entirely stop downstream corrosion. However, research in 2020 suggested that crud deposition might be stopped by coating fuel rods in a material with very low van der Waals forces, similar to the anti-scratch coatings used on iPhones. In particular, coatings which match the refractive index of the coolant are the most likely to succeed, at least for a reactor where van der Waals forces are the dominant interaction between fuel rod and the water based coolant.

== Examples ==
The Callaway Nuclear Generating Station experienced substantial crud growth during its ninth fueling cycle, which ran from 1996 to 1998. Unusually high crud accumulation led to a 15% axial offset, the greatest ever recorded. The reactor had previously run at very high power densities with no outages for long periods, but had to be ran at 30% below capacity by 1998, in an attempt to reduce crud accumulation. The reactor was run at 70% below capacity for 24 hours in an attempt to dislodge crud, but instead, that worsened the boron concentration in the crud (and thus axial offset) once power was raised. The economic cost from lost generation was roughly $20 million (equivalent to $39,500,000 in 2025). Extensive study was made of the Callaway crud deposits.

== See also ==
- Scram, another nuclear term with a false backronym
