= List of power stations in Missouri =

Sources of Missouri utility-scale electricity generation in gigawatt-hours, full-year 2025:
1. Coal: 45,941 (63.8%)
2. Natural gas: 9,458 (13.1%)
3. Nuclear: 7,116 (9.89%)
4. Wind: 6,500 (9.03%)
5. Solar: 1,589 (2.21%)
6. Hydroelectric: 1,023 (1.42%)
7. Petroleum: 255 (0.35%)
8. Biomass: 92 (0.13%)

This is a list of electricity-generating power stations in the U.S. state of Missouri. In 2024, Missouri had a total summer capacity of 20.4 GW through all of its power plants, and a net generation of 66,876 GWh. In 2025, the state's electrical energy generation mix was 63.8% coal, 13.1% natural gas, 9.9% nuclear, 9% wind, 2.2% solar, 1.4% hydroelectric, 0.4% petroleum, and 0.1% biomass. Small-scale solar, which includes customer-owned photovoltaic panels, delivered an additional net 800 GWh of energy to the state's electrical grid in 2025. This was about half the amount generated by Missouri's utility-scale photovoltaic plants.

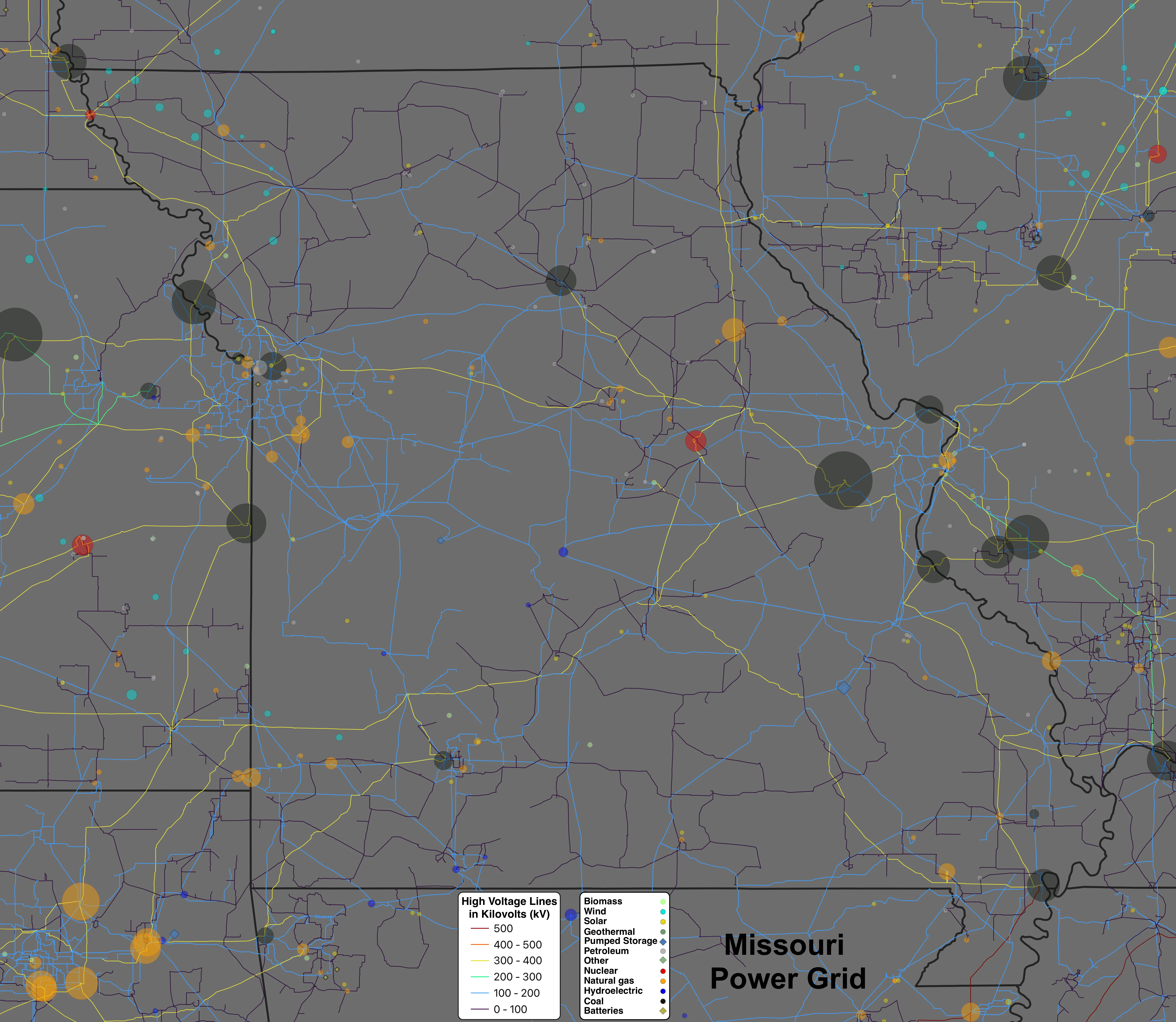
Missouri power grid

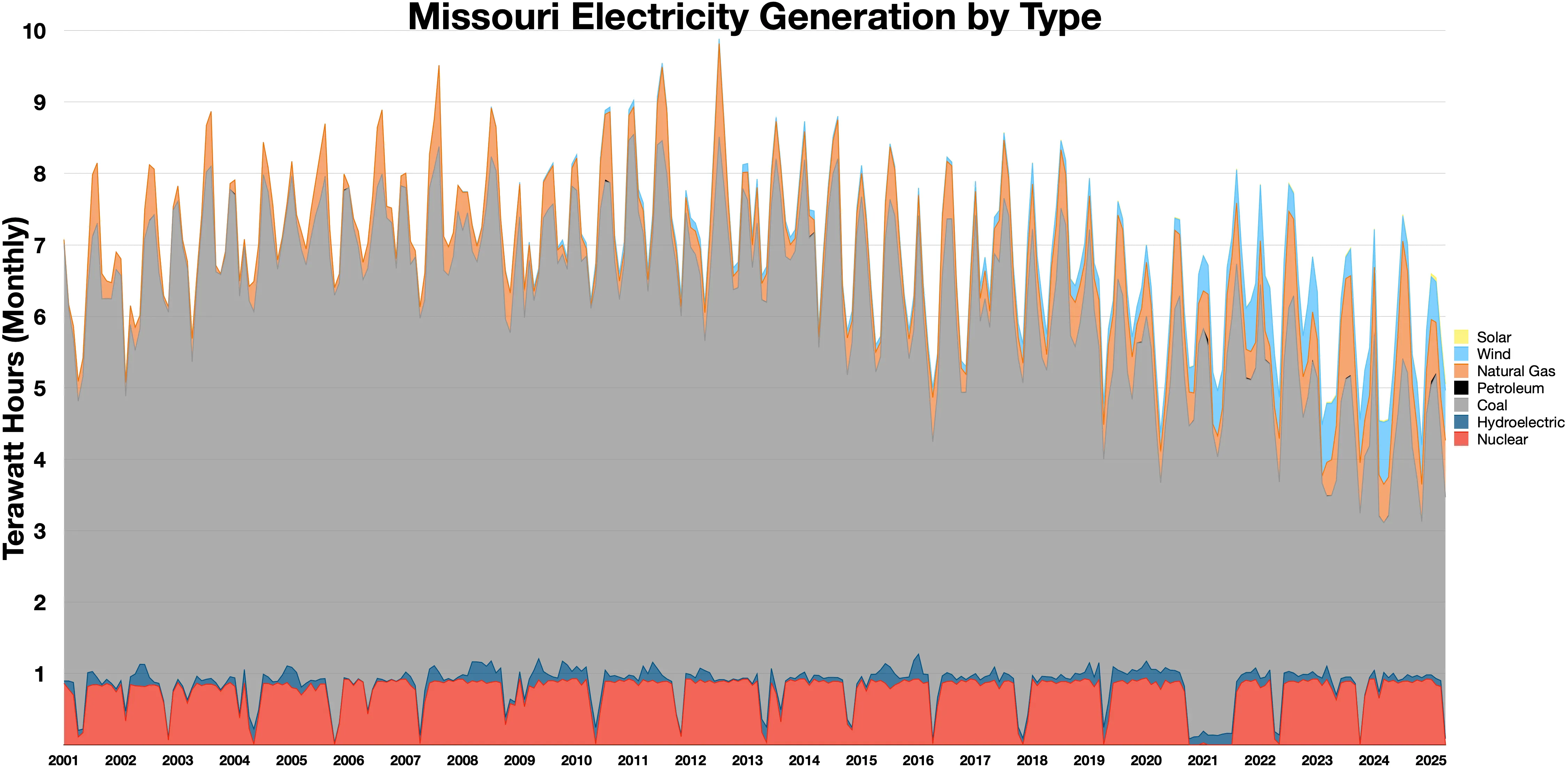
Missouri electricity generation by type

== Nuclear power stations ==
Plant	Owner	Net summer capacity (in MW)	Notes
Callaway (Callaway Nuclear Generating Station)	Ameren Corporation	1,193	Missouri's only nuclear power plant; began operations in 1984.

== Fossil-fuel power stations ==
Data from the U.S. Energy Information Administration.

=== Coal ===
According to the Sierra Club, as of 2016 there were a total of 16 coal-fired power plants in Missouri, a decrease from 2012, when there were 23. A Missouri City coal-fired power plant operated by Independence Power & Light closed in 2015; the facility was aging (60 years old) and could not comply with U.S. Environmental Protection Agency pollution regulations. In January 2015, Kansas City Power & Light Co. announced plans to stop burning coal at three of its generating units at Montrose Station, one at Lake Road Station, and two at Sibley Station. Coal burning would cease in phases (two units ceasing at the end of 2016, two at the end of 2019, and two at the end of 2021).

Plant	Owner	Net summer capacity (in MW)	Notes
Labadie	Ameren Corporation	2,371	
Iatan	Evergy	1,594	
Rush Island	Ameren Corporation	1,182	
New Madrid	Associated Electric Coop, Inc.	1,154	
Thomas Hill	Associated Electric Coop, Inc.	1,133	
Sioux	Ameren Corporation	974	
Hawthorn	Evergy	948	
Meramec	Ameren Corporation	938	Closed in December 2022.
Sibley Generating Station	Evergy	524	Closed in December 2018.
John Twitty Energy Center	City Utilities of Springfield	603	
Sikeston Power Station	Sikeston Board of Municipal Utilities.	235	

=== Natural gas ===
Plant	Owner	Net summer capacity (in MW)	Notes
Dogwood Energy Facility	Dogwood Power Management, LLC	616	
James River Power Station	City Utilities of Springfield	362.5	Formerly coal powered, converted to natural gas in 2015
Nodaway	Associated Electric Coop, Inc	207	

== Renewable power stations ==
The Missouri Department of Natural Resources reports that the state has nine pumped-storage hydroelectricity facilities and 20 conventional hydroelectric plants; the latter include the Bagnell Dam on the Osage River, which has a capacity of 176 MW, and the Table Rock Dam on the White River, close to Branson.

In 2014, Missouri's largest solar farm was located in Greene County, on a 57-acre plot owned by City Utilities, and is operated by Strata Solar. It generates a mean of 4.95 MW that contribute to City Utilities' transmission grid. Since 2017, the largest solar farm in Missouri is the Nixa Solar Farm and is owned by Gardner Capital and operated by MC Power Companies. It is located on 72 acres and can generate up to 7.92 MW for Nixa Utilities. In 2018 it supplied Nixa with about 9% of its energy needs.

== See also ==
- List of power stations in the United States
