= Iowa's 12th Senate district =

American legislative district

Iowa's 12th State Senate district
Senator
Amy Sinclair; R

The 12th District of the Iowa Senate is located in southern Iowa, and is currently composed of Adair, Clarke, Decatur, Lucas, Madison, and Wayne counties, as well as portions of Appanoose, Dallas, and Union counties.

== Current elected officials ==
Amy Sinclair is the senator currently representing the 12th District.

The area of the 12th District contains two Iowa House of Representatives districts:

- The 23rd District (represented by Ray Sorensen)
- The 24th District (represented by Sam Wengryn)

The district is also located in Iowa's 3rd congressional district, which is represented by U.S. Representative Zach Nunn.

== List of representatives ==
Representative	Party	Dates	Residence	Notes
Loring Wheeler	Whig	1846-1849	Clinton County	
William Leffingwell	Democrat	1850-1851	Clinton County	
Norman Everson	Whig	1852-1853	Washington, Iowa	
Hiram Cleaver	Whig	1854-1855	Keokuk, Iowa	
James Test	Democrat	1856-1857	Council Bluffs, Iowa	
William H. M. Pusey	Democrat	1858-1859	Council Bluffs, Iowa	
Daniel Anderson	Republican	1860-1861	Monroe County	
Warren Dungan	Republican	1862-1863	Chariton, Iowa	
Jacob Dixon	Republican	1864-1865	Wapello County	
Edward Stiles	Republican	1866-1867	Ottumwa, Iowa	
Abial Pierce	Republican	1868-1871	Jefferson County	
Moses McCoid	Republican	1872-1877	Fairfield, Iowa	
Sanford Harned	Democrat	1878-1881	Keokuk County	
Cassius Brown	Republican	1882-1885	Sigourney, Iowa	
Joseph Hutchison	Republican	1886-1887	Ottumwa, Iowa	
James Dooley	Republican	1888-1889	What Cheer, Iowa	
Joel Stewart	Democrat	1890-1893	Grinnell, Iowa	
John Riggen	Republican	1894-1897	What Cheer, Iowa	
William Robinson Lewis	Republican	1898-1901	Montezuma, Iowa	
John Tinley Brooks	Republican	1902-1906	Sigourney, Iowa	
Elbert Clark	Republican	1907-1910	Grinnell, Iowa	
Henry Spaulding	Republican	1911-1914	Grinnell, Iowa	
Charles Laffer	Republican	1915-1918	Sigourney, Iowa	
Theodore Cessna	Republican	1919-1926	Grinnell, Iowa	
Frank Beatty	Republican	1927-1934	Sigourney, Iowa	
Eugene Mason	Democrat	1935-1938	Poweshiek County	
John Edwin Talbott	Republican	1939-1942	Brooklyn, Iowa	
Luke Vittetoe	Republican	1943-1950	Sigourney, Iowa	
Wilbur Molison	Republican	1951-1958	Poweshiek County	
C. Edwin Gilmour	Democrat	1959-1962	Grinnell, Iowa	
		1963-1964		No senator from district 12 is listed on the Iowa Official Register for General Assembly 60. This is the combined result of redistricting and election cycles and affected multiple districts.
Stanley Heaberlin	Democrat	1965-1966	Pleasantville, Iowa	
Joseph Flatt	Republican	1967-1970	Winterset, Iowa	Resigned from office due to moving out of his district.
Glen Bortell	Republican	1970	Madison County	
Alden Erskine	Republican	1971-1972	Woodbury County	
Clifton Lamborn	Republican	1973-1976	Maquoketa, Iowa	
Merlin Hulse	Republican	1977-1982	Cedar County	
Ted J. Anderson	Democrat	1983-1984	Waterloo, Iowa	
Joy Corning	Republican	1985-1990	Cedar Falls, Iowa	
Harry Slife	Republican	1991-1994	Waterloo, Iowa	Senator Slife died in office in 1994.
Donald Redfern	Republican	1994-2002	Cedar Falls, Iowa	
Kathleen Rehberg	Republican	2003-2004	Buchanan County	
Brian Schoenjahn	Democrat	2005-2012	Arlington, Iowa	
Joni Ernst	Republican	2013-2014	Red Oak, Iowa	Senator Ernst was elected to the US Senate in 2014.
Mark Costello	Republican	2015-2022	Imogene, Iowa	
Amy Sinclair	Republican	2023-present	Wayne County	

== Historical district boundaries ==
Map	Description	Years effective	Notes
	Clinton County Scott County	1846-1851	From 1846 to 1857, district numbering was not utilized by the Iowa State Legislature. This convention was added with the passing of the 1857 Iowa Constitution. Numbering of districts pre-1857 is done as a matter of historic convenience.
	Louisa County Washington County	1852-1855	
	Audubon County Buena Vista County; Carroll County; Calhoun County; Cherokee County; Clay County; Crawford County; Dickinson County; Emmet County; Harrison County; Ida County; Lyon County; Monona County; O'Brien County; Osceola County; Palo Alto County; Plymouth County; Pocahontas County; Pottawattamie County; Sac County; Shelby County; Sioux County; Woodbury County	1856-1859	Lyon County would have been known as Buncombe County during this period.
	Lucas County Monroe County	1860-1863	
	Wapello County	1864-1867	
	Jefferson County	1868-1877	
	Keokuk County	1878-1883	
	Iowa County Keokuk County	1884-1885	
	Wapello County	1886-1887	
	Keokuk County Poweshiek County	1888-1962	
	Marion County Warren County	1963-1966	
	Adair County Cass County; Madison County	1967-1970	
	Woodbury County (partial)	1971-1972	In 1970, the Iowa Legislature passed an amendment to the Iowa Constitution setting forth the rules for legislative redistricting in order to abide by the rules established by the Reynolds v. Sims Supreme Court case. The first reapportionment map created by the Republican controlled legislature was deemed unconstitutional, but was still used for the 1970 election.
	Cedar County Jackson County (partial); Johnson County (partial); Jones County (partial); Scott County (partial)	1973-1982	
	Black Hawk County (partial)	1983-1992	
	Black Hawk County (partial)	1993-2002	
	Buchanan County Black Hawk County (partial): Barclay Township; Big Creek Township; Cedar Township; Fox Township; Poyner Township; Spring Township; Gilbertville; La Porte City; Clayton County; Delaware County (partial): Coffins Grove Township; Delaware Township; Elk Township; Honey Creek Township; Oneida Township; Richland Township; Delaware; Dundee; Earlville; Greeley; Masonville; Fayette County (partial): Fairfield Township; Illyria Township; Pleasant Valley Township; Putnam Township; Scott Township; Smithfield Township; Westfield Township; Arlington; Elgin; Fairbank; Fayette; Wadena	2003-2012	
	Fremont County Mills County; Montgomery County; Page County; Ringgold County; Taylor County	2013-2022	
	Adair County Appanoose County (partial): Independence Township; Johns Township; Lincoln Township; Plano; Clarke County; Dallas County (partial): Adams Township; Colfax Township; Union Township; De Soto; Earlham; Redfield; Decatur County; Lucas County; Union County (partial): Dodge Township; Lincoln Township; Jones Township; New Hope Township; Pleasant Township; Lorimor; Thayer	2023-present	

== See also ==
- Iowa General Assembly
- Iowa Senate
