= Iowa's 16th Senate district =

American legislative district

Iowa's 16th State Senate district
Senator
Renee Hardman; D–West Des Moines

The 16th District of the Iowa Senate is located in central Iowa, and is currently composed of part of Polk and Dallas counties.

== Current elected officials ==
The 16th District has been vacant since October 6, 2025, following the death of Senator Claire Celsi. Prior to her death, Celsi had represented the district since 2023. In December 2025, a special election was held. Democrat Renee Hardman won the election.

The area of the 16th District contains two Iowa House of Representatives districts:

- The 31st District (represented by Mary Lee Madison)
- The 32nd District (represented by Jennifer Konfrst)

The district is also located in Iowa's 3rd congressional district, which is represented by Zach Nunn.

== List of representatives ==
Representative	Party	Dates	Residence	Notes
Eli Snow Wing	Democrat	1852-1853	Davenport, Iowa	
Ambrose Cowperthwaite Fulton	Whig	1854-1855	Davenport, Iowa	
William A. Loughridge	Republican	1856-1859	Oskaloosa, Iowa	
Oliver P. Sherraden	Republican	1860-1861	Richland, Iowa	
Issac Pearl Teter	Republican	1862-1863	Sigourney, Iowa	
John Ferguson McJunkin	Republican	1864-1867	Washington County, Iowa	
John A. Parvin	Republican	1868-1869	Muscatine, Iowa	
Samuel McNutt	Republican	1870-1873	Muscatine, Iowa	
Henry Thornburg	Anti-Monopoly	1874-1875	Dallas County, Iowa	
Henry Thornburg	Republican	1876-1877	Dallas County, Iowa	
John L. McCormack	Democrat	1878-1879	Knoxville, Iowa	
James F. Greenlee	Republican	1880-1883	Marion County, Iowa	
Eli Wilkin	Republican	1884-1887	Winterset, Iowa	
Richard Price	Republican	1888-1891	Winterset, Iowa	
Alva Lysander Hager	Republican	1892	Greenfield, Iowa	Elected to the U.S. House of Representatives is 1892.
Lucien Moody Kilburn	Republican	1893-1899	Greenfield, Iowa	
James Judson Crossley	Republican	1900-1908	Winterset, Iowa	
Arthur Criag Savage	Republican	1909-1916	Adair, Iowa	
Edward McMurray Smith	Republican	1917-1924	Winterset, Iowa	
John N. Langfitt	Republican	1925-1932	Adair, Iowa	Died in office in 1932.
Ora E. Husted	Republican	1933-1940	Winterset, Iowa	
Harry Samuel Love	Republican	1941-1946	Bridgewater, Iowa	Resigned before the end of his term to accept appointment to the State Board of Social Welfare.
John Lyle Musmaker	Republican	1947-1948	Greenfield, Iowa	
Raymond R. Gillespie	Democrat	1949-1952	Winterset, Iowa	
Lorin B. Sayre	Republican	1953-1956	Winterset, Iowa	
Raymond R. Gillespie	Democrat	1957-1960	Winterset, Iowa	Died in office in 1960.
Joseph B. Flatt	Republican	1961-1964	Winterset, Iowa	
David M. Stanley	Republican	1965-1966	Muscatine, Iowa	
Roger John Shaff	Republican	1967-1970	Clinton, Iowa	
James A. Potgeter	Republican	1971-1972	Steamboat Rock, Iowa	
James V. Gallagher	Democrat	1973-1982	Vail, Iowa	
Dale L. Tieden	Republican	1983-1992	Elkader, Iowa	
Lyle E. Zieman	Republican	1993-2000	Postville, Iowa	
Mark Zieman	Republican	2001-2002	Postville, Iowa	
Julie M. Hosch	Republican	2003-2004	Cascade, Iowa	
Tom Hancock	Democrat	2005-2012	Dubuque, Iowa	
Dick L. Dearden	Democrat	2013-2016	Des Moines, Iowa	
Nate Boulton	Democrat	2017-2022	Des Moines, Iowa	
Claire Celsi	Democrat	2023-2025	Des Moines, Iowa	
Renee Hardman	Democrat	2025-Present	West Des Moines, Iowa	

== Historical District Boundaries ==
Map	Description	Years effective	Notes
	Scott County	1852-1855	From 1846 to 1857, district numbering was not utilized by the Iowa State Legislature. This convention was added with the passing of the 1857 Iowa Constitution. Numbering of districts pre-1857 is done as a matter of historic convenience.
	Mahaska County	1856-1859	
	Keokuk County	1860-1863	
	Washington County	1864-1867	
	Muscatine County	1868-1873	
	Dallas County Madison County	1874-1877	
	Marion County	1878-1883	
	Madison County Warren County	1884-1887	
	Adair County Madison County	1888-1962	
	Cedar County Muscatine County	1963-1966	
	Clinton County	1967-1970	
	Franklin County (partial) Hamilton County; Hardin County; Wright County (partial)	1971-1972	In 1970, the Iowa Legislature passed an amendment to the Iowa Constitution setting forth the rules for legislative redistricting in order to abide by the rules established by the Reynolds v. Sims Supreme Court case. The first reapportionment map created by the Republican controlled legislature was deemed unconstitutional, but was still used for the 1970 election.
	Benton County (partial) Black Hawk County (partial); Buchanan County; Linn County (partial); Tama County (partial)	1973-1982	
	Allamakee County Clayton County; Winneshiek County	1983-1992	
	Allamakee County Clayton County; Fayette County (partial); Winneshiek County (partial)	1993-2002	
	Delaware County (partial): Excluding; Coffins Grove Township; Delaware Township; Elk Township; Honey Creek Township; Oneida Township; Richland Township; Delaware; Dundee; Earlville; Edgewood; Greeley; Masonville; Dubuque County (partial): Excluding; Dubuque Township (partial); Portions of Dubuque Township north of the city of Dubuque are part of District 16.; Table Mound Township; Washington Township; Dubuque; Jones County	2003-2012	
	Polk County (partial): Des Moines (partial); Consisting primarily of the central city north and east of the Des Moines River; Pleasant Hill	2013-2022	
	Dallas County (partial): Northeasternmost corner of the county, bounded by Jordan Creek Pkwy and Ashworth Rd; Polk County (partial): Bloomfield Township (partial); Section West of IA-28 only; Walnut Township; Clive (partial); Region south of US-6; Windsor Heights		

== Recent election results from statewide races ==
Year	Office	Results
2008	President	Obama 52–47%
2012	President	Obama 51–49%
2016	President	Clinton 51–41%
2016	Senate	Grassley 54–42%
2018	Governor	Hubbell 57–41%
2018	Attorney General	Miller 79–21%
2018	Secretary of State	DeJear 53–44%
2018	Treasurer	Fitzgerald 65–33%
2018	Auditor	Sand 57–40%
2020	President	Biden 59–39%
2020	Senate	Greenfield 56–42%
2022	Senate	Franken 57–43%
2022	Governor	DeJear 54–44%
2022	Attorney General	Miller 63–37%
2022	Secretary of State	Miller 51–49%
2022	Treasurer	Fitzgerald 64–36%
2022	Auditor	Sand 64–36%
2024	President	Harris 58–40%

== See also ==
- Iowa General Assembly
- Iowa Senate
