= Lodomillo Township, Clayton County, Iowa =

Township in Iowa, US

Lodomillo Township
- Township
- Location in Clayton County
- Coordinates: 42°41′05″N 091°25′41″W
- Country: United States
- State: Iowa
- County: Clayton

Area
  - Total: 36.50 sq mi (94.54 km^{2})
  - Land: 36.49 sq mi (94.52 km^{2})
  - Water: 0.0077 sq mi (0.02 km^{2}) 0.02%
- Elevation: 1,161 ft (354 m)

Population (2000)
  - Total: 719
  - Density: 20/sq mi (7.6/km^{2})
- GNIS feature ID: 0468294

Lodomillo Township is a township in Clayton County, Iowa, United States. As of the 2000 census, its population was 719.

== History ==
The origin of the name Lodomillo is unclear. It might mean "load a mill" or "load of watermelons".

== Geography ==
Lodomillo Township covers an area of 36.5 square miles (95 km^{2}).

=== Cities and towns ===
- Edgewood (north half)

Edgewood is divided by Iowa Highway 3; the south half of the town is in Honey Creek Township, Delaware County.

=== Adjacent townships ===
- Cox Creek Township (north)
- Volga Township (northeast)
- Elk Township (east)
- Elk Township, Delaware County (southeast)
- Honey Creek Township, Delaware County (south)
- Richland Township, Delaware County (southwest)
- Cass Township (west)
- Sperry Township (northwest)

=== Cemeteries ===
According to the USGS, the township contains two cemeteries: Green Hill and Noble.

=== Major highways ===
- Iowa Highway 3
- Iowa Highway 13 in the southwest corner of the township
