= Clermont Township, Fayette County, Iowa =

Clermont Township
- Township
- Location in Fayette County
- Coordinates: 43°02′14″N 91°39′45″W
- Country: United States
- State: Iowa
- County: Fayette

Area
  - Total: 36.34 sq mi (94.11 km^{2})
  - Land: 36.34 sq mi (94.11 km^{2})
  - Water: 0 sq mi (0 km^{2}) 0%
- Elevation: 1,037 ft (316 m)

Population (2010)
  - Total: 894
  - Density: 24.6/sq mi (9.50/km^{2})
- Time zone: UTC-6 (CST)
  - Summer (DST): UTC-5 (CDT)
- ZIP codes: 52133, 52135, 52162
- GNIS feature ID: 0467622

Clermont Township is one of twenty townships in Fayette County, Iowa, United States. As of the 2010 census, its population was 894.

== Geography ==
According to the United States Census Bureau, Clermont Township covers an area of 36.34 square miles (94.11 square kilometers).

=== Cities, towns, villages ===
- Clermont

=== Adjacent townships ===
- Bloomfield Township, Winneshiek County (north)
- Post Township, Allamakee County (northeast)
- Grand Meadow Township, Clayton County (east)
- Marion Township, Clayton County (southeast)
- Pleasant Valley Township (south)
- Union Township (southwest)
- Dover Township (west)

=== Cemeteries ===
The township contains Saint Peters Cemetery.

=== Major highways ===
- U.S. Route 18

=== Airports and landing strips ===
- Dale Delight Airport

== School districts ==
- Postville Community School District
- North Fayette Valley Community School District

== Political districts ==
- Iowa's 1st congressional district
- State House District 18
- State Senate District 9
