= Colony Township, Delaware County, Iowa =

Colony Township
- Township
- Location in Delaware County
- Coordinates: 42°36′24″N 91°11′14″W
- Country: United States
- State: Iowa
- County: Delaware

Area
  - Total: 36 sq mi (94 km^{2})
  - Land: 36.29 sq mi (93.98 km^{2})
  - Water: 0.0077 sq mi (0.02 km^{2}) 0.02%
- Elevation: 1,001 ft (305 m)

Population (2000)
  - Total: 863
  - Density: 24/sq mi (9.2/km^{2})
- GNIS feature ID: 0467641

Colony Township is a township in Delaware County, Iowa, United States. As of the 2000 census, its population was 863.

== Geography ==
Colony Township covers an area of 36.29 square miles (94 square kilometers); of this, 0.01 square miles (0.02 square kilometers) or 0.02 percent is water.

=== Cities and towns ===
- Colesburg

=== Unincorporated towns ===
- Holy Cross

(This list is based on USGS data and may include former settlements.)

=== Adjacent townships ===
- Mallory Township, Clayton County (north)
- Millville Township, Clayton County (northeast)
- Liberty Township, Dubuque County (east)
- New Wine Township, Dubuque County (southeast)
- Bremen Township (south)
- Oneida Township (southwest)
- Elk Township (west)
- Elk Township, Clayton County (northwest)

=== Cemeteries ===
The township contains four cemeteries: Oak Hill, Platt, Saint Patrick and Zion.
