= Millville Township, Clayton County, Iowa =

Township in Iowa, US

Millville Township
- Township
- Location in Clayton County
- Coordinates: 42°41′30″N 091°04′27″W
- Country: United States
- State: Iowa
- County: Clayton

Area
  - Total: 35.26 sq mi (91.32 km^{2})
  - Land: 34.24 sq mi (88.67 km^{2})
  - Water: 1.02 sq mi (2.64 km^{2}) 2.89%
- Elevation: 650 ft (198 m)

Population (2000)
  - Total: 471
  - Density: 14/sq mi (5.3/km^{2})
- GNIS feature ID: 0468384

Millville Township is a township in Clayton County, Iowa, United States. As of the 2000 census, its population was 471.

== History ==
Millville Township is named from the mill constructed there about 1833.

== Geography ==
Millville Township covers an area of 35.26 square miles (91.3 km^{2}) and contains one incorporated settlement, Millville. Neighboring townships include Mallory Township, Jefferson Township, and Buena Vista Township. According to the USGS, it contains six cemeteries: Bierer, Friedlein, Goshen, Graham, Griffith and Redman.

The stream of Little Turkey River runs through this township.
