= Fairfield Township, Fayette County, Iowa =

Fairfield Township
- Township
- Location in Fayette County
- Coordinates: 42°46′25″N 91°40′10″W
- Country: United States
- State: Iowa
- County: Fayette

Area
  - Total: 36 sq mi (94 km^{2})
  - Land: 36 sq mi (94 km^{2})
  - Water: 0 sq mi (0 km^{2}) 0%
- Elevation: 1,171 ft (357 m)

Population (2010)
  - Total: 652
  - Density: 18/sq mi (6.9/km^{2})
- Time zone: UTC-6 (CST)
  - Summer (DST): UTC-5 (CDT)
- ZIP codes: 50606, 52142, 52169
- GNIS feature ID: 0467810

Fairfield Township is one of twenty townships in Fayette County, Iowa, United States. As of the 2010 census, its population was 652.

== Geography ==
According to the United States Census Bureau, Fairfield Township covers an area of 36.3 square miles (94 square kilometers).

=== Cities, towns, villages ===
- Arlington

=== Unincorporated towns ===
- Taylorsville at 42.767206°N 91.64682°W

(This list is based on USGS data and may include former settlements.)

=== Adjacent townships ===
- Illyria Township (north)
- Highland Township, Clayton County (northeast)
- Sperry Township, Clayton County (east)
- Cass Township, Clayton County (southeast)
- Putnam Township (south)
- Scott Township (southwest)
- Smithfield Township (west)
- Westfield Township (northwest)

=== Cemeteries ===
The township contains these three cemeteries: Arlington, Corn Hill and Taylorville.

=== Major highways ===
- Iowa Highway 187

=== Landmarks ===
- Brush Creek Canyon State Park

== School districts ==
- North Fayette Valley Community School District
- Starmont Community School District

== Political districts ==
- Iowa's 1st congressional district
- State House District 24
- State Senate District 12
