= Communia, Iowa =

- Unincorporated community
- Location within Iowa Location within the United States
- Country: United States
- State: Iowa
- County: Clayton
- Elevation: 823 ft (251 m)
- Time zone: UTC-6 (Central (CST))
  - Summer (DST): UTC-5 (CDT)
- Area code: 563
- GNIS feature ID: 464505

Communia is an unincorporated community located in Clayton County, Iowa, United States, in the south half of section 8, Volga Township. The area was established as a German colony in 1847.

== History ==
In early 1847 a group of pioneers, consisting of nine Germans (among them, Heinrich Koch) and one Frenchman, met in St. Louis to set off for new land under the direction of Joseph Venus. The group traveled north by steamer to the area of Dubuque. After buying necessary provisions, the group left on foot with only one wagon and three oxen to the northwestern area of Volga Township.

After one night of rest the men immediately began building and organizing the area. During the first year, three log houses and one blacksmith shop were built. The men welcomed anyone who wished to join, no matter how much or how little they contributed, and over the next few years the colony began to flourish.

The community prided themselves for the peaceful and welcoming environment they had created. The colony maintained a good relationship with the large Native American population and regularly traded with other emerging colonies within the area.

In 1851, the German communist Wilhelm Weitling came to Communia and became its administrator.

Despite the great success of the colony, the area dissolved in 1858 after much of the land and property was sold off by various families. The population of Communia was just 12 in 1902. The population was again 12 in 1940.
