= Illyria Township, Fayette County, Iowa =

Illyria Township
- Township
- Location in Fayette County
- Coordinates: 42°52′15″N 91°39′56″W
- Country: United States
- State: Iowa
- County: Fayette

Area
  - Total: 36.85 sq mi (95.45 km^{2})
  - Land: 36.85 sq mi (95.44 km^{2})
  - Water: 0.0039 sq mi (0.01 km^{2}) 0.01%
- Elevation: 1,063 ft (324 m)

Population (2010)
  - Total: 532
  - Density: 14.4/sq mi (5.57/km^{2})
- Time zone: UTC-6 (CST)
  - Summer (DST): UTC-5 (CDT)
- ZIP codes: 50606, 52141, 52142, 52169, 52175
- GNIS feature ID: 0468063

Illyria Township is one of twenty townships in Fayette County, Iowa, United States. As of the 2010 census, its population was 532.

== Geography ==
According to the United States Census Bureau, Illyria Township covers an area of 36.86 square miles (95.45 square kilometers); of this, 36.85 square miles (95.44 square kilometers, 99.99 percent) is land and 0.01 square miles (0.01 square kilometers, 0.01 percent) is water.

=== Cities, towns, villages ===
- Wadena

=== Unincorporated towns ===
- Illyria at 42.898593°N 91.635152°W

(This list is based on USGS data and may include former settlements.)

=== Adjacent townships ===
- Pleasant Valley Township (north)
- Marion Township, Clayton County (northeast)
- Highland Township, Clayton County (east)
- Sperry Township, Clayton County (southeast)
- Fairfield Township (south)
- Smithfield Township (southwest)
- Westfield Township (west)
- Union Township (northwest)

=== Cemeteries ===
The township contains these three cemeteries: Illyria-Highland, Saint Josephs and Wadena.

=== Major highways ===
- Iowa Highway 56

== School districts ==
- North Fayette Valley Community School District

== Political districts ==
- Iowa's 1st congressional district
- State House District 24
- State Senate District 12
