= Pleasant Valley Township, Fayette County, Iowa =

Pleasant Valley Township
- Township
- Location in Fayette County
- Coordinates: 42°56′58″N 91°40′09″W
- Country: United States
- State: Iowa
- County: Fayette

Area
  - Total: 36.68 sq mi (94.99 km^{2})
  - Land: 36.64 sq mi (94.89 km^{2})
  - Water: 0.039 sq mi (0.1 km^{2}) 0.11%
- Elevation: 1,033 ft (315 m)

Population (2010)
  - Total: 1,002
  - Density: 27.35/sq mi (10.56/km^{2})
- Time zone: UTC-6 (CST)
  - Summer (DST): UTC-5 (CDT)
- ZIP codes: 52135, 52141, 52175
- GNIS feature ID: 0468545

Pleasant Valley Township is one of twenty townships in Fayette County, Iowa, United States. As of the 2010 census, its population was 1,002.

== Geography ==
According to the United States Census Bureau, Pleasant Valley Township covers an area of 36.67 square miles (94.99 square kilometers); of this, 36.64 square miles (94.89 square kilometers, 99.89 percent) is land and 0.04 square miles (0.1 square kilometers, 0.11 percent) is water.

=== Cities, towns, villages ===
- Elgin

=== Unincorporated towns ===
- Brainard at 42.9308136°N 91.7051558°W

(This list is based on USGS data and may include former settlements.)

=== Adjacent townships ===
- Clermont Township (north)
- Grand Meadow Township, Clayton County (northeast)
- Marion Township, Clayton County (east)
- Highland Township, Clayton County (southeast)
- Illyria Township (south)
- Westfield Township (southwest)
- Union Township (west)
- Dover Township (northwest)

=== Cemeteries ===
The township contains these three cemeteries: Brainard, Elgin and God's Acres.

=== Major highways ===
- U.S. Route 18
- Iowa Highway 56

== School districts ==
- North Fayette Valley Community School District

== Political districts ==
- Iowa's 1st congressional district
- State House District 24
- State Senate District 12
