= Putnam Township, Fayette County, Iowa =

Putnam Township
- Township
- Location in Fayette County
- Coordinates: 42°41′14″N 91°40′01″W
- Country: United States
- State: Iowa
- County: Fayette

Area
  - Total: 36.56 sq mi (94.69 km^{2})
  - Land: 36.54 sq mi (94.63 km^{2})
  - Water: 0.023 sq mi (0.06 km^{2}) 0.06%
- Elevation: 1,109 ft (338 m)

Population (2010)
  - Total: 313
  - Density: 8.57/sq mi (3.31/km^{2})
- Time zone: UTC-6 (CST)
  - Summer (DST): UTC-5 (CDT)
- ZIP codes: 50606, 50607, 50650, 52076
- GNIS feature ID: 0468582

Putnam Township is one of twenty townships in Fayette County, Iowa, United States. As of the 2010 census, its population was 313.

== Geography ==
According to the United States Census Bureau, Putnam Township covers an area of 36.56 square miles (94.69 square kilometers); of this, 36.54 square miles (94.63 square kilometers, 99.94 percent) is land and 0.02 square miles (0.06 square kilometers, 0.06 percent) is water.

=== Unincorporated towns ===
- Maryville at 42.687762°N 91.645432°W

(This list is based on USGS data and may include former settlements.)

=== Adjacent townships ===
- Fairfield Township (north)
- Sperry Township, Clayton County (northeast)
- Cass Township, Clayton County (east)
- Richland Township, Delaware County (southeast)
- Madison Township, Buchanan County (south)
- Buffalo Township, Buchanan County (southwest)
- Scott Township (west)
- Smithfield Township (northwest)

=== Cemeteries ===
The township contains Union Cemetery.

=== Major highways ===
- Iowa Highway 3
- Iowa Highway 187

== School districts ==
- Oelwein Community School District
- Starmont Community School District

== Political districts ==
- Iowa's 1st congressional district
- State House District 24
- State Senate District 12
