= Mallory Township Bridge =

- U.S. National Register of Historic Places
- Location within Iowa Location within the United States
- Location: County road over an unnamed stream
- Nearest city: Osterdock, Iowa
- Coordinates: 42°43′08.3″N 91°10′42.8″W
- Built: 1890
- Built by: County work force
- Architectural style: Pratt half-hip pony truss
- MPS: Highway Bridges of Iowa MPS
- NRHP reference No.: 98000809
- Added to NRHP: June 25, 1998

The Mallory Township Bridge was a historic structure located southwest of Osterdock, Iowa, United States. It spanned an unnamed stream for 38 feet (12 m). In the summer of 1890 Clayton County sought bids to provide small-scale iron and combination spans to cross several small streams. D.H. Young of Manchester, Iowa won the contract, and provided eight superstructures for $2,730. The wrought iron components were rolled at Lackawanna in Pittsburgh. The spans were delivered the same year and erected by county work crews. This bridge has subsequently been removed and replaced. It was listed on the National Register of Historic Places in 1998.
