= Thomasville, Iowa =

- Unincorporated community
- Location within Iowa Location within the United States
- Coordinates: 42.7538727°N 91.5809813°W
- Country: United States
- State: Iowa
- County: Clayton
- Elevation: 1,004 ft (306 m)
- Time zone: UTC-6 (Central (CST))
  - Summer (DST): UTC-5 (CDT)
- Zip codes: 50606
- Area code: 563
- GNIS feature ID: 464777

Thomasville is an unincorporated community in Clayton County, Iowa, United States. Thomasville lies approximately 11 miles away from the county seat of Elkader.
