= Dover Township, Fayette County, Iowa =

Dover Township
- Township
- Location in Fayette County
- Coordinates: 43°02′17″N 91°46′43″W
- Country: United States
- State: Iowa
- County: Fayette

Area
  - Total: 37.33 sq mi (96.68 km^{2})
  - Land: 37.33 sq mi (96.68 km^{2})
  - Water: 0 sq mi (0 km^{2}) 0%
- Elevation: 965 ft (294 m)

Population (2010)
  - Total: 465
  - Density: 12.5/sq mi (4.81/km^{2})
- Time zone: UTC-6 (CST)
  - Summer (DST): UTC-5 (CDT)
- ZIP codes: 52133, 52135, 52141, 52161, 52175
- GNIS feature ID: 0467739

Dover Township is one of twenty townships in Fayette County, Iowa, United States. As of the 2010 census, its population was 465.

== Geography ==
According to the United States Census Bureau, Dover Township covers an area of 37.33 square miles (96.68 square kilometers).

=== Unincorporated towns ===
- Dover Mills at 43.019423°N 91.729323°W
- Eldorado at 43.050532°N 91.835439°W

(This list is based on USGS data and may include former settlements.)

=== Adjacent townships ===
- Military Township, Winneshiek County (north)
- Bloomfield Township, Winneshiek County (northeast)
- Clermont Township (east)
- Pleasant Valley Township (southeast)
- Union Township (south)
- Windsor Township (southwest)
- Auburn Township (west)
- Washington Township, Winneshiek County (northwest)

=== Cemeteries ===
The township contains these six cemeteries: Auburn Township, Bethany, Dover Township, George, Nutting and Saint Peter.

=== Major highways ===
- Iowa Highway 150

=== Landmarks ===
- Dutton Cave County Park
- Goeken County Park

== School districts ==
- North Fayette Valley Community School District

== Political districts ==
- Iowa's 1st congressional district
- State House District 18
- State Senate District 9
