= Central Community School District =

Public school district in Elkader, Iowa, United States

Coordinates: 42.856578°N 91.407431°W

Location
- Elkader, Iowa Clayton County United States
- Coordinates: 42.856578, -91.407431

District information
- Type: Local school district
- Grades: PK-12
- Superintendent: Micah Gearhart
- Schools: 2
- Budget: $7,345,000 (2020-21)
- NCES District ID: 1906840

Students and staff
- Students: 473 (2022-23)
- Teachers: 36.28 FTE
- Staff: 36.27 FTE
- Student–teacher ratio: 13.04
- Athletic conference: Upper Iowa
- District mascot: Warriors
- Colors: Red and Black

Other information
- Website: www.central.k12.ia.us

The Central Community School District is rural public school district headquartered in Elkader, Iowa.

The district is entirely in Clayton County. In addition to Elkader, it serves Elkport, Garber, St. Olaf, and Volga. It also serves the unincorporated areas of Littleport and Mederville. The school mascot is the Warrior, and the colors are red and black.

== History ==
The first graduating class from Elkader High School was in 1875, with the last class graduating in 1953 as the local school system was consolidated into Central Community School District. The original high school building, built in the late 1860s, was two stories high and was considered one of the best in the county. Multiple additions were made to the first structure before it was gutted by a fire on May 25, 1936. The grade school building to the north of the structure and the gymnasium to the south were spared from the fire. The grade school building was used as the Elkader Junior College starting in 1929, with enrollment of 61 students in 1937. The doors were closed to the Junior College in 1947 after World War II.

The new school district, formed in 1952, absorbed independent school systems in Elkport, Garber and Littleport. St. Olaf joined the district in 1954, and Volga joined in 1962. The first Elkader High School building burned to the ground in 1936 and was replaced by a glass block and brick building in 1937. The former Elkader Junior College building was on the same site as the current school and was being utilized for extra classrooms until August 1969 when arson claimed the building. A new gymnasium and elementary facilities were built throughout 1973-1974.

In 1983, Central began a sports sharing agreement with the Garnavillo Community School District due to low enrollment at Garnavillo. The combined mascot was the WarHawks. Sports shared included football, baseball, boys and girls track, boys and girls golf, and cross country. In December 1999, the Garnavillo Community School District voted to begin whole-grade sharing with the Guttenberg Community School District, ending the sports sharing agreement. Garnavillo and Guttenberg later merged into a single school district now known as the Clayton Ridge Community School District.

In 2005, Central's original school symbol "Willie the Warrior", a drawing of an American Indian carrying a tomahawk and a spear, was retired at the request of the Iowa Department of Education, citing concerns about the caricature being stereotypic and demeaning. A new mascot was created of a "C" for Central, and in the mid-2010s a more Warrior/Trojan-like mascot was adopted.

In 2015, the district proposed a $6.85 million bond that was voted down. Another attempt was made in 2016 for $6 million which passed. The remodel included a first-floor commons area and cafeteria, a fully secure entrance for both the elementary wing and middle school/high school, fully remodeled science classrooms, a new middle school/high school media center, a new elevator, an additional 900 square feet in academic space, additional parking spots and improvements that made the building ADA compliant.

== Schools ==
The district operates two schools in a single facility in Elkader:

- Central Elementary School
- Central Middle School/High School

=== Central High School ===
==== Athletics ====
The Warriors compete in the Upper Iowa Conference in the following sports:

- Cross Country
  - 2015 Girls State Champion
  - 2016 Girls State Champion
- Volleyball
- Football
- Basketball
- Wrestling
- Track and Field
- Golf
- Baseball
- Softball
  - 1969 State Champions

== Notable graduates ==
- Jack Dittmer, Major League Baseball second baseman for the Boston/Milwaukee Braves and Detroit Tigers
- Heather Zichal, Former Deputy Assistant of Energy and Climate Change under Barack Obama

== See also ==
- List of school districts in Iowa
- List of high schools in Iowa
