= Edgewood–Colesburg Community School District =

Public school district in Edgewood, Iowa

Coordinates: 42.645031°N 91.405845°W

Location
- Edgewood, Iowa Clayton and Delaware counties United States
- Coordinates: 42.645031, -91.405845

District information
- Type: Local school district
- Grades: K–12
- Established: 1961
- Superintendent: Rob Busch
- Schools: 2
- Budget: $8,196,000 (2022-23)
- NCES District ID: 1910500

Students and staff
- Students: 516 (2022-23)
- Teachers: 43.08 FTE
- Staff: 51.77 FTE
- Student–teacher ratio: 11.98
- Athletic conference: Tri-Rivers
- District mascot: Vikings
- Colors: Black and Gold

Other information
- Website: www.edge-cole.k12.ia.us

Edgewood–Colesburg Community School District is a rural public school district headquartered in Edgewood, Iowa. It includes an elementary school in Colesburg and a secondary school in Edgewood. The district occupies sections of Clayton and Delaware counties. The school mascot is the Vikings, and their colors are black and gold.

As of 2015, Rob Busch was the superintendent, and the district was sharing services with other Iowa districts. Circa several years prior to 2016, it had 600 students, but it declined to 535 students by 2015.

== Schools ==
The district operates two schools:

- Edgewood–Colesburg Elementary School, Colesburg
- Edgewood–Colesburg High School, Edgewood

=== Edgewood–Colesburg High School ===
==== Athletics ====
The Vikings participate in the Tri-Rivers Conference in the following sports:

- Football
- Cross country
- Volleyball
- Basketball
- Wrestling
- Golf
- Track and field
- Soccer
- Baseball
- Softball

== See also ==
- List of school districts in Iowa
- List of high schools in Iowa
