= Richland Township, Delaware County, Iowa =

Richland Township
- Township
- Location in Delaware County
- Coordinates: 42°36′15″N 91°32′34″W
- Country: United States
- State: Iowa
- County: Delaware

Area
  - Total: 36.65 sq mi (94.93 km^{2})
  - Land: 36.48 sq mi (94.47 km^{2})
  - Water: 0.18 sq mi (0.47 km^{2}) 0.5%
- Elevation: 1,093 ft (333 m)

Population (2000)
  - Total: 575
  - Density: 16/sq mi (6.1/km^{2})
- GNIS feature ID: 0468602

Richland Township is a township in Delaware County, Iowa, United States. As of the 2000 census, its population was 575.

== Geography ==
Richland Township covers an area of 36.65 square miles (94.93 square kilometers); of this, 0.18 square miles (0.47 square kilometers) or 0.5 percent is water. The streams of Fenchel Creek and Sand Hagen Creek run through this township.

== History ==
According to the 1870 census, about 883 people lived there. 68 of them were born in Bohemia, several having immigrated from the Tábor District from villages like Hlavatce and Val as well as the town Veselí nad Lužnicí.

=== Cities and towns ===
- Dundee

=== Unincorporated towns ===
- Forestville

(This list is based on USGS data and may include former settlements.)

=== Adjacent townships ===
- Cass Township, Clayton County (north)
- Lodomillo Township, Clayton County (northeast)
- Honey Creek Township (east)
- Delaware Township (southeast)
- Coffins Grove Township (south)
- Fremont Township, Buchanan County (southwest)
- Madison Township, Buchanan County (west)
- Putnam Township, Fayette County (northwest)

=== Cemeteries ===
The township contains six cemeteries: Forestville, Pleasant Hill, Reynolds, Saint Albert, Spring Hill and Stanger Farm.
