= Boardman Township =

Boardman Township may refer to the following places in the United States:

- Boardman Township, Clayton County, Iowa
- Boardman Township, Michigan
- Boardman Township, Ohio
