= Wood, Iowa =

- Unincorporated community
- Location within Iowa Location within the United States
- Coordinates: 42.6574882°N 91.3326374°W
- Country: United States
- State: Iowa
- County: Clayton
- Elevation: 1,175 ft (358 m)
- Time zone: UTC-6 (Central (CST))
  - Summer (DST): UTC-5 (CDT)
- Zip codes: 52042
- Area code: 563
- GNIS feature ID: 463176

Wood is an unincorporated community in Clayton County, Iowa, United States. The county seat of Elkader lies 14 miles (23 km) to the north.

== History ==
Wood's population was 50 in 1925. The population was 25 in 1940.
