= Hardin, Iowa =

- Unincorporated community
- Location within Iowa Location within the United States
- Country: United States
- State: Iowa
- County: Clayton
- Elevation: 1,040 ft (320 m)
- Time zone: UTC-6 (Central (CST))
  - Summer (DST): UTC-5 (CDT)
- Area code: 563
- GNIS feature ID: 457246

Hardin is an unincorporated community in Clayton County, Iowa, United States.

Hardin was surveyed in 1854.
