= Updegraff, Iowa =

- Unincorporated community
- Location within Iowa Location within the United States
- Coordinates: 42.6838786°N 91.2370776°W
- Country: United States
- State: Iowa
- County: Clayton
- Elevation: 1,135 ft (346 m)
- Time zone: UTC-6 (Central (CST))
  - Summer (DST): UTC-5 (CDT)
- Zip codes: 52048
- Area code: 563
- GNIS feature ID: 462488

Updegraff is an unincorporated community in Clayton County, Iowa, United States. The county seat of Elkader lies approximately 15 miles to the northwest.

== History ==
Updegraff's population was 27 in 1902.
