= Watson, Iowa =

- Unincorporated community
- Location within Iowa Location within the United States
- Coordinates: 43.0752604°N 91.3301346°W
- Country: United States
- State: Iowa
- County: Clayton
- Elevation: 1,181 ft (360 m)
- Time zone: UTC-6 (Central (CST))
  - Summer (DST): UTC-5 (CDT)
- Zip codes: 52159
- Area code: 563
- GNIS feature ID: 464794

Watson is an unincorporated community in Clayton County, Iowa, United States. The county seat of Elkader lies approximately 15 miles to the southwest.

== History ==
Watson's population was 25 in 1902, and 27 in 1925. The population was 27 in 1940.
