= Wagner Township =

Wagner Township may refer to the following townships in the United States:

- Wagner Township, Clayton County, Iowa
- Wagner Township, Aitkin County, Minnesota
