= McGregor Heights, Iowa =

- Unincorporated community
- Location within Iowa Location within the United States
- Coordinates: 43.0338732°N 91.1773521°W
- Country: United States
- State: Iowa
- County: Clayton
- Elevation: 951 ft (290 m)
- Time zone: UTC-6 (Central (CST))
  - Summer (DST): UTC-5 (CDT)
- Zip codes: 52157
- Area code: 563
- GNIS feature ID: 464648

McGregor Heights is an unincorporated community in Clayton County, Iowa, United States. McGregor Heights lies on the Mississippi River, and on Iowa's border with Wisconsin. The county seat of Elkader lies 17 miles to the southwest.
