= Monona =

Monona could refer to any of the following.

Geographical locations:

- Monona County, Iowa, a county in Iowa, United States
- Monona, Iowa, city in Clayton County, Iowa, United States
- Monona Township, Clayton County, Iowa, township in Clayton County, Iowa, United States
- Monona, Wisconsin, a suburb of Madison in Dane County
- Monona Grove High School, a high school in Monona, Wisconsin
- Lake Monona, a lake in Dane County, Wisconsin

Points of interest

- Monona Terrace, a convention center in Madison, Wisconsin
