= Giard, Iowa =

- Unincorporated community
- Location within Iowa Location within the United States
- Coordinates: 43.0055403°N 91.2892995°W
- Country: United States
- State: Iowa
- County: Clayton
- Elevation: 1,112 ft (339 m)
- Time zone: UTC-6 (Central (CST))
  - Summer (DST): UTC-5 (CDT)
- Area code: 563
- GNIS feature ID: 456893

Giard is an unincorporated community in Clayton County, Iowa, United States. Its elevation is 1,122 feet (342 m), and it is located at 43°0′20″N 91°17′21″W (43.0055403, -91.2892995). A post office was established in the community on September 28, 1854; after being disestablished, it was restored on August 7, 1914, and operated until January 15, 1925, except for a short hiatus at the end of 1918.

== History ==
Giard was founded in 1871 and was named after Basil Giard. Giard's population was 72 in 1902, and 165 in 1925.
