= Turkey River =

Turkey River may refer to

- Turkey River, Iowa, an unincorporated community
- Turkey River (Iowa), a tributary of the Mississippi River
- Turkey River (New Hampshire), a tributary of the Merrimack River
