= Eckards, Iowa =

- Unincorporated community
- Location within Iowa Location within the United States
- Coordinates: 42.8563771°N 91.1042957°W
- Country: United States
- State: Iowa
- County: Clayton
- Elevation: 614 ft (187 m)
- Time zone: UTC-6 (Central (CST))
  - Summer (DST): UTC-5 (CDT)
- Zip codes: 52049
- Area code: 563
- GNIS feature ID: 464088

Eckards is an unincorporated community in Clayton County, Iowa, United States. Eckards lies on the Mississippi River, and on Iowa's border with Wisconsin. The county seat of Elkader is located approximately 15 miles to the west.

== History ==
The population of Eckards was 50 in 1940.
