= Beulah, Iowa =

- Unincorporated community
- Location within Iowa
- Coordinates: 43°01′38″N 91°18′29″W
- Country: United States
- State: Iowa
- County: Clayton
- Elevation: 945 ft (288 m)
- Time zone: UTC-6 (Central (CST))
  - Summer (DST): UTC-5 (CDT)
- Zip Code: 52157
- Area code: 563
- GNIS feature ID: 464462

Beulah /boʊlə/ is a small unincorporated community in Clayton County, Iowa, United States.

== History ==
A post office operated in Beulah from January 13, 1873, to October 31, 1905. The population was 12 in 1940.

== Geographically ==
Biaura is located at an elevation of 288 meters (945 feet) above sea level, and its time zone is UTC-6, which is Central Time (CST). It also observes Daylight Saving Time, which is UTC-5 (CDT), one hour ahead of UTC-6.
