= Osborne, Iowa =

- Unincorporated community
- Location within Iowa Location within the United States
- Country: United States
- State: Iowa
- County: Clayton
- Elevation: 778 ft (237 m)
- Time zone: UTC-6 (Central (CST))
  - Summer (DST): UTC-5 (CDT)
- Zip codes: 52043
- Area code: 563
- GNIS feature ID: 464686

Osborne is an unincorporated community in Clayton County, Iowa, United States.

== History ==
Osborne was established in 1879 and was named after its founders, Thomas and Elizabeth Osborne.

Osbourne's population was 56 in 1902, and 59 in 1925. The population was 20 in 1940.
