= Coffins Grove Township, Delaware County, Iowa =

Coffins Grove Township
- Township
- Location in Delaware County
- Coordinates: 42°30′43″N 91°33′17″W
- Country: United States
- State: Iowa
- County: Delaware

Area
  - Total: 36.55 sq mi (94.67 km^{2})
  - Land: 36.55 sq mi (94.67 km^{2})
  - Water: 0 sq mi (0 km^{2}) 0%
- Elevation: 1,037 ft (316 m)

Population (2000)
  - Total: 615
  - Density: 17/sq mi (6.5/km^{2})
- GNIS feature ID: 0467630

Coffins Grove Township is a township in Delaware County, Iowa, United States. As of the 2000 census, its population was 615.

== History ==
Coffins Grove Township (formerly Coffin's Grove with the apostrophe s) was organized in 1855. It is named for Clement Coffin, who settled in a forested grove about 15 years before.

== Geography ==
Coffins Grove Township covers an area of 36.55 square miles (94.67 square kilometers). The stream of Prairie Creek runs through this township.

=== Cities and towns ===
- Masonville

=== Adjacent townships ===
- Richland Township (north)
- Honey Creek Township (northeast)
- Delaware Township (east)
- Prairie Township (south)
- Middlefield Township, Buchanan County (southwest)
- Fremont Township, Buchanan County (west)
- Madison Township, Buchanan County (northwest)

=== Cemeteries ===
The township contains three cemeteries: Coffins Grove, Greenwood and Saint Mary.

=== Airports and landing strips ===
- Manchester Municipal Airport
