= Read Township, Clayton County, Iowa =

Township in Iowa, US

Read Township
- Township
- Location in Clayton County
- Coordinates: 42°51′44″N 091°19′57″W
- Country: United States
- State: Iowa
- County: Clayton

Area
  - Total: 27.11 sq mi (70.21 km^{2})
  - Land: 27.11 sq mi (70.21 km^{2})
  - Water: 0 sq mi (0 km^{2}) 0%
- Elevation: 902 ft (275 m)

Population (2000)
  - Total: 300
  - Density: 11/sq mi (4.3/km^{2})
- GNIS feature ID: 0468589

Read Township is a township in Clayton County, Iowa, United States. As of the 2000 census, its population was 300.

== History ==
Read Township was organized in 1856. It is named for Robert R. Read.

== Geography ==
Read Township covers an area of 27.11 square miles (70.2 km^{2}) and contains no incorporated settlements. According to the USGS, it contains six cemeteries: Clayton Center, Colony Catholic, County Home, Meenan, Union and Zion Lutheran.

The streams of Bente Branch and Spring Branch run through this township.
