= Millville, Iowa =

- Unincorporated Community
- Location of Millville, Iowa
- Coordinates: 42°42′15″N 91°4′34″W
- Country: United States
- State: Iowa
- County: Clayton

Area
  - Total: 0.069 sq mi (0.18 km^{2})
  - Land: 0.069 sq mi (0.18 km^{2})
  - Water: 0 sq mi (0 km^{2})
- Elevation: 627 ft (191 m)

Population (2010)
  - Total: 30
  - Estimate (2012): 29
  - Density: 429/sq mi (165.5/km^{2})
- Time zone: UTC-6 (Central (CST))
  - Summer (DST): UTC-5 (CDT)
- ZIP code: 52052
- Area code: 563
- FIPS code: 19-52410
- GNIS feature ID: 0459117

Millville is an unincorporated town and former city in Clayton County, Iowa, United States. The population was 30 at the 2010 census, up from 23 in the 2000 census, before it became unincorporated.

== History ==
The population of Millville was 26 in 1940.

The city of Millville was incorporated in 1967. In mid 2014, the city of Millville disincorporated due to a population decrease.

Millville is best known for the Millville Poltergeist that shook the small sub-division of Guttenberg in 1960.

== Geography ==
The community is located at 42.703640°N 91.076388°W. It lies along the Turkey River and is located on U.S. Route 52.

According to the 2010 census, the city had a total area of 0.067 square miles (0.17 km^{2}), all land.

Millville has a seasonal connection across the Mississippi River to Cassville, Wisconsin via the Cassville Car Ferry.

== Unincorporation ==
In October 2013, the city started undergoing the process of unincorporating itself, and formally became unincorporated in July 2014.

== Demographics ==
Historical populations
Year	Pop.	±%
1970	27	—
1980	50	+85.2%
1990	32	−36.0%
2000	23	−28.1%
2010	30	+30.4%
2012	29	−3.3%
2014	29	+0.0%
Source:"U.S. Census website". United States Census Bureau. and Iowa Data Center; Source: U.S. Decennial Census

=== 2010 census ===
As of the census of 2010, there were 30 people, 12 households, and 9 families living in the city. The population density was 428.6 inhabitants per square mile (165.5/km^{2}). There were 12 housing units at an average density of 171.4 per square mile (66.2/km^{2}). The racial makeup of the city was 100.0% White.

There were 12 households, of which 25.0% had children under the age of 18 living with them, 58.3% were married couples living together, 16.7% had a male householder with no wife present, and 25.0% were non-families. 16.7% of all households were made up of individuals. The average household size was 2.50 and the average family size was 2.78.

The median age in the city was 38 years. 23.3% of residents were under the age of 18; 13.3% were between the ages of 18 and 24; 23.4% were from 25 to 44; 20% were from 45 to 64; and 20% were 65 years of age or older. The gender makeup of the city was 56.7% male and 43.3% female.

=== 2000 census ===
As of the census of 2000, there were 23 people, 10 households, and 8 families living in the city. The population density was 342.6 inhabitants per square mile (132.3/km^{2}). There were 11 housing units at an average density of 163.9 per square mile (63.3/km^{2}). The racial makeup of the city was 100.00% White.

There were 10 households, out of which 20.0% had children under the age of 18 living with them, 80.0% were married couples living together, and 20.0% were non-families. 20.0% of all households were made up of individuals, and none had someone living alone who was 65 years of age or older. The average household size was 2.30 and the average family size was 2.63.

In the city, the population was spread out, with 21.7% under the age of 18, 17.4% from 25 to 44, 34.8% from 45 to 64, and 26.1% who were 65 years of age or older. The median age was 56 years. For every 100 females, there were 76.9 males. For every 100 females age 18 and over, there were 100.0 males.

The median income for a household in the city was $29,583, and the median income for a family was $29,583. Males had a median income of $6,250 versus $27,500 for females. The per capita income for the city was $14,378. None of the population and none of the families were below the poverty line.

== See also ==
- List of Discontinued cities in Iowa
