= Luana, Iowa =

- City
- Location of Luana, Iowa
- Coordinates: 43°03′34″N 91°27′21″W
- Country: United States
- State: Iowa
- County: Clayton
- Incorporated: May 29, 1911

Area
  - Total: 1.10 sq mi (2.85 km^{2})
  - Land: 1.10 sq mi (2.85 km^{2})
  - Water: 0 sq mi (0.00 km^{2})
- Elevation: 1,132 ft (345 m)

Population (2020)
  - Total: 301
  - Density: 273.2/sq mi (105.49/km^{2})
- Time zone: UTC-6 (Central (CST))
  - Summer (DST): UTC-5 (CDT)
- ZIP code: 52156
- Area code: 563
- FIPS code: 19-47055
- GNIS feature ID: 2395781

Luana is a city in Clayton County, Iowa, United States. The population was 301 at the time of the 2020 census, up from 249 in 2000.

Luana is the site of a large cheese factory of Swiss Valley Farms, a cooperative owned by 625 dairy producers in four states. The facility was acquired by the company in 1967, and manufactures a variety of cheeses. It has undergone several rounds of expansion, beginning in 2010 and 2015.

Luana is located along U.S. Routes 18 and 52 in northern Clayton County.

== History ==
Luana was surveyed in 1867 by W. S. Scott, and named in honor of his wife, Luana.

== Geography ==
According to the United States Census Bureau, the city has a total area of 1.05 square miles (2.72 km^{2}), all land.

== Demographics ==
Historical populations
Year	Pop.	±%
1880	124	—
1890	136	+9.7%
1900	157	+15.4%
1910	166	+5.7%
1920	181	+9.0%
1930	186	+2.8%
1940	204	+9.7%
1950	220	+7.8%
1960	276	+25.5%
1970	225	−18.5%
1980	246	+9.3%
1990	190	−22.8%
2000	249	+31.1%
2010	269	+8.0%
2020	301	+11.9%
Source:"U.S. Census website". United States Census Bureau. and Iowa Data Center; Source: U.S. Decennial Census

=== 2020 census ===
As of the census of 2020, there were 301 people, 115 households, and 70 families residing in the city. The population density was 273.2 inhabitants per square mile (105.5/km^{2}). There were 131 housing units at an average density of 118.9 per square mile (45.9/km^{2}). The racial makeup of the city was 93.4% White, 2.3% Black or African American, 0.0% Native American, 0.3% Asian, 0.0% Pacific Islander, 1.7% from other races and 2.3% from two or more races. Hispanic or Latino persons of any race comprised 6.0% of the population.

Of the 115 households, 33.9% of which had children under the age of 18 living with them, 45.2% were married couples living together, 7.8% were cohabitating couples, 22.6% had a female householder with no spouse or partner present and 24.3% had a male householder with no spouse or partner present. 39.1% of all households were non-families. 33.9% of all households were made up of individuals, 10.4% had someone living alone who was 65 years old or older.

The median age in the city was 38.3 years. 29.2% of the residents were under the age of 20; 7.3% were between the ages of 20 and 24; 20.3% were from 25 and 44; 28.9% were from 45 and 64; and 14.3% were 65 years of age or older. The gender makeup of the city was 54.2% male and 45.8% female.

=== 2010 census ===
As of the census of 2010, there were 269 people, 114 households, and 68 families living in the city. The population density was 256.2 inhabitants per square mile (98.9/km^{2}). There were 119 housing units at an average density of 113.3 per square mile (43.7/km^{2}). The racial makeup of the city was 99.3% White and 0.7% from two or more races. Hispanic or Latino of any race were 5.6% of the population.

There were 114 households, of which 30.7% had children under the age of 18 living with them, 46.5% were married couples living together, 9.6% had a female householder with no husband present, 3.5% had a male householder with no wife present, and 40.4% were non-families. 33.3% of all households were made up of individuals, and 18.5% had someone living alone who was 65 years of age or older. The average household size was 2.36 and the average family size was 3.04.

The median age in the city was 37.7 years. 28.3% of residents were under the age of 18; 6.7% were between the ages of 18 and 24; 22.7% were from 25 to 44; 25.4% were from 45 to 64; and 17.1% were 65 years of age or older. The gender makeup of the city was 48.0% male and 52.0% female.

=== 2000 census ===
As of the census of 2000, there were 249 people, 107 households, and 66 families living in the city. The population density was 237.1 inhabitants per square mile (91.5/km^{2}). There were 116 housing units at an average density of 110.5 per square mile (42.7/km^{2}). The racial makeup of the city was 99.60% White, and 0.40% from two or more races. Hispanic or Latino of any race were 5.22% of the population.

There were 107 households, out of which 29.0% had children under the age of 18 living with them, 48.6% were married couples living together, 10.3% had a female householder with no husband present, and 38.3% were non-families. 33.6% of all households were made up of individuals, and 12.1% had someone living alone who was 65 years of age or older. The average household size was 2.33 and the average family size was 2.91.

In the city, the population was spread out, with 22.9% under the age of 18, 8.0% from 18 to 24, 32.5% from 25 to 44, 18.1% from 45 to 64, and 18.5% who were 65 years of age or older. The median age was 39 years. For every 100 females, there were 104.1 males. For every 100 females age 18 and over, there were 106.5 males.

The median income for a household in the city was $29,583, and the median income for a family was $40,357. Males had a median income of $27,955 versus $19,688 for females. The per capita income for the city was $16,165. About 4.5% of families and 9.9% of the population were below the poverty line, including 6.4% of those under the age of eighteen and 5.7% of those 65 or over.

== Education ==
It is within the MFL MarMac Community School District. The district formed on July 1, 1994, with the merger of the Mar-Mac and M-F-L districts.
