= Smithfield Township, Fayette County, Iowa =

Smithfield Township
- Township
- Location in Fayette County
- Coordinates: 42°46′52″N 91°46′49″W
- Country: United States
- State: Iowa
- County: Fayette

Area
  - Total: 36.09 sq mi (93.47 km^{2})
  - Land: 36.09 sq mi (93.47 km^{2})
  - Water: 0 sq mi (0 km^{2}) 0%
- Elevation: 1,180 ft (360 m)

Population (2010)
  - Total: 250
  - Density: 6.9/sq mi (2.7/km^{2})
- Time zone: UTC-6 (CST)
  - Summer (DST): UTC-5 (CDT)
- ZIP codes: 50606, 52142
- GNIS feature ID: 0468723

Smithfield Township is one of twenty townships in Fayette County, Iowa, United States. As of the 2010 census, its population was 250.

== Geography ==
According to the United States Census Bureau, Smithfield Township covers an area of 36.09 square miles (93.47 square kilometers).

=== Adjacent townships ===
- Westfield Township (north)
- Illyria Township (northeast)
- Fairfield Township (east)
- Putnam Township (southeast)
- Scott Township (south)
- Jefferson Township (southwest)
- Harlan Township (west)
- Center Township (northwest)

=== Cemeteries ===
The township contains Garden Prairie Cemetery.

=== Major highways ===
- Iowa Highway 150
- Iowa Highway 187

== School districts ==
- North Fayette Valley Community School District
- Starmont Community School District
- West Central Community School District

== Political districts ==
- Iowa's 1st congressional district
- State House District 24
- State Senate District 12
