= Monona Township, Clayton County, Iowa =

Township in Iowa, US

Monona Township
- Township
- Location in Clayton County
- Coordinates: 43°02′41″N 091°26′00″W
- Country: United States
- State: Iowa
- County: Clayton

Area
  - Total: 36.65 sq mi (94.93 km^{2})
  - Land: 36.64 sq mi (94.91 km^{2})
  - Water: 0.0077 sq mi (0.02 km^{2}) 0.02%
- Elevation: 1,060 ft (323 m)

Population (2000)
  - Total: 2,225
  - Density: 61/sq mi (23.4/km^{2})
- GNIS feature ID: 0468390

Monona Township is a township in Clayton County, Iowa, United States. As of the 2000 census, its population was 2,225.

== Geography ==
Monona Township covers an area of 36.65 square miles (94.9 km^{2}) and contains two incorporated settlements: Luana and Monona. According to the USGS, it contains six cemeteries: Luana, Luana Lutheran, Monona, Pioneer, Saint Patricks and Saint Pauls Lutheran.
