= Volga, Iowa =

- City
- Location of Volga, Iowa
- Coordinates: 42°48′11″N 91°32′32″W
- Country: United States
- State: Iowa
- County: Clayton

Area
  - Total: 0.75 sq mi (1.95 km^{2})
  - Land: 0.75 sq mi (1.95 km^{2})
  - Water: 0 sq mi (0.00 km^{2})
- Elevation: 794 ft (242 m)

Population (2020)
  - Total: 203
  - Density: 269.9/sq mi (104.22/km^{2})
- Time zone: UTC-6 (Central (CST))
  - Summer (DST): UTC-5 (CDT)
- ZIP code: 52077
- Area code: 563
- FIPS code: 19-81345
- GNIS feature ID: 2397154

Volga is a city in Clayton County, Iowa, United States. The population was 203 at the time of the 2020 census, down from 247 in 2000.

== History ==
Volga (formerly Volga City) was laid out as a town in 1852. It got its name from the Volga River in Iowa, which in turn was named after the Volga River in Russia.

== Geography ==
Volga is located on the Volga River.

According to the United States Census Bureau, the city has a total area of 0.78 square miles (2.02 km^{2}), all land.

== Demographics ==
Historical Populations
Year	Pop.	±%
1880	344	—
1890	405	+17.7%
1900	444	+9.6%
1910	416	−6.3%
1920	415	−0.2%
1930	417	+0.5%
1940	429	+2.9%
1950	423	−1.4%
1960	361	−14.7%
1970	305	−15.5%
1980	310	+1.6%
1990	306	−1.3%
2000	247	−19.3%
2010	208	−15.8%
2020	203	−2.4%
Source:"U.S. Census website". United States Census Bureau. and Iowa Data Center; Source: U.S. Decennial Census

=== 2020 census ===
As of the census of 2020, there were 203 people, 90 households, and 61 families residing in the city. The population density was 269.9 inhabitants per square mile (104.2/km^{2}). There were 105 housing units at an average density of 139.6 per square mile (53.9/km^{2}). The racial makeup of the city was 96.1% White, 0.0% Black or African American, 0.0% Native American, 1.0% Asian, 0.0% Pacific Islander, 0.5% from other races and 2.5% from two or more races. Hispanic or Latino persons of any race comprised 1.0% of the population.

Of the 90 households, 23.3% of which had children under the age of 18 living with them, 51.1% were married couples living together, 8.9% were cohabitating couples, 17.8% had a female householder with no spouse or partner present and 22.2% had a male householder with no spouse or partner present. 32.2% of all households were non-families. 30.0% of all households were made up of individuals, 11.1% had someone living alone who was 65 years old or older.

The median age in the city was 46.8 years. 19.2% of the residents were under the age of 20; 6.9% were between the ages of 20 and 24; 22.2% were from 25 and 44; 21.7% were from 45 and 64; and 30.0% were 65 years of age or older. The gender makeup of the city was 53.7% male and 46.3% female.

=== 2010 census ===
As of the census of 2010, there were 208 people, 90 households, and 60 families living in the city. The population density was 266.7 inhabitants per square mile (103.0/km^{2}). There were 107 housing units at an average density of 137.2 per square mile (53.0/km^{2}). The racial makeup of the city was 97.1% White, 0.5% from other races, and 2.4% from two or more races. Hispanic or Latino of any race were 1.4% of the population.

There were 90 households, of which 26.7% had children under the age of 18 living with them, 55.6% were married couples living together, 5.6% had a female householder with no husband present, 5.6% had a male householder with no wife present, and 33.3% were non-families. 28.9% of all households were made up of individuals, and 13.3% had someone living alone who was 65 years of age or older. The average household size was 2.31 and the average family size was 2.83.

The median age in the city was 43 years. 24.5% of residents were under the age of 18; 4.8% were between the ages of 18 and 24; 25% were from 25 to 44; 30.8% were from 45 to 64; and 14.9% were 65 years of age or older. The gender makeup of the city was 53.4% male and 46.6% female.

=== 2000 census ===
As of the census of 2000, there were 247 people, 103 households, and 67 families living in the city. The population density was 314.0 inhabitants per square mile (121.2/km^{2}). There were 114 housing units at an average density of 144.9 per square mile (55.9/km^{2}). The racial makeup of the city was 99.19% White, and 0.81% from two or more races.

There were 103 households, out of which 30.1% had children under the age of 18 living with them, 55.3% were married couples living together, 8.7% had a female householder with no husband present, and 34.0% were non-families. 33.0% of all households were made up of individuals, and 15.5% had someone living alone who was 65 years of age or older. The average household size was 2.39 and the average family size was 3.06.

In the city, the population was spread out, with 27.5% under the age of 18, 4.5% from 18 to 24, 24.7% from 25 to 44, 25.1% from 45 to 64, and 18.2% who were 65 years of age or older. The median age was 39 years. For every 100 females, there were 87.1 males. For every 100 females age 18 and over, there were 88.4 males.

The median income for a household in the city was $24,375, and the median income for a family was $29,821. Males had a median income of $22,813 versus $21,786 for females. The per capita income for the city was $13,440. About 13.7% of families and 18.1% of the population were below the poverty line, including 17.1% of those under the age of eighteen and 29.8% of those 65 or over.

== Education ==
The municipality is within the boundary of the Central Community School District.
