= Prairie Township, Delaware County, Iowa =

Prairie Township
- Township
- Location in Delaware County
- Coordinates: 42°25′37″N 91°31′54″W
- Country: United States
- State: Iowa
- County: Delaware

Area
  - Total: 35.16 sq mi (91.07 km^{2})
  - Land: 35.16 sq mi (91.07 km^{2})
  - Water: 0 sq mi (0 km^{2}) 0%
- Elevation: 1,020 ft (311 m)

Population (2000)
  - Total: 373
  - Density: 11/sq mi (4.1/km^{2})
- GNIS feature ID: 0468569

Prairie Township is a township in Delaware County, Iowa, United States. As of the 2000 census, its population was 373.

== Geography ==
Prairie Township covers an area of 35.16 square miles (91.07 square kilometers).

=== Adjacent townships ===
- Coffins Grove Township (north)
- Delaware Township (northeast)
- Milo Township (east)
- Hazel Green Township (southeast)
- Adams Township (south)
- Newton Township, Buchanan County (southwest)
- Middlefield Township, Buchanan County (west)

=== Cemeteries ===
The township contains one cemetery, Sand Creek.

=== Major highways ===
- U.S. Route 20
