= Gunder, Iowa =

- Unincorporated community
- Location within Iowa Location within the United States
- Coordinates: 42.9716497°N 91.5131994°W
- Country: United States
- State: Iowa
- County: Clayton
- Elevation: 1,112 ft (339 m)
- Time zone: UTC-6 (Central (CST))
  - Summer (DST): UTC-5 (CDT)
- Zip codes: 52162
- Area code: 563
- GNIS feature ID: 457180

Gunder is an unincorporated community in Clayton County, Iowa, United States.

== Geography ==
The Turkey River flows south of Gunder, and Roberts Creek, a tributary, to the north. The county seat of Elkader lies approximately 10 miles to the southeast.

== History ==
Ole Nelson, a Norwegian immigrant and Civil War veteran, was one of the founders of the village of Gunder. He settled in the area after the war, and built the first building in Gunder.

Circa 1916, Gunder was home to the Norwegian Lutheran church.

Gunder's population was just 12 in 1902, and was also 12 in 1925. The population was 30 in 1940.

== See also ==
- Ceres, Iowa
