= Scott Township, Fayette County, Iowa =

Scott Township
- Township
- Location in Fayette County
- Coordinates: 42°41′15″N 91°47′11″W
- Country: United States
- State: Iowa
- County: Fayette

Area
  - Total: 36.23 sq mi (93.84 km^{2})
  - Land: 36.22 sq mi (93.82 km^{2})
  - Water: 0.0077 sq mi (0.02 km^{2}) 0.02%
- Elevation: 1,142 ft (348 m)

Population (2010)
  - Total: 254
  - Density: 7.01/sq mi (2.71/km^{2})
- Time zone: UTC-6 (CST)
  - Summer (DST): UTC-5 (CDT)
- ZIP codes: 50606, 50607, 50655, 50662, 50671, 52142
- GNIS feature ID: 0468666

Scott Township is one of twenty townships in Fayette County, Iowa, United States. As of the 2010 census, its population was 254.

== Geography ==
According to the United States Census Bureau, Scott Township covers an area of 36.23 square miles (93.84 square kilometers); of this, 36.23 square miles (93.82 square kilometers, 99.98 percent) is land and 0.01 square miles (0.02 square kilometers, 0.02 percent) is water.

=== Cities, towns, villages ===
- Stanley (partial)

=== Unincorporated towns ===
- Scott at 42.701928°N 91.765441°W

(This list is based on USGS data and may include former settlements.)

=== Adjacent townships ===
- Smithfield Township (north)
- Fairfield Township (northeast)
- Putnam Township (east)
- Madison Township, Buchanan County (southeast)
- Buffalo Township, Buchanan County (south)
- Hazleton Township, Buchanan County (southwest)
- Jefferson Township (west)
- Harlan Township (northwest)

=== Major highways ===
- Iowa Highway 3

== School districts ==
- Oelwein Community School District
- Starmont Community School District

== Political districts ==
- Iowa's 1st congressional district
- State House District 24
- State Senate District 12
