= Turkey River, Iowa =

- Unincorporated community
- Location within Iowa Location within the United States
- Coordinates: 42.7061039°N 91.0259620°W
- Country: United States
- State: Iowa
- County: Clayton
- Elevation: 630 ft (190 m)
- Time zone: UTC-6 (Central (CST))
  - Summer (DST): UTC-5 (CDT)
- Area code: 563
- GNIS feature ID: 462375

Turkey River is an unincorporated community in Clayton County, Iowa, United States. The community of Turkey River borders the Mississippi River, and the Turkey River. Turkey River also is situated on Iowa's border with Wisconsin.

== History ==
Turkey River's population was 53 in 1902, and 77 in 1925. The population was 55 in 1940.
