= Giard Township, Clayton County, Iowa =

Township in Iowa, US

Giard Township
- Township
- Location in Clayton County
- Coordinates: 43°02′21″N 091°18′42″W
- Country: United States
- State: Iowa
- County: Clayton

Area
  - Total: 36.53 sq mi (94.62 km^{2})
  - Land: 36.53 sq mi (94.62 km^{2})
  - Water: 0 sq mi (0 km^{2}) 0%
- Elevation: 1,073 ft (327 m)

Population (2000)
  - Total: 463
  - Density: 13/sq mi (4.9/km^{2})
- GNIS feature ID: 0467909

Giard Township is a township in Clayton County, Iowa, United States. As of the 2000 census, its population was 463.

== History ==
Giard Township is named for Basil Giard.

== Geography ==
Giard Township covers an area of 36.53 square miles (94.6 km^{2}) and contains no incorporated settlements. According to the USGS, it contains three cemeteries: Council Hill, Railroad Employee and Saint Wenceslaus.

== Transportation ==
Giard Township contains one airport, Monona Municipal Airport.
