= Garber, Iowa =

- City
- Location of Garber, Iowa
- Coordinates: 42°44′33″N 91°15′38″W
- Country: United States
- State: Iowa
- County: Clayton

Area
  - Total: 0.22 sq mi (0.58 km^{2})
  - Land: 0.22 sq mi (0.58 km^{2})
  - Water: 0 sq mi (0.00 km^{2})
- Elevation: 659 ft (201 m)

Population (2020)
  - Total: 76
  - Density: 338.3/sq mi (130.63/km^{2})
- Time zone: UTC-6 (Central (CST))
  - Summer (DST): UTC-5 (CDT)
- ZIP code: 52048
- Area code: 563
- FIPS code: 19-29685
- GNIS feature ID: 2394850

Garber is a city in Clayton County, Iowa, United States. The population was 76 at the time of the 2020 census, down from 103 in 2000.

== History ==
Garber, first called East Elkport, was surveyed in 1872 by John Garber, who also served as the first postmaster there.

== Geography ==
According to the United States Census Bureau, the city has a total area of 0.23 square miles (0.60 km^{2}), all land.

== Demographics ==
Historical populations
Year	Pop.	±%
1910	131	—
1920	189	+44.3%
1930	120	−36.5%
1940	158	+31.7%
1950	153	−3.2%
1960	148	−3.3%
1970	148	+0.0%
1980	140	−5.4%
1990	118	−15.7%
2000	103	−12.7%
2010	88	−14.6%
2020	76	−13.6%
Source:"U.S. Census website". United States Census Bureau. and Iowa Data Center; Source: U.S. Decennial Census

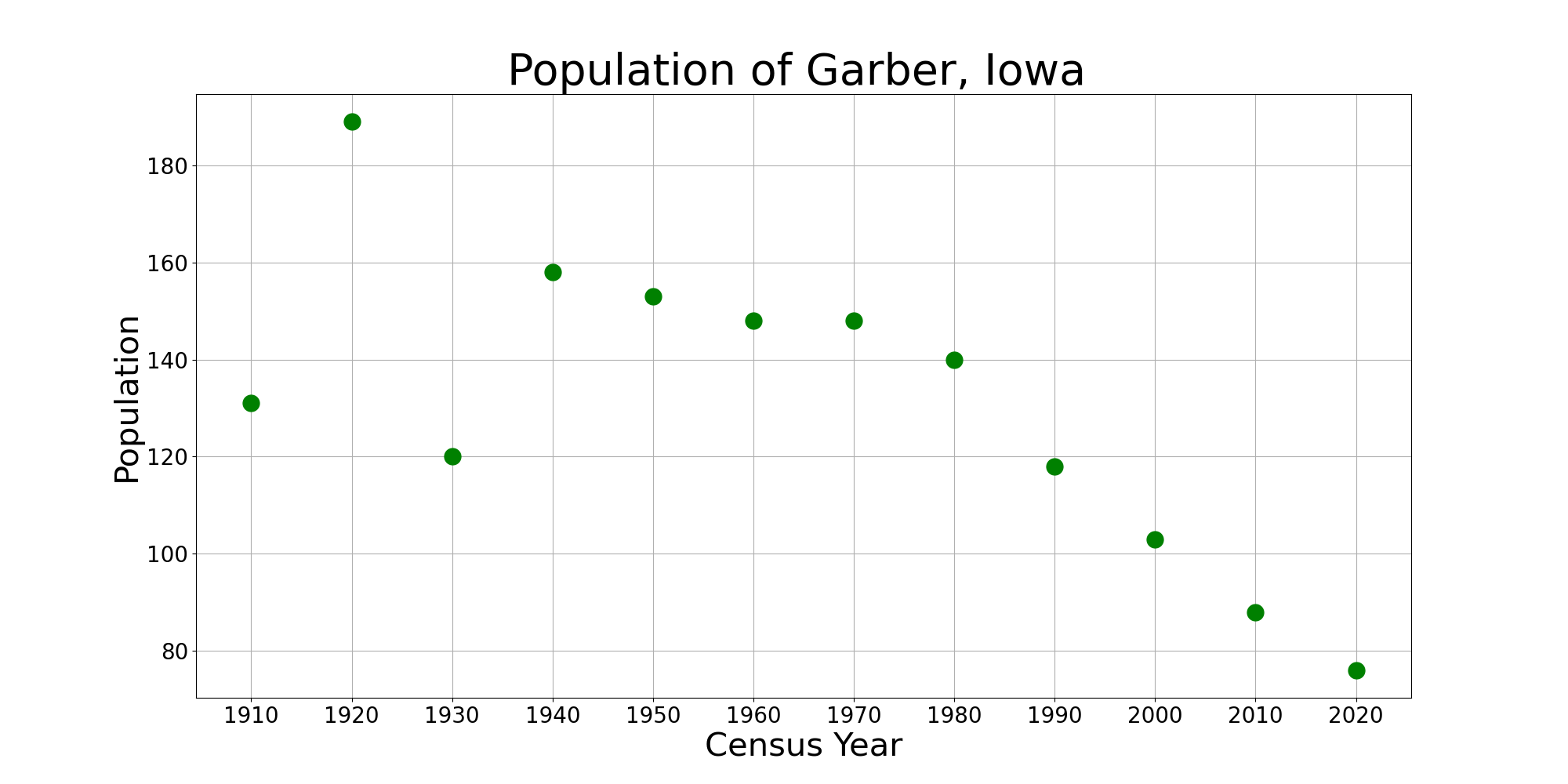
The population of Garber, Iowa from US census data

=== 2020 census ===
As of the census of 2020, there were 76 people, 39 households, and 23 families residing in the city. The population density was 338.3 inhabitants per square mile (130.6/km^{2}). There were 42 housing units at an average density of 187.0 per square mile (72.2/km^{2}). The racial makeup of the city was 98.7% White, 0.0% Black or African American, 0.0% Native American, 1.3% Asian, 0.0% Pacific Islander, 0.0% from other races and 0.0% from two or more races. Hispanic or Latino persons of any race comprised 0.0% of the population.

Of the 39 households, 17.9% of which had children under the age of 18 living with them, 41.0% were married couples living together, 17.9% were cohabitating couples, 17.9% had a female householder with no spouse or partner present and 23.1% had a male householder with no spouse or partner present. 41.0% of all households were non-families. 33.3% of all households were made up of individuals, 23.1% had someone living alone who was 65 years old or older.

The median age in the city was 53.5 years. 17.1% of the residents were under the age of 20; 5.3% were between the ages of 20 and 24; 9.2% were from 25 and 44; 42.1% were from 45 and 64; and 26.3% were 65 years of age or older. The gender makeup of the city was 52.6% male and 47.4% female.

=== 2010 census ===
As of the census of 2010, there were 88 people, 43 households, and 23 families living in the city. The population density was 382.6 inhabitants per square mile (147.7/km^{2}). There were 48 housing units at an average density of 208.7 per square mile (80.6/km^{2}). The racial makeup of the city was 100.0% White.

There were 43 households, of which 23.3% had children under the age of 18 living with them, 41.9% were married couples living together, 9.3% had a female householder with no husband present, 2.3% had a male householder with no wife present, and 46.5% were non-families. 32.6% of all households were made up of individuals, and 4.7% had someone living alone who was 65 years of age or older. The average household size was 2.05 and the average family size was 2.57.

The median age in the city was 43 years. 17% of residents were under the age of 18; 9.1% were between the ages of 18 and 24; 28.4% were from 25 to 44; 29.6% were from 45 to 64; and 15.9% were 65 years of age or older. The gender makeup of the city was 51.1% male and 48.9% female.

=== 2000 census ===
As of the census of 2000, there were 103 people, 54 households, and 21 families living in the city. The population density was 434.9 inhabitants per square mile (167.9/km^{2}). There were 57 housing units at an average density of 240.7 per square mile (92.9/km^{2}). The racial makeup of the city was 99.03% White and 0.97% Asian.

There were 54 households, out of which 20.4% had children under the age of 18 living with them, 33.3% were married couples living together, 5.6% had a female householder with no husband present, and 59.3% were non-families. 50.0% of all households were made up of individuals, and 25.9% had someone living alone who was 65 years of age or older. The average household size was 1.91 and the average family size was 2.77.

In the city, the population was spread out, with 22.3% under the age of 18, 7.8% from 18 to 24, 31.1% from 25 to 44, 16.5% from 45 to 64, and 22.3% who were 65 years of age or older. The median age was 37 years. For every 100 females, there were 71.7 males. For every 100 females age 18 and over, there were 63.3 males.

The median income for a household in the city was $22,708, and the median income for a family was $28,125. Males had a median income of $27,500 versus $20,417 for females. The per capita income for the city was $11,618. There were 12.0% of families and 16.0% of the population living below the poverty line, including 21.2% of under eighteens and 13.3% of those over 64.

== Education ==
The municipality is within the boundary of the Central Community School District.
