= Edgewood, Iowa =

- City
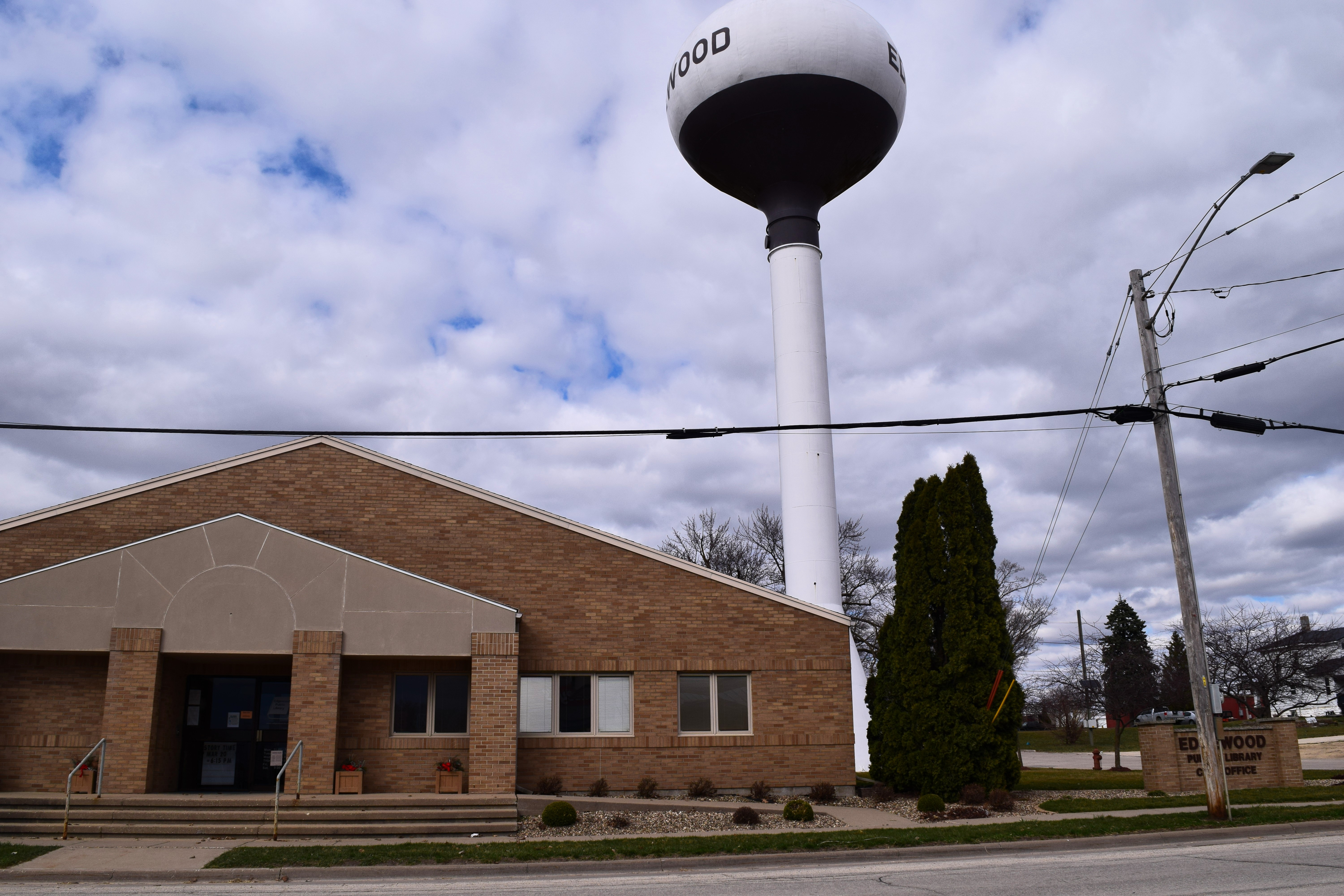
- Edgewood's library and water tower

- Location of Edgewood, Iowa
- Coordinates: 42°38′39″N 91°24′09″W
- Country: United States
- State: Iowa
- Counties: Delaware, Clayton

Area
  - Total: 0.94 sq mi (2.44 km^{2})
  - Land: 0.94 sq mi (2.44 km^{2})
  - Water: 0 sq mi (0.00 km^{2})
- Elevation: 1,165 ft (355 m)

Population (2020)
  - Total: 909
  - Density: 964.3/sq mi (372.31/km^{2})
- Time zone: UTC-6 (Central (CST))
  - Summer (DST): UTC-5 (CDT)
- ZIP codes: 52042, 52044
- Area code: 563
- FIPS code: 19-24060
- GNIS feature ID: 2394620
- Website: www.edgewoodiowa.com

Edgewood is a city in Clayton and Delaware counties in the U.S. state of Iowa. Highway 3, which runs through the center of town, is the dividing line between the two counties. The Edgewood post office was established in 1852 on the Clayton side of the town. Edgewood was formally incorporated in 1892, although it had a functioning council for some time before that date. The population was 909 at the time of the 2020 census, down from 923 in 2000.

== Geography ==
Edgewood is divided by Iowa Highway 3; the northern part of the town is in Lodomillo Township, Clayton County and the southern part is in Honey Creek Township, Delaware County.

According to the United States Census Bureau, the city has a total area of 0.85 square miles (2.20 km^{2}), all land.

== Demographics ==
Historical populations
Year	Pop.	±%
1880	216	—
1890	255	+18.1%
1900	565	+121.6%
1910	555	−1.8%
1920	617	+11.2%
1930	638	+3.4%
1940	716	+12.2%
1950	696	−2.8%
1960	767	+10.2%
1970	786	+2.5%
1980	900	+14.5%
1990	842	−6.4%
2000	923	+9.6%
2010	864	−6.4%
2020	909	+5.2%
Source:"U.S. Census website". United States Census Bureau. and Iowa Data Center; Source: U.S. Decennial Census

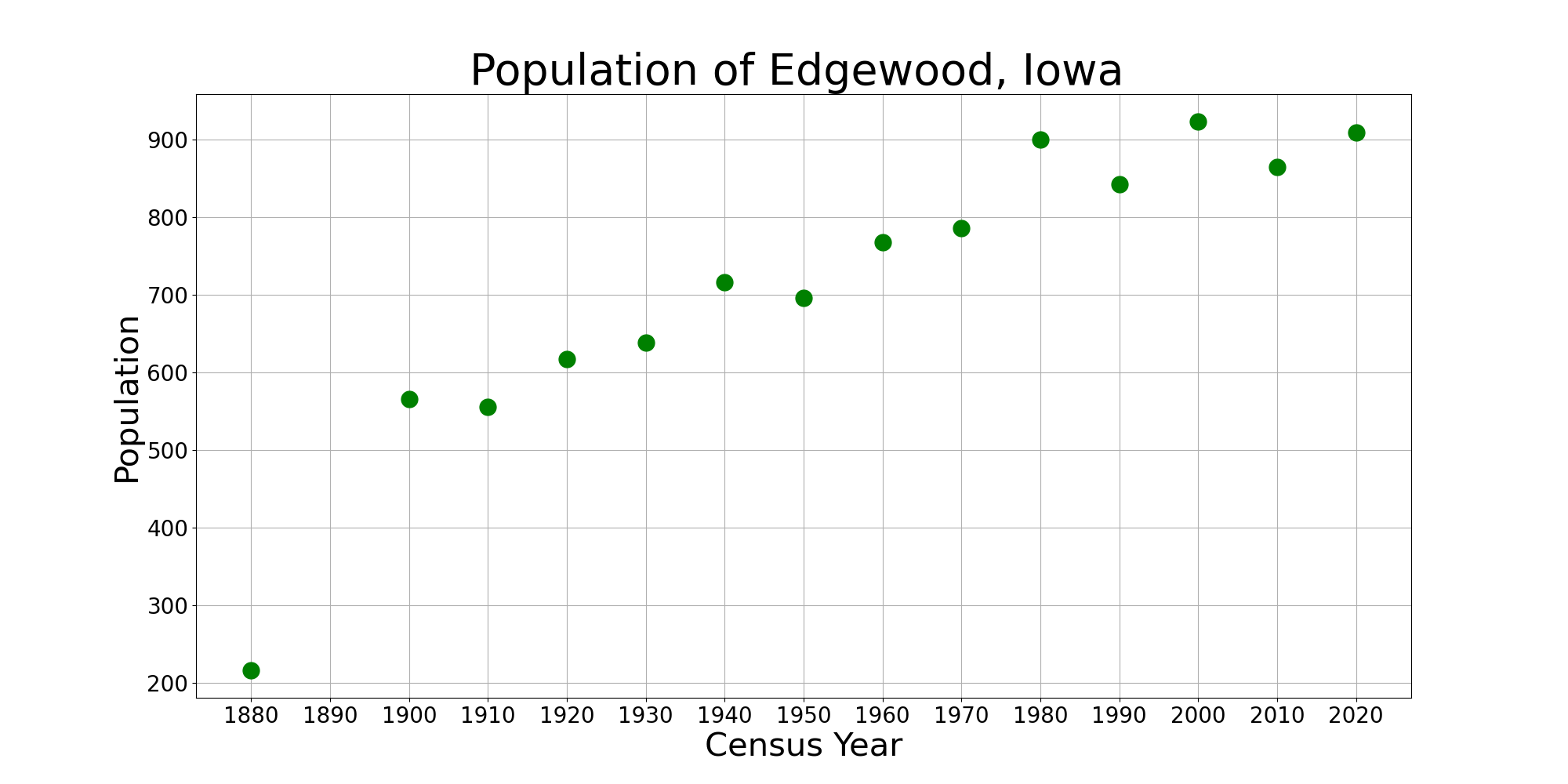
The population of Edgewood, Iowa from US census data

=== 2020 census ===
As of the census of 2020, there were 909 people, 379 households, and 231 families residing in the city. The population density was 964.3 inhabitants per square mile (372.3/km^{2}). There were 418 housing units at an average density of 443.4 per square mile (171.2/km^{2}). The racial makeup of the city was 96.3% White, 0.2% Black or African American, 0.1% Native American, 0.3% Asian, 0.0% Pacific Islander, 0.4% from other races and 2.6% from two or more races. Hispanic or Latino persons of any race comprised 1.2% of the population.

Of the 379 households, 26.9% of which had children under the age of 18 living with them, 45.6% were married couples living together, 5.5% were cohabitating couples, 31.7% had a female householder with no spouse or partner present and 17.2% had a male householder with no spouse or partner present. 39.1% of all households were non-families. 34.6% of all households were made up of individuals, 19.0% had someone living alone who was 65 years old or older.

The median age in the city was 42.1 years. 24.2% of the residents were under the age of 20; 5.4% were between the ages of 20 and 24; 22.9% were from 25 and 44; 20.6% were from 45 and 64; and 27.0% were 65 years of age or older. The gender makeup of the city was 44.9% male and 55.1% female.

=== 2010 census ===
As of the census of 2010, there were 864 people, 385 households, and 216 families living in the city. The population density was 1,016.5 inhabitants per square mile (392.5/km^{2}). There were 421 housing units at an average density of 495.3 per square mile (191.2/km^{2}). The racial makeup of the city was 99.1% White, 0.1% Native American, 0.1% from other races, and 0.7% from two or more races. Hispanic or Latino of any race were 0.7% of the population.

There were 385 households, of which 25.5% had children under the age of 18 living with them, 45.5% were married couples living together, 8.3% had a female householder with no husband present, 2.3% had a male householder with no wife present, and 43.9% were non-families. 38.7% of all households were made up of individuals, and 22.8% had someone living alone who was 65 years of age or older. The average household size was 2.09 and the average family size was 2.79.

The median age in the city was 46.6 years. 21.6% of residents were under the age of 18; 6% were between the ages of 18 and 24; 20.5% were from 25 to 44; 23.5% were from 45 to 64; and 28.6% were 65 years of age or older. The gender makeup of the city was 45.7% male and 54.3% female.

=== 2000 census ===
As of the census of 2000, there were 923 people, 364 households, and 243 families living in the city. The population density was 1,092.6 inhabitants per square mile (421.9/km^{2}). There were 411 housing units at an average density of 486.5 per square mile (187.8/km^{2}). The racial makeup of the city was 99.46% White, 0.11% Native American, 0.22% from other races, and 0.22% from two or more races. Hispanic or Latino of any race were 0.76% of the population.

There were 364 households, out of which 32.1% had children under the age of 18 living with them, 55.2% were married couples living together, 8.0% had a female householder with no husband present, and 33.2% were non-families. 29.7% of all households were made up of individuals, and 18.7% had someone living alone who was 65 years of age or older. The average household size was 2.35 and the average family size was 2.91.

23.5% were under the age of 18, 7.4% from 18 to 24, 21.5% from 25 to 44, 21.5% from 45 to 64, and 26.2% were 65 years of age or older. The median age was 43 years. For every 100 females, there were 84.2 males. For every 100 females age 18 and over, there were 82.4 males.

The median income for a household in the city was $35,455, and the median income for a family was $42,946. Males had a median income of $29,000 versus $21,406 for females. The per capita income for the city was $16,187. About 0.8% of families and 4.7% of the population were below the poverty line, including none of those under age 18 and 15.2% of those age 65 or over.

== Education ==
Edgewood–Colesburg Community School District operates public schools.

== Events ==
The city and chamber of commerce host an annual rodeo, the Edgewood Rodeo Days, which includes events put on by the Professional Rodeo Cowboys Association.

== Notable people ==
- Lloyd Appleton (1906-1999), Wrestler
- Henry Otley Beyer (1883–1966), American anthropologist based in the Philippines.

== See also ==
- Bixby State Preserve
