= Bremen Township, Delaware County, Iowa =

Bremen Township
- Township
- Location in Delaware County
- Coordinates: 42°30′54″N 91°11′19″W
- Country: United States
- State: Iowa
- County: Delaware

Area
  - Total: 36.69 sq mi (95.02 km^{2})
  - Land: 36.67 sq mi (94.98 km^{2})
  - Water: 0.015 sq mi (0.04 km^{2}) 0.04%
- Elevation: 1,020 ft (310 m)

Population (2000)
  - Total: 849
  - Density: 23/sq mi (8.9/km^{2})
- GNIS feature ID: 0467484

Bremen Township is a township in Delaware County, Iowa, United States. As of the 2000 census, its population was 849.

== Geography ==
Bremen Township covers an area of 36.69 square miles (95.02 square kilometers); of this, 0.01 square miles (0.04 square kilometers) or 0.04 percent is water. Lakes in this township include Tegeler Pond.

=== Cities and towns ===
- Dyersville (west quarter)

=== Unincorporated towns ===
- Petersburg

(This list is based on USGS data and may include former settlements.)

=== Adjacent townships ===
- Colony Township (north)
- Liberty Township, Dubuque County (northeast)
- New Wine Township, Dubuque County (east)
- North Fork Township (south)
- Delhi Township (southwest)
- Oneida Township (west)
- Elk Township (northwest)

=== Cemeteries ===
The township contains two cemeteries: Saint Francis and Saint Peter and Paul.

=== Major highways ===
- U.S. Route 20
