= Elk Township, Delaware County, Iowa =

Elk Township
- Township
- Location in Delaware County
- Coordinates: 42°36′16″N 91°18′51″W
- Country: United States
- State: Iowa
- County: Delaware

Area
  - Total: 36.31 sq mi (94.05 km^{2})
  - Land: 36.31 sq mi (94.03 km^{2})
  - Water: 0.0077 sq mi (0.02 km^{2}) 0.02%
- Elevation: 1,053 ft (321 m)

Population (2000)
  - Total: 626
  - Density: 17/sq mi (6.7/km^{2})
- GNIS feature ID: 0467777

Elk Township is a township in Delaware County, Iowa, United States. As of the 2000 census, its population was 626.

== Geography ==
Elk Township covers an area of 36.31 square miles (94.05 square kilometers); of this, 0.01 square miles (0.02 square kilometers) or 0.02 percent is water. The streams of Fountain Springs Creek, Odell Branch and Schechtman Branch run through this township.

=== Cities and towns ===
- Greeley

=== Adjacent townships ===
- Elk Township, Clayton County (north)
- Mallory Township, Clayton County (northeast)
- Colony Township (east)
- Bremen Township (southeast)
- Oneida Township (south)
- Delaware Township (southwest)
- Honey Creek Township (west)
- Lodomillo Township, Clayton County (northwest)

=== Cemeteries ===
The township contains two cemeteries: Grant View and Saint Joseph's.
