= Clayton Township, Clayton County, Iowa =

Township in Iowa, US

Clayton Township
- Township
- Location in Clayton County
- Coordinates: 42°54′53″N 091°10′04″W
- Country: United States
- State: Iowa
- County: Clayton

Area
  - Total: 38.29 sq mi (99.17 km^{2})
  - Land: 34.74 sq mi (89.98 km^{2})
  - Water: 3.54 sq mi (9.18 km^{2}) 9.26%
- Elevation: 778 ft (237 m)

Population (2000)
  - Total: 312
  - Density: 9.1/sq mi (3.5/km^{2})
- GNIS feature ID: 0467613

Clayton Township is a township in Clayton County, Iowa, United States. As of the 2000 census, its population was 312.

== History ==
Clayton Township was named for John M. Clayton, as was Clayton County.

== Geography ==
Clayton Township covers an area of 38.29 square miles (99.2 km^{2}) and contains one incorporated settlement, Clayton. According to the USGS, it contains four cemeteries: Clayton, Evangelical Lutheran, Norsk Lutheran and Tangeman.

The streams of Moody Run and Sny Magill Creek run through this township.
