= Highland, Iowa =

- Unincorporated community
- Location within Iowa Location within the United States
- Coordinates: 42.8938712°N 91.5970934°W
- Country: United States
- State: Iowa
- County: Clayton
- Elevation: 1,175 ft (358 m)
- Time zone: UTC-6 (Central (CST))
  - Summer (DST): UTC-5 (CDT)
- Area code: 563
- GNIS feature ID: 464579

Highland is an unincorporated community in Clayton County, Iowa, United States. The county seat of Elkader lies approximately 10 miles to the southeast.

== History ==
Founded in the 1800s, Highland's population was 12 in 1902.
