= Honey Creek Township, Delaware County, Iowa =

Honey Creek Township
- Township
- Location in Delaware County
- Coordinates: 42°35′59″N 91°26′16″W
- Country: United States
- State: Iowa
- County: Delaware

Area
  - Total: 36.46 sq mi (94.43 km^{2})
  - Land: 36.46 sq mi (94.43 km^{2})
  - Water: 0 sq mi (0 km^{2}) 0%
- Elevation: 1,047 ft (319 m)

Population (2000)
  - Total: 1,060
  - Density: 29/sq mi (11.2/km^{2})
- GNIS feature ID: 0468051

Honey Creek Township is a township in Delaware County, Iowa, United States. As of the 2000 census, its population was 1,060.

== Geography ==
Honey Creek Township covers an area of 36.46 square miles (94.43 square kilometers). The stream of Routherford Branch runs through this township.

=== Cities and towns ===
- Edgewood (south half)

Edgewood is divided by Iowa Highway 3; the north half of the town is in Lodomillo Township, Clayton County.

=== Unincorporated towns ===
- Thorpe
- York

(This list is based on USGS data and may include former settlements.)

=== Adjacent townships ===
- Lodomillo Township, Clayton County (north)
- Elk Township, Clayton County (northeast)
- Elk Township (east)
- Oneida Township (southeast)
- Delaware Township (south)
- Coffins Grove Township (southwest)
- Richland Township (west)
- Cass Township, Clayton County (northwest)

=== Cemeteries ===
The township contains five cemeteries: Edgewood, Hutson, Roe, Saint Marks and Thorpe Union.

=== Major highways ===
- Iowa Highway 3
- Iowa Highway 13
