= Union Township, Fayette County, Iowa =

Township in Iowa, USA

Union Township
- Township
- Location in Fayette County
- Coordinates: 42°57′13″N 91°47′14″W
- Country: United States
- State: Iowa
- County: Fayette

Area
  - Total: 33.7 sq mi (87.2 km^{2})
  - Land: 33.7 sq mi (87.2 km^{2})
  - Water: 0 sq mi (0 km^{2}) 0%
- Elevation: 1,125 ft (343 m)

Population (2010)
  - Total: 412
  - Density: 12.2/sq mi (4.72/km^{2})
- Time zone: UTC-6 (CST)
  - Summer (DST): UTC-5 (CDT)
- ZIP codes: 52135, 52141, 52142, 52175
- GNIS feature ID: 0468820

Union Township is one of twenty townships in Fayette County, Iowa, United States. As of the 2010 census, its population was 412.

It was previously called West Union township.

== Geography ==
According to the United States Census Bureau, Union Township covers an area of 33.67 square miles (87.2 square kilometers).

The city of West Union is entirely within this township geographically but is a separate municipality.

=== Adjacent townships ===
- Dover Township (north)
- Clermont Township (northeast)
- Pleasant Valley Township (east)
- Illyria Township (southeast)
- Westfield Township (south)
- Center Township (southwest)
- Windsor Township (west)
- Auburn Township (northwest)

=== Cemeteries ===
The township contains these five cemeteries: Barnhouse, Butler, Mount Calvary, Mount Pleasant and Pleasant Grove.

=== Major highways ===
- U.S. Route 18
- Iowa Highway 56
- Iowa Highway 150

=== Airports and landing strips ===
- George L Scott Municipal Airport
- Scott Field Municipal Airport

=== Landmarks ===
- Echo Valley State Park
- Volga River State Recreation Area (partial)

== School districts ==
- North Fayette Valley Community School District

== Political districts ==
- Iowa's 1st congressional district
- State House District 18
- State Senate District 9
