= Boardman Township, Clayton County, Iowa =

Township in Iowa, US

Boardman Township
- Township
- Location in Clayton County
- Coordinates: 42°51′44″N 091°25′29″W
- Country: United States
- State: Iowa
- County: Clayton

Area
  - Total: 36.45 sq mi (94.41 km^{2})
  - Land: 36.45 sq mi (94.41 km^{2})
  - Water: 0 sq mi (0 km^{2}) 0%
- Elevation: 741 ft (226 m)

Population (2000)
  - Total: 1,832
  - Density: 50/sq mi (19.4/km^{2})
- GNIS feature ID: 0467471

Boardman Township is a township in Clayton County, Iowa, United States. As of the 2000 census, its population was 1,832.

== History ==
Boardman Township is named for Elisha Boardman, who settled there in 1836.

== Geography ==
Boardman Township covers an area of 36.45 square miles (94.4 km^{2}) and contains one incorporated settlement, Elkader (the county seat). According to the USGS, it contains three cemeteries: Eastside, Erhardt and Saint Josephs.

The streams of Dry Mill Creek and Roberts Creek run through this township.

== Transportation ==
Boardman Township contains Elkader Municipal Airport.
