= Wagner Township, Clayton County, Iowa =

Township in Iowa, US

Wagner Township
- Township
- Location in Clayton County
- Coordinates: 42°57′25″N 091°25′45″W
- Country: United States
- State: Iowa
- County: Clayton

Area
  - Total: 36.44 sq mi (94.37 km^{2})
  - Land: 36.44 sq mi (94.37 km^{2})
  - Water: 0 sq mi (0 km^{2}) 0%
- Elevation: 981 ft (299 m)

Population (2000)
  - Total: 441
  - Density: 12/sq mi (4.7/km^{2})
- GNIS feature ID: 0468878

Wagner Township is a township in Clayton County, Iowa, United States. As of the 2000 census, its population was 441.

== History ==
Wagner Township was organized in 1852. It is named for John Wagner, Sr., who settled there in 1846.

== Geography ==
Wagner Township covers an area of 36.44 square miles (94.4 km^{2}) and contains one incorporated settlement, St. Olaf. According to the USGS, it contains nine cemeteries: Clark, Eno, Farmersburg-Wagner, Gooding, Johanningmeier, Norway, Patterson, United Brethren and Weymouth.

The streams of Howard Creek, Silver Creek and Wagner run through this township.
