= Volga Township, Clayton County, Iowa =

Township in Iowa, US

Volga Township
- Township
- Location in Clayton County
- Coordinates: 42°46′13″N 091°18′13″W
- Country: United States
- State: Iowa
- County: Clayton

Area
  - Total: 39.03 sq mi (101.09 km^{2})
  - Land: 39.03 sq mi (101.09 km^{2})
  - Water: 0 sq mi (0 km^{2}) 0%
- Elevation: 830 ft (253 m)

Population (2000)
  - Total: 551
  - Density: 14/sq mi (5.5/km^{2})
- GNIS feature ID: 0468876

Volga Township is a township in Clayton County, Iowa, United States. As of the 2000 census, its population was 551.

== History ==
Volga Township was named from the Volga River (Iowa), which in turn was named after the Volga River in Russia.

== Geography ==
Volga Township covers an area of 39.03 square miles (101.1 km^{2}) and contains two incorporated settlements: Elkport and Garber. According to the USGS, it contains ten cemeteries: Blanchaine, Communia, Eberhard, Hartshey, Immanuel Lutheran, Krumm, Musfeldt, Old Garber, Saint Michaels and Wolf.

The streams of Bear Creek, Doe Creek, Elk Creek, Honey Creek, Panther Creek, Volga River and Wayman Creek run through this township.
