= Buena Vista Township, Clayton County, Iowa =

Township in Iowa, US

Buena Vista Township
- Township
- Location in Clayton County
- Coordinates: 42°40′27″N 090°57′59″W
- Country: United States
- State: Iowa
- County: Clayton

Area
  - Total: 19.88 sq mi (51.48 km^{2})
  - Land: 17.83 sq mi (46.18 km^{2})
  - Water: 2.0 sq mi (5.3 km^{2}) 10.3%
- Elevation: 679 ft (207 m)

Population (2000)
  - Total: 339
  - Density: 19/sq mi (7.3/km^{2})
- GNIS feature ID: 0467499

Buena Vista Township is a township in Clayton County, Iowa, United States. As of the 2000 census, its population was 339.

== History ==
Buena Vista Township is named from the Battle of Buena Vista in the Mexican–American War.

== Geography ==
Buena Vista Township covers an area of 19.88 square miles (51.5 km^{2}) and contains one incorporated settlement, North Buena Vista. According to the USGS, it contains three cemeteries: Buena Vista, Immaculate Conception and North Buena Vista.

Dead Lake, Spring Lake and Wachendorf Lake are within this township. The streams of Picayune Chute and Turkey River run through this township.
