= Westfield Township, Fayette County, Iowa =

Westfield Township
- Township
- Location in Fayette County
- Coordinates: 42°52′17″N 91°47′10″W
- Country: United States
- State: Iowa
- County: Fayette

Area
  - Total: 35.4 sq mi (91.7 km^{2})
  - Land: 35.15 sq mi (91.05 km^{2})
  - Water: 0.25 sq mi (0.65 km^{2}) 0.71%
- Elevation: 1,138 ft (347 m)

Population (2010)
  - Total: 297
  - Density: 8.45/sq mi (3.26/km^{2})
- Time zone: UTC-6 (CST)
  - Summer (DST): UTC-5 (CDT)
- ZIP codes: 52141, 52142, 52164, 52169, 52175
- GNIS feature ID: 0468975

Westfield Township is one of twenty townships in Fayette County, Iowa, United States. As of the 2010 census, its population was 297.

== History ==
Westfield Township was at one point home to a sizable African American population in the 1850s, with origins from Illinois. Three years after moving to Westfield Township, the farming community numbered 59 persons of color.

== Geography ==
According to the United States Census Bureau, Westfield Township covers an area of 35.4 square miles (91.7 square kilometers); of this, 35.15 square miles (91.05 square kilometers, 99.29 percent) is land and 0.25 square miles (0.65 square kilometers, 0.71 percent) is water.

The city of Fayette is entirely within this township geographically but is a separate entity.

=== Unincorporated towns ===
- Albany at 42.865814°N 91.758771°W
- Lima at 42.868314°N 91.742937°W

(This list is based on USGS data and may include former settlements.)

=== Adjacent townships ===
- Union Township (north)
- Pleasant Valley Township (northeast)
- Illyria Township (east)
- Fairfield Township (southeast)
- Smithfield Township (south)
- Harlan Township (southwest)
- Center Township (west)
- Windsor Township (northwest)

=== Cemeteries ===
The township contains these three cemeteries: Lima, Pleasant Hill and Saint Francis.

=== Major highways ===
- Iowa Highway 93
- Iowa Highway 150

=== Lakes ===
- Volga Lake

=== Landmarks ===
- Volga River State Recreation Area (vast majority)

== School districts ==
- North Fayette Valley Community School District
- West Central Community School District

== Political districts ==
- Iowa's 1st congressional district
- State House District 24
- State Senate District 12
