= Cox Creek Township, Clayton County, Iowa =

Township in Iowa, US

Cox Creek Township
- Township
- Location in Clayton County
- Coordinates: 42°46′16″N 091°25′35″W
- Country: United States
- State: Iowa
- County: Clayton

Area
  - Total: 36.79 sq mi (95.28 km^{2})
  - Land: 36.79 sq mi (95.28 km^{2})
  - Water: 0 sq mi (0 km^{2}) 0%
- Elevation: 850 ft (260 m)

Population (2000)
  - Total: 348
  - Density: 9.6/sq mi (3.7/km^{2})
- GNIS feature ID: 0467661

Cox Creek Township is a township in Clayton County, Iowa, United States. As of the 2000 census, its population was 348.

== History ==
Cox Creek Township is named for Phillip Cox, who settled there in 1842.

== Geography ==
Cox Creek Township covers an area of 36.79 square miles (95.3 km^{2}) and contains one incorporated settlement, Littleport. According to the USGS, it contains ten cemeteries: Cords, Dohrer, Hartmann, Mederville, Meyer, Osborne, Sacred Heart, Schmidt, Union and Watkins.

The stream of Cox Creek runs through this township.
