= Jefferson Township, Clayton County, Iowa =

Township in Iowa, US

Jefferson Township
- Township
- Location in Clayton County
- Coordinates: 42°46′57″N 091°08′00″W
- Country: United States
- State: Iowa
- County: Clayton

Area
  - Total: 57.46 sq mi (148.83 km^{2})
  - Land: 50.95 sq mi (131.97 km^{2})
  - Water: 6.51 sq mi (16.86 km^{2}) 11.33%
- Elevation: 899 ft (274 m)

Population (2000)
  - Total: 2,721
  - Density: 53/sq mi (20.6/km^{2})
- GNIS feature ID: 0468132

Jefferson Township is a township in Clayton County, Iowa, United States. As of the 2000 census, its population was 2,721.

== Geography ==
Jefferson Township covers an area of 57.47 square miles (148.8 km^{2}) and contains one incorporated settlement, Guttenberg. According to the USGS, it contains nine cemeteries: Borcherding, Guttenberg, Lewis, Mount Olivet, Saint Johns, Saint Marys, Saint Michael, Saint Pauls and Stock School.

Frenchtown Lake is within this township. The streams of Buck Creek, Carlan Creek, Miners Creek, Price Branch and South Cedar Creek run through this township.

== Transportation ==
Jefferson Township contains three airports or landing strips: Abels Island Airport, GAA Private Airport and Walters Heliport.
