= Grand Meadow Township, Clayton County, Iowa =

Township in Iowa, US

Grand Meadow Township
- Township
- Location in Clayton County
- Coordinates: 43°01′57″N 091°32′36″W
- Country: United States
- State: Iowa
- County: Clayton

Area
  - Total: 36.13 sq mi (93.57 km^{2})
  - Land: 36.13 sq mi (93.57 km^{2})
  - Water: 0 sq mi (0 km^{2}) 0%
- Elevation: 1,145 ft (349 m)

Population (United States Census 2023)
  - Total: 614
  - Density: 16/sq mi (6/km^{2})
- GNIS feature ID: 0467922

Grand Meadow Township is a township in Clayton County, Iowa, United States. As of 2023, United States Census reported the township's population was 614.

== History ==
Grand Meadow Township was originally settled chiefly by Norwegian immigrants.

== Geography ==
Grand Meadow Township covers an area of 36.13 square miles (93.6 km^{2}) and contains no incorporated settlements. According to the USGS, it contains four cemeteries: East Clermont Lutheran, Fry, Grand Meadow and Postville.
