= Highland Township, Clayton County, Iowa =

Township in Iowa, US

Highland Township
- Township
- Location in Clayton County
- Coordinates: 42°51′48″N 091°33′35″W
- Country: United States
- State: Iowa
- County: Clayton

Area
  - Total: 36.16 sq mi (93.66 km^{2})
  - Land: 36.16 sq mi (93.65 km^{2})
  - Water: 0.0039 sq mi (0.01 km^{2}) 0.01%
- Elevation: 1,007 ft (307 m)

Population (United States Census 2023 estimate)
  - Total: 138
  - Density: 6.5/sq mi (2.5/km^{2})
- GNIS feature ID: 0468034

Highland Township is a township in Clayton County, Iowa, United States. As of the United States Census's 2023 estimate, its population was 138.

== Geography ==
Highland Township covers an area of 36.16 square miles (93.7 km^{2}) and contains only the unincorporated settlement of Highland. According to the USGS, it contains two cemeteries: Duff and Highland Lutheran.
