= Oneida Township, Delaware County, Iowa =

Oneida Township
- Township
- Location in Delaware County
- Coordinates: 42°30′56″N 91°18′36″W
- Country: United States
- State: Iowa
- County: Delaware

Area
  - Total: 36.63 sq mi (94.87 km^{2})
  - Land: 36.63 sq mi (94.87 km^{2})
  - Water: 0 sq mi (0 km^{2}) 0%
- Elevation: 1,020 ft (311 m)

Population (2020)
  - Total: 1,403
  - Density: 38/sq mi (14.8/km^{2})
- GNIS feature ID: 0468465

Oneida Township is a township in Delaware County, Iowa, United States. As of the 2020 census, its population was 1,403.

== Geography ==
Oneida Township covers an area of 36.63 square miles (94.87 square kilometers). This township is traversed by the streams Almoral Branch and Garretts Branch.

=== Cities and towns ===
- Delaware (north three-quarters)
- Earlville

=== Unincorporated towns ===
- Almoral
- Almoral Siding (historical)
- Oneida

(This list is based on USGS data and may include former settlements.)

=== Adjacent townships ===
- Elk Township (north)
- Colony Township (northeast)
- Bremen Township (east)
- Delhi Township (south)
- Milo Township (southwest)
- Delaware Township (west)
- Honey Creek Township (northwest)

=== Cemeteries ===
The township contains three cemeteries: Fairview, Pine View and Saint Josephs.

=== Major highways ===
- U.S. Route 20
