= Fremont Township, Buchanan County, Iowa =

Township in Iowa, US

Fremont Township, Buchanan County
- Township
- Coordinates: 42°30′44″N 091°40′05″W
- Country: United States
- State: Iowa
- County: Buchanan

Area
  - Total: 36.54 sq mi (94.64 km^{2})
  - Land: 36.54 sq mi (94.64 km^{2})
  - Water: 0 sq mi (0 km^{2})
- Elevation: 1,030 ft (314 m)

Population (2000)
  - Total: 271
  - Density: 7.5/sq mi (2.9/km^{2})
- FIPS code: 19-91461
- GNIS feature ID: 0467874

Fremont Township is one of sixteen townships in Buchanan County, Iowa, United States. As of the 2000 census, its population was 271.

== Geography ==
Fremont Township covers an area of 36.54 square miles (94.6 km^{2}) and contains no incorporated settlements. According to the USGS, it contains one cemetery, Fremont.
