= Bloomfield Township, Winneshiek County, Iowa =

Township in Winneshiek County, Iowa

Coordinates: 43.1286°N 91.6669°W

Bloomfield Township is a township in Winneshiek County, Iowa, United States.
