= Osterdock, Iowa =

- City
- Location of Osterdock, Iowa
- Coordinates: 42°43′53″N 91°09′31″W
- Country: United States
- State: Iowa
- County: Clayton
- Incorporated: April 16, 1904

Area
  - Total: 0.39 sq mi (1.02 km^{2})
  - Land: 0.39 sq mi (1.02 km^{2})
  - Water: 0 sq mi (0.00 km^{2})
- Elevation: 637 ft (194 m)

Population (2020)
  - Total: 43
  - Density: 108.8/sq mi (42.02/km^{2})
- Time zone: UTC-6 (Central (CST))
  - Summer (DST): UTC-5 (CDT)
- Zip Code: 52052
- Area code: 563
- FIPS code: 19-60015
- GNIS feature ID: 2396100

Osterdock is a city located in Clayton County, Iowa, United States. As of the 2020 census, the city had a total population of 43, down from 50 in 2000.

== History ==
Osterdock got its start in the year 1877, following construction of the railroad through that territory.

== Geography ==
According to the United States Census Bureau, the city has a total area of 0.46 square miles (1.19 km^{2}), all land.

== Demographics ==
Historical populations
Year	Pop.	±%
1910	97	—
1920	103	+6.2%
1930	92	−10.7%
1940	78	−15.2%
1950	51	−34.6%
1960	45	−11.8%
1970	59	+31.1%
1980	35	−40.7%
1990	49	+40.0%
2000	50	+2.0%
2010	59	+18.0%
2020	43	−27.1%
Source:"U.S. Census website". United States Census Bureau. and Iowa Data Center; Source: U.S. Decennial Census

=== 2020 census ===
As of the census of 2020, there were 43 people, 19 households, and 15 families residing in the city. The population density was 108.8 inhabitants per square mile (42.0/km^{2}). There were 19 housing units at an average density of 48.1 per square mile (18.6/km^{2}). The racial makeup of the city was 95.3% White, 0.0% Black or African American, 0.0% Native American, 0.0% Asian, 0.0% Pacific Islander, 2.3% from other races and 2.3% from two or more races. Hispanic or Latino persons of any race comprised 4.7% of the population.

Of the 19 households, 47.4% of which had children under the age of 18 living with them, 52.6% were married couples living together, 0.0% were cohabitating couples, 15.8% had a female householder with no spouse or partner present and 31.6% had a male householder with no spouse or partner present. 21.1% of all households were non-families. 21.1% of all households were made up of individuals, 10.5% had someone living alone who was 65 years old or older.

The median age in the city was 43.2 years. 27.9% of the residents were under the age of 20; 4.7% were between the ages of 20 and 24; 23.3% were from 25 and 44; 14.0% were from 45 and 64; and 30.2% were 65 years of age or older. The gender makeup of the city was 55.8% male and 44.2% female.

=== 2010 census ===
As of the census of 2010, there were 59 people, 23 households, and 16 families living in the city. The population density was 128.3 inhabitants per square mile (49.5/km^{2}). There were 23 housing units at an average density of 50.0 per square mile (19.3/km^{2}). The racial makeup of the city was 94.9% White and 5.1% from two or more races. Hispanic or Latino of any race were 3.4% of the population.

There were 23 households, of which 26.1% had children under the age of 18 living with them, 60.9% were married couples living together, 4.3% had a female householder with no husband present, 4.3% had a male householder with no wife present, and 30.4% were non-families. 26.1% of all households were made up of individuals, and 8.7% had someone living alone who was 65 years of age or older. The average household size was 2.57 and the average family size was 3.00.

The median age in the city was 50.3 years. 20.3% of residents were under the age of 18; 6.9% were between the ages of 18 and 24; 13.6% were from 25 to 44; 44.1% were from 45 to 64; and 15.3% were 65 years of age or older. The gender makeup of the city was 42.4% male and 57.6% female.

=== 2000 census ===
As of the census of 2000, there were 50 people, 21 households, and 16 families living in the city. The population density was 109.9 inhabitants per square mile (42.4/km^{2}). There were 21 housing units at an average density of 46.2 per square mile (17.8/km^{2}). The racial makeup of the city was 100.00% White.

There were 21 households, out of which 23.8% had children under the age of 18 living with them, 76.2% were married couples living together, and 23.8% were non-families. 23.8% of all households were made up of individuals, and 9.5% had someone living alone who was 65 years of age or older. The average household size was 2.38 and the average family size was 2.81.

In the city, the population was spread out, with 20.0% under the age of 18, 6.0% from 18 to 24, 28.0% from 25 to 44, 38.0% from 45 to 64, and 8.0% who were 65 years of age or older. The median age was 43 years. For every 100 females, there were 108.3 males. For every 100 females age 18 and over, there were 150.0 males.

The median income for a household in the city was $31,250, and the median income for a family was $46,250. Males had a median income of $40,625 versus $18,750 for females. The per capita income for the city was $18,566. 26.0% of the population and 27.8% of families were below the poverty line. Out of the total population, none of those under the age of 18 and 36.4% of those 65 and older were living below the poverty line.

== Education ==
Public schools are operated by the Clayton Ridge Community School District, which formed in 2005 in the merger of the Guttenberg Community School District and the Garnavillo Community School District.

== Notable person ==
- William Smith, Mormon leader
