= Delaware Township, Delaware County, Iowa =

Delaware Township
- Township
- Location in Delaware County
- Coordinates: 42°30′47″N 91°25′58″W
- Country: United States
- State: Iowa
- County: Delaware

Area
  - Total: 36.64 sq mi (94.89 km^{2})
  - Land: 36.44 sq mi (94.39 km^{2})
  - Water: 0.19 sq mi (0.5 km^{2}) 0.53%
- Elevation: 1,020 ft (311 m)

Population (2000)
  - Total: 6,294
  - Density: 173/sq mi (66.7/km^{2})
- GNIS feature ID: 0467698

Delaware Township is a township in Delaware County, Iowa, USA. As of the 2000 census, its population was 6,294.

== Geography ==
Delaware Township covers an area of 36.64 square miles (94.89 square kilometers); of this, 0.19 square miles (0.5 square kilometers) or 0.53 percent is water. The streams of Coffins Creek, Honey Creek, Lindsey Creek and Rieger Creek run through this township.

=== Cities and towns ===
- Manchester (vast majority)

=== Unincorporated towns ===
- Dutchtown
- Orchard Lane Mobile Home Court

(This list is based on USGS data and may include former settlements.)

=== Adjacent townships ===
- Honey Creek Township (north)
- Elk Township (northeast)
- Oneida Township (east)
- Milo Township (south)
- Prairie Township (southwest)
- Coffins Grove Township (west)
- Richland Township (northwest)

=== Cemeteries ===
The township contains four cemeteries: Mead, Oakland, Rock Prairie and Saint Marys.

=== Major highways ===
- U.S. Route 20

== Sources ==
- U.S. Board on Geographic Names (GNIS)
- United States Census Bureau cartographic boundary files
