= Iowa Highway 187 =

State highway in Iowa, United States

Iowa Highway 187
- Iowa 187 highlighted in red

Route information
- Maintained by Iowa DOT
- Length: 28.385 mi (45.681 km)
- Existed: January 1931–present

Major junctions
- South end: US 20 southwest of Masonville
- Iowa 3 southeast of Arlington
- North end: Iowa 150 south of Fayette

Location
- Country: United States
- State: Iowa
- Counties: Buchanan; Fayette

Highway system
- Iowa Primary Highway System; Interstate; US; State; Secondary; Scenic
← Iowa 182	→ Iowa 188
← Iowa 152	Iowa 154	→ Iowa 156

Iowa Highway 187 (Iowa 187) is a highway in northeastern Iowa. It begins at U.S. Highway 20 (US 20) southwest of Masonville and ends at Iowa 150 south of Fayette.

== Route description ==
Iowa Highway 187 begins at an intersection with US 20 southwest of Masonville. It heads in a northward alignment from this point, passing through Lamont. North of Lamont, it intersects with Iowa 3 before turning to the northwest. The highway passes through Arlington before turning directly to the west. Further west, it will turn to the north where it will terminate at an intersection with Iowa 150 south of Fayette.

== History ==
Iowa 187 was formed in January 1931. Originally, the highway began at an intersection with US 20 four miles (6.4 km) east of Winthrop. It headed north along a section line to Lamont. Just north of Lamont, the highway curved to the east and crossed into Delaware County. Shortly thereafter, the highway ended at the western gate of Backbone State Park. The roadway maintained this configuration until July 1, 1980, when the east–west portion was turned over to the counties and Iowa 187 was rerouted north to the intersection between Iowa 3 and Iowa 154. For a short time, both Iowa 187 and Iowa 154 ended at opposite sides of the same intersection, but Iowa 187 subsumed all of Iowa 154 by 1983.

== Major intersections ==
County	Location	mi	km	Destinations	Notes
Buchanan	Middlefield Township	0.000	0.000	US 20 – Waterloo, Dubuque	Interchange
Fayette	Putnam Township	15.570	25.057	Iowa 3 – Strawberry Point, Oelwein	Roundabout
Fayette	Smith Township	28.385	45.681	Iowa 150 – Maynard, Fayette	
1.000 mi = 1.609 km; 1.000 km = 0.621 mi
