= Mallory Township, Clayton County, Iowa =

Township in Iowa, US

Mallory Township
- Township
- Location in Clayton County
- Coordinates: 42°41′31″N 091°11′26″W
- Country: United States
- State: Iowa
- County: Clayton

Area
  - Total: 35.98 sq mi (93.19 km^{2})
  - Land: 35.98 sq mi (93.18 km^{2})
  - Water: 0.0039 sq mi (0.01 km^{2}) 0.01%
- Elevation: 1,180 ft (360 m)

Population (2010)
  - Total: 391
  - Density: 11/sq mi (4.2/km^{2})
- GNIS feature ID: 0468336

Mallory Township is a township in Clayton County, Iowa, United States. At the 2010 census, its population was 395, down from 411 ten years earlier.

== Geography ==
Mallory Township covers an area of 35.98 square miles (93.2 km^{2}) and contains one incorporated settlement, Osterdock. According to the USGS, it contains seven cemeteries: Bethel, Bolsinger, Brown, Hansel, King, Koenig and Noggle.

The streams of Joles Creek, Mill Creek and Peck Creek run through this township.

== Bibliography ==
- USGS Geographic Names Information System (GNIS)
