= Marion Township, Clayton County, Iowa =

Township in Iowa, US

Marion Township
- Township
- Location in Clayton County
- Coordinates: 42°57′09″N 091°32′47″W
- Country: United States
- State: Iowa
- County: Clayton

Area
  - Total: 35.87 sq mi (92.89 km^{2})
  - Land: 35.87 sq mi (92.89 km^{2})
  - Water: 0 sq mi (0 km^{2}) 0%
- Elevation: 958 ft (292 m)

Population (2000)
  - Total: 389
  - Density: 11/sq mi (4.2/km^{2})
- GNIS feature ID: 0468349

Marion Township is a township in Clayton County, Iowa, United States. As of the 2000 census, its population was 389.

== Geography ==
Marion Township covers an area of 35.87 square miles (92.9 km^{2}) and contains no incorporated settlements. According to the USGS, it contains five cemeteries: Apostolic, Cook, Houg, Marion Lutheran and Mork.

The streams of Deer Creek and Sand Creek run through this township.
