= Sperry Township, Clayton County, Iowa =

Township in Iowa, US

Sperry Township
- Township
- Location in Clayton County
- Coordinates: 42°46′40″N 091°32′21″W
- Country: United States
- State: Iowa
- County: Clayton

Area
  - Total: 36.38 sq mi (94.22 km^{2})
  - Land: 36.37 sq mi (94.19 km^{2})
  - Water: 0.0077 sq mi (0.02 km^{2}) 0.02%
- Elevation: 1,093 ft (333 m)

Population (2000)
  - Total: 534
  - Density: 15/sq mi (5.7/km^{2})
- GNIS feature ID: 0468733

Sperry Township is a township in Clayton County, Iowa, United States. As of the 2000 census, its population was 534.

== Geography ==
Sperry Township covers an area of 36.38 square miles (94.2 km^{2}) and contains one incorporated settlement, Volga. According to the USGS, it contains seven cemeteries: Reeds, Ross, Rothfusz, Sacred Heart - Schoolhouse Yard, Sacred Heart, Saint Sebald Lutheran and Stone School.

The streams of Coon Creek, Ensign Creek, Hewett Creek, Kleinlein Creek, Pine Creek and Wolf Creek run through this township.
