= Clayton County, Iowa =

County in Iowa, United States

- County
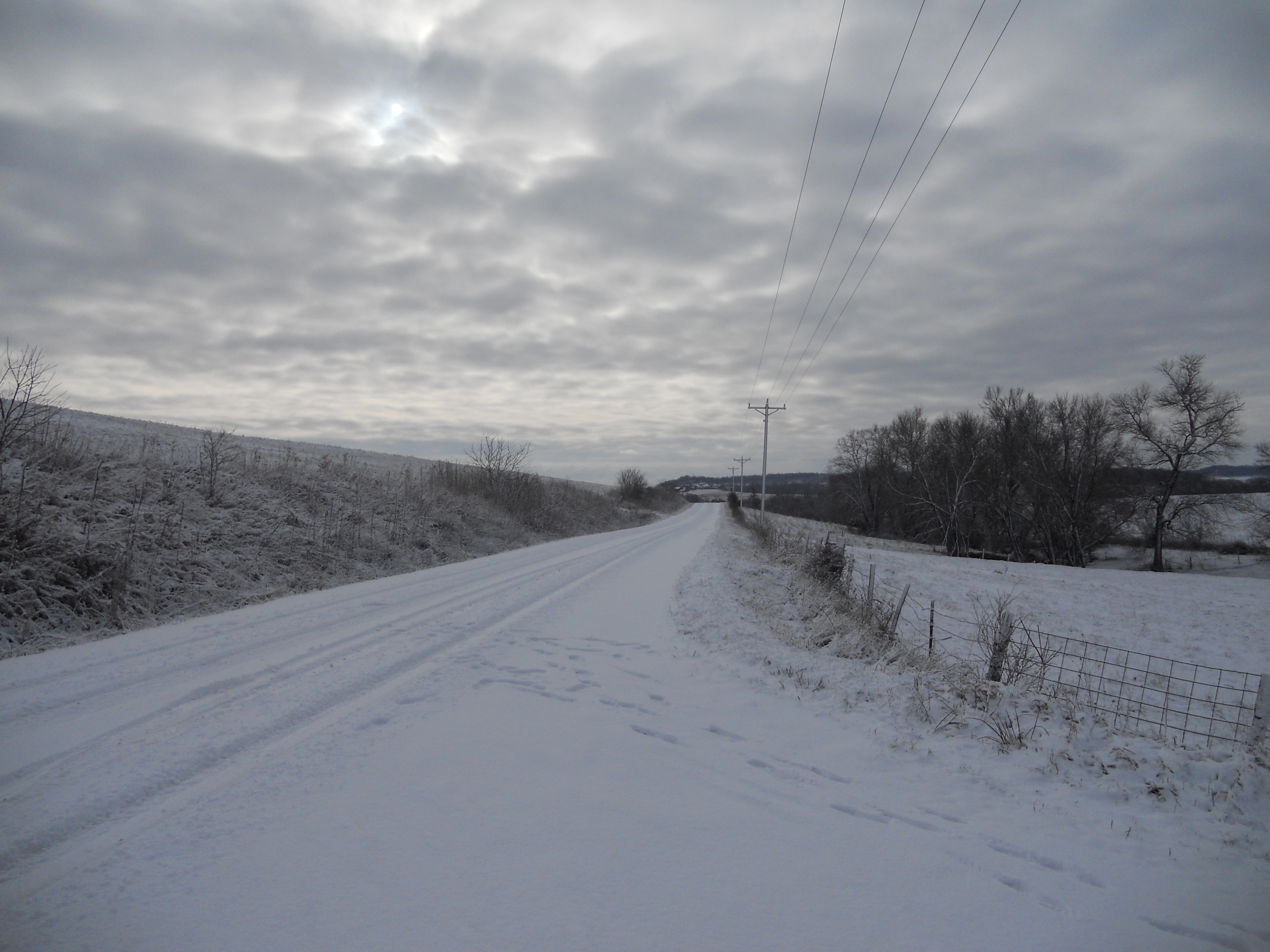
- Winter scene near Elkader

- Location within the U.S. state of Iowa
- Coordinates: 42.840985°N 91.323576°W
- Country: United States
- State: Iowa
- Founded: December 21, 1837
- Named for: John M. Clayton
- Seat: Elkader
- Largest city: Guttenberg

Area
  - Total: 792.631 sq mi (2,052.90 km^{2})
  - Land: 778.464 sq mi (2,016.21 km^{2})
  - Water: 14.167 sq mi (36.69 km^{2}) 1.79%

Population (2020)
  - Total: 17,043
  - Estimate (2025): 16,845 ▼
  - Density: 21.893/sq mi (8.4530/km^{2})
- Time zone: UTC−6 (Central)
  - Summer (DST): UTC−5 (CDT)
- Area code: 563
- Congressional district: 1st
- Website: claytoncountyia.gov
- Iowa county number 22

Clayton County is a county located in the U.S. state of Iowa. As of the 2020 census, the population was 17,043, and was estimated to be 16,845 in 2025. The county seat is Elkader and the largest city is Guttenberg.

== History ==
The county was formed on December 21, 1837, and was named in honor of John M. Clayton, United States Senator from Delaware and later Secretary of State under President Zachary Taylor.

== Geography ==
Route W68 shield

According to the United States Census Bureau, the county has a total area of 792.631 square miles (2,052.90 km^{2}), of which 778.464 square miles (2,016.21 km^{2}) is land and 14.167 square miles (36.69 km^{2}) (0.4%) is water. It is the 5th largest county in Iowa by total area.

=== Adjacent counties ===
- Allamakee County (north)
- Crawford County, Wisconsin (northeast)
- Grant County, Wisconsin (east)
- Dubuque County (southeast)
- Delaware County (south)
- Buchanan County (southwest)
- Fayette County (west)
- Winneshiek County (northwest)

=== Major highways ===
- U.S. Highway 18
- U.S. Highway 52
- Iowa Highway 3
- Iowa Highway 13
- Iowa Highway 56
- Iowa Highway 76
- Iowa Highway 128

=== National protected areas ===
- Driftless Area National Wildlife Refuge (part)
- Effigy Mounds National Monument (part)
- Upper Mississippi River National Wildlife and Fish Refuge (part)

=== Geology ===
Clayton County is part of the Driftless Area, a region that completely missed being ice-covered during the last ice age. Streams have deeply carved valleys, while the Mississippi River has spectacular bluffs.

== Demographics ==
Historical population
Census	Pop.	Note	%±
1850	3,873		—
1860	20,728		435.2%
1870	27,771		34.0%
1880	28,829		3.8%
1890	26,733		−7.3%
1900	27,750		3.8%
1910	25,576		−7.8%
1920	25,032		−2.1%
1930	24,559		−1.9%
1940	24,334		−0.9%
1950	22,522		−7.4%
1960	21,962		−2.5%
1970	20,606		−6.2%
1980	21,098		2.4%
1990	19,054		−9.7%
2000	18,678		−2.0%
2010	18,129		−2.9%
2020	17,043		−6.0%
2025 (est.)	16,845	▼	−1.2%
U.S. Decennial Census; 1790–1960 1900–1990; 1990–2000 2010–2020

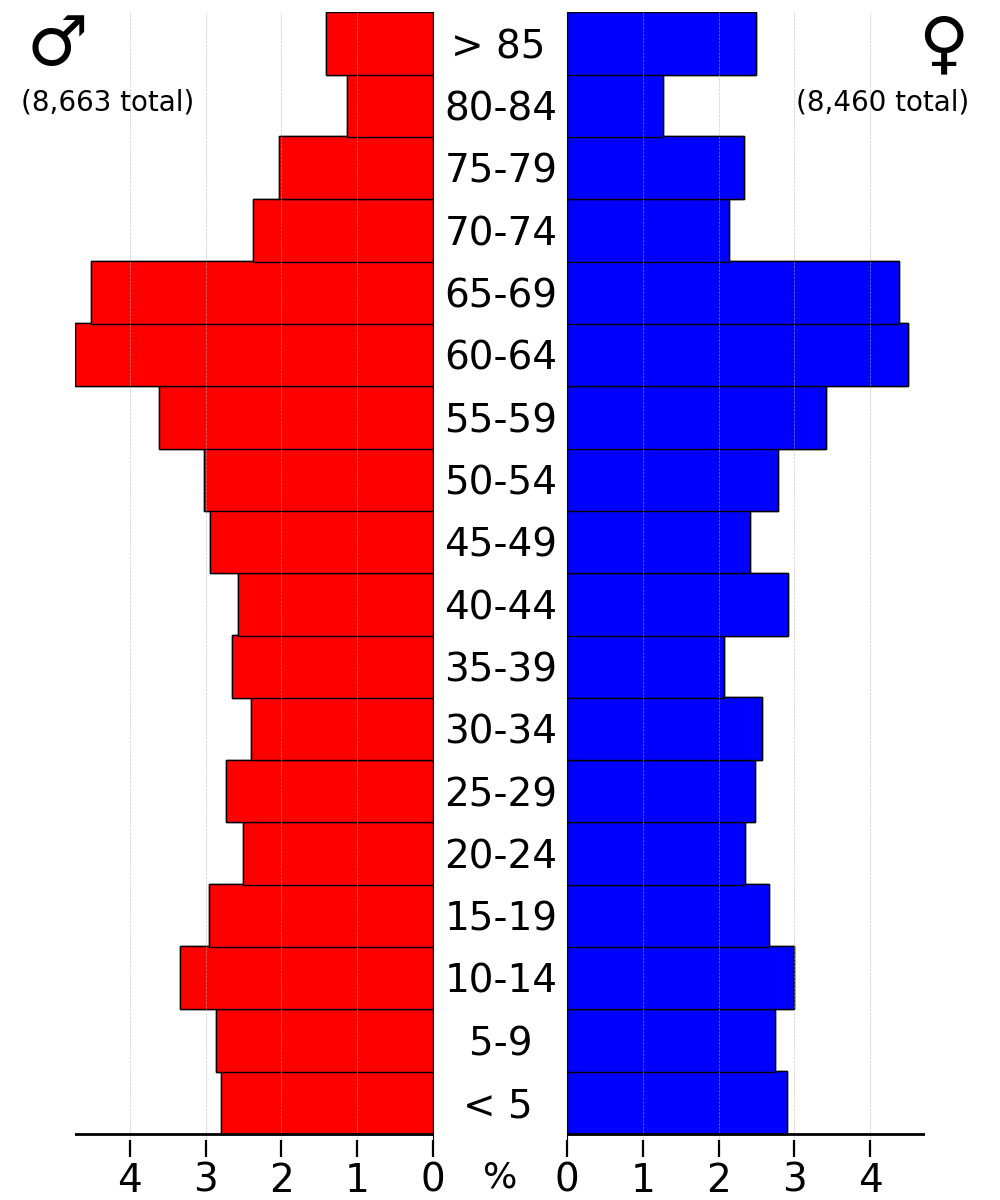
2022 US Census population pyramid for Clayton County from ACS 5-year estimates

=== 2020 census ===
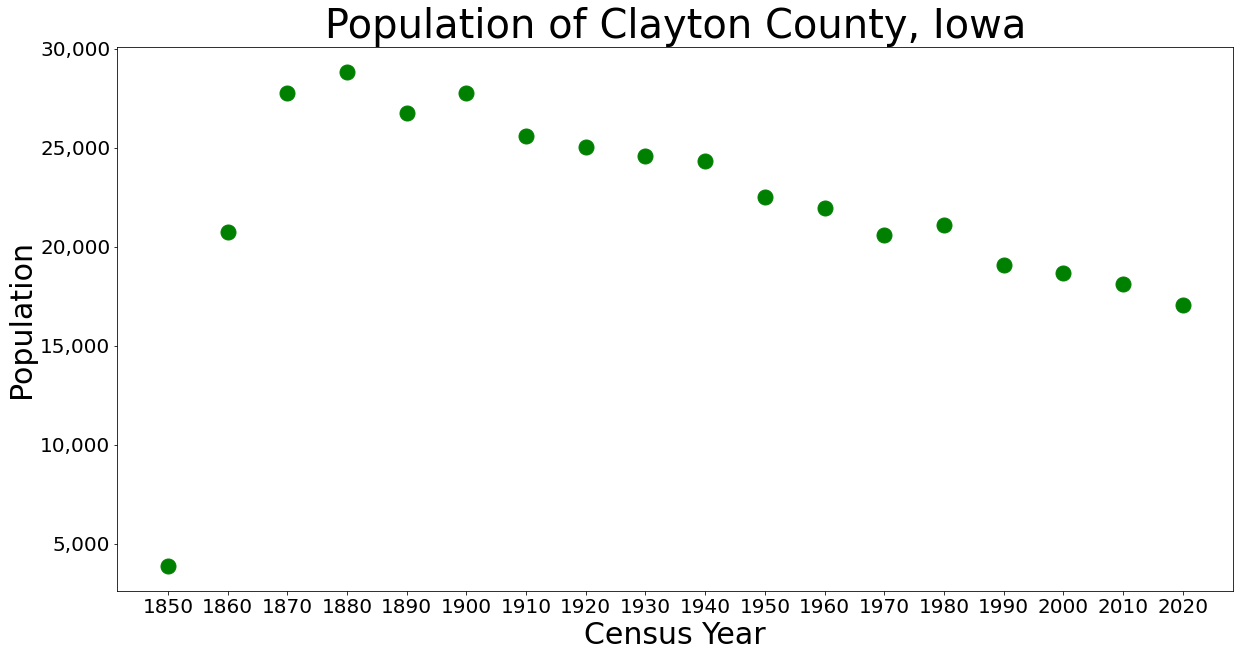
Population of Clayton County from US census data

As of the 2020 census, the county had a population of 17,043 and a population density of 21.5/sq mi (8.3/km^{2}). The median age was 46.7 years; 21.7% of residents were under the age of 18 and 24.2% were 65 years of age or older. For every 100 females there were 102.8 males, and for every 100 females age 18 and over there were 101.5 males age 18 and over.

The racial makeup of the county was 95.2% White, 0.9% Black or African American, 0.3% American Indian and Alaska Native, 0.3% Asian, <0.1% Native Hawaiian and Pacific Islander, 0.8% from some other race, and 2.5% from two or more races. Hispanic or Latino residents of any race comprised 2.0% of the population.

There were 7,315 households in the county, of which 24.2% had children under the age of 18 living in them. Of all households, 52.5% were married-couple households, 20.1% were households with a male householder and no spouse or partner present, and 20.7% were households with a female householder and no spouse or partner present. About 31.3% of all households were made up of individuals and 15.2% had someone living alone who was 65 years of age or older. There were 8,758 housing units, of which 7,315 were occupied, 16.5% were vacant, 77.2% of the occupied units were owner-occupied, and 22.8% were renter-occupied. The homeowner vacancy rate was 2.1% and the rental vacancy rate was 7.5%.

0.9% of residents lived in urban areas, while 99.1% lived in rural areas.

=== 2010 census ===
The 2010 census recorded a population of 18,130 in the county, with a population density of 23.3/sq mi (9.0/km^{2}). There were 8,999 housing units, of which 7,599 were occupied.

=== 2000 census ===
As of the census of 2000, there were 18,678 people, about 7,500 households, and 1 family residing in the county. The population density was 24 people per square mile (9.3 people/km^{2}). There were 8,620 housing units at an average density of 11 units per square mile (4.2 units/km^{2}). The racial makeup of the county was 98.93% White, 0.14% Black or African American, 0.22% Native American, 0.11% Asian, 0.01% Pacific Islander, 0.19% from other races, and 0.41% from two or more races. 0.76% of the population were Hispanic or Latino of any race.

There were 7,375 households, out of which 30.90% had children under the age of 18 living with them, 59.70% were married couples living together, 6.10% had a female householder with no husband present, and 30.40% were non-families. 26.30% of all households were made up of individuals, and 13.30% had someone living alone who was 65 years of age or older. The average household size was 2.47 and the average family size was 2.98.

In the county, the population was spread out, with 25.40% under the age of 18, 6.50% from 18 to 24, 26.00% from 25 to 44, 23.60% from 45 to 64, and 18.50% who were 65 years of age or older. The median age was 40 years. For every 100 females, there were 97.60 males. For every 100 females age 18 and over, there were 95.50 males.

The median income for a household in the county was $34,068, and the median income for a family was $40,199. Males had a median income of $27,165 versus $19,644 for females. The per capita income for the county was $16,930. About 5.70% of families and 8.60% of the population were below the poverty line, including 9.60% of those under age 18 and 9.40% of those age 65 or over.

== Communities ==
=== Cities ===
- Clayton
- Edgewood
- Elkader
- Elkport
- Farmersburg
- Garber
- Garnavillo
- Guttenberg
- Luana
- Marquette
- McGregor
- Monona
- North Buena Vista
- Osterdock
- Postville
- St. Olaf
- Strawberry Point
- Volga

=== Unincorporated communities ===
- Beulah
- Ceres
- Clayton Center
- Communia
- Eckards
- Fairview
- Froelich
- Giard
- Gunder
- Hardin
- Highland
- Littleport
- McGregor Heights
- Mederville
- Millville
- Motor
- Osborne
- Saint Sebald
- Thomasville
- Turkey River
- Updegraff
- Watson
- Wood

=== Townships ===
Clayton County is divided into these townships:

- Boardman
- Buena Vista
- Cass
- Clayton
- Cox Creek
- Elk
- Farmersburg
- Garnavillo
- Giard
- Grand Meadow
- Highland
- Jefferson
- Lodomillo
- Mallory
- Marion
- Mendon
- Millville
- Monona
- Read
- Sperry
- Volga
- Wagner

=== Population ranking ===
The population ranking of the following table is based on the 2020 census of Clayton County.

† county seat

Rank	City/Town/etc.	Municipal type	Population (2020 Census)	Population (2024 Estimate)
1	Postville (partially in Allamakee County)	City	2,503	2,418
2	Guttenberg	City	1,817	1,804
3	Monona	City	1,471	1,462
4	† Elkader	City	1,209	1,192
5	Strawberry Point	City	1,155	1,141
6	Edgewood (partially in Delaware County)	City	909	908
7	Garnavillo	City	763	751
8	McGregor	City	742	725
9	Marquette	City	429	434
10	Luana	City	301	303
11	Farmersburg	City	271	264
12	Volga	City	203	200
13	North Buena Vista	City	109	107
14	St. Olaf	City	106	102
15	Garber	City	76	76
16	Clayton	City	45	45
17	Osterdock	City	43	45
18	Elkport	City	29	29

== Politics ==
Clayton County leaned Republican for most of its history, though starting in 1988 it saw a Democratic trend which lasted through 2012. In 2016 the county saw a heavy shift toward the Republican Party, and since then it has voted Republican by increasing margins; both 2020 and 2024 saw the strongest Republican support in the county since the landslide victory of Dwight Eisenhower in 1952.

United States presidential election results for Clayton County, Iowa
Year	Republican		Democratic		Third party(ies)	
Year	No.	%	No.	%	No.	%
1896	3,302	52.16%	2,910	45.96%	119	1.88%
1900	3,366	53.07%	2,884	45.47%	92	1.45%
1904	3,339	54.59%	2,628	42.96%	150	2.45%
1908	2,773	47.04%	3,026	51.33%	96	1.63%
1912	1,239	21.14%	2,919	49.80%	1,703	29.06%
1916	3,347	57.54%	2,379	40.90%	91	1.56%
1920	6,747	77.50%	1,808	20.77%	151	1.73%
1924	4,168	41.48%	1,556	15.48%	4,325	43.04%
1928	6,774	61.28%	4,231	38.28%	49	0.44%
1932	3,725	33.46%	7,347	65.99%	62	0.56%
1936	5,017	41.00%	6,731	55.01%	488	3.99%
1940	7,443	59.86%	4,973	40.00%	18	0.14%
1944	5,855	57.61%	4,259	41.91%	49	0.48%
1948	5,151	50.94%	4,857	48.04%	103	1.02%
1952	7,669	67.22%	3,730	32.70%	9	0.08%
1956	6,529	59.76%	4,384	40.12%	13	0.12%
1960	6,441	58.25%	4,612	41.71%	4	0.04%
1964	3,923	41.08%	5,624	58.89%	3	0.03%
1968	5,132	57.81%	3,168	35.68%	578	6.51%
1972	5,447	60.20%	3,366	37.20%	235	2.60%
1976	4,826	54.80%	3,804	43.19%	177	2.01%
1980	5,115	55.56%	3,297	35.81%	794	8.62%
1984	5,029	58.80%	3,446	40.29%	78	0.91%
1988	3,839	46.58%	4,320	52.41%	83	1.01%
1992	3,044	33.12%	3,742	40.72%	2,404	26.16%
1996	2,944	35.93%	4,284	52.28%	966	11.79%
2000	4,034	47.07%	4,238	49.45%	299	3.49%
2004	4,312	47.03%	4,736	51.66%	120	1.31%
2008	3,651	40.61%	5,195	57.79%	144	1.60%
2012	4,164	45.57%	4,806	52.59%	168	1.84%
2016	5,317	58.24%	3,237	35.46%	575	6.30%
2020	6,106	63.64%	3,340	34.81%	148	1.54%
2024	6,255	66.54%	3,017	32.10%	128	1.36%

== See also ==
- National Register of Historic Places listings in Clayton County, Iowa
- Clayton County Courthouse
