= Madison Township, Buchanan County, Iowa =

Township in Iowa, US

Madison Township, Buchanan County
- Township
- Coordinates: 42°36′03″N 091°39′38″W
- Country: United States
- State: Iowa
- County: Buchanan

Area
  - Total: 36.47 sq mi (94.45 km^{2})
  - Land: 36.44 sq mi (94.39 km^{2})
  - Water: 0.023 sq mi (0.06 km^{2})
- Elevation: 1,089 ft (332 m)

Population (2000)
  - Total: 768
  - Density: 21/sq mi (8.1/km^{2})
- FIPS code: 19-92751
- GNIS feature ID: 0468317

Madison Township is one of sixteen townships in Buchanan County, Iowa, United States. As of the 2000 census, its population was 768.

== Geography ==
Madison Township covers an area of 36.47 square miles (94.5 km^{2}) and contains one incorporated settlement, Lamont. According to the USGS, it contains two cemeteries: Campton and Madison.

== History ==
Madison Township was organized in 1857.
