= Elk Township, Clayton County, Iowa =

Township in Iowa, US

Elk Township
- Township
- Location in Clayton County
- Coordinates: 42°41′12″N 091°18′57″W
- Country: United States
- State: Iowa
- County: Clayton

Area
  - Total: 36.03 sq mi (93.32 km^{2})
  - Land: 36.02 sq mi (93.29 km^{2})
  - Water: 0.015 sq mi (0.04 km^{2}) 0.04%
- Elevation: 1,099 ft (335 m)

Population (2000)
  - Total: 490
  - Density: 14/sq mi (5.3/km^{2})
- GNIS feature ID: 0467776

Elk Township is a township in Clayton County, Iowa, United States. As of the 2000 census, its population was 490.

== History ==
Elk Township is named for the abundance of elk once found there.

== Geography ==
Elk Township covers an area of 36.03 square miles (93.3 km^{2}) and contains no incorporated settlements. According to the USGS, it contains six cemeteries: Asbury, Ebenezer, Elk Creek, Hamlett, Mount Harmony and Wagner.

The streams of Brownfield Creek, Cow Branch, Pine Creek, Rabbit Creek, Steeles Branch and Wolf Creek run through this township.
