= Cass Township, Clayton County, Iowa =

Township in Iowa, US

Cass Township
- Township
- Location in Clayton County
- Coordinates: 42°41′09″N 091°32′47″W
- Country: United States
- State: Iowa
- County: Clayton

Area
  - Total: 36.71 sq mi (95.09 km^{2})
  - Land: 36.71 sq mi (95.09 km^{2})
  - Water: 0 sq mi (0 km^{2}) 0%
- Elevation: 1,211 ft (369 m)

Population (2000)
  - Total: 1,835
  - Density: 50/sq mi (19.3/km^{2})
- GNIS feature ID: 0467540

Cass Township is a township in Clayton County, Iowa, United States. As of the 2000 census, its population was 1,835.

== History ==
Cass Township is named for Lewis Cass.

== Geography ==
Cass Township covers an area of 36.72 square miles (95.1 km^{2}) and contains one incorporated settlement, Strawberry Point. According to the USGS, it contains three cemeteries: County Courners, Saint Mary's, and Strawberry Point Methodist.
