= Area code 563 =

Telephone area code for northeastern Iowa, United States

Numbering plan areas of Iowa with the red area indicating area code 563

Area code 563 is a telephone area code for the east central and northeast corner of the state of Iowa, and includes most of the Iowa side of the Quad Cities. Area code 563 was split from area code 319 in 2001, becoming active on March 25, 2001, and finally becoming mandatory on December 2, 2001.

Prior to the implementation of the code, there was debate over whether the 563 code should have been implemented as a split, or overlaid over the existing 319 code. Mobile phone providers were in favor of the overlay, as a split would have required en masse reprogramming of cell phones. However, at the time, overlays were still a new concept that met with considerable public resistance (due to requirements for 10-digit dialing and mixing of area codes in the same area). It was ultimately decided to use a geographical split instead.

== Service area ==
Bellevue, Bettendorf, Cascade, Clinton, Cresco, Davenport, Decorah, DeWitt, Dubuque, Dyersville, Eldridge, Elgin, Elkader, Epworth, Gunder, Le Claire, Manchester, Maquoketa, Muscatine, Postville, Walcott, Waukon, West Union, Wilton, Worthington, Wadena

== See also ==
- List of Iowa area codes

Iowa area codes: 319, 515, 563, 641, 712
	North: 507/924	
West: 319, 641	563	East: 309/861, 608/353, 815/779
	South: 309/861, 319	
Illinois area codes: 217/447, 309/861, 312, 630/331, 618/730, 708/464, 773, 815/779, 847/224, 872
Minnesota area codes: 218, 320, 507/924, 612, 651, 763, 952
Wisconsin area codes: 262, 414, 608/353, 715/534, 920/274
