= National Register of Historic Places listings in Clayton County, Iowa =

Location of Clayton County in Iowa

This is a list of the National Register of Historic Places listings in Clayton County, Iowa.

This is intended to be a complete list of the properties and districts on the National Register of Historic Places in Clayton County, Iowa, United States. Latitude and longitude coordinates are provided for many National Register properties and districts; these locations may be seen together in a map.

There are 55 properties and districts listed on the National Register in the county. Another two properties were once listed but have been removed.

This National Park Service list is complete through NPS recent listings posted February 13, 2026.

== Current listings ==
	Name on the Register	Image	Date listed	Location	City or town	Description
1	Albertus Building	Albertus Building	April 26, 1979 (#79000891)	222 Park River Dr. 42°47′03″N 91°05′47″W	Guttenberg	
2	American House	American House	August 30, 2001 (#01000913)	116 Main St. 43°01′33″N 91°10′26″W	McGregor	
3	American School of Wild Life Protection Historic District		December 23, 1991 (#91001840)	McGregor Heights Rd., north of McGregor; 43°01′43″N 91°10′33″W	McGregor	
4	Christian Bloedel Wagon Works	Christian Bloedel Wagon Works	September 23, 2009 (#09000765)	524-526 Main St. 43°01′14″N 91°10′49″W	McGregor	
5	Carter House	Carter House	November 7, 1976 (#76000744)	101 High St., SE. 42°51′19″N 91°24′09″W	Elkader	
6	Clayton County Courthouse	Clayton County Courthouse	October 8, 1976 (#76000745)	111 High St. 42°51′19″N 91°24′12″W	Elkader	
7	Clayton School	Clayton School	July 30, 1974 (#74000778)	1st St. 42°54′09″N 91°08′45″W	Clayton	
8	Timothy Davis House	Timothy Davis House	June 22, 1976 (#76000746)	405 1st St., NW. 42°51′23″N 91°24′30″W	Elkader	
9	Dry Run Bridge		June 25, 1998 (#98000803)	Local street over Dry Run; 42°45′10″N 91°22′08″W	Littleport	
10	Eckert House		September 24, 1984 (#84001216)	413 S. 1st St. 42°46′55″N 91°05′45″W	Guttenberg	
11	Effigy Mounds National Monument	Effigy Mounds National Monument	October 15, 1966 (#66000109)	3 miles north of Marquette on Iowa Highway 76; 43°03′52″N 91°10′50″W	Marquette	Extends into Allamakee County
12	Elkader Downtown Historic District	Elkader Downtown Historic District	March 13, 2012 (#12000095)	Portions of the 100 & 200 blocks of Main St. & side streets 42°51′16″N 91°24′16″W	Elkader	Elkader Downtown Multiple Property Submission
13	Elkader Keystone Bridge	Elkader Keystone Bridge	November 7, 1976 (#76000747)	Bridge St. 42°51′17″N 91°24′13″W	Elkader	
14	Elkader Opera House	Elkader Opera House	October 8, 1976 (#76000748)	207 N. Main; 42°51′19″N 91°24′20″W	Elkader	
15	Farmers' State Bank	Farmers' State Bank	September 24, 2018 (#100002983)	502 Washington St. 42°48′11″N 91°32′28″W	Volga	
16	First Congregational Church	First Congregational Church	March 25, 1977 (#77000504)	Washington St. 42°52′06″N 91°14′16″W	Garnavillo	
17	Franklin Hotel	Franklin Hotel	June 25, 1999 (#99000740)	102 Elkader St. 42°41′01″N 91°32′02″W	Strawberry Point	
18	Front Street (River Park Drive) Historic District	Front Street (River Park Drive) Historic District	September 24, 1984 (#84001222)	River Park Dr. between Lessing and Pearl Sts.; also S. 1st, Prince, Goethe, Herder, and Schiller Sts. 42°46′56″N 91°05′42″W	Guttenberg	Second set of addresses represents a boundary increase
19	Fuerste House	Fuerste House	September 24, 1984 (#84001223)	503 S. 1st St. 42°46′54″N 91°05′45″W	Guttenberg	
20	Garnavillo Township Bridge		June 25, 1998 (#98000807)	County road over an unnamed stream 42°51′47″N 91°16′57″W	Garnavillo Township	
21	Garnavillo Township Culvert		June 25, 1998 (#98000805)	County road over an unnamed stream 42°52′04″N 91°16′10″W	Garnavillo Township	One of seven stone limestone arch bridges built in 1900.
22	German Methodist Episcopal Church		February 19, 2026 (#100011791)	25964 Giard Road; 43°00′19″N 91°17′26″W	McGregor	
23	Guttenberg Corn Canning Co.	Guttenberg Corn Canning Co.	September 24, 1984 (#84001226)	413 N. 3rd St. 42°47′18″N 91°06′05″W	Guttenberg	
24	Guttenberg National Fish Hatchery and Aquarium Historic District	Guttenberg National Fish Hatchery and Aquarium Historic District	December 23, 1991 (#91001833)	315 S. River Park Dr. 42°47′01″N 91°05′41″W	Guttenberg	
25	Guttenberg State Bank	Guttenberg State Bank	September 24, 1984 (#84001228)	15 Goethe St. 42°46′59″N 91°05′47″W	Guttenberg	
26	I.O.O.F. Hall	I.O.O.F. Hall	June 18, 1979 (#79000890)	Centre St. 42°52′05″N 91°14′10″W	Garnavillo	
27	Kolker House	Kolker House	September 24, 1984 (#84001230)	110 Goethe St. 42°46′58″N 91°06′35″W	Guttenberg	
28	Lakeside Ballroom	Lakeside Ballroom	February 4, 2002 (#01001539)	1202 N. 4th St. 42°46′22″N 91°06′00″W	Guttenberg	
29	Mallory Township Bridge		June 25, 1998 (#98000809)	County road over an unnamed stream 42°43′08″N 91°10′42″W	Mallory Township	Bridge distinguished as the oldest remaining example of the Pratt half-hip pony truss in Iowa, built in 1890.
30	Matt-Bahls House	Matt-Bahls House	September 24, 1984 (#84001232)	615 S. 3rd St. 42°46′24″N 91°05′53″W	Guttenberg	
31	McClaine House	McClaine House	September 24, 1984 (#84001234)	300 S. 1st St. 42°47′03″N 91°05′50″W	Guttenberg	
32	McGregor Commercial Historic District	McGregor Commercial Historic District	December 10, 2002 (#02001033)	100-300 blocks of Main St. and the 100 and 200 blocks of A St. 43°01′26″N 91°10′33″W	McGregor	
33	Mederville Bridge	Mederville Bridge	June 25, 1998 (#98000808)	County road over the Volga River at Mederville; 42°45′50″N 91°25′17″W	Cox Creek Township	
34	Monona Township Culvert		June 25, 1998 (#98000806)	County road over an unnamed stream 43°02′39″N 91°28′35″W	Monona Township	Replaced in 1998
35	Moser Stone House		September 24, 1984 (#84001236)	211 S. 1st St. 42°47′04″N 91°05′49″W	Guttenberg	
36	Motor Mill Historic District	Motor Mill Historic District	June 9, 2014 (#14000285)	6 miles (9.7 km) below Elkader; 42°48′27″N 91°21′06″W	Elkader	
37	Motor Townsite	Motor Townsite	August 2, 1977 (#77000502)	East of Elkader; 42°48′28″N 91°21′05″W	Elkader	
38	Nieland House	Nieland House	September 24, 1984 (#84001238)	715 S. 1st St. 42°46′43″N 91°05′45″W	Guttenberg	
39	Parker House	Parker House	September 24, 1984 (#84001240)	1015 S. 2nd St. 42°46′34″N 91°05′51″W	Guttenberg	
40	Rialto Price House	Rialto Price House	November 21, 1976 (#76000749)	206 Cedar St., NW. 42°51′16″N 91°24′25″W	Elkader	
41	Read Township Culvert		March 12, 1999 (#99000308)	County road over an unnamed stream 42°50′01″N 91°19′08″W	Read Township	
42	Joseph "Diamond Jo" Reynolds Office Building and House	Joseph "Diamond Jo" Reynolds Office Building and House	February 19, 1982 (#82002614)	A and Main Sts. 43°01′32″N 91°10′34″W	McGregor	
43	Round Barn, Millville Township	Round Barn, Millville Township	June 30, 1986 (#86001423)	U.S. Route 52; 42°42′56″N 91°05′04″W	Millville Township	
44	St. Joseph Church and Parish Hall	St. Joseph Church and Parish Hall	November 21, 1976 (#76000750)	330 1st St., NW. 42°51′05″N 91°24′13″W	Elkader	
45	St. Mary's Catholic Church Historic District	St. Mary's Catholic Church Historic District	August 12, 2004 (#04000817)	502, 518, and 520 S. 2nd St. and 214 Herder St. 42°46′52″N 91°05′38″W	Guttenberg	
46	St. Olaf Auditorium	St. Olaf Auditorium	December 9, 1994 (#94001446)	118 S. Main St. 42°55′40″N 91°23′10″W	St. Olaf	
47	St. Peters United Evangelical Lutheran Church	St. Peters United Evangelical Lutheran Church	December 12, 1976 (#76000743)	U.S. Route 52; 42°49′21″N 91°11′15″W	Ceres	
48	Schmidt House	Schmidt House	March 25, 1977 (#77000503)	101 Oak St., NW. 42°51′11″N 91°24′26″W	Elkader	
49	Peter Stauer House	Peter Stauer House	September 13, 2003 (#03000914)	629 Main St. 43°01′07″N 91°10′55″W	McGregor	
50	J.C. Stemmer House	J.C. Stemmer House	October 21, 1976 (#76000751)	113 Oak, NW. 42°51′13″N 91°24′29″W	Elkader	
51	Stone Barn		September 24, 1984 (#84001244)	12 Goethe St. 42°46′58″N 91°06′30″W	Guttenberg	
52	Turkey River State Preserve Archeological District		May 30, 1990 (#90000774)	Estes Point Road; 42°43′11″N 91°02′54″W	Millville	
53	Valley Mills	Valley Mills	December 12, 1976 (#76000752)	East of Garnavillo; 42°51′50″N 91°11′34″W	Garnavillo	
54	Weber House	Weber House	September 24, 1984 (#84001247)	822 S. River Park Dr. 42°46′37″N 91°05′43″W	Guttenberg	
55	Wehmer House	Wehmer House	September 24, 1984 (#84001249)	910 S. River Park Dr. 42°46′34″N 91°05′43″W	Guttenberg	

== Former listings ==
	Name on the Register	Image	Date listed	Date removed	Location	City or town	Description
1	County Road Bridge 15		June 25, 1998 (#98000804)	December 15, 2003	County road over an unnamed stream	Elkader	
2	Goedert Meat Market	Goedert Meat Market	October 18, 1996 (#96001159)	September 8, 2022	322 Main St. 43°01′22″N 91°10′40″W	McGregor	Italianate influenced commercial building with the only complete cast-iron storefront in McGregor. Destroyed by a tornado on July 19, 2017.
3	Hartwick House		December 1, 1978 (#78001211)	September 23, 1987	West of McGregor on U.S. Route 18	McGregor	Demolished in 1984

== See also ==
- List of National Historic Landmarks in Iowa
- National Register of Historic Places listings in Iowa
- Listings in neighboring counties: Allamakee, Buchanan, Crawford (WI), Delaware, Dubuque, Fayette, Grant (WI), Winneshiek
