= Eckert House =

Eckert House may refer to:

in the United States (by state)

- Eckert House (Guttenberg, Iowa), listed on the National Register of Historic Places in Clayton County, Iowa
- Ignatius Eckert House, Hastings, Minnesota, listed on the NRHP in Dakota County, Minnesota
- Eckert House (San Angelo, Texas), listed on the National Register of Historic Places in Tom Green County, Texas
