= Valley Mills =

Valley Mills may refer to:

- Derwent Valley Mills, a World Heritage Site along the River Derwent in Derbyshire, England
- Valley Mills (Garnavillo, Iowa), a building listed on the U.S. National Register of Historic Places
- Valley Mills, Texas, U.S., a city
- Valley Mills, West Virginia, U.S., an unincorporated community
