= Lakeside Ballroom =

- U.S. National Register of Historic Places
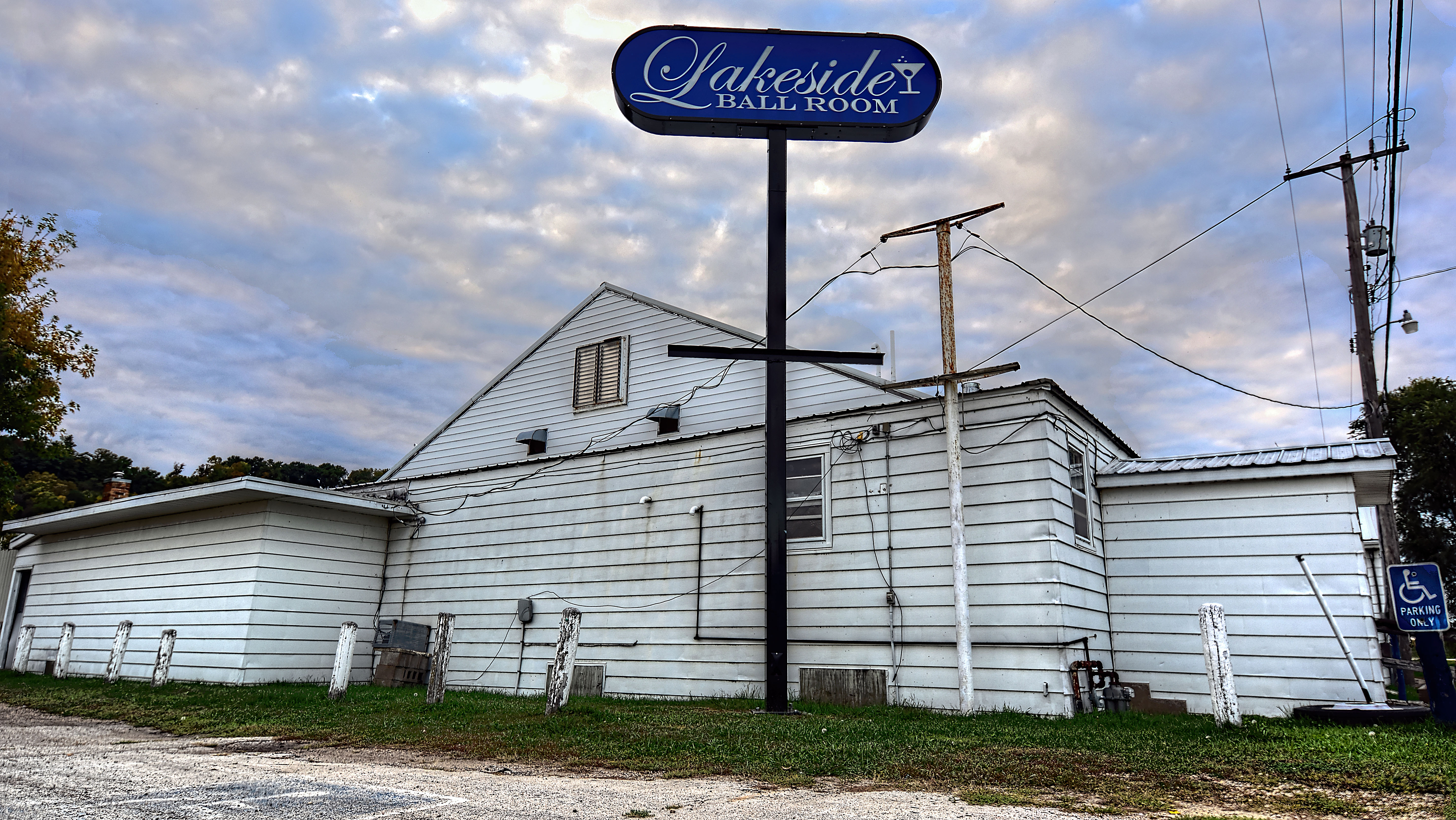

- Location within Iowa Location within the United States
- Location: 1202 N. 4th St. Guttenberg, Iowa
- Coordinates: 42°47′57.8″N 91°06′15.4″W
- Area: less than one acre
- Built: 1927, 1935
- Built by: Louis Schroeder
- NRHP reference No.: 01001539
- Added to NRHP: February 4, 2002

The Lakeside Ballroom, also known as the Lakeside Pavilion, is a historic building located in Guttenberg, Iowa, United States. It is located next to the Mississippi River near a backwater known as Bussey Lake. The first part of the building was completed in 1927 by local contractor Louis Schroeder for $17,000. William (Bill) Kann Sr. had the facility built as the Lakeside Pavilion, and it was operated by two of his sons, Edmund and William Jr. They sold the building in 1935 and it was expanded and converted into a ballroom. Many local and national music acts performed at Lakeside, including: Jesse Stone, Jimmy Wade, Wayne King and their orchestras.

The building is a 173 by 114 feet (53 by 35 m) rectangle, except for entrances on the east and north sides and a small room to the southwest corner that was reportedly used to store alcohol during Prohibition. It was listed on the National Register of Historic Places in 2002.
