= Bluff Street Historic District =

Bluff Street Historic District may refer to:

- Bluff Street Historic District (Guttenberg, Iowa), listed on the National Register of Historic Places in Clayton County, Iowa
- Bluff Street Historic District (Beloit, Wisconsin), listed on the National Register of Historic Places in Rock County, Wisconsin
