= Buck Creek (Mississippi River tributary) =

Coordinates: 42.836933°N 91.107073°W

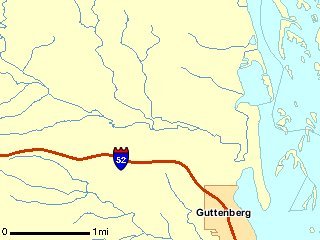
Buck Creek (north of US Highway 52)

Buck Creek is a small tributary of the Upper Mississippi River flowing mainly through Garnavillo and Jefferson Townnships in Clayton County, Iowa, to join the Big River at Bussey Lake, a backwater lake approximately two miles above Lock and Dam No. 10 at Guttenberg, Iowa. The Army Corps of Engineers is working to reduce erosion problems in the creek's drainage.

Clayton County maintains a 100-acre (0.40 km^{2}) park on the creek.

Buck was so named in 1837 when a pioneer shot a deer there.

== See also ==
- List of rivers of Iowa

== Sources ==
- Army Corps of Engineers
- Clayton County parks
