= Wehmer =

Wehmer is a surname. Notable people with the name include:

- Carl Wehmer (1858–1935), German chemist and mycologist
- Friedrich Wehmer (1885–1964), German politician
- Justus Wehmer (ca.1690–1750), German architect

See also

- Wehmer House, is a historic building located in Guttenberg, Iowa, United States
