= Kolker House =

Historic house in Iowa, United States

- U.S. National Register of Historic Places
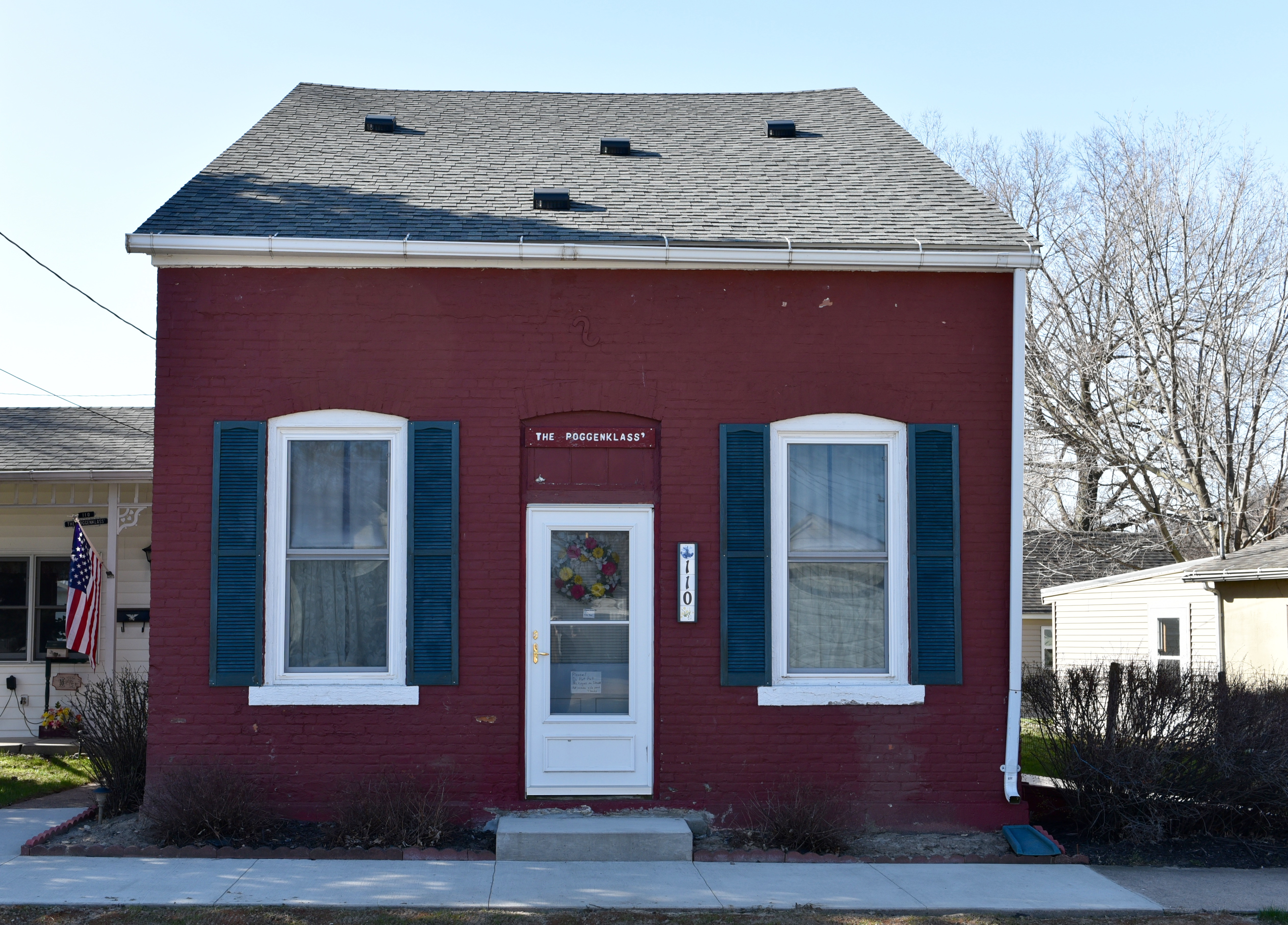

- Location within Iowa Location within the United States
- Location: 110 Goethe St. Guttenberg, Iowa
- Coordinates: 42°46′58″N 91°05′51.3″W
- Area: less than one acre
- Built: 1859
- MPS: Guttenberg MRA
- NRHP reference No.: 84001230
- Added to NRHP: September 24, 1984

The Kolker House is a historic building located in Guttenberg, Iowa, United States. The two-story brick structure was built about 1859 in what is known as the "Wide Gable Style," with the roof's ridge parallel to the street. Its significance is derived from its early construction, its brick rather than stone construction, a "Flying Buttress" eavespout at the houses right corner, and its excellent condition. The kitchen wing is on the east, and the garage dates from the late 20th-century. The building was listed on the National Register of Historic Places in 1984.
