= McClaine House =

Historic house in Iowa, United States

- U.S. National Register of Historic Places
- The building in 2021

- Location within Iowa Location within the United States
- Location: 300 South First Street; Guttenberg, Iowa
- Coordinates: 42°47′0.2″N 91°05′50.4″W
- Area: less than one acre
- MPS: Guttenberg MRA
- NRHP reference No.: 84001234
- Added to NRHP: September 24, 1984

The McClaine House is a historic building located in Guttenberg, Iowa, United States. This two-story brick structure has historically been a combination residence and commercial building. Sanborn maps list the commercial space as housing: a barber shop (1886), cigar factory (1902), and swelling (1928). The second floor is four bays wide, while the main floor is three bays. The middle two windows on the top floor each have a small window located above. Across the top of the structure there is a plain cornice that is enhanced by modillion blocks. The building was listed on the National Register of Historic Places in 1984.
