= St. Peters United Evangelical Lutheran Church =

- U.S. National Register of Historic Places
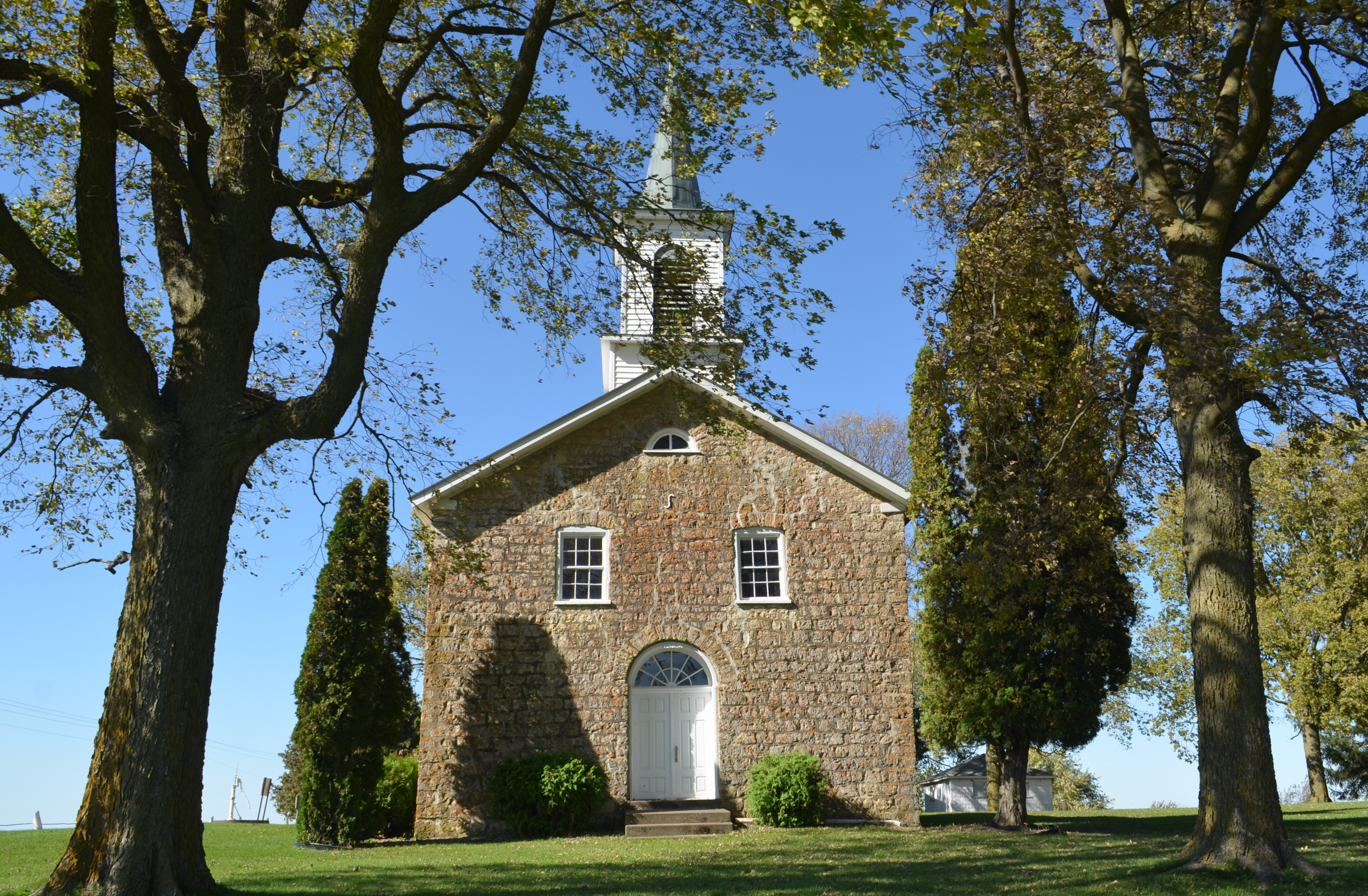
- The church in Ceres

- Location within Iowa Location within the United States
- Location: U.S. Route 52; Ceres, Iowa
- Coordinates: 42°49′21″N 91°11′15″W
- Built: 1858
- NRHP reference No.: 76000743
- Added to NRHP: December 12, 1976

St. Peters United Evangelical Lutheran Church is a former Lutheran Church located in the rural unincorporated community of Ceres, which is located in Clayton County, Iowa, United States. The church building was listed on the National Register of Historic Places in 1976. The property is also known as the Pioneer Rock Church.

== History ==
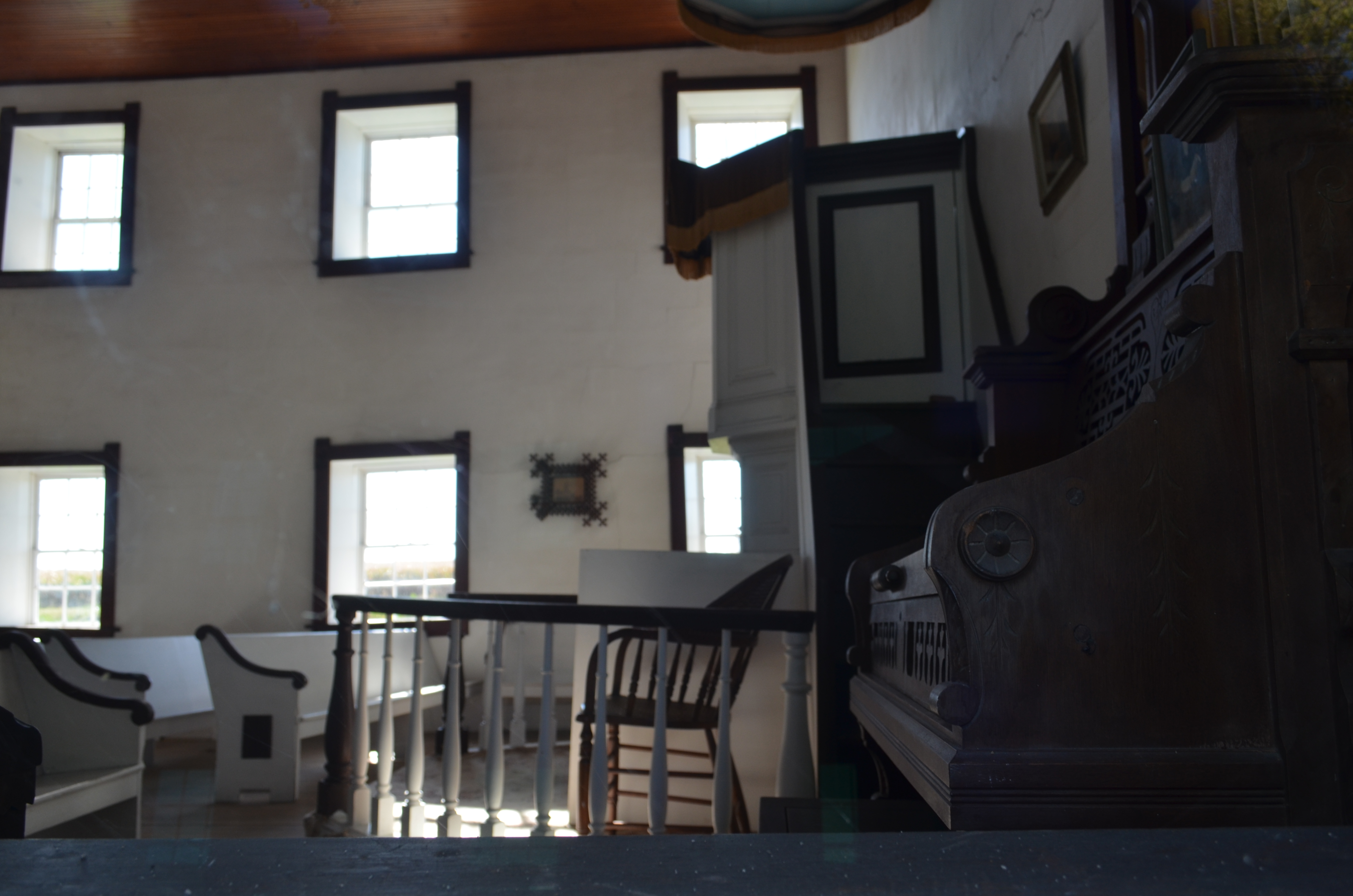
Church interior

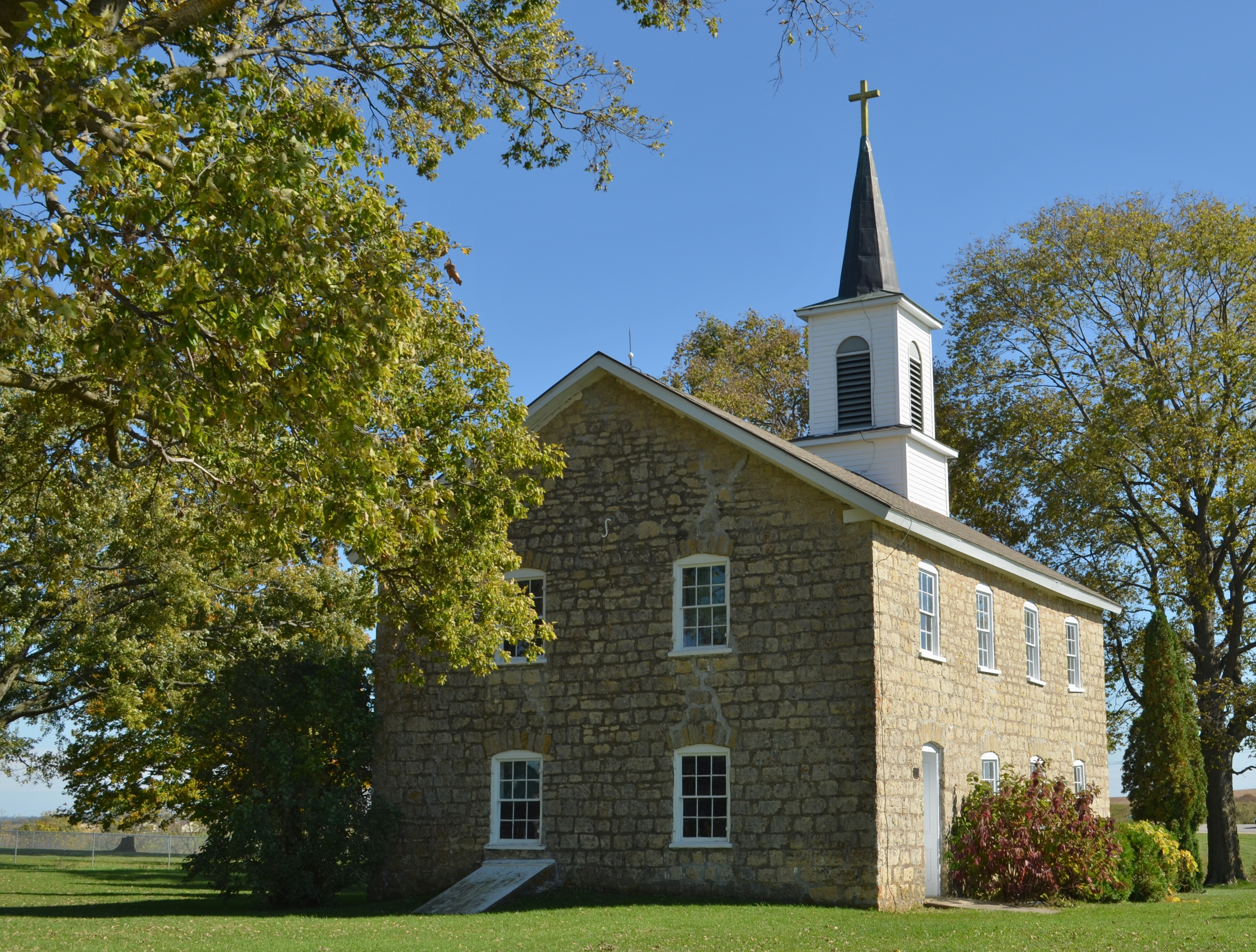
Rear of the church.

The village of Ceres was initially called Independence. The Lutherans in the area traveled to Garnavillo, Iowa for services where the Rev. Paul Stockfeld was the pastor. Stockfeld, who was also a teacher and doctor, was called to help organize the church at Independence. The members who organized the new church with Rev. Stockfeld included G.H. Bierbaum; Chris Bierbaum; Casper, Henry and Carl Backhaus; H. Wiegman, J.H. Abker and Gerhard Walke. They initially met in February 1858 and elected J.H. Abker the president and Stockfeld as the secretary.

Land for the church building was purchased for $30 an acre from Eli Carlan. Gerhard Bierbaum deeded another acre for a total of 6.16-acre (2.49 ha). The church members quarried the stone from the Bierbaum quarry. The cornerstone for the church was laid on October 25, 1858. The building measures 55 by 30 feet (16.8 by 9.1 m), with the 12-foot (3.7 m) length in the back reserved for the pastor's quarters. The structure was built for less than $1,100. A well of 35 feet (11 m) deep and 5 feet (1.5 m) in diameter was dug by Sebastian Walsh for a $1.00 a foot until he hit rick and then he was paid $1.15 a foot.

The altar was designed by Mr. Prior of Guttenberg, Iowa for $68. Casper, Henry and Carl Backhaus built the pews and were paid $2.50 for each pew. The altar and pews were painted white with the trim in walnut.

During the pastorate of Rev. Ziemer the bell tower was added to the church building in 1898 for $300. A bell was installed the same year for $111. A church organ was bought for $102 in 1874, and another was bought in 1890. Mrs. G. Blech served the church as its organist.

The Rev. Gamelin became pastor at both the Pioneer Rock Church and in Garnavillo in 1894. Services at that time were held every two weeks in the church. The last resident pastor, the Rev. John Bunge, served from 1901-1907. The last two pastors, the Rev. Mall, and the Rev. Bosholm, resided in Garnavillo. In 1927 an association was formed to take care of the church and cemetery as a memorial to those who built it.
