= Parker House (Guttenberg, Iowa) =

Historic house in Iowa, United States

- U.S. National Register of Historic Places
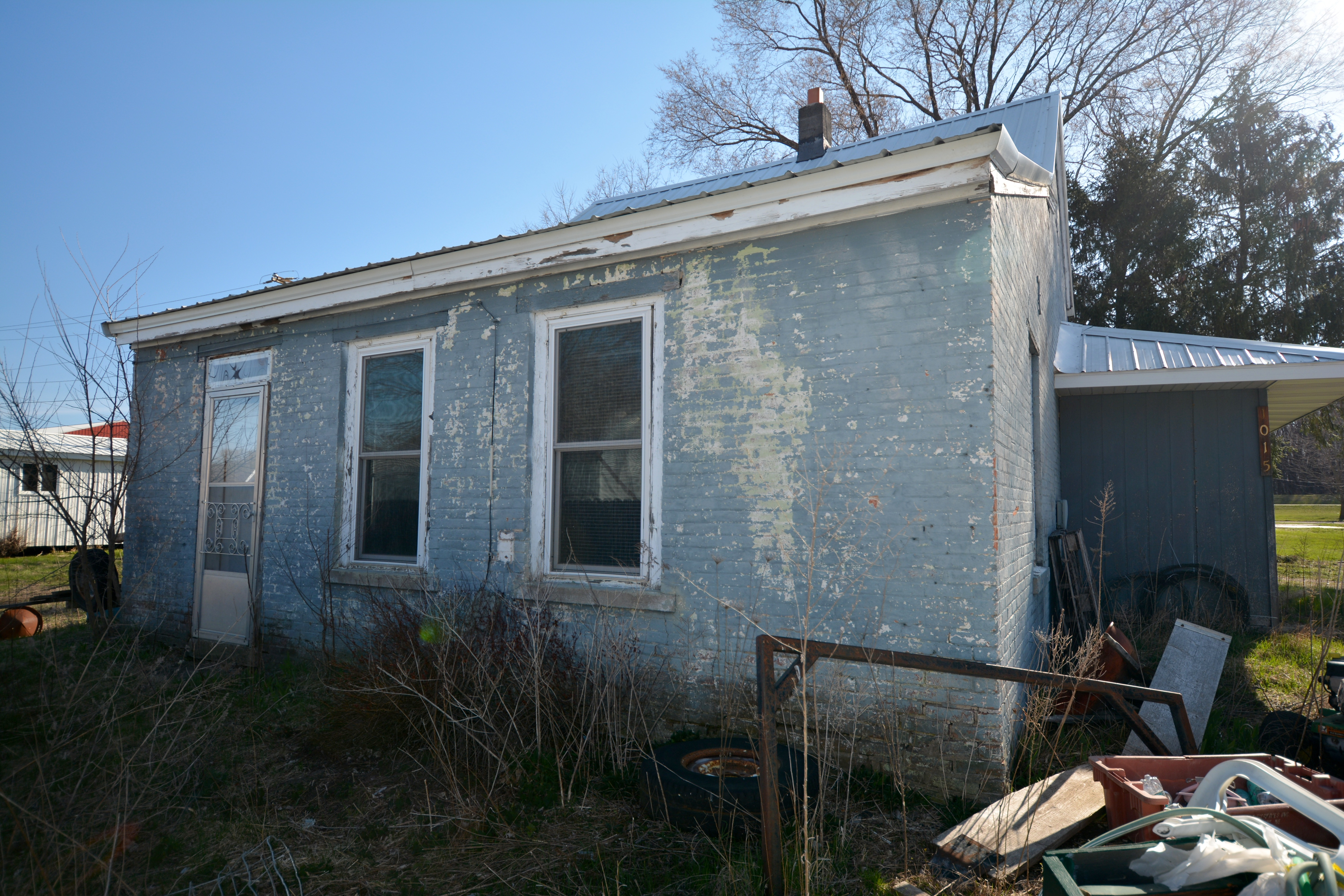

- Location within Iowa Location within the United States
- Location: 1015 S. 2nd St. Guttenberg, Iowa
- Coordinates: 42°46′29.3″N 91°05′49.2″W
- Area: less than one acre
- Built: 1858
- MPS: Guttenberg MRA
- NRHP reference No.: 84001240
- Added to NRHP: September 24, 1984

The Parker House is a historic building located in Guttenberg, Iowa, United States. This two-story brick structure with a brick lean-to addition, which houses the kitchen, was built in 1858. It is one of the oldest residences in town. The house sits on the back of the lot facing the alley. The building was listed on the National Register of Historic Places in 1984.
