= Nieland House =

Historic house in Iowa, United States

- U.S. National Register of Historic Places
- The house in 2021

- Location within Iowa Location within the United States
- Location: 715 South First Street; Guttenberg, Iowa
- Coordinates: 42°46′42.9″N 91°05′46.2″W
- Area: less than one acre
- MPS: Guttenberg MRA
- NRHP reference No.: 84001238
- Added to NRHP: September 24, 1984

The Nieland House is a historic building located in Guttenberg, Iowa, United States. This two-story brick structure's construction dates from before 1886. It is local version of the New England Saltbox. The second floor has only three windows on the northern two-thirds of the facade. The main floor is a symmetrical five bays wide. The building was listed on the National Register of Historic Places in 1984.
