= Motor Mill Historic District =

NRHP district near Elkader, Iowa, United States

- U.S. National Register of Historic Places
- U.S. Historic district
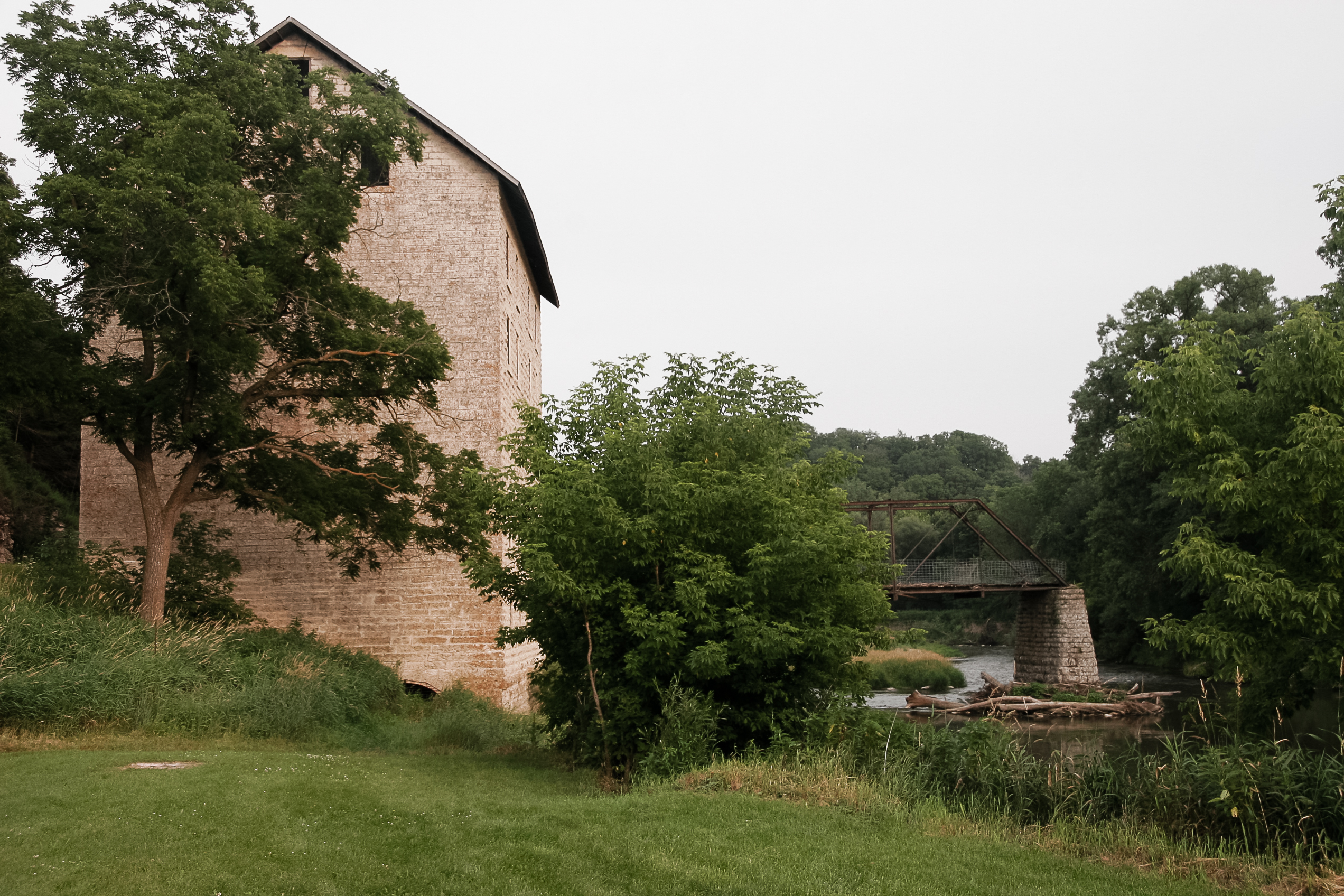

- Location within Iowa Location within the United States
- Nearest city: Elkader, Iowa
- Coordinates: 42°48′25.3″N 91°21′05″W
- Built: 1869
- MPS: Flour Milling in Iowa MPS
- NRHP reference No.: 14000285
- Added to NRHP: June 9, 2014

The Motor Mill Historic District is a nationally recognized historic district located southeast of Elkader, Iowa, United States in the small unincorporated town of Motor. It was listed on the National Register of Historic Places in 2014. In 1977 it had been listed as a contributing property in the Motor Townsite.

== History ==
John Thompson, James Crosby, and J.P. Dickinson formed a partnership to establish a town, a mill, and other business ventures along the Turkey River at a place known as Hastings Bottom. The new town was named Motor. They spent $50,000 constructing the mill and $40,000 on equipment and other buildings. Stone for these structures was quarried from the bluff above and it was lowered in cable cars that ran on wooden rails.

Skilled German stonemasons from nearby Communia were hired to construct the 90-foot (27 m) tall, six-story gristmill. Legend has it that there were four of them and each worked on a different wall. Each tried to outdo the others in order to display his own craftsmanship, which is why three walls are composed of rounded stone while the fourth wall was laid with square cut stone. The stone faces on the north side are flat because the investors intended to build a woolen mill there, but they could not find investors to build it.

The mill was completed in 1869, and it was operational by the following year. The mill ground barley, oats and rye for livestock feed; wheat and buckwheat into flour; and corn into cornmeal. Barrels were made in the nearby cooperage to ship the flour and corn meal. But the mill couldn't overcome difficulties beyond its control. Chinch bugs destroyed area wheat crops and all the mills in the area competed for fewer raw materials. A narrow-gauge railroad planned to serve the community was washed out, and a flood in 1883 washed out the dam. The mill's investors never recouped what they put into it, and the partnership dissolved. The district court auctioned the property in 1891. Louis Klink bought the townsite in 1903. He sold the mill's machinery and he used the buildings for his farm operation. The property remained in the family for 80 years. The Clayton County Conservation Board acquired the property in 1983 and converted into a park.
