= Stone Barn (Guttenberg, Iowa) =

- U.S. National Register of Historic Places
- Location within Iowa Location within the United States
- Location: 12 Goethe St. Guttenberg, Iowa
- Coordinates: 42°46′57.2″N 91°05′46.7″W
- MPS: Guttenberg MRA
- NRHP reference No.: 84001244
- Added to NRHP: September 24, 1984

The Stone Barn is a historic building located in Guttenberg, Iowa, United States. This 1½-story stone structure is located along an alley and has been used for storage. There are indications that at one time it served the dual purpose of shop and residence. The garage door opening is not original to the structure and is located where a smaller door was initially located. There was a fireplace on west side of interior, and the possibility of an arched cellar window at the northwest corner. The building was listed on the National Register of Historic Places in 1984.
