= Bussey Lake =

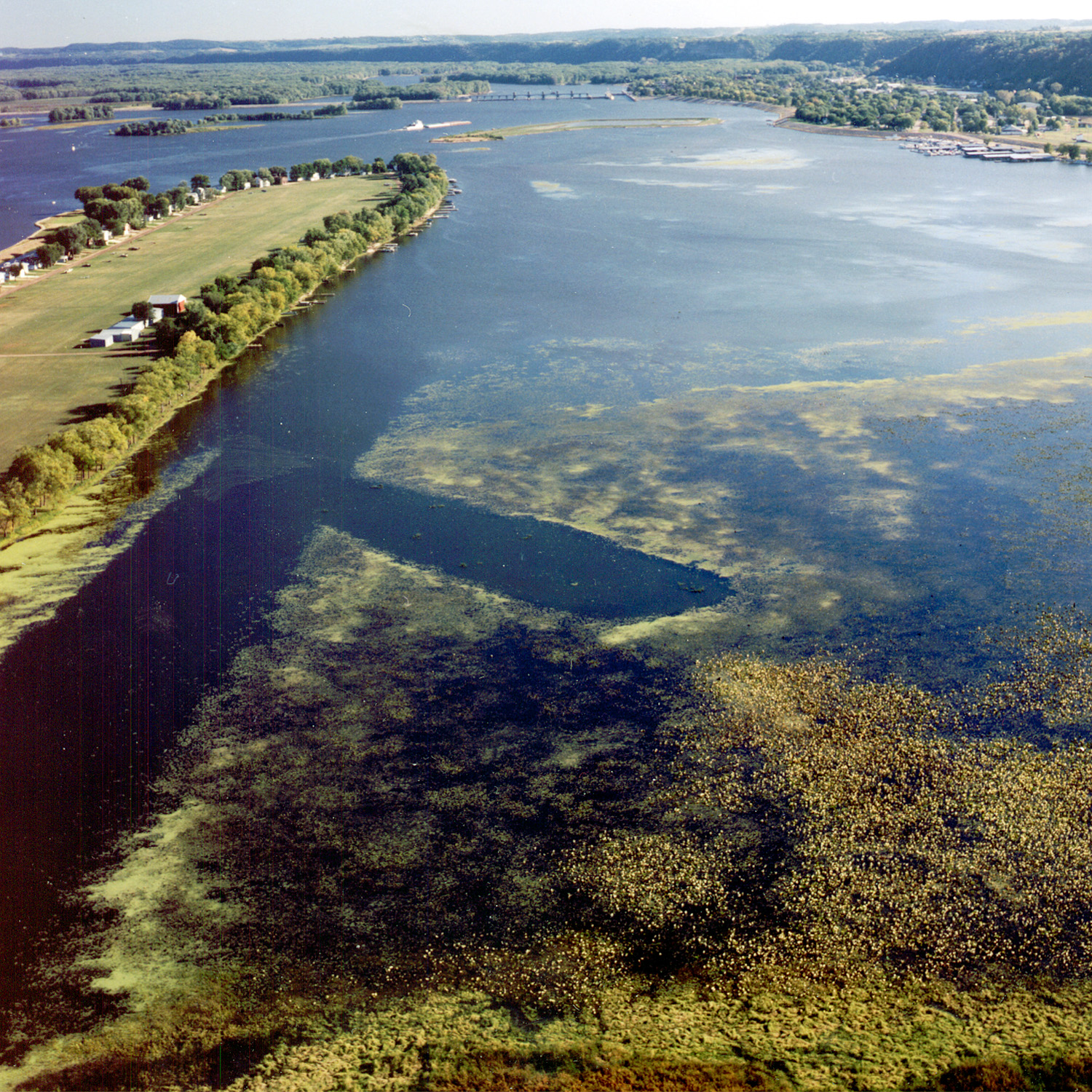
- Aerial view of Bussey Lake on the Mississippi River

- Location within Iowa Location within the United States
- Location: Guttenberg, Iowa
- Coordinates: 42°48′31″N 91°06′10″W
- Primary outflows: Upper Mississippi River
- Basin countries: United States
- Surface area: 213 acres (86 ha)
- Surface elevation: 614 ft (187 m)

Bussey Lake is a backwater lake on the Iowa side of the Upper Mississippi River located about 2 miles (3.2 km) above Lock and Dam No. 10, at Guttenberg, Iowa. The lake is joined by many rivers and creeks such as Buck Creek.

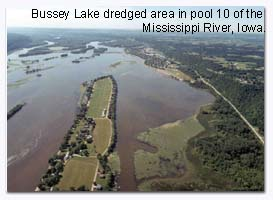

Measuring 213 acres (0.86 km^{2}), it is part of the Upper Mississippi River National Wildlife and Fish Refuge.

== Sources ==
- Army Corps of Engineers, Bussey Lake Habitat Project, Guttenberg, Iowa
