= Guttenberg Corn Canning Co. =

- U.S. National Register of Historic Places
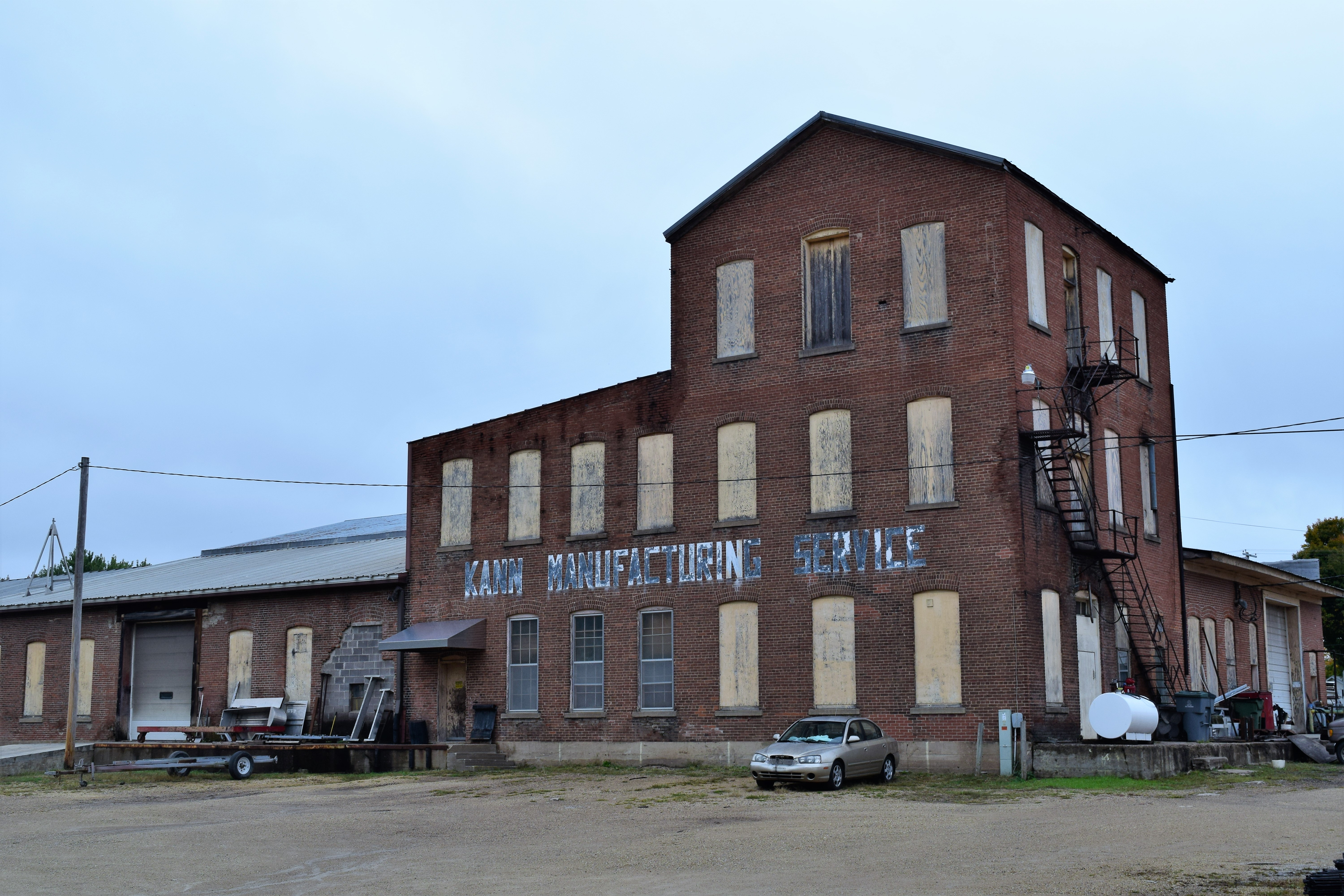

- Location within Iowa Location within the United States
- Location: 413 N. 3rd St. Guttenberg, Iowa
- Coordinates: 42°47′23″N 91°06′11″W
- Area: less than one acre
- Built: 1912
- Built by: Nelson Beeler
- MPS: Guttenberg MRA
- NRHP reference No.: 84001226
- Added to NRHP: September 24, 1984

The Guttenberg Corn Canning Co. is a historic building located in Guttenberg, Iowa, United States. The facility was built by Waukon, Iowa contractor Nelson Beeler, and completed in 1912 for the Guttenberg Corn Canning Company. It is considered a good example of a three-story brick commercial structure. After World War II the building was occupied by Iowa Food Products, and now by Kann Manufacturing Company. The building was listed on the National Register of Historic Places in 1984.
