= Moser Stone House =

Historic house in Iowa, United States

- U.S. National Register of Historic Places
- Location within Iowa Location within the United States
- Location: 211 S. 1st St. Guttenberg, Iowa
- Coordinates: 42°47′03.5″N 91°05′49.7″W
- Area: less than one acre
- MPS: Guttenberg MRA
- NRHP reference No.: 84001236
- Added to NRHP: September 24, 1984

The Moser Stone House is a historic building located in Guttenberg, Iowa, United States. This two-story limestone structure is a side gable house whose construction dates from before 1858. It is located along an alley at the rear of the property, and features an enclosed porch that is typical of many early residences in town. The building was listed on the National Register of Historic Places in 1984.
