= Matt-Bahls House =

Historic house in Iowa, United States

- U.S. National Register of Historic Places
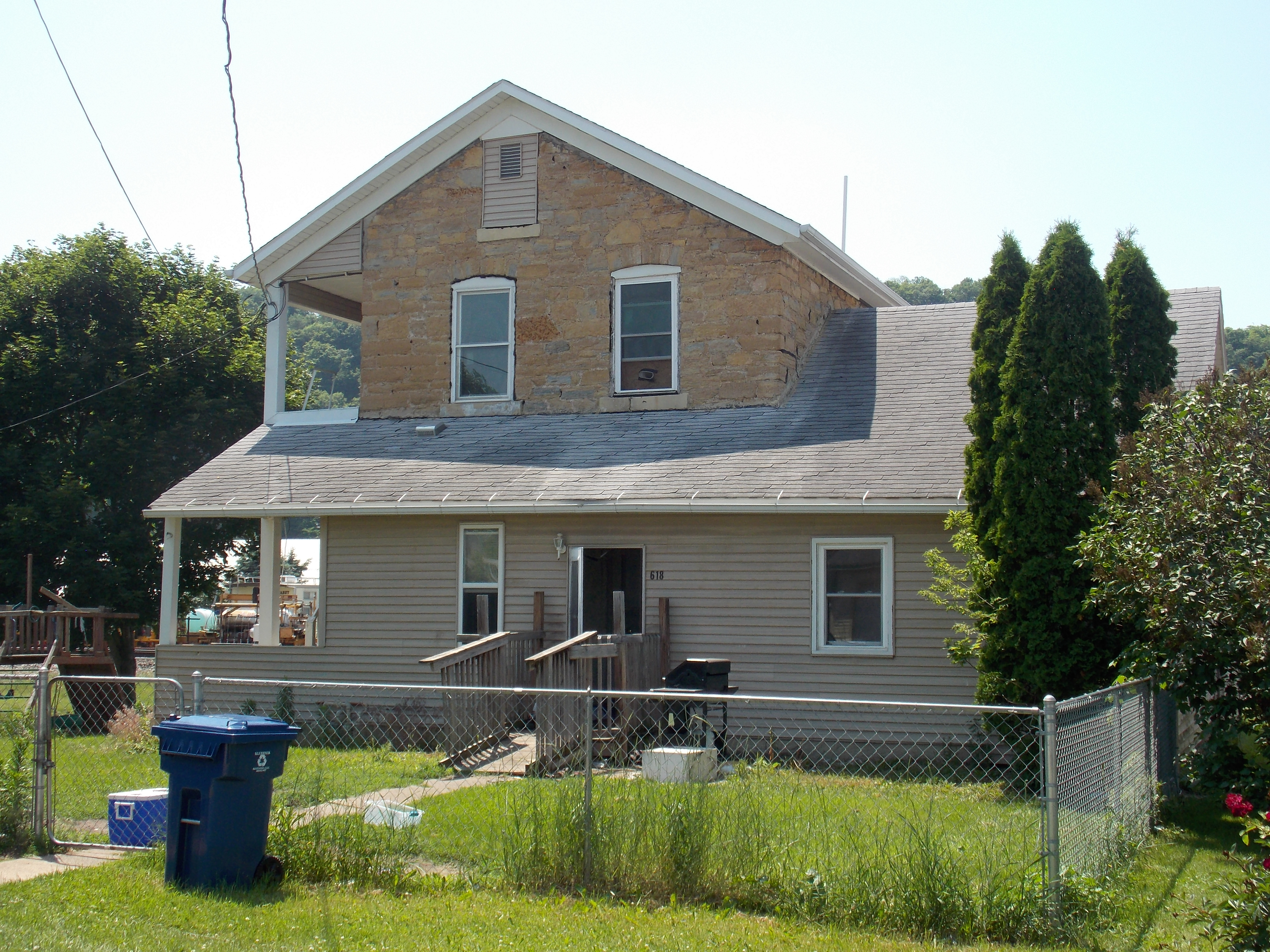

- Location within Iowa Location within the United States
- Location: 615 S. 3rd St. Guttenberg, Iowa
- Coordinates: 42°46′46.7″N 91°05′53.5″W
- Area: less than one acre
- MPS: Guttenberg MRA
- NRHP reference No.: 84001232
- Added to NRHP: September 24, 1984

The Matt-Bahls House is a historic building located in Guttenberg, Iowa, United States. The two-story vernacular stone structure was built sometime before 1858. It features a full-length, two-story, frame porch on its south side. The single-story frame addition on the northeast side blends into the older structure. The building was listed on the National Register of Historic Places in 1984.
