= Garnavillo Township Culvert =

- U.S. National Register of Historic Places
- Location within Iowa Location within the United States
- Location: County road over an unnamed stream
- Nearest city: Garnavillo, Iowa
- Coordinates: 42°52′04″N 91°16′10″W
- Built: 1899
- Built by: Josef Vogt
- Architectural style: Stone arch culvert
- MPS: Highway Bridges of Iowa MPS
- NRHP reference No.: 98000805
- Added to NRHP: June 25, 1998

The Garnavillo Township Culvert is a historic structure located west of Garnavillo, Iowa, United States. It spans an unnamed stream for 14 feet (4.3 m). On April 4, 1899, C.G. Stickfort and others petitioned the county for a bridge at this location. The Clayton County Board of Supervisors contracted with Josef Vogt of Guttenberg, Iowa to build this single stone arch culvert of native limestone. It is no longer in use, but remains in place west of Iris Avenue. The culvert was listed on the National Register of Historic Places in 1998.
