= Weber House (Guttenberg, Iowa) =

Historic house in Iowa, United States

- U.S. National Register of Historic Places
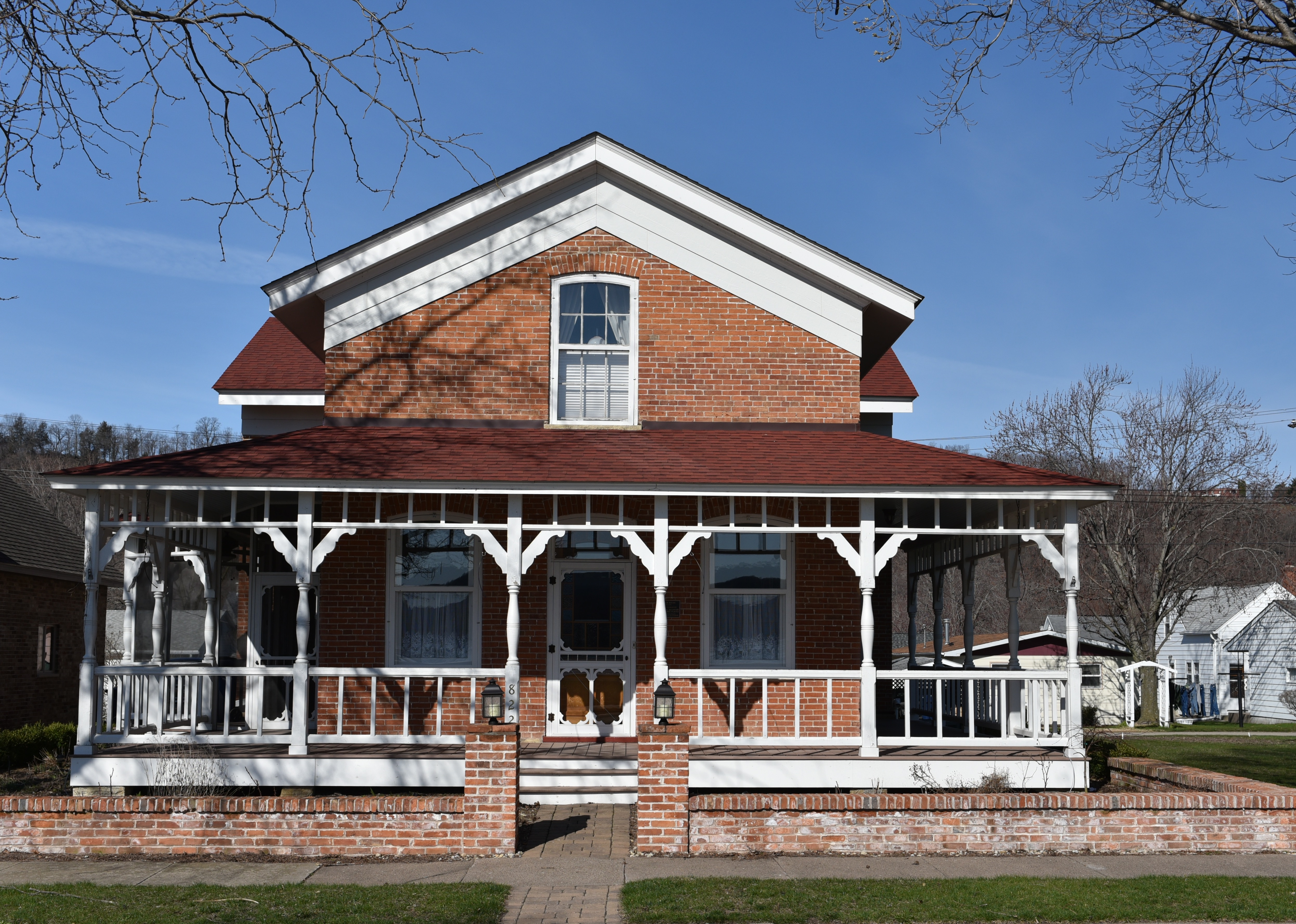

- Location within Iowa Location within the United States
- Location: 822 S. River Park Dr. Guttenberg, Iowa
- Coordinates: 42°46′37.3″N 91°05′44″W
- Area: less than one acre
- MPS: Guttenberg MRA
- NRHP reference No.: 84001247
- Added to NRHP: September 24, 1984

The Weber House is a historic building located in Guttenberg, Iowa, United States. It was built by Dr. Weber, a German immigrant surgeon, sometime before 1858. It is also possible his name was George Wehmer. Subsequently, the house was associated with the Freidlein and Zimmerman families who owned a nearby saw mill and lumber yard. Initially, the 1½-story brick structure was in a "T" shape with a full size porch across the front. The house has been added onto the rear. A two-frame kitchen wing had been added to the north side around 1900, and is no longer extant. There was also a summer kitchen on the property at one time. The building was listed on the National Register of Historic Places in 1984.
