= J.C. Stemmer House =

Historic house in Iowa, United States

- U.S. National Register of Historic Places
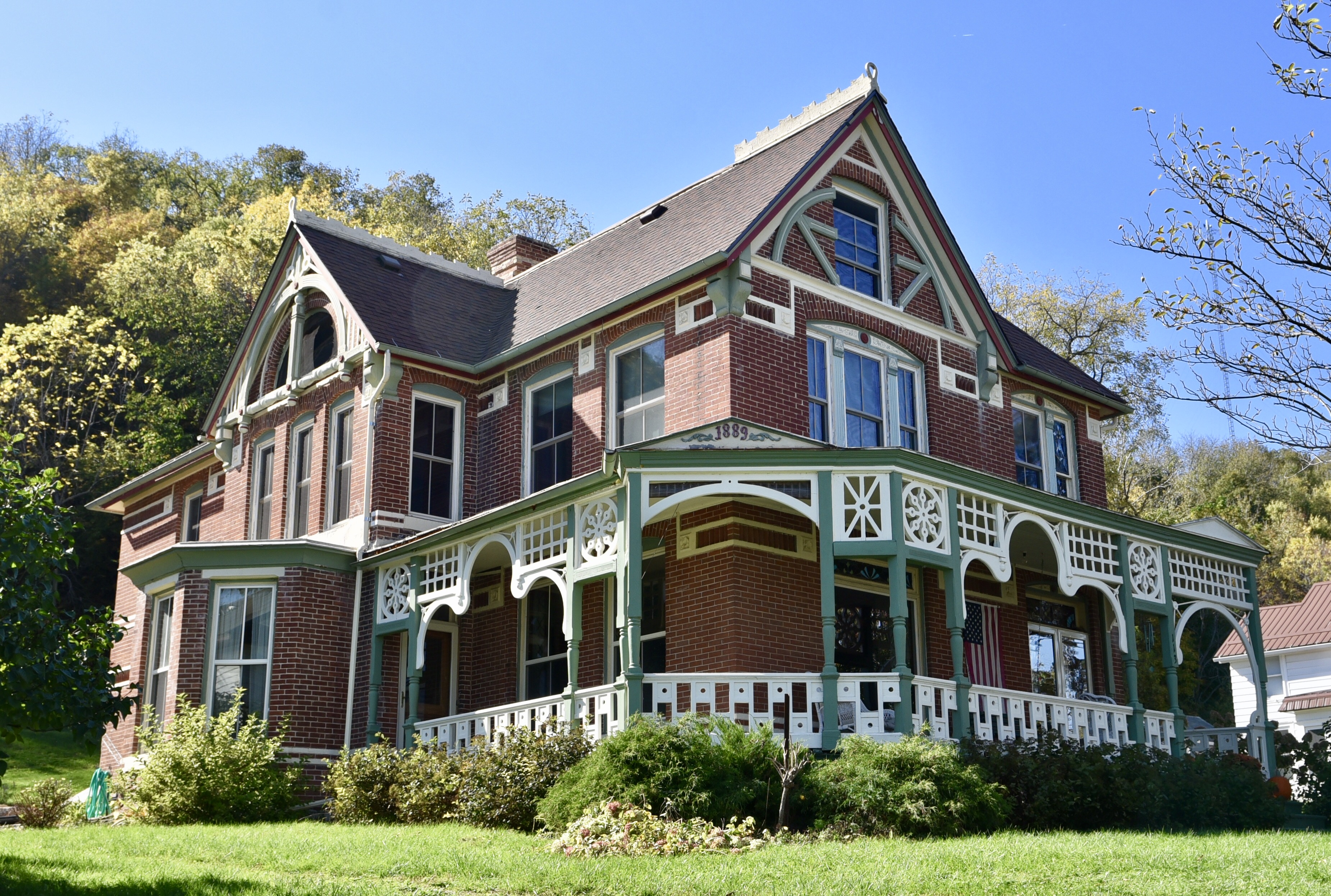

- Location within Iowa Location within the United States
- Location: 113 Oak, NW. Elkader, Iowa
- Coordinates: 42°51′13″N 91°24′29″W
- Area: less than one acre
- Built: 1899
- Built by: Henry Behnke
- NRHP reference No.: 76000751
- Added to NRHP: October 21, 1976

The J.C. Stemmer House is a historic building located in Elkader, Iowa, United States. This two-story brick structure was built in 1889 in the Victorian style. Its elaborate and extensive woodwork is its primary feature. While it is primarily capped with a hip roof the wings feature gable ends that allow for bargeboards and stone decoration. A single-story wrap-around wooden porch with latticework covers the main facade and follows to the south. The house also features stained glass windows above the main entrance and at various other locations. It was listed on the National Register of Historic Places in 1976.
