= Albertus Building =

- U.S. National Register of Historic Places
- U.S. Historic district – Contributing property
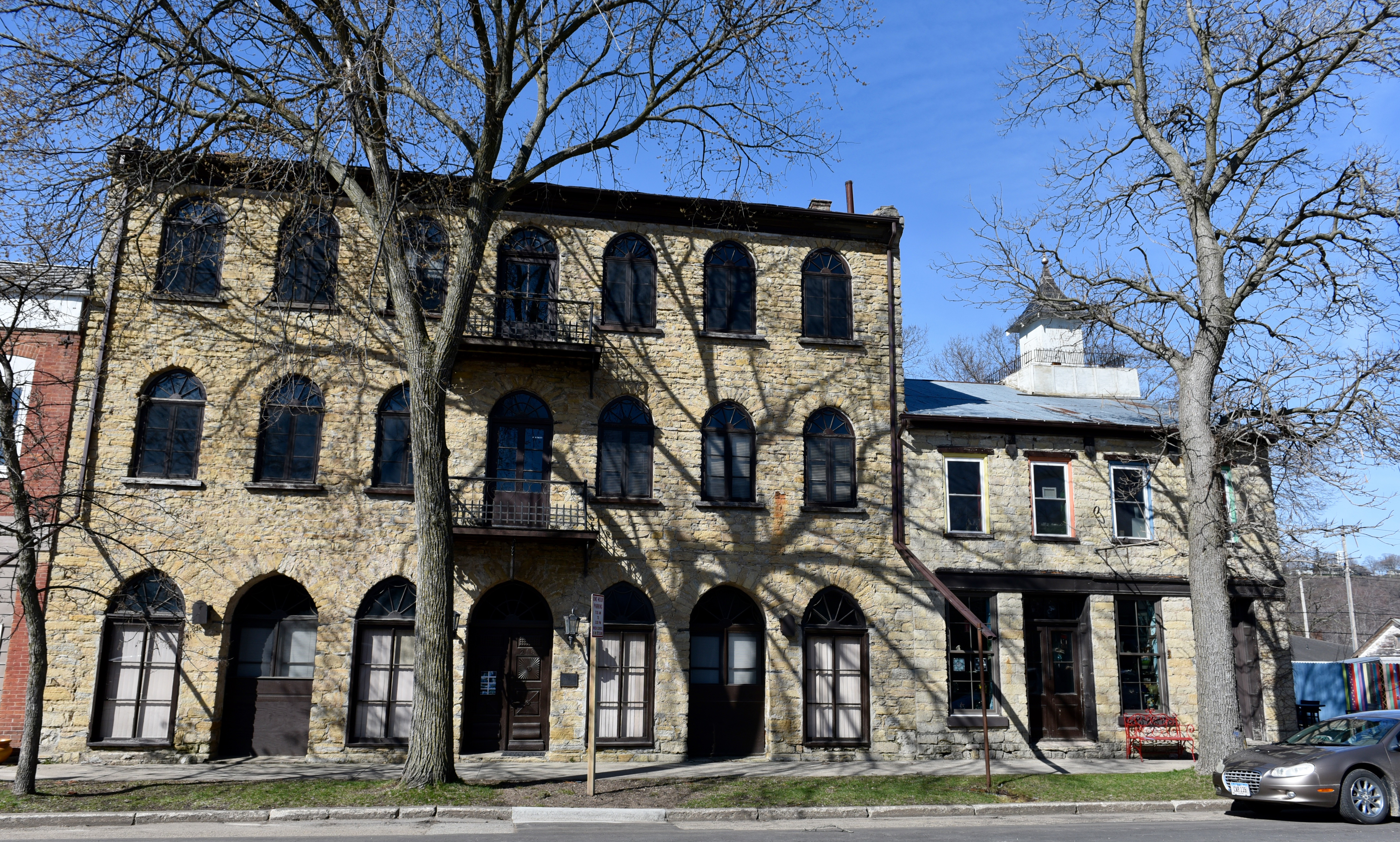

- Location within Iowa Location within the United States
- Location: 222 Park River Dr. Guttenberg, Iowa
- Coordinates: 42°47′03.6″N 91°05′48.2″W
- Area: less than one acre
- Built: 1855
- Built by: C. Albertus
- Part of: Front Street (River Park Drive) Historic District (ID84001222)
- NRHP reference No.: 79000891
- Added to NRHP: April 26, 1979

The Albertus Building, also known as the Gutenberg Haus, or locally as “The Rathskeller” (now the official business name) is a historic building located in Guttenberg, Iowa, United States. The two-and three-story structure of locally quarried limestone was completed around 1855 by C. Albertus. A unique feature of the building are the pointed arch doorways and windows, which have not been found on similar commercial buildings in Iowa. The building was initially used for a combination of commercial and residential use. Clothing and grocery stores were located on the first floor of the southern three-story block. By 1886 the northern two-story block was all residential, and by 1894 the whole building had gone residential.

The building was individually listed on the National Register of Historic Places on April 26, 1979. In 1984 it was listed as a contributing property in the Front Street (River Park Drive) Historic District.
