= Eckert House (Guttenberg, Iowa) =

Historic house in Iowa, United States

- U.S. National Register of Historic Places
- Location within Iowa Location within the United States
- Location: 413 S. 1st St. Guttenberg, Iowa
- Coordinates: 42°46′56.4″N 91°05′47.2″W
- Area: less than one acre
- Built: 1860
- Architect: Henry Eckert
- MPS: Guttenberg MRA
- NRHP reference No.: 84001216
- Added to NRHP: September 24, 1984

The Eckert House is a historic building located in Guttenberg, Iowa, United States. The two-story brick structure was built in 1860 by Henry Eckert. It is a combination commercial and residential building that features an off-square layout, metal "S" beam hardware on the north wall that was used to accommodate its unique shape, and metal numbers on the exterior that date the structure, which is not the norm in Guttenberg. Ida Eckert operated a millinery shop in first floor commercial space. The building was listed on the National Register of Historic Places in 1984.
