= Schmidt House (Elkader, Iowa) =

Historic house in Iowa, United States

- U.S. National Register of Historic Places
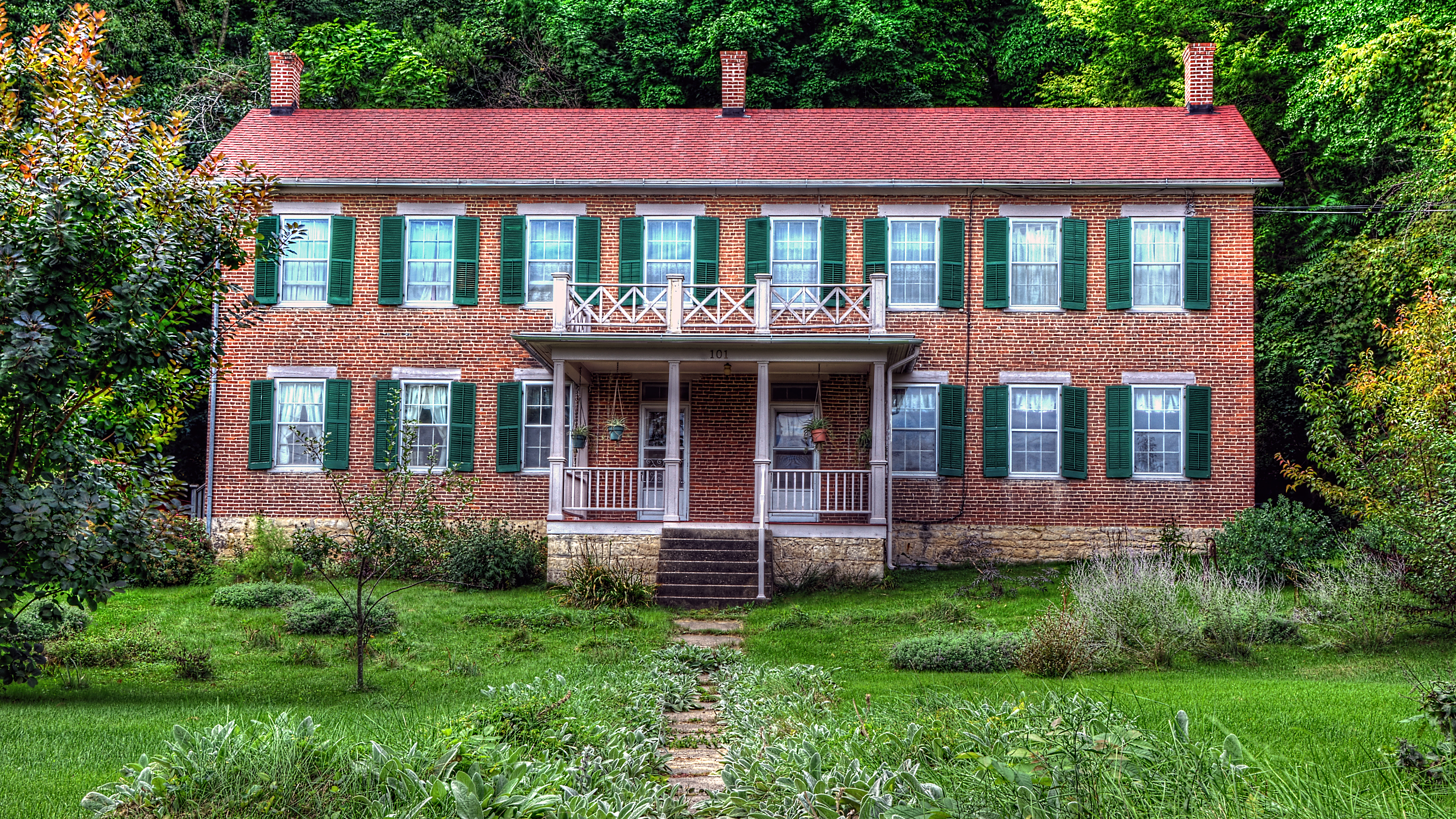

- Location within Iowa Location within the United States
- Location: 101 Oak, NW. Elkader, Iowa
- Coordinates: 42°51′10.8″N 91°24′26.6″W
- Area: less than one acre
- Built: 1867
- Built by: Henry Behnke
- NRHP reference No.: 77000503
- Added to NRHP: March 25, 1977

The Schmidt House, also known as the Bandow Apartments, is a historic building located in Elkader, Iowa, United States. The two-story brick structure was built in 1867 by Wolfgang and John Blasius Schmidt, who were immigrants from Bavaria. They built their brewery next to the house, no longer extant, and it remained in operation until 1884 when prohibition passed in Iowa. The duplex is a vernacular form of the Federal style. At one time it had a common kitchen and dining room, with a summer kitchen, no longer extant, in the rear. The building was converted into apartments in the late 19th- or early 20th-century. It was listed on the National Register of Historic Places in 1977.
