= Valley Mills, West Virginia =

Valley Mills
- Unincorporated community
- Location within the state of West Virginia Valley Mills (the United States)
- Coordinates: 39°19′4″N 81°26′35″W
- Country: United States
- State: West Virginia
- County: Wood
- Elevation: 718 ft (219 m)
- Time zone: UTC-5 (Eastern (EST))
  - Summer (DST): UTC-4 (EDT)
- GNIS ID: 1553336

Valley Mills is an unincorporated community in Wood County, West Virginia, United States.
