= Wehmer House =

Historic house in Iowa, United States

- U.S. National Register of Historic Places
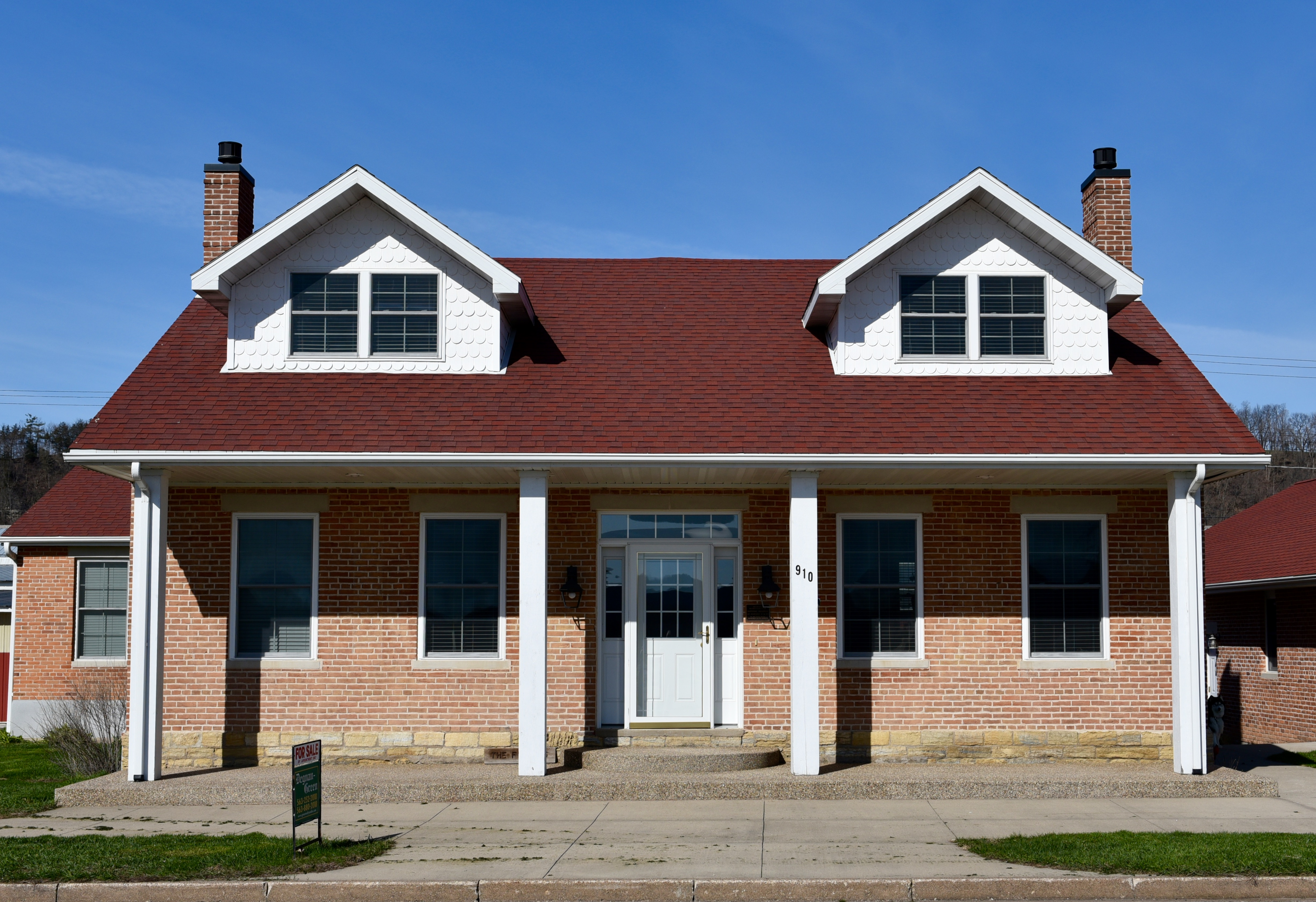

- Location within Iowa Location within the United States
- Location: 910 S. River Park Dr. Guttenberg, Iowa
- Coordinates: 42°46′3.2″N 91°05′44″W
- Area: less than one acre
- Built: 1862
- Built by: George Wehmer
- MPS: Guttenberg MRA
- NRHP reference No.: 84001249
- Added to NRHP: September 24, 1984

The Wehmer House is a historic building located in Guttenberg, Iowa, United States. This 1½-story brick building was constructed by George Wehmer between 1856 and 1862. The adjacent lumber yard owned the house by 1900, but it returned to being a private residence by mid-century. Initially it was designed as a duplex with a unit on both side of a shared entrance. The chimneys on each side are connected to fireplaces. The dormers on the front of the side gable roof were added later and are not original. The building was listed on the National Register of Historic Places in 1984.
