= Ceres, Iowa =

- Unincorporated community
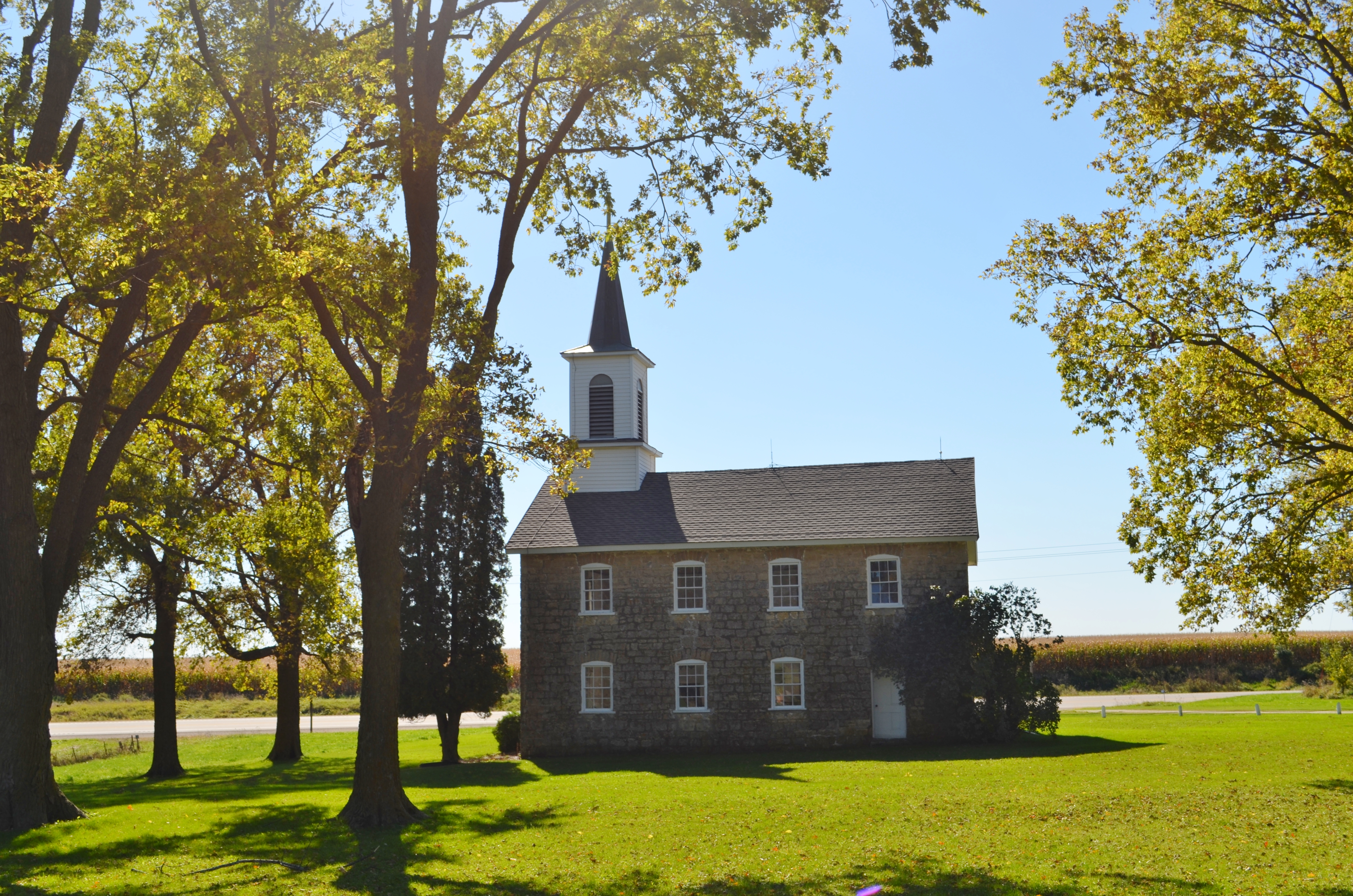
- St. Peters United Evangelical Lutheran Church

- Location within Iowa Location within the United States
- Coordinates: 42.8205438°N 91.1862415°W
- Country: United States
- State: Iowa
- County: Clayton
- Elevation: 1,024 ft (312 m)
- Time zone: UTC-6 (Central (CST))
  - Summer (DST): UTC-5 (CDT)
- Zip codes: 52049
- Area code: 563
- GNIS feature ID: 464495

Ceres is an unincorporated community in Clayton County, Iowa, United States. Ceres once had a post office, which has since been abandoned. The county seat of Elkader lies approximately 11 miles to the west.
