= Christian Bloedel Wagon Works =

- U.S. National Register of Historic Places
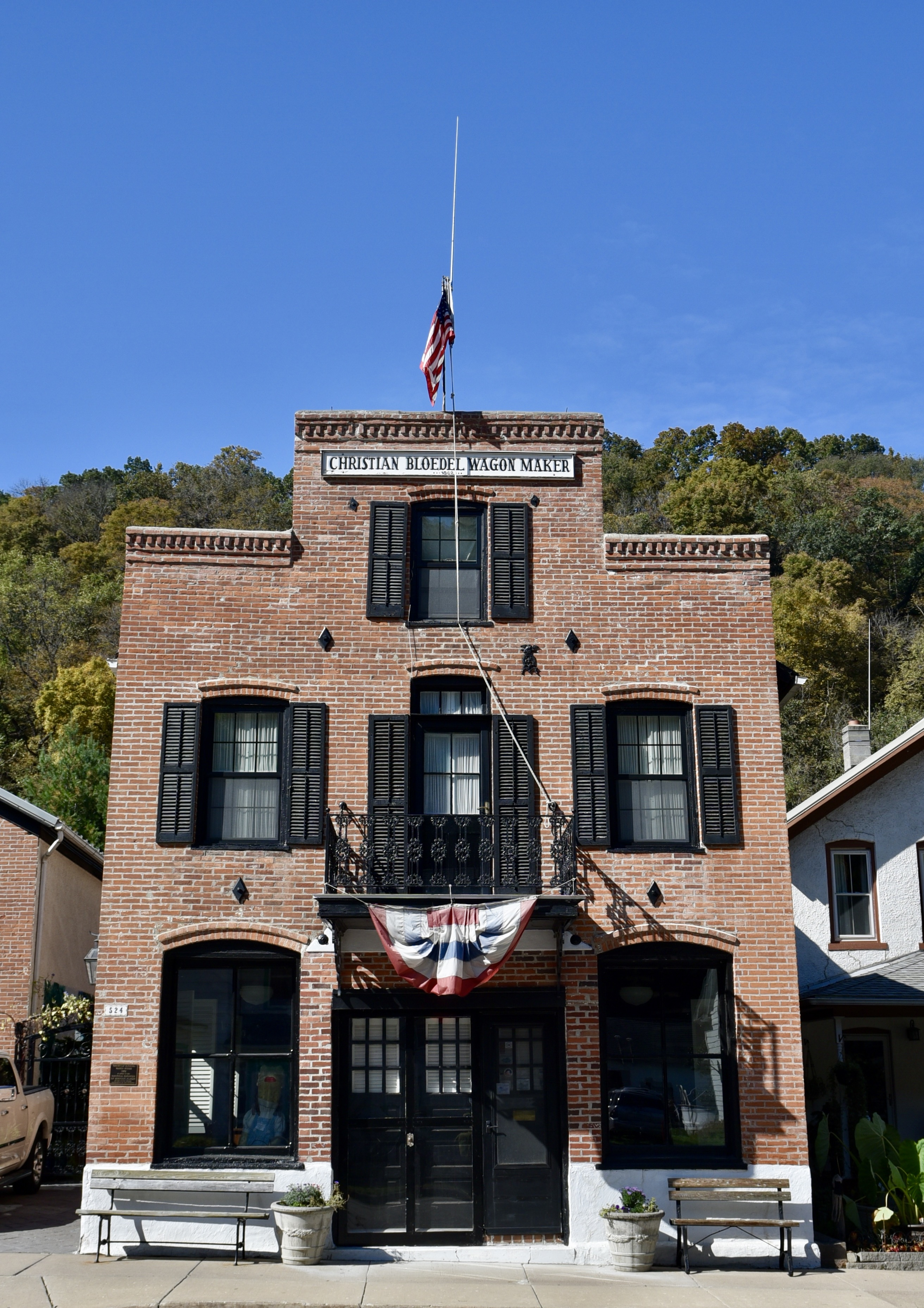
- The main wagon shop (1862)

- Location within Iowa Location within the United States
- Location: 524-526 Main St. McGregor, Iowa
- Coordinates: 43°01′12.6″N 91°10′50.9″W
- Area: less than one acre
- Built: 1862, 1887
- Architectural style: Italianate
- NRHP reference No.: 09000765
- Added to NRHP: September 23, 2009

Christian Bloedel Wagon Works, also known as The Brick Shop and Bloedel & Son Wagon Works, are two historic buildings located in McGregor, Iowa, United States. The main wagon shop and manufacturing facility sits closest to the street. It was completed in 1862 in the Italianate style. The stepped brick parapet of the main facade masks its gabled roofline. The shop was located on the main floor of the brick structure, and residential space was located on the second floor. The second building, which is set further back, was constructed of brick around 1887. It housed the wagon work's paint shop on the first floor and residential space on the second floor. Other buildings that were at one time part of this facility are no longer extant. The buildings were listed together on the National Register of Historic Places in 2009.
