= Peter Stauer House =

Historic house in Iowa, United States

- U.S. National Register of Historic Places
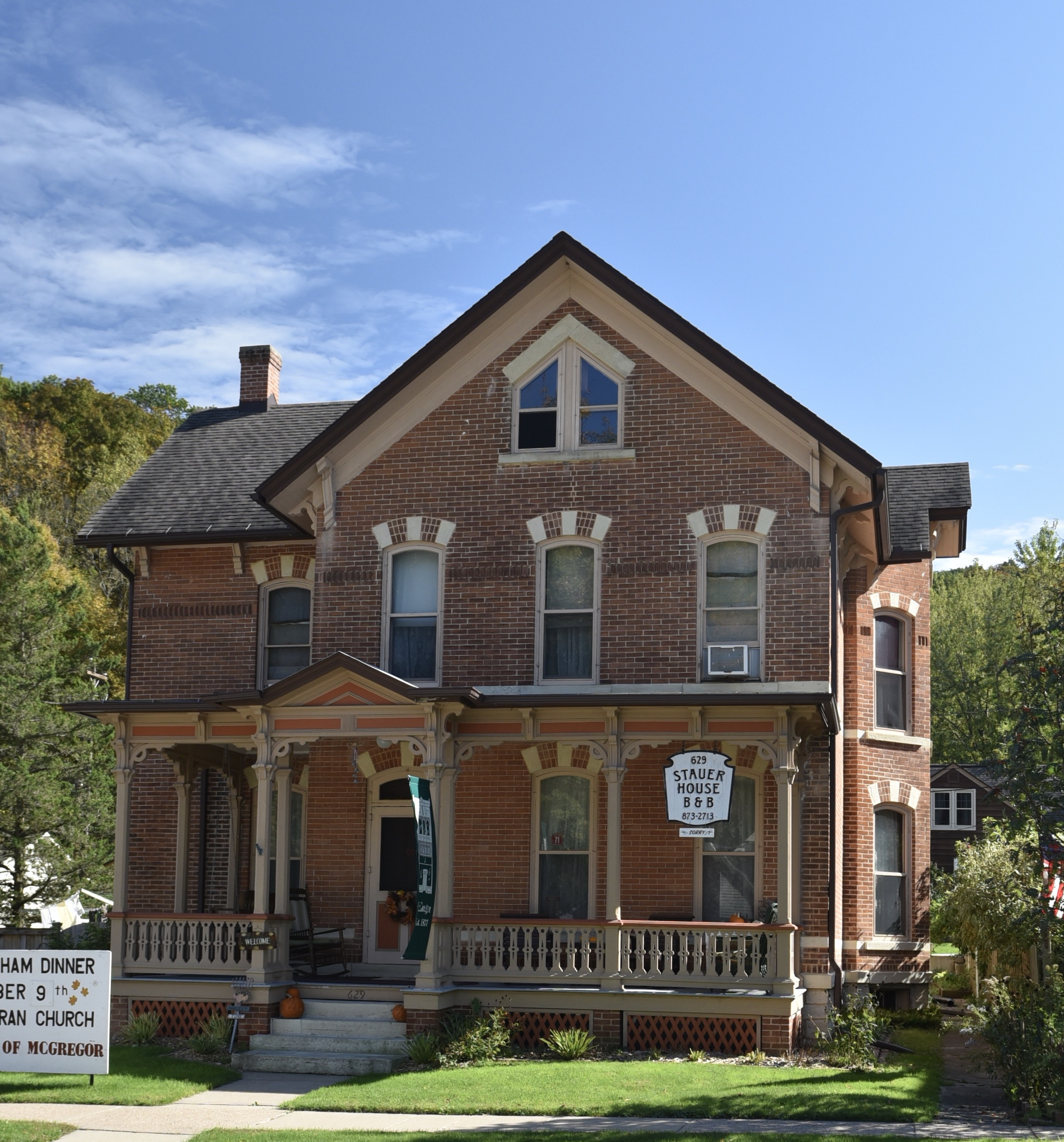

- Location within Iowa Location within the United States
- Location: 629 Main St. McGregor, Iowa
- Coordinates: 43°01′06.5″N 91°10′55.3″W
- Area: less than one acre
- Built: 1882
- Architect: Elias White Hale Jacobs
- Architectural style: Late Victorian
- NRHP reference No.: 03000914
- Added to NRHP: September 13, 2003

The Peter Stauer House is a historic building located in McGregor, Iowa, United States. Completed in 1882, it is a two-story brick structure that features stone details, an attached frame wing on the back, a cross gable roof, and a wooden porch. Local architect Elias White Hale Jacobs designed the house in the Queen Anne style. Two prominent McGregor businessmen, Peter Stauer and J. A. Ramage, owned it consecutively. The house was listed on the National Register of Historic Places in 2003.
