= Rialto Price House =

Historic building located in Elkader, Iowa, United States

- U.S. National Register of Historic Places
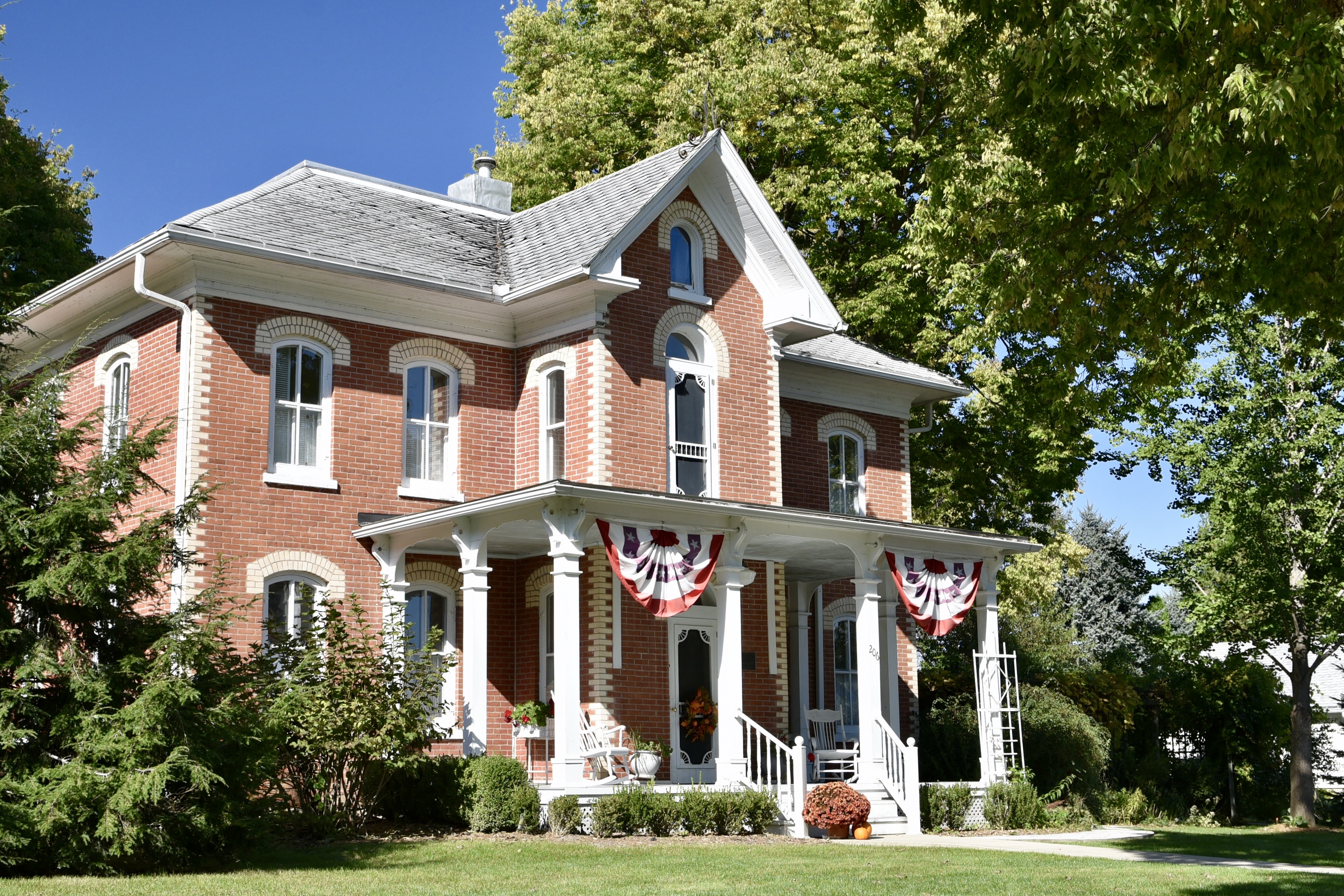

- Location within Iowa Location within the United States
- Location: 206 Cedar St., NW; Elkader, Iowa
- Coordinates: 42°51′16.2″N 91°24′25.8″W
- Area: less than one acre
- Built: 1876
- NRHP reference No.: 76000749
- Added to NRHP: November 21, 1976

The Rialto Price House is a historic building located in Elkader, Iowa, United States. Price was a local attorney. His Victorian-style brick house was built in 1876 on the property where the first brick house in town is said to have been located. The two-story red brick structure features buff brick decoration, and a gable-roofed front entry that protrudes from the main facade. The front porch is not original to the house. The house was listed on the National Register of Historic Places in 1976.
