= Valley Mills (Garnavillo, Iowa) =

- U.S. National Register of Historic Places
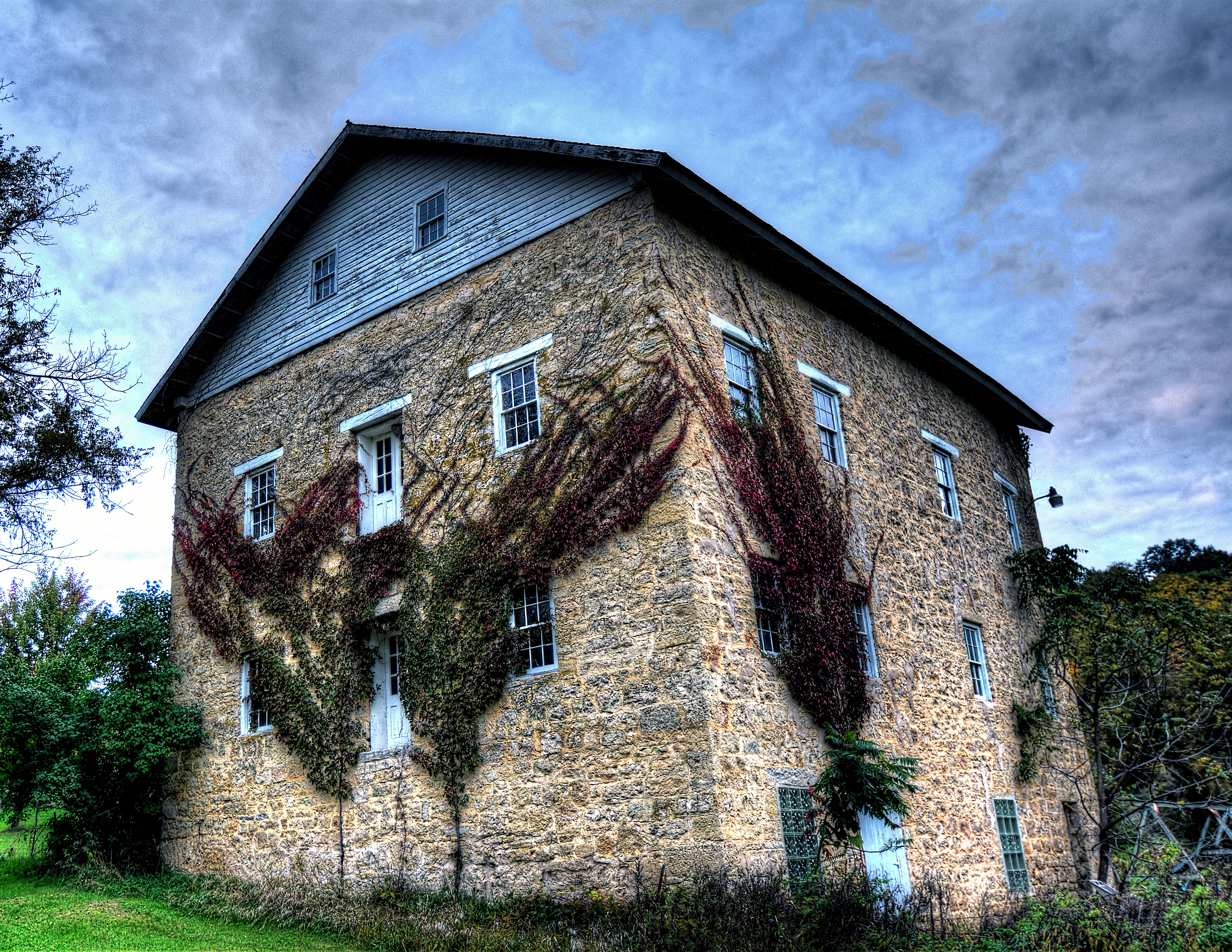

- Location within Iowa Location within the United States
- Location: East of Garnavillo
- Coordinates: 42°51′50.5″N 91°11′34.6″W
- Built: 1853
- NRHP reference No.: 76000752
- Added to NRHP: December 12, 1976

Valley Mills is a historic building located east of Garnavillo, Iowa, United States. This is one of at least four mills that was located on Buck Creek in the 19th century. They included both grist and lumber mills. The first mill located on this site was a lumber mill built in 1850. A change in ownership and an expansion of the business led to the construction of this grist mill three years later. The two-story structure is composed of roughly dressed limestone, has an exposed basement, and is capped with a gable roof. It was built for B. E. Schroeder and J. H. Kueuzel, who owned the mill until 1867. Kueuzel then held sole ownership into the 1880s. The building was listed on the National Register of Historic Places in 1976.
