= Lock and Dam No. 10 =

Dam in Iowa and Wisconsin, U.S.

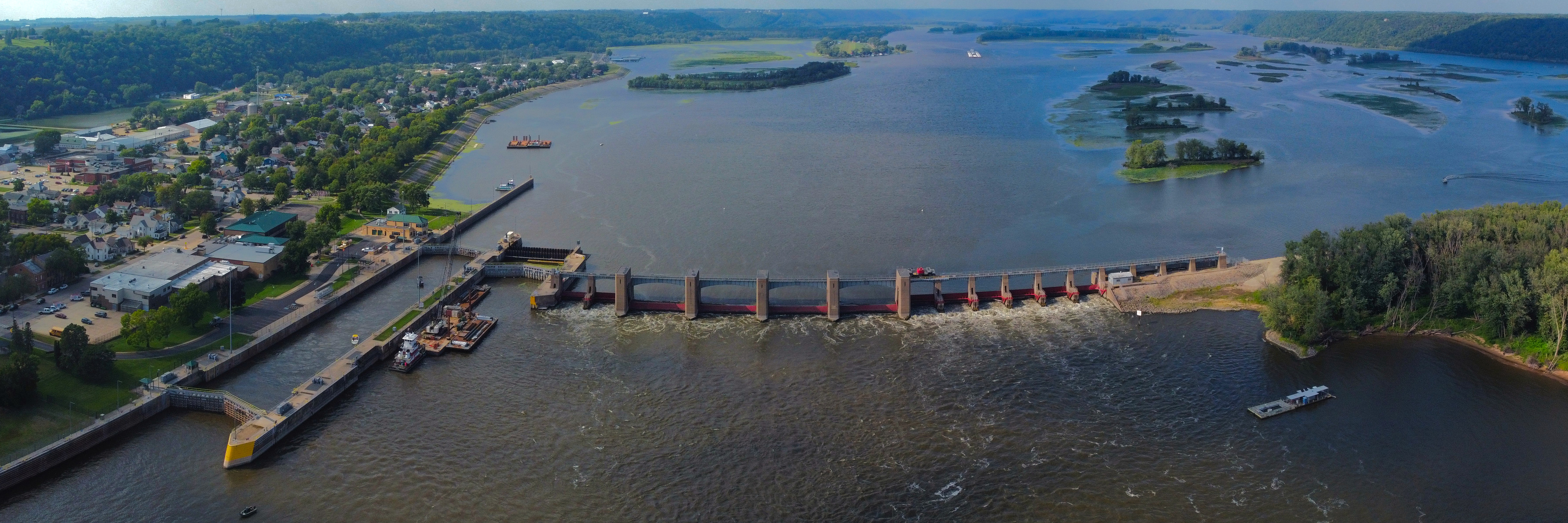
- Mississippi River Lock and Dam number 10

- Location within Iowa
- Location: Guttenberg, Clayton County, Iowa / Glen Haven, Grant County, Wisconsin, USA
- Coordinates: 42°47′06″N 91°05′42″W
- Construction began: 1934; 92 years ago
- Opening date: November 1937; 89 years ago
- Operators: U.S. Army Corps of Engineers, St. Paul District

Dam and spillways
- Impounds: Upper Mississippi River
- Length: 5,447 feet (1,660.2 m)

Reservoir
- Creates: Pool 10
- Total capacity: 212,000 acre⋅ft (0.261 km^{3})
- Catchment area: 79,370 mi^{2} (205,600 km^{2})

Lock and Dam No. 10 is a lock and dam located in Guttenberg, Iowa on the Upper Mississippi River around river mile 615.0. It was constructed and placed in operation November 1937. The site underwent major rehabilitation 1989—2006. The dam consists of a concrete dam 763 feet (232.6 m) long with four roller gates and eight tainter gates. The earth embankment is 4,223 feet (1,287.2 m) long with a concrete spillway 1,200 feet (365.8 m) long. The lock is 110 feet (33.5 m) wide by 600 feet (182.9 m) long. The lock and dam are owned and operated by the St. Paul District of the United States Army Corps of Engineers-Mississippi Valley Division.

The Friends of Pool 10 is a volunteer organization dedicated to the cleanup of the sloughs, backwaters and islands of the pool. Its first annual cleanup was in April 2007.

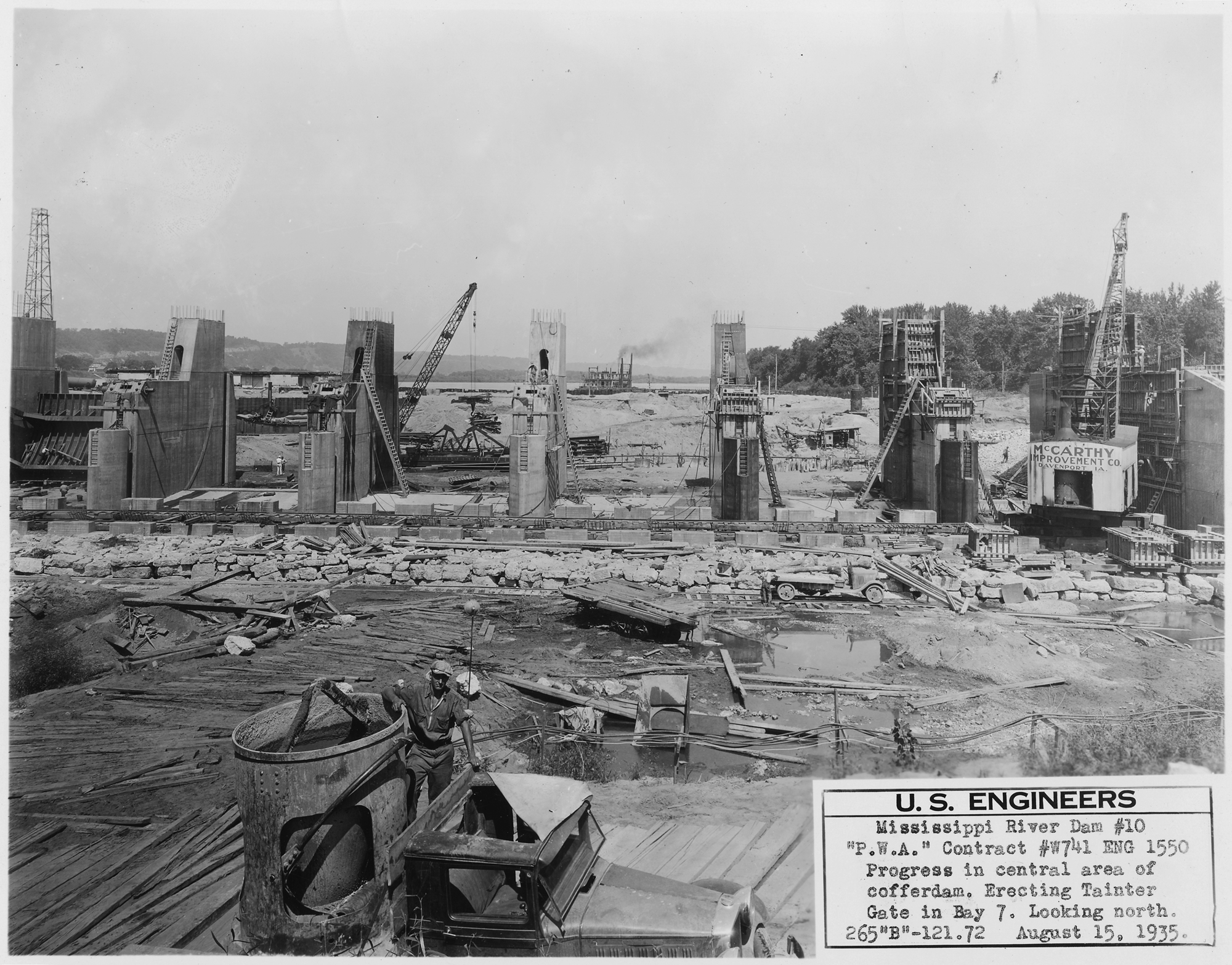
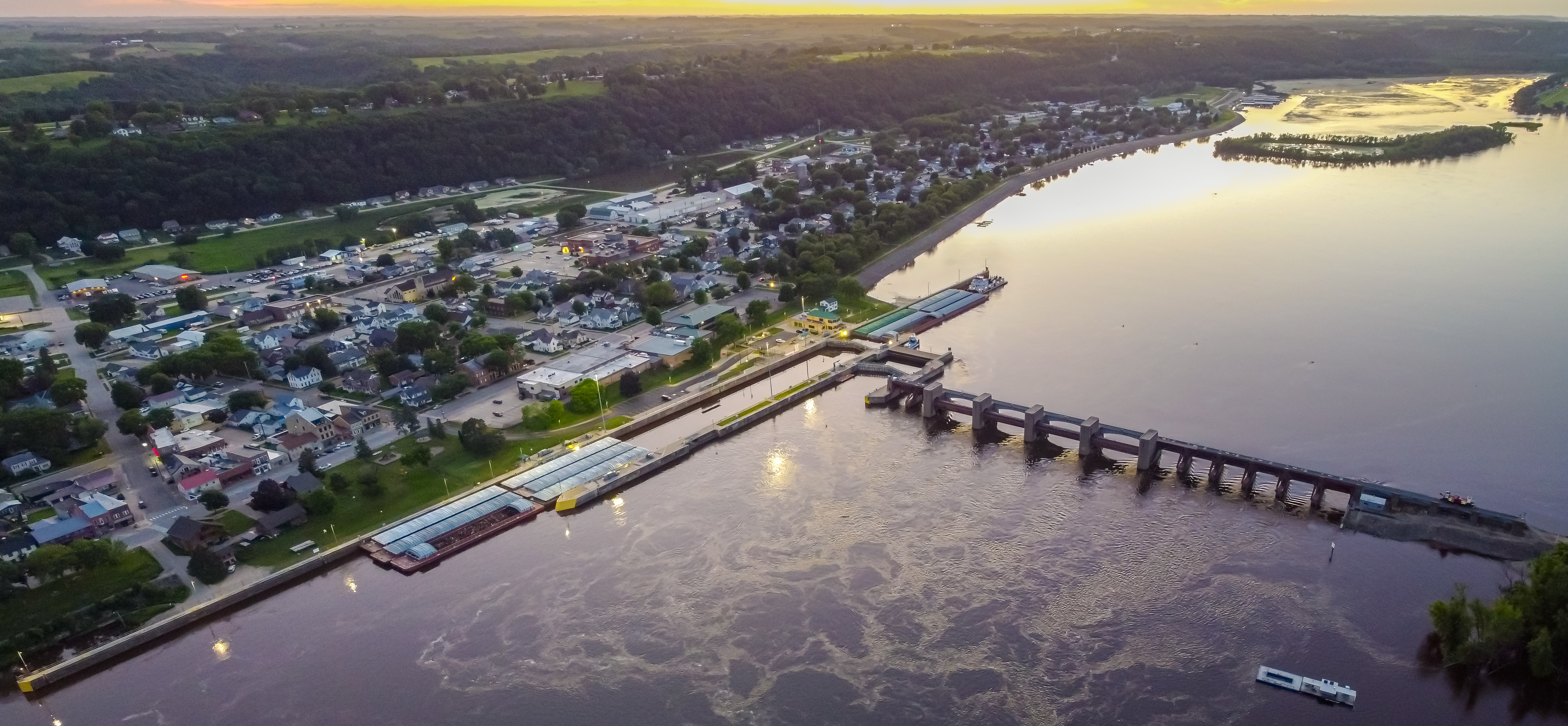

== See also ==
- Public Works Administration dams list
- Upper Mississippi River National Wildlife and Fish Refuge
