= Motor, Iowa =

- Motor Townsite
- U.S. National Register of Historic Places
- U.S. Historic district
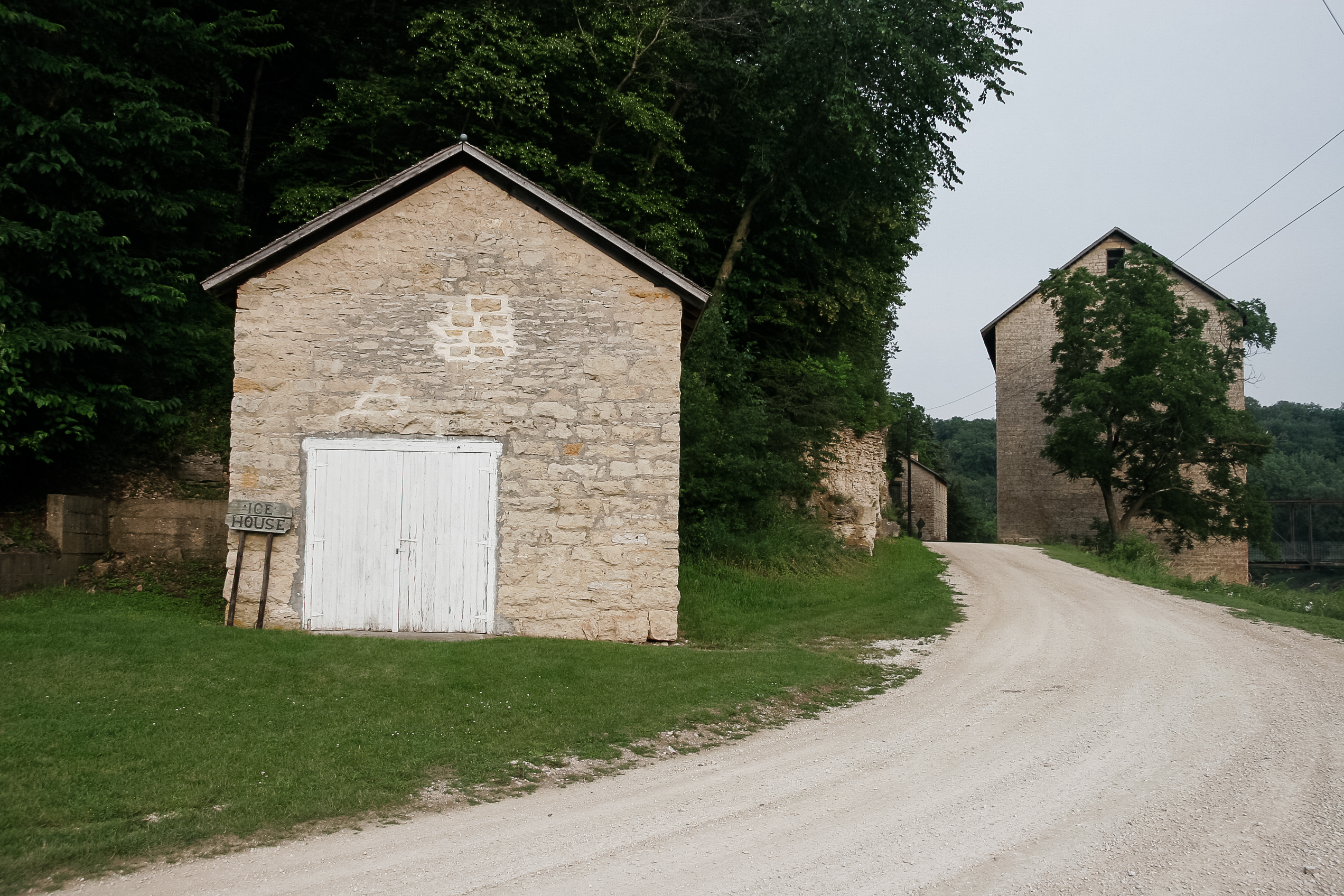

- Location within Iowa Location within the United States
- Location: East of Elkader
- Coordinates: 42°48′28″N 91°21′05″W
- Area: 17 acres (6.9 ha)
- NRHP reference No.: 77000502
- Added to NRHP: August 2, 1977

Motor is an unincorporated community in Clayton County, Iowa, United States. The townsite is also a nationally recognized historic district listed as a historic site on the National Register of Historic Places in 1977.

== History ==
John Thompson, J.P. Dickinson and James O. Crosby formed a partnership in October, 1867 called John Thompson and Company. They planned to build a gristmill, a sawmill, a farm and a town that they called Motor. The site they chose had been the location of a previous sawmill named the Downey Mill at Hastings Bottom. They began construction of the mill cooperage in August 1867, finishing the mill in December 1869. The mill was in operation by 1870, and a formal town plat was submitted for taxation at the Clayton County Courthouse in August, 1875. Because of his success with establishing mills in nearby Elkader and Clermont, John Thompson was confident that Motor would be equally successful. The townsite includes the gristmill, a bridge across the Turkey River, cooperage, smoke house, an old inn, and the livery barn. The site also contained a few houses, a school, general store and sawmill.

A narrow-gauge railway was completed within 4 miles (6.4 km) of Motor in 1874. A station house was built, a station agent was hired, and track was scheduled to be laid in 1875, but a flood wiped out the ties and the railroad never made it to Motor. Chinch bugs wiped out the local wheat crop and local farmers moved on to other crops. In July, 1883, a major flood caused the operation of the mill to cease forever as a milling operation. The original investors were no longer interested in maintaining or updating the mill as stone grinding was becoming a thing of the past. The partnership that built the town dissolved. From 1883 to 1903 the properties were rented to local farmers until Louis Klink bought the property in 1903. He sold the mill machinery and he used the buildings for his farm operation. The property remained in the family for 80 years. The Clayton County Conservation Board acquired the property in 1983. The area is now a 155-acre (63 ha) park with hiking trails, a primitive campground, and a place to launch canoes. It is part of the Silos & Smokestacks National Heritage Area.

Motor's population was 22 in 1902, and 26 in 1915.
