= National Register of Historic Places listings in Fayette County, Iowa =

Location of Fayette County in Iowa

This is a list of the National Register of Historic Places listings in Fayette County, Iowa.

This is intended to be a complete list of the properties and districts on the National Register of Historic Places in Fayette County, Iowa, United States. Latitude and longitude coordinates are provided for many National Register properties and districts; these locations may be seen together in a map.

There are 29 properties listed on the National Register in the county.

This National Park Service list is complete through NPS recent listings posted January 30, 2026.

	Name on the Register	Image	Date listed	Location	City or town	Description
1	Abraham Lincoln Statue and Park	Abraham Lincoln Statue and Park	October 30, 2000 (#00001197)	Junction of Mill and Stone; 43°00′13″N 91°39′53″W	Clermont	
2	Bigler Building	Bigler Building	June 9, 1995 (#95000691)	210 Mill St. 43°00′01″N 91°39′22″W	Clermont	
3	Chicago, Milwaukee, St. Paul and Pacific Railroad Company Depot		December 28, 1978 (#78001219)	Northeast of Fayette off Iowa Highway 150; 42°52′01″N 91°47′05″W	Fayette	
4	Church of the Saviour Episcopal Church and David Henderson Statue	Church of the Saviour Episcopal Church and David Henderson Statue	October 30, 2000 (#00001196)	Junction of Mill and Thompson; 43°00′10″N 91°39′14″W	Clermont	
5	Clermont Public School	Clermont Public School	November 22, 1995 (#95001316)	505 Larrabee St. 42°59′48″N 91°39′11″W	Clermont	
6	College Hall	College Hall	November 7, 1976 (#76000770)	200 block of E. Clark; 42°50′30″N 91°48′07″W	Fayette	
7	Eldorado Bridge	Eldorado Bridge	June 25, 1998 (#98000783)	State St. over the Turkey River; 43°03′13″N 91°50′05″W	Eldorado	
8	The Elgin Block		May 8, 2008 (#08000374)	225-231 Center St. 42°57′26″N 91°37′37″W	Elgin	
9	Fayette County Courthouse	Fayette County Courthouse	July 2, 1981 (#81000236)	Pine St. 42°57′38″N 91°48′21″W	West Union	
10	First Baptist Church of West Union	First Baptist Church of West Union	October 7, 1999 (#99001240)	Main and Vine Sts. 42°57′46″N 91°48′31″W	West Union	
11	Grimes Octagon Barn	Grimes Octagon Barn	June 30, 1986 (#86001428)	Off Iowa Highway 56; 42°56′10″N 91°45′01″W	West Union	
12	Alfred Hanson House	Alfred Hanson House	July 12, 1984 (#84001252)	403 N. Frederick Ave. 42°41′01″N 91°54′46″W	Oelwein	
13	Hardware Building		July 15, 1977 (#77000516)	223 Mill St. 42°50′23″N 91°39′25″W	Wadena	
14	Hobson Block	Hobson Block	November 7, 2008 (#08001042)	110-114 S. Vine St. 42°57′40″N 91°48′29″W	West Union	
15	Hotel Mealey	Hotel Mealey	January 27, 1983 (#83000357)	102 S. Frederick Ave. 42°40′37″N 91°54′49″W	Oelwein	
16	Maple View Sanitarium	Maple View Sanitarium	July 21, 1998 (#98000866)	100 N. Walnut St. 42°57′41″N 91°48′22″W	West Union	
17	Maynard Town Hall and Jail	Maynard Town Hall and Jail	October 30, 1997 (#97001286)	330 Main St., W. 42°46′42″N 91°53′11″W	Maynard	
18	Mill Race Bridge	Mill Race Bridge	June 25, 1998 (#98000784)	Pheasant Rd. over the Turkey River; 43°04′39″N 91°53′21″W	Eldorado	
19	Montauk	Montauk	February 21, 1973 (#73000725)	1 mile northeast of Clermont on U.S. Route 18; 43°00′49″N 91°38′25″W	Clermont	Home of William Larrabee, 12th Governor of Iowa, built in 1874. Property includes a caretaker's house, barn, machine shed, work shop, ice house-creamery and laundry buildings.
20	August Nus Polygonal Barn		June 30, 1986 (#86001427)	County Road C2, W. 42°45′35″N 91°38′23″W	Arlington	1906 flat roofed clay tile polygon shaped barn, one of 4 known to have been built in Iowa.
21	Otter Creek Bridge	Otter Creek Bridge	June 25, 1998 (#98000781)	40th St. over Otter Creek; 42°41′10″N 91°56′49″W	Oelwein	1917 concrete bridge constructed by day laborers.
22	St. Luke's School and Recreation Center		August 24, 2005 (#05000899)	212 East Main; 43°04′01″N 91°55′49″W	St. Lucas	
23	Stoe Creek Bridge		June 25, 1998 (#98000782)	V Ave. over Stoe Creek; 42°47′30″N 92°00′08″W	Oelwein	Replaced in 2007
24	Sumner Bridge		June 25, 1998 (#98000785)	160th St. over the Little Wapsipinicon River; 43°04′39″N 91°53′21″W	Sumner	
25	Twin Bridge	Twin Bridge	June 25, 1998 (#98000779)	130th St. over the Little Volga River; 42°50′04″N 91°51′53″W	Fayette	
26	Union Sunday School	Union Sunday School	November 5, 1974 (#74000785)	McGregor and Larrabee Sts. 43°00′10″N 91°39′25″W	Clermont	
27	Vine Street Bridge	Vine Street Bridge	June 25, 1998 (#98000780)	South Vine St. over Otter Creek; 42°57′16″N 91°48′29″W	West Union	
28	West Auburn Bridge	West Auburn Bridge	June 25, 1998 (#98000786)	Near Neon Rd. over the Turkey River; 43°00′59″N 91°52′43″W	West Union	
29	West Union Commercial Historic District	West Union Commercial Historic District	May 4, 2015 (#15000191)	Roughly bounded by N. and S. Vine, Main, Walnut, and Plum Streets; 42°57′41″N 91°48′26″W	West Union	

== See also ==
- List of National Historic Landmarks in Iowa
- National Register of Historic Places listings in Iowa
- Listings in neighboring counties: Allamakee, Black Hawk, Bremer, Chickasaw, Clayton, Delaware, Winneshiek
