= Tri-Rivers Conference =

Iowa High School athletic conference

- Conference: IHSAA / IGHSAU
- Founded: 1967
- Sports fielded: 13
- No. of teams: 14
- Region: Eastern Iowa
- Website: https://www.tririversconference.org/

The Tri-Rivers Conference is a high school conference in eastern Iowa sponsoring athletic competition, as well as speech and music activities. Formed in 1967, the conference has enjoyed long-term stability while enduring periods of significant change over its 50-plus year history. With the return of Edgewood–Colesburg in 2017 (after a brief 4-year hiatus), all but one of the founding members were still conference members. (Center Point, following its merger with Urbana, simply out-grew its former competitors).

== Members ==
Institution	High school location	Mascot	Colors	Affiliation	2026-2027 BEDS
East Division
Calamus–Wheatland	Wheatland	Warriors		Public	90
Cedar Valley Christian	Cedar Rapids	Huskies		Private	35
Easton Valley	Preston	River Hawks		Public	103
Marquette Catholic	Bellevue	Defenders		Private	48
Midland	Wyoming	Eagles		Public	118
North Cedar	Stanwood	Knights		Public	111
Prince of Peace Prep	Clinton	Irish		Private	51
West Division
Central City	Central City	Wildcats		Public	69
East Buchanan	Winthrop	Buccaneers		Public	118
Edgewood–Colesburg	Edgewood	Vikings		Public	95
Maquoketa Valley	Delhi	Wildcats		Public	157
North Linn	Troy Mills	Lynx		Public	108
Springville	Springville	Orioles		Public	96
Starmont	Arlington	Stars		Public	130

== Historic roots of the Tri-Rivers Conference ==
The conference's roots go back to the annual Linn County basketball tournament, first played in 1929–30. High schools competing throughout most of the 1930s, 40s and 50s included Alburnett, Center Point, Central City, Coggon, Ely, Lisbon, Mt.Vernon, Palo, Springville, Toddville, Troy Mills, Viola and Walker. These 13 schools were all located outside the Cedar Rapids-Marion urban area and the high schools generally had significantly smaller enrollments than their urban counterparts.

In January 1951, 8 schools, Alburnett, Center Point, Central City, Palo, Toddville, Troy Mills, Viola and Walker, joined together to form what was tentatively named the Upper Linn basketball league. Coggon and Springville attended the meeting but decided not to join, while Lisbon was already affiliated with the Wapsi-Eight league, Mt. Vernon was affiliated with the Eastern Iowa league, and Ely was no longer a high school. Ultimately renamed simply the Linn County league, the new league would begin play in 1951–52. Toddville merged with Alburnett beginning with the 1953–54 season, reducing the Linn County league to 7 schools. The league would play its 4th and final season in 1954–55.

Beginning in 1955–56, the Linn County league was succeeded by the 7-member All-Ac (All Activities) league. The new league was formed by 5 of the 7 remaining Linn County league schools: Alburnett, Center Point, Central City, Troy Mills and Walker, joined by Coggon and by Winthrop, from Buchanan County. (Palo and Viola took different paths and their high schools would both close by the early 1960s.) In early 1957, superintendents of the 12 non-metro schools in Linn County voted to not hold the boys and girls county basketball tournaments in 1957–58 and to drop the county music festival as well; both examples of county-based institutions giving way to conference-based ones. In 1959–60, the new Linn-Mar (Marion) high school joined the All-Ac bringing it to 8 schools, and in 1960–61, Winthrop, Aurora and Quasqueton merged to form East Buchanan, bringing the later two communities into the league. East Buchanan would leave after the 1961–62 season, but Springville joined in 1962–63 keeping league membership at 8.

During the 1960s, as high school football's popularity rapidly grew, Central City, Coggon and Linn-Mar (All-Ac members with early football programs), joined with Lincoln (Stanwood), Midland (Wyoming) and Olin to form the Pinicon football conference, beginning play in the fall of 1964. Center Point joined the Pinicon beginning with the 1965 season, and Springville joined for 1966, bringing the football league membership to 8, 5 of them active members of the All-Ac conference. The fall of 1966 would be the third and final year of the Pinicon as the soon-to-be-formed Tri-Rivers conference would include football and begin play in the fall of 1967.

1966–67 would also be the final year of the All-Ac. Coggon, Troy Mills and Walker remained a part of the league, but were playing their first year of competition as North Linn. And Linn-Mar was competing in both the All-Ac and East Central Iowa (ECI) league for one season in preparation for a complete move to the ECI the following year. The combined effect was a net loss of 3 teams, leading the All-Ac to reconfigure and reemerge the following season as the Tri-Rivers Conference.

== Tri-Rivers Conference history ==
The Tri-Rivers first season of athletic competition was 1967–68. The new conference included 5 teams from the former All-Ac that represented 8 of the 13 teams that had played basketball together since at least the late 1920s: Alburnett (and Toddville), Central City, Center Point, North Linn (Coggon, Troy Mills and Walker) and Springville. East Buchanan (Winthrop) returned to join its former All-Ac competitors following a 5-year hiatus in the Upper Mississippi League. Coming with East Buchanan from the Upper Mississippi was Edgewood–Colesburg and Maquoketa Valley (Delhi).

Starmont (former independent) joined the Tri-Rivers in 1974–75. Jesup (formerly in the Cedar-Wapsie league) joined the conference in 1987-88. In 1989–90, Center Point began 'whole sharing' with Urbana bringing Urbana into the conference as part of the Stormin' Pointers. Center Point and Urbana (CPU) officially merged in 1993-94. Jesup left the league after the 1997–98 school year for the North Iowa Cedar League.

In 2003–04, the Tri-Rivers expanded to 12 with the addition of Anamosa, Cascade, and Monticello from a struggling Big Bend Conference. At that point the conference was split into two divisions: River (larger schools) Anamosa, Cascade, CPU, Maquoketa Valley, Monticello and Starmont, and Valley (smaller schools) Alburnett, Central City, East Buchanan, Edgewood–Colesburg, North Linn and Springville. After the 2006–07 school year, Anamosa and CPU (then 2 of the conference's 3 largest schools) left for the WaMaC where they would be competing against schools closer to their own size. At that point the smaller 10-member Tri-Rivers conference reverted to a single-division format.

A 2012 order from the Iowa Department of Education would force a realignment of conferences in eastern Iowa. In anticipation of the changes Starmont and Edgewood–Colesburg moved to the Upper Iowa Conference beginning with the 2013–14 school year.

When the state order was finalized, its changes took effect beginning with the 2013–14 school year and locked schools into the state-dictated conference alignments for 4 years. The order moved Cascade and Monticello from the Tri-Rivers to the newly formed River Valley Conference. The order dissolved the Big East Conference, and expanded the Tri-Rivers to 13 teams. Coming from the disbanded Big East were Bellevue Marquette, Calamus–Wheatland, Clinton Prince of Peace, Easton Valley (Preston), Lisbon and Midland (Wyoming). Also placed in the Tri-Rivers was Cedar Valley Christian (CVC) of Cedar Rapids, which began competing in 2011–12 as an independent, but had been seeking conference affiliation.

The resulting Tri-Rivers conference split itself into two divisions: West (the remaining original members plus Lisbon) Alburnett, Central City, East Buchanan, Lisbon, Maquoketa Valley, North Linn and Springville, and East (former Big East members plus CVC) Bellevue Marquette, Calamus–Wheatland, Clinton Prince of Peace, CVC, Easton Valley and Midland.

In 2017–18, when the state-imposed alignments expired, Edgewood–Colesburg rejoined the conference as a member of the West division and Lisbon moved to the East division. In 2018–19, Starmont rejoined as a member of the West division.

The 2022-2023 academic year saw former River Valley Conference member North Cedar join the conference bringing membership of the Tri-Rivers conference to 16 teams.

In the Fall of 2025, Alburnett departed for the River Valley Conference reducing the number of teams to 15 once again. The following year, Lisbon also departed for the River Valley Conference.

== Tri-Rivers pro-athlete alumni ==
The conference has advanced at least three athletes to the pros:

Al Eberhard played for the Springville Orioles, and graduated from Springville High School, located in Springville, Iowa. Eberhard attended Missouri University from 1972–74 and played with the Missouri Tigers. A 6'6" power forward, he averaged 16.9 points a game in college, and was a first-round pick of the 1974 NBA draft by the Detroit Pistons. He played four seasons with the Pistons. Eberhard is a member of the Iowa High School Basketball Hall of Fame, as well as the Missouri Sports Hall of Fame.

Robert Gallery played for the East Buchanan Buccaneers and graduated from East Buchanan High School in Winthrop, Iowa. He played college football at the University of Iowa and professional football for the Oakland Raiders, Seattle Seahawks and the New England Patriots.

Jordan Eglseder of Marquette Catholic was a standout player before he went to University of Northern Iowa. He was then drafted into the NBA G-League in 2010.
