= Hardware Building =

Hardware Building may refer to:

- Hardware Building (Wadena, Iowa)
- Boggs Lumber and Hardware Building in Eckley, Colorado
- Briggs Hardware Building in Raleigh, North Carolina
- Doyle Hardware Building in Utica, New York
- Lipsett Hardware Building in Pickford, Michigan
- Loewenstein and Sons Hardware Building in Charleston, West Virginia
- Salt Lake Hardware Building in Salt Lake City, Utah
