= Mealey =

Mealey is a surname. Notable people with this surname include:

- Brian Mealey, American periodontist
- Damien Mealey, Australian cricketer
- Jack Mealey, American baseball catcher
- Katrina Mealey, American veterinary pharmacologist
- Linda Mealey, American evolutionary psychologist
- Phil Mealey, British actor
- Rondell Mealey, American football player
- Tobias Mealey, Canadian-born American entrepreneur

== See also ==
- Hotel Mealey, a historic building in Oelwein, Iowa
- Tobias G. Mealey House, a historic house in Monticello, Minnesota
- Mealey machine (also sometimes spelled Mealy Machine), a conceptual machine in computation theory
