= Mapleview =

Mapleview or Maple View may refer to:

- Mapleview, Minnesota, a small incorporated city north of and contiguous with Austin, Minnesota
- Maple View, New Brunswick, an unincorporated city in Victoria County, New Brunswick
- Maple View, West Virginia
- Mapleview Centre, a shopping mall in Burlington, Ontario, Canada
- Mapleview Heights Elementary School, a school in Barrie, Ontario
- Maple View, a community in the city of Quinte West, Ontario
- Maple View Sanitarium, in Fayette County, Iowa
