= Starmont Community School District =

Public school district in Arlington, Iowa, United States

Coordinates: 42.689109°N 91.648707°W

Starmont Valley Community School District

Location
- Arlington, Iowa Fayette, Clayton, Buchanan, and Delaware counties United States
- Coordinates: 42.689109, -91.648707

District information
- Type: Local school district
- Grades: K-12
- Established: 1964
- Superintendent: Troy Heller
- Schools: 3
- Budget: $9,667,000 (2020-21)
- NCES District ID: 1927270

Students and staff
- Students: 584 (2022-23)
- Teachers: 45.85 FTE
- Staff: 54.01 FTE
- Student–teacher ratio: 12.74
- Athletic conference: Upper Iowa
- District mascot: Stars
- Colors: Black and Gold

Other information
- Website: www.starmont.k12.ia.us

Starmont Community School District is a rural public school district headquartered in Arlington, Iowa.

The district is located in sections of Fayette, Clayton, Buchanan, and Delaware counties. It serves Arlington, Strawberry Point, Lamont, and the surrounding rural areas.

== History ==
The district was formed in 1964, as a consolidation of schools in Strawberry Point, Arlington, and Lamont.

The mascot is the Stars, and the colors are black and gold.

== Schools ==
The district operates three schools, all in a single facility in Arlington:

- Starmont Elementary School
- Starmont Middle School
- Starmont High School

== See also ==
- List of school districts in Iowa
