= Springville Community School District =

Public school district in Springville, Iowa, United States

Coordinates: 42.055478°N 91.444784°W

Location
- Springville, Iowa Linn County United States
- Coordinates: 42.055478, -91.444784

District information
- Type: Local school district
- Grades: K-12
- Superintendent: Pat Hocking
- Schools: 2
- Budget: $7,858,000 (2020-21)
- NCES District ID: 1927060

Students and staff
- Students: 438 (2022-23)
- Teachers: 37.95 FTE
- Staff: 27.84 FTE
- Student–teacher ratio: 11.54
- Athletic conference: Tri-Rivers
- District mascot: Orioles
- Colors: Black and Orange

Other information
- Website: www.springville.k12.ia.us

The Springville Community School District is a rural public school district headquartered in Springville, Iowa. The district is completely within Linn County, and serves the city of Springville and the surrounding rural areas.

The district is planning to renovate the elementary building by the summer of 2023 and secondary building by the summer of 2025.

== Schools ==
The district operates two schools in one facility in Springville:

- Springville Elementary School
- Springville Secondary School

=== Springville High School ===
==== Athletics ====
The Orioles participate in the Tri-Rivers Conference in the following sports:

- Football
- Cross Country
- Volleyball
- Basketball
  - Girls 3-time Class 1A State Champions (2008, 2016, 2017)
- Wrestling
- Golf
- Track and Field
- Baseball
- Softball

== See also ==
- List of school districts in Iowa
- List of high schools in Iowa
