= Coggon Public School =

- U.S. National Register of Historic Places
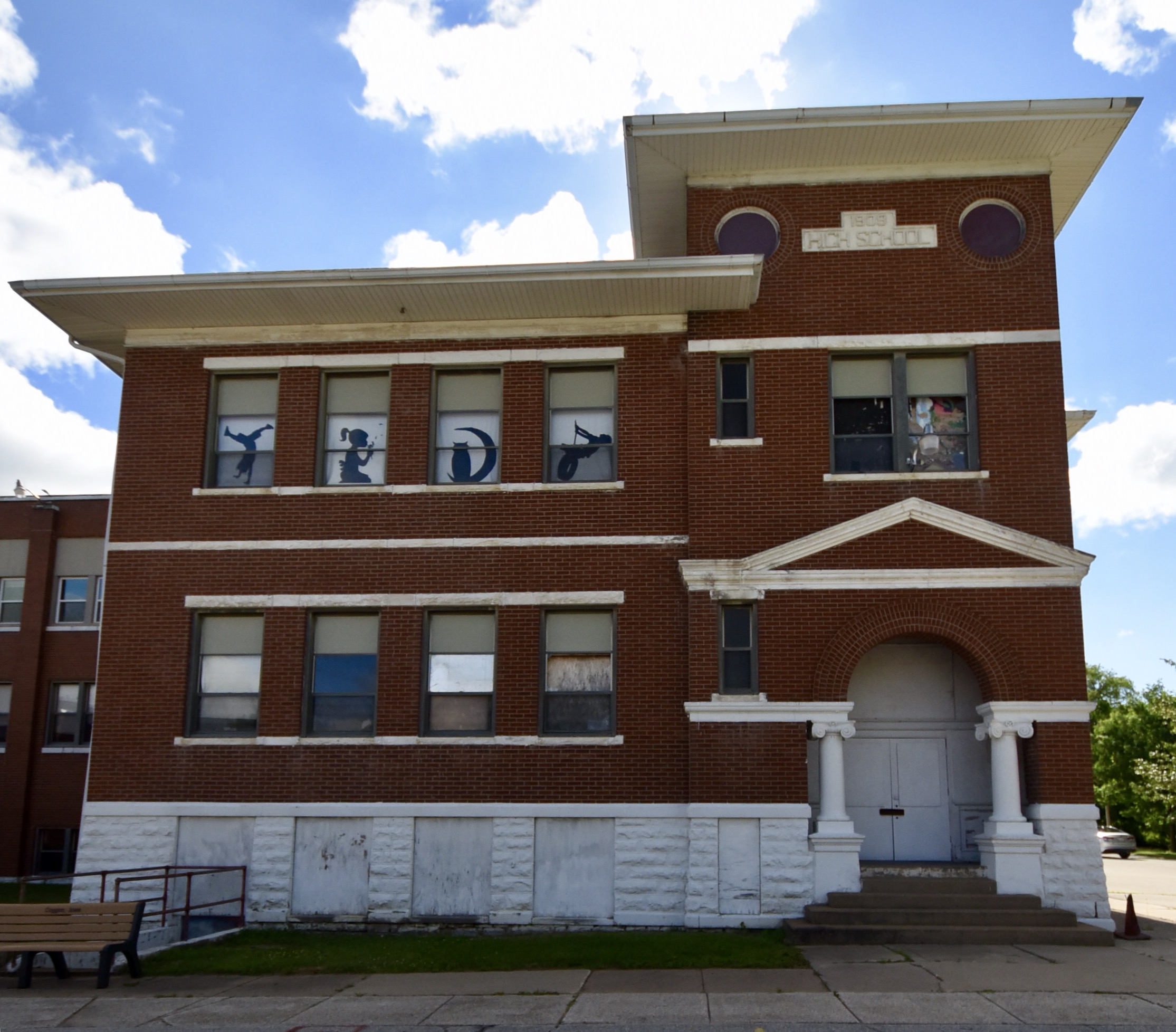
- 1909 building

- Location within Iowa Location within the United States
- Location: 408 E. Linn St. Coggon, Iowa
- Coordinates: 42°16′51.6″N 91°31′39.5″W
- Area: about 1 acre (0.40 ha)
- Built: 1909, 1936, 1957
- Built by: A.J. Bruce, et al.
- Architect: R.R. Mayberry; W. Jay Brown; N. Clifford Prall
- Architectural style: Late 19th & 20th Century Revivals; Modern Movement
- NRHP reference No.: 16000605
- Added to NRHP: September 12, 2016

Coggon Public School, also known as the Coggon Center, is a historic building located in Coggon, Iowa, United States.

== History ==
The chosen terminus for the community's Main Street in 1884 was its schoolhouse. A school building has remained on this property ever since. The 1890 school building was replaced by the first section of this building in 1909. Cedar Rapids architect R.R. Mayberry designed the two-story brick structure with Neoclassical styling, and A.J. Bruce was the contractor who built it. Cedar Rapids architect W. Jay Brown designed a 1936 addition in an industrial style and Des Moines architect N. Clifford Prall designed a 1957 addition in the Modern style.

== North Linn Community School District ==
The school districts in Coggon, Troy Mills, and Walker were combined in 1965 to form the North Linn Community School District. Prior to the merger the Coggon School had housed all grade levels, and after the merger it served as an elementary school. In 2011 a bond issue passed that consolidated the district's elementary program in the existing middle and high school building in Troy Mills. School operations in this building ceased that year. The building was acquired by the Coggon Area Betterment Association.

== Modern day ==
It now houses retail and community service organizations in part of the building that is known as the Coggon Center. The building was listed on the National Register of Historic Places in 2016.
