= Cedar Valley Christian School =

Private secondary school in Cedar Rapids, Iowa, United States

Coordinates: 41.996°N 91.615°W

Location
- 3636 Cottage Grove Ave SE, Cedar Rapids, IA 52403; United States

Information
- Motto: All Scripture is inspired by God and profitable for teaching, reproof, correction and training in righteousness.” (2 Timothy 3:16)
- Established: 1974
- Principal
- Grades: preschool - 12th
- Enrollment: 155 (2023-2024)
- Colors: Blue and White
- Mascot: Husky
- Website: https://www.cedarvalleychristianschool.org/

Cedar Valley Christian School (CVCS) is a private Christian school in Cedar Rapids, Iowa. It enrolls approximately 250 students and consists of grades Pre-kindergarten through Twelfth grade. The school is co-located with Cedar Valley Bible Church on Cottage Grove Ave just east of Indian Creek.

CVCS states that their purpose is to assist parents with their biblical responsibility to raise their children in the discipline and instruction of the Lord. It is the school's goal to provide fundamental subjects taught from a biblical viewpoint.

== History ==
CVCS was founded in 1974 under the direction of the elders of Cedar Valley Bible Church for use as a ministry of the church for students who attended or had parents who attended the church. The school started with only 34 students enrolled but has greatly expanded since. In 1978, a new wing was added and in 1987, a new gymnasium and set of classrooms was constructed. By 1993, the school included grades prekindergarten through 12th grade. As of 2015, with the financial support and participation of the church, Cedar Valley Christian School's student population has grown to about 210. CVCS has been state accredited after a rigorous self-study in 2014.

== Academics ==
CVCS offers education from Pre-Kindergarten through twelfth grade. There is much overlap between the junior high and high school, and teachers often teach more than one subject. For example, the junior high math teacher also teaches junior high science and high school algebra. The upper-level math teacher also teaches auto-mechanics.

AP classes available at Cedar Valley are available in literature and world history.

The school requires 44 credits to graduate from high school. A class that meets every day for one hour for the entire semester earns one credit. Therefore, a student must take an average of 5.5 hours/semester to graduate. Physical education is required unless a student obtains an academic or athletic waiver. These are obtained by either taking a requisite amount of credit hours (usually six or more) or by playing in a sport for that semester.

== Extracurricular activities ==
In athletics, the Huskies play against in-town teams in elementary and junior high school, sometimes traveling as far as North Liberty and Atkins. CVCS offers fifth and sixth grade volleyball, soccer, and boys and girls basketball. Junior high offers volleyball, wrestling, soccer, and basketball. The High School participates in the Iowa High School Athletic Association. The Huskies participate in the Tri-Rivers Conference in the following sports: volleyball, cheerleading (both competition and basketball), football, boys and girls soccer, boys and girls basketball and baseball. Athletes may also participate in bowling, cross country, tennis, and track & field with one of the three public high schools in Cedar Rapids.

CVCS offers extracurricular activities outside of athletics including drama and choir.

== Facilities ==
In 2008, a new addition was completed adding several classrooms. A new science lab, as well as various other classrooms and teacher prep space was added. Phase two of the project involves a new gym to be built on the north side of the property.

== Administration ==
The school is administrated by a principal, an assistant principal, and a school board. Authority over the school is maintained by the elders of Cedar Valley Bible Church.

== See also ==
- List of high schools in Iowa
