= Hobson Block =

- U.S. National Register of Historic Places
- U.S. Historic district – Contributing property
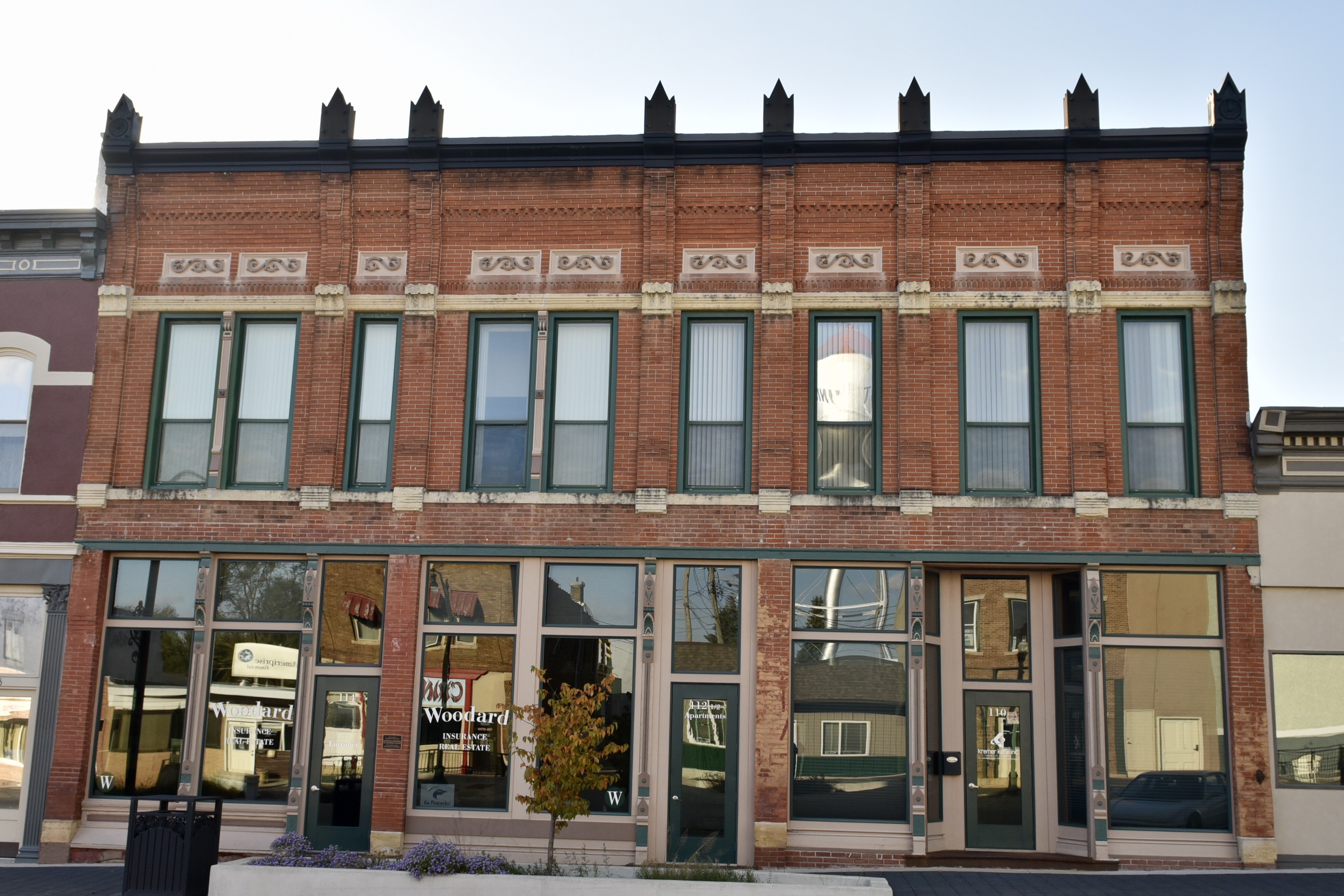

- Location within Iowa
- Location: 110–114 S. Vine St. West Union, Iowa
- Coordinates: 42°57′40″N 91°48′29″W
- Area: less than 1 acre
- Built: 1885
- Architect: Edward Easton
- Architectural style: Late Victorian
- Part of: West Union Commercial Historic District (ID15000191)
- MPS: Iowa's Main Street Commercial Architecture MPS
- NRHP reference No.: 08001042
- Added to NRHP: November 7, 2008

Hobson Block is a historic building in West Union, Iowa, United States. The brick and stone building was designed by local architect Edward Easton in the Late Victorian style to rebuild the town after its original wooden structures were destroyed by fire in May 1885. It was individually listed on the National Register of Historic Places in 2008. In 2015 it was included as a contributing property in the West Union Commercial Historic District.

== See also ==
- National Register of Historic Places listings in Fayette County, Iowa
