= Franklin Hotel (Strawberry Point, Iowa) =

- U.S. National Register of Historic Places
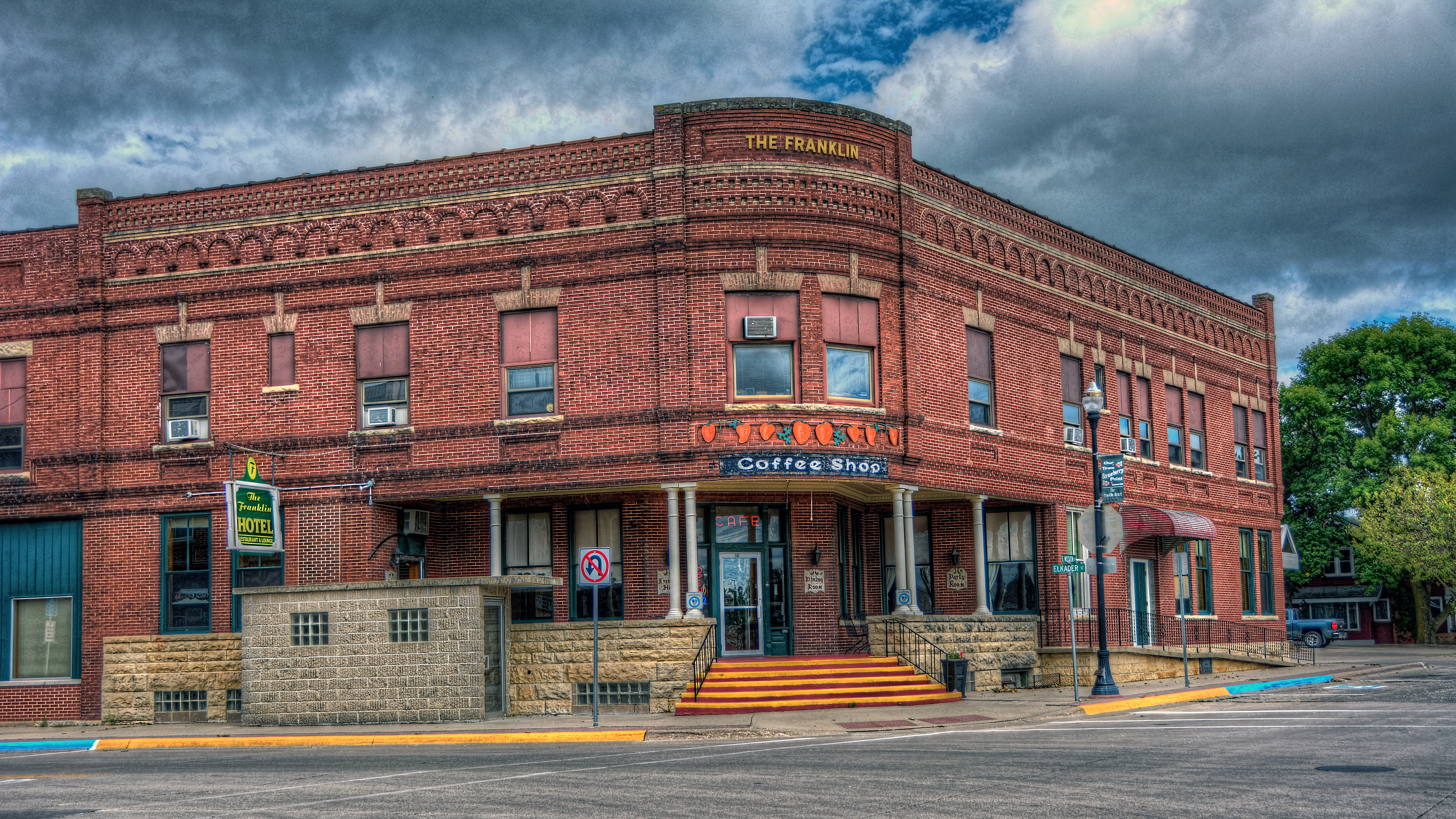

- Location within Iowa Location within the United States
- Location: 102 Elkader St. Strawberry Point, Iowa
- Coordinates: 42°41′01″N 91°32′02″W
- Built: 1902
- Built by: E.M. Loop
- Architect: Netcott and Donnan
- Architectural style: Classical Revival; Romanesque Revival
- NRHP reference No.: 99000740
- Added to NRHP: (unofficial) June 25, 1999. (Official) May 16, 2000

The Franklin Hotel is a historic building located in Strawberry Point, Iowa, United States. The Franklin Hotel and Land Company was established in 1902 for the purpose of building a modern hotel to serve the community. They hired the Independence, Iowa architectural firm of Netcott and Donnan to design the building, which was constructed by E. M. Loop of Hopkinton, Iowa and opened on February 12, 1903. It has operated as a hotel ever since. The two-story brick building combines the Neoclassical and Romanesque Revival styles. It sits on the northeast corner of the intersection of Elkader Street and Mission Street, and its rounded corner follows the curve of the intersection. The commercial space adjacent to the north is also a part of the building, with hotel rooms on the second floor. Railroad tracks at one time were located just north of the hotel, which served the passengers from the railroad and later travelers from the highways that run past the hotel. The building was listed on the National Register of Historic Places in 1999, for its significance as a landmark and reminder of Strawberry Point's history.
