= Delaware, Iowa =

- City
- Location of Delaware, Iowa
- Coordinates: 42°28′18″N 91°20′21″W
- Country: USA
- State: Iowa
- County: Delaware

Area
  - Total: 0.74 sq mi (1.92 km^{2})
  - Land: 0.73 sq mi (1.89 km^{2})
  - Water: 0.012 sq mi (0.03 km^{2})
- Elevation: 1,040 ft (320 m)

Population (2020)
  - Total: 142
  - Density: 194.6/sq mi (75.14/km^{2})
- Time zone: UTC-6 (Central (CST))
  - Summer (DST): UTC-5 (CDT)
- ZIP code: 52036
- Area code: 563
- FIPS code: 19-19630
- GNIS feature ID: 2394499
- Website: cityofdelawareia.org

Delaware is a city in Delaware County, Iowa, United States. The population was 142 at the time of the 2020 census.

== History ==
Delaware was platted in 1860, shortly after the Dubuque and Pacific Railroad was built through the neighborhood.

== Geography ==
According to the United States Census Bureau, the city has a total area of 0.81 square miles (2.10 km^{2}), of which 0.80 square miles (2.07 km^{2}) is land and 0.01 square miles (0.03 km^{2}) is water.

== Demographics ==
Historical populations
Year	Pop.	±%
1920	194	—
1930	165	−14.9%
1940	198	+20.0%
1950	192	−3.0%
1960	167	−13.0%
1970	153	−8.4%
1980	170	+11.1%
1990	176	+3.5%
2000	188	+6.8%
2010	159	−15.4%
2020	142	−10.7%
Source:"U.S. Census website". United States Census Bureau. and Iowa Data Center; Source: U.S. Decennial Census

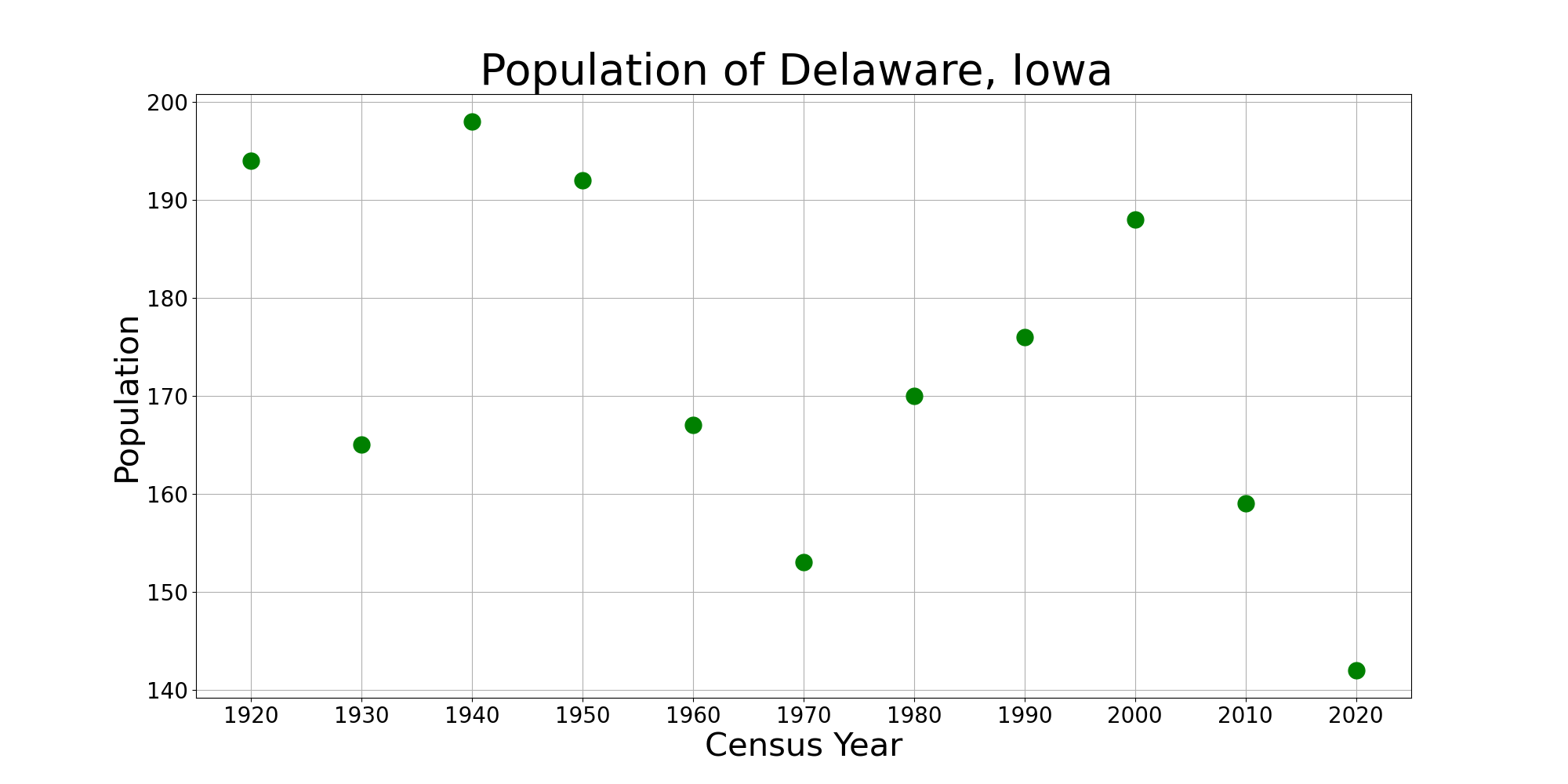
The population of Delaware, Iowa from US census data

=== 2020 census ===
As of the census of 2020, there were 142 people, 72 households, and 42 families residing in the city. The population density was 194.6 inhabitants per square mile (75.1/km^{2}). There were 72 housing units at an average density of 98.7 per square mile (38.1/km^{2}). The racial makeup of the city was 94.4% White, 0.0% Black or African American, 0.0% Native American, 0.0% Asian, 0.0% Pacific Islander, 1.4% from other races and 4.2% from two or more races. Hispanic or Latino persons of any race comprised 4.2% of the population.

Of the 72 households, 27.8% of which had children under the age of 18 living with them, 44.4% were married couples living together, 9.7% were cohabitating couples, 25.0% had a female householder with no spouse or partner present and 20.8% had a male householder with no spouse or partner present. 41.7% of all households were non-families. 34.7% of all households were made up of individuals, 13.9% had someone living alone who was 65 years old or older.

The median age in the city was 52.5 years. 14.8% of the residents were under the age of 20; 3.5% were between the ages of 20 and 24; 22.5% were from 25 and 44; 38.0% were from 45 and 64; and 21.1% were 65 years of age or older. The gender makeup of the city was 50.7% male and 49.3% female.

=== 2010 census ===
As of the census of 2010, there were 159 people, 82 households, and 41 families living in the city. The population density was 198.8 inhabitants per square mile (76.8/km^{2}). There were 85 housing units at an average density of 106.3 per square mile (41.0/km^{2}). The racial makeup of the city was 99.4% White and 0.6% from two or more races. Hispanic or Latino of any race were 0.6% of the population.

There were 82 households, of which 18.3% had children under the age of 18 living with them, 39.0% were married couples living together, 4.9% had a female householder with no husband present, 6.1% had a male householder with no wife present, and 50.0% were non-families. 40.2% of all households were made up of individuals, and 18.3% had someone living alone who was 65 years of age or older. The average household size was 1.94 and the average family size was 2.54.

The median age in the city was 48.7 years. 15.7% of residents were under the age of 18; 6.9% were between the ages of 18 and 24; 20.1% were from 25 to 44; 37.1% were from 45 to 64; and 20.1% were 65 years of age or older. The gender makeup of the city was 54.7% male and 45.3% female.

=== 2000 census ===
As of the census of 2000, there were 188 people, 78 households, and 51 families living in the city. The population density was 235.4 inhabitants per square mile (90.9/km^{2}). There were 78 housing units at an average density of 97.7 per square mile (37.7/km^{2}). The racial makeup of the city was 98.94% White, and 1.06% from two or more races. Hispanic or Latino of any race were 1.06% of the population.

There were 78 households, out of which 32.1% had children under the age of 18 living with them, 51.3% were married couples living together, 11.5% had a female householder with no husband present, and 34.6% were non-families. 26.9% of all households were made up of individuals, and 11.5% had someone living alone who was 65 years of age or older. The average household size was 2.41 and the average family size was 2.82.

In the city, the population was spread out, with 29.3% under the age of 18, 5.9% from 18 to 24, 31.9% from 25 to 44, 22.3% from 45 to 64, and 10.6% who were 65 years of age or older. The median age was 35 years. For every 100 females, there were 100.0 males. For every 100 females age 18 and over, there were 98.5 males.

The median income for a household in the city was $36,875, and the median income for a family was $40,694. Males had a median income of $31,250 versus $21,875 for females. The per capita income for the city was $18,361. None of the families and 4.4% of the population were living below the poverty line, including no under eighteens and 16.7% of those over 64.

== Education ==
The Maquoketa Valley Community School District operates local area public schools.
