= August Nus Polygonal Barn =

- U.S. National Register of Historic Places
- Location within Iowa Location within the United States
- Location: County Road C2W
- Nearest city: Arlington, Iowa
- Coordinates: 42°45′35″N 91°38′23″W
- Area: less than one acre
- Built: 1906
- MPS: Iowa Round Barns: The Sixty Year Experiment TR
- NRHP reference No.: 86001427
- Added to NRHP: June 30, 1986

August Nus Polygonal Barn is a historic building located east of Arlington, Iowa, United States. Built in 1906, this was one of four flat roofed barns that were known to exist in Iowa, and it was the oldest of the four. The 12-sided structure with horizontal wood siding was built around a central silo that extends above the barn. Eventually, it had a cone shaped roof. The barn is 60-foot (18 m) in diameter, and the silo is 14 feet (4.3 m) in diameter. The barn was listed on the National Register of Historic Places in 1986.
