= North Linn Community School District =

Public school district in Troy Mills, Iowa, United States

Coordinates: 42.290862°N 91.661366°W

Location
- Troy Mills, Iowa Linn, Buchanan, Delaware, and Benton counties United States
- Coordinates: 42.290862, -91.661366

District information
- Type: Local school district
- Grades: K-12
- Established: 1966
- Superintendent: Dave Hoeger
- Schools: 3
- Budget: $9,282,000 (2020-21)
- NCES District ID: 1920820

Students and staff
- Students: 535 (2022-23)
- Teachers: 41.86 FTE
- Staff: 44.60 FTE
- Student–teacher ratio: 12.78
- Athletic conference: Tri-Rivers
- District mascot: Lynx
- Colors: Burgundy and White

Other information
- Website: www.northlinncsd.org

The North Linn Community School District is a rural public school district headquartered in Troy Mills, Iowa (the mailing address and physical location is outside of Troy Mills, though the street address is Coggon).

The district spans northern Linn County, southern Buchanan County, southwestern Delaware County, and a small area of northeastern Benton County. It serves the unincorporated town of Troy Mills, the towns of Coggon, Walker, and the surrounding rural areas.

The school mascot is the Lynx, and their colors are burgundy and white.

The district hired Dave Hoeger as superintendent in April 2020, replacing the retiring Doug Tuetken. He will also replace Tuetken as the shared superintendent with Maquoketa Valley.

== Schools ==
The district operates three schools in one facility outside of Troy Mills:

- North Linn Elementary School
- North Linn Middle School
- North Linn Senior High School

=== North Linn Senior High School ===
==== Athletics ====
The Lynx participate in the Tri-Rivers Conference in the following sports:

- Football
- Cross Country
  - Girls' 1999 Class 1A State Champions
- Volleyball
- Basketball
  - Boys' 2-time Class 1A State Champions (2022, 2024)
- Wrestling
- Golf
- Track and Field
  - Girls' 2-time Class 1A State Champions (2004, 2005)
- Baseball
- Softball

== See also ==
- List of school districts in Iowa
- List of high schools in Iowa
