= Boggs Lumber and Hardware Building =

- U.S. National Register of Historic Places
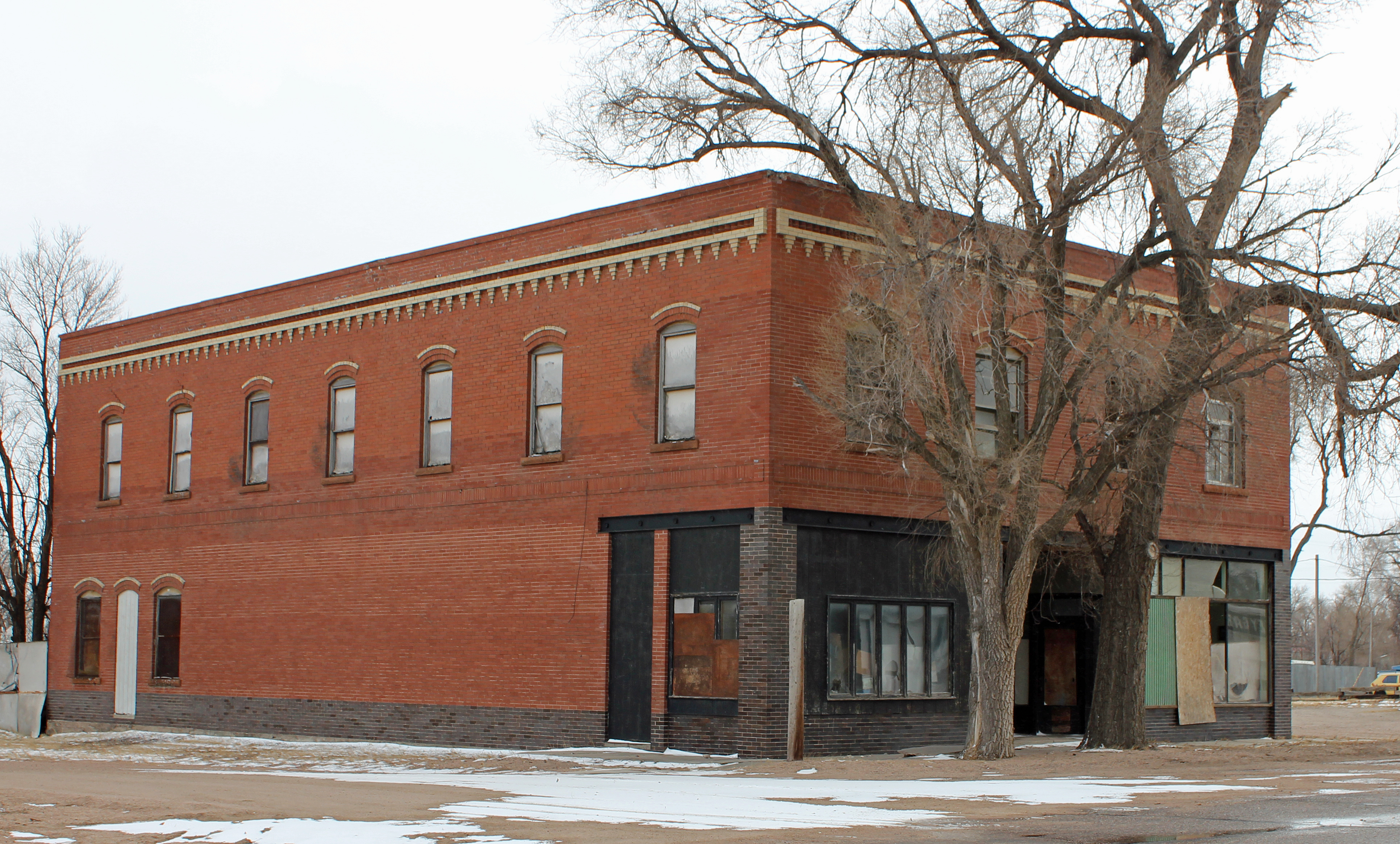

- Location within Colorado
- Location: 125 N. Main St., Eckley, Colorado
- Coordinates: 40°6′48″N 102°29′18″W
- Area: 0.5 acres (0.20 ha)
- Built: 1915
- NRHP reference No.: 85000086
- Added to NRHP: January 18, 1985

The Boggs Lumber and Hardware Building, also known as the Eckley Grange Hall, is a historic building at 125 N. Main St. in Eckley, Colorado. Built in 1915, it was listed on the National Register of Historic Places in 1985.

It was the first of five brick buildings in Eckley built in the 20th century and is the oldest surviving commercial building in the town.
