= Starmont High School =

Public secondary school in Fayette County, Iowa, United States

Coordinates: 42.689°N 91.648°W

Location
- 3202 40th St; Arlington, Iowa 50606; USA

Information
- Type: Public
- Principal: Jennifer Lange
- Teaching staff: 17.97 (FTE)
- Grades: 9-12
- Enrollment: 181 (2023-2024)
- Student to teacher ratio: 10.07
- Colors: Black and Gold
- Athletics conference: Tri-Rivers Conference
- Mascot: Star
- Website: www.starmont.k12.ia.us

Starmont High School is a rural public high school, part of the Starmont Community School District, located 5 miles south of Arlington, Iowa, six miles north of Lamont, Iowa, and six miles west of Strawberry Point, Iowa on a very large tract of land in an area locally known as Maryville, at the intersection of Highway 187 and Highway 3.

The name is a portmanteau initialism: Strawberry Point + Arlington + Lamont, thus Starmont.

== Athletics ==
The Stars compete in the Tri-Rivers Conference in the following sports:

- Cross Country
- Volleyball
- Football
- Basketball
- Wrestling
- Track and Field
  - Boys' 2005 Class 2A State Champions
  - Girls' 1982 Class 2A State Champions
- Golf
- Baseball
- Softball

== See also ==
- List of school districts in Iowa
- List of high schools in Iowa
