= Maquoketa Valley Community School District =

Public school district in Delhi, Iowa, United States

Coordinates: 42.426194°N 91.329407°W

Maquoketa Valley School District
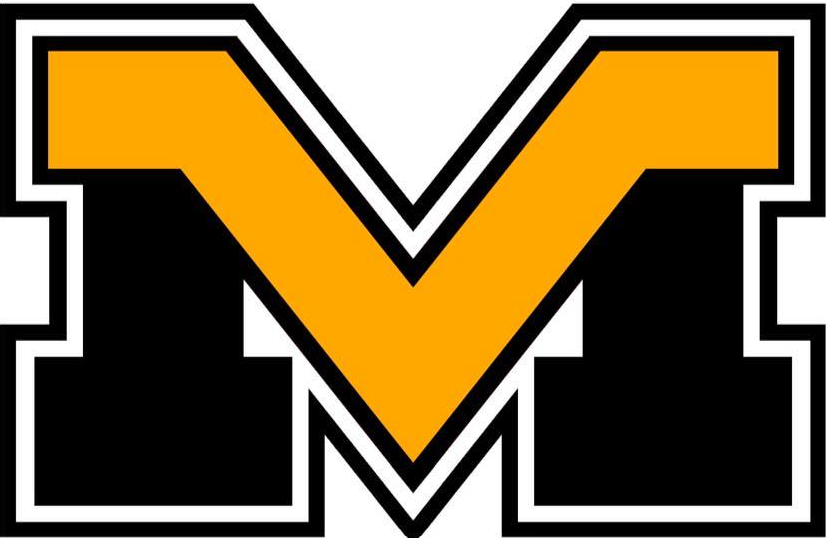

Location
- Delhi, Iowa Delaware County United States
- Coordinates: 42.426194, -91.329407

District information
- Type: Local school district
- Grades: K-12
- Superintendent: Dave Hoeger
- Schools: 5
- Budget: $10,260,000 (2020-21)
- NCES District ID: 1918540

Students and staff
- Students: 705 (2022-23)
- Teachers: 50.72 FTE
- Staff: 54.43 FTE
- Student–teacher ratio: 13.90
- Athletic conference: Tri-Rivers
- District mascot: Wildcats
- Colors: Black and Gold

Other information
- Website: www.maquoketa-v.k12.ia.us

Maquoketa Valley Community School District is a rural public school district headquartered in Delhi, Iowa. The district is completely within Delaware County, and serves Delhi, Delaware, Earlville, Hopkinton, and the surrounding rural areas. The school mascot is the Wildcats, and their colors are black and gold.

The district hired Dave Hoeger as superintendent in April 2020, replacing the retiring Doug Tuetken. He will also replace Tuetken as the shared superintendent with North Linn.

== Schools ==
The district operates five schools:

- Delhi Elementary School, Delhi
- Earlville Elementary School, Earlville
- Johnston Elementary School, Hopkinton
- Maquoketa Valley Middle School, Delhi
- Maquoketa Valley High School, Delhi

=== Maquoketa Valley High School ===
==== Athletics ====
The Wildcats participate in the Tri-Rivers Conference in the following sports:

- Football
- Cross Country
  - Girls' 1988 Class 1A State Champions
- Volleyball
- Basketball
- Wrestling
- Golf
- Track and Field
- Baseball
- Softball

== See also ==
- List of school districts in Iowa
- List of high schools in Iowa
