= Katrina Mealey =

American veterinary pharmacologist

- Born: New Mexico, USA
- Spouse: Robert Mealey (m. 1987)

Academic background
- Education: BS, 1986, University of New Mexico; DVM, 1990, Colorado State University; PhD, 1998, Texas A&M University
- Thesis: Novel mechanisms for MDR induction and modulation (1998)

Katrina Ann Mealey (nee Larson) is an American veterinary pharmacologist. She is a Regents Professor and Richard L. Ott Endowed Chair in Small Animal Medicine and Research at Washington State University.

== Early life and education ==
Mealey was born and raised in New Mexico to parents Maria Gonzales and Wayne R. Larson. She completed her Bachelor of Science degree at the University of New Mexico before marrying her husband, Robert Mealey, and enrolling together at Colorado State University for their DVM. Following her DVM, Mealey completed two internships and a residency before completing her PhD at Texas A&M University in 1998.

== Career ==
Following her PhD, Mealey accepted a faculty position at Washington State University (WSU). While leading a group of WSU researchers, she discovered that a gene mutation called MDR1 predisposed herding dogs—collies to react violently to a deworming pill. Based on this discovery, Mealey developed a clinical test for the mutation based on blood samples and cheek swabs from at least 25 unrelated dogs of every one of the 150-plus breeds. While conducting this trial, she also filed for her first US Patent for her diagnostic test. As a result of her research, Mealey was one of the recipients of the 2012 Pfizer Animal Health Award for Research Excellence.

Based on her clinical trials, Mealey established the first veterinary-based dedicated research effort towards individualized medicine in animals in 2013. Her work on identifying why certain dog breeds suffer deadly drug reactions led her to receive a 2013 Women to Watch in Life Science Award from the Washington Biotechnology and Biomedical Association. She was later recognized in 2016 with an election to the National Academy of Inventors for her invention of a genetic test that detects the MDR-1 mutation. Mealey also received the 2019 Lloyd E. Davis Award in recognition of her "outstanding achievements in research, teaching, and professional service in veterinary pharmacology."

In July 2020, Mealey was elected to the Washington State Academy of Sciences for her expertise in pharmacogenetics that has benefited veterinary medicine both locally and worldwide. She then earned funding to support technology to allow for her research team to predetermine whether a drug would cause issues for dogs and cats with the gene mutation. While conducting her research, Mealey also partook in the national Promotion and Tenure, Innovation and Entrepreneurship Coalition where she advocated for more value to be placed on innovation, entrepreneurship and other forms of scholarly impact.

In January 2022, Mealey was recognized with an election to the American Association for the Advancement of Science for her contributions to research and leadership in the areas of food labeling, food quality, and product reputation. Following this, Mealey and her research team in the Program in Individualized Medicine at WSU developed a test to detect the MDR1 mutation in cats.

== Personal life ==
During her off-time, Mealey is an avid runner. She ran in the 2013 Boston Marathon, where she finished with a time of 3:49:41.
