= Eckley, Colorado =

Statutory town in Yuma County, Colorado, United States

- statutory town
- Town of Eckley
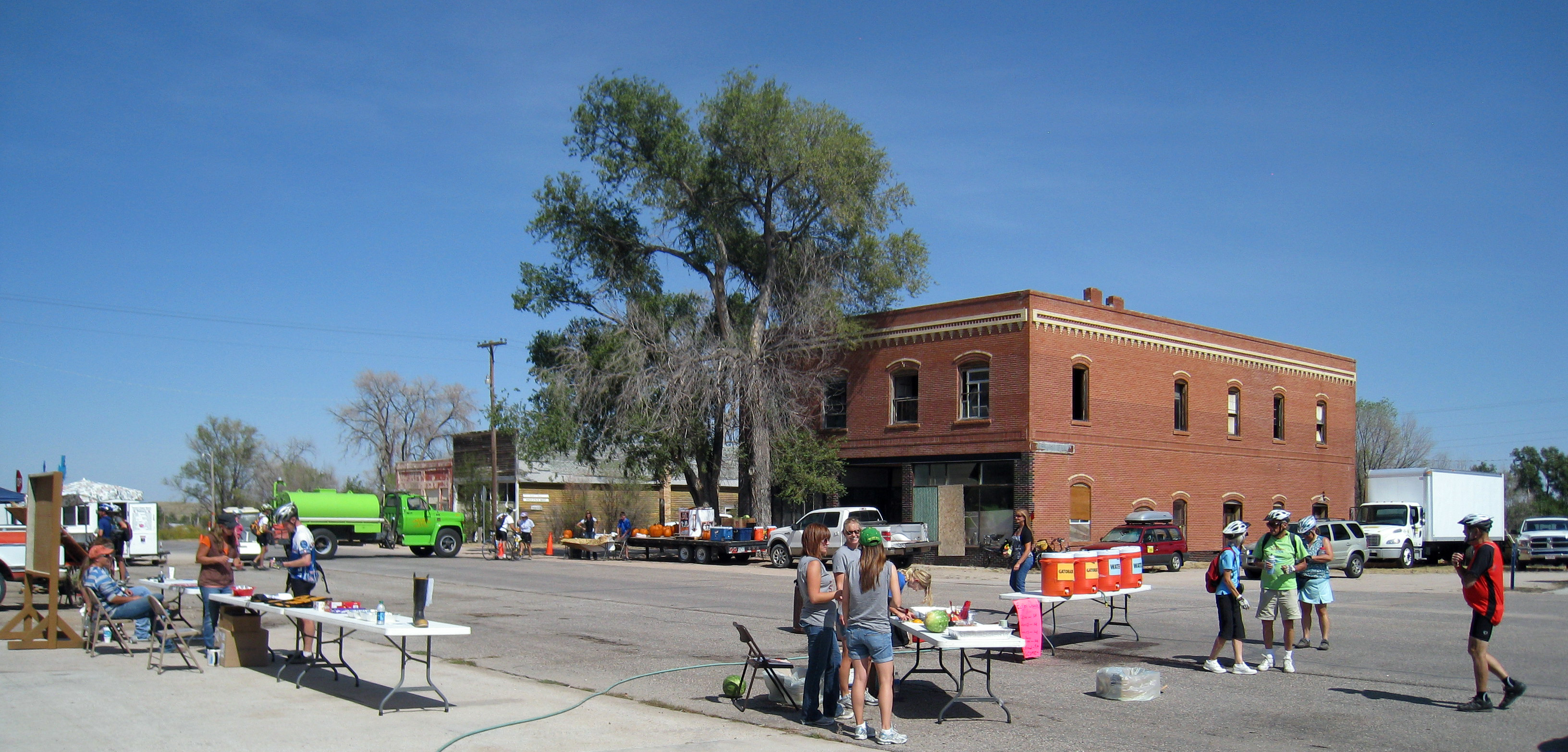
- "Pedal the Plains" event (2012)

- Location within Yuma County and Colorado
- Coordinates: 40°06′45″N 102°29′18″W
- Country: United States
- State: Colorado
- County: Yuma
- Incorporated: June 16, 1920
- Named for: Adam Eckles

Government
  - Type: statutory town

Area
  - Total: 0.473 sq mi (1.225 km^{2})
  - Land: 0.473 sq mi (1.225 km^{2})
  - Water: 0 sq mi (0.000 km^{2})
- Elevation: 3,895 ft (1,187 m)

Population (2020)
  - Total: 232
  - Density: 491/sq mi (189/km^{2})
- Time zone: UTC−07:00 (MST)
  - Summer (DST): UTC−06:00 (MDT)
- ZIP code: 80727
- Area codes: 970/748
- GNIS town ID: 2412464
- FIPS code: 08-23025
- Website: townofeckley.colorado.gov

Eckley is a statutory town located in Yuma County, Colorado, United States. The town population was 232 at the 2020 United States census.

== History ==
The Eckley, Colorado, post office opened on November 15, 1883. The community derives its name from Adam Eckles, a rancher.

== Geography ==
At the 2020 United States census, the town had a total area of 303 acres (1.225 km^{2}), all of it land.

=== Climate ===
According to the Köppen Climate Classification system, Eckley has a semi-arid climate, abbreviated "BSk" on climate maps.

== Demographics ==
Historical population
Census	Pop.	Note	%±
1920	332		—
1930	359		8.1%
1940	358		−0.3%
1950	295		−17.6%
1960	207		−29.8%
1970	193		−6.8%
1980	262		35.8%
1990	211		−19.5%
2000	278		31.8%
2010	257		−7.6%
2020	232		−9.7%
U.S. Decennial Census

As of the census of 2000, there were 278 people, 100 households, and 66 families residing in the town. The population density was 591.7 inhabitants per square mile (228.5/km^{2}). There were 120 housing units at an average density of 255.4 per square mile (98.6/km^{2}). The racial makeup of the town was 85.25% White, 0.36% African American, 1.80% Native American, 10.79% from other races, and 1.80% from two or more races. Hispanic or Latino of any race were 19.42% of the population.

There were 100 households, out of which 45.0% had children under the age of 18 living with them, 54.0% were married couples living together, 9.0% had a female householder with no husband present, and 34.0% were non-families. 30.0% of all households were made up of individuals, and 13.0% had someone living alone who was 65 years of age or older. The average household size was 2.78 and the average family size was 3.53.

In the town, the population was spread out, with 37.1% under the age of 18, 5.0% from 18 to 24, 29.1% from 25 to 44, 16.9% from 45 to 64, and 11.9% who were 65 years of age or older. The median age was 32 years. For every 100 females, there were 98.6 males. For every 100 females age 18 and over, there were 94.4 males.

The median income for a household in the town was $23,500, and the median income for a family was $26,250. Males had a median income of $27,500 versus $14,375 for females. The per capita income for the town was $11,194. About 17.8% of families and 20.5% of the population were below the poverty line, including 29.9% of those under the age of eighteen and none of those 65 or over.

== See also ==
- List of populated places in Colorado
