= Fayette County Courthouse (Iowa) =

- U.S. National Register of Historic Places
- U.S. Historic district – Contributing property
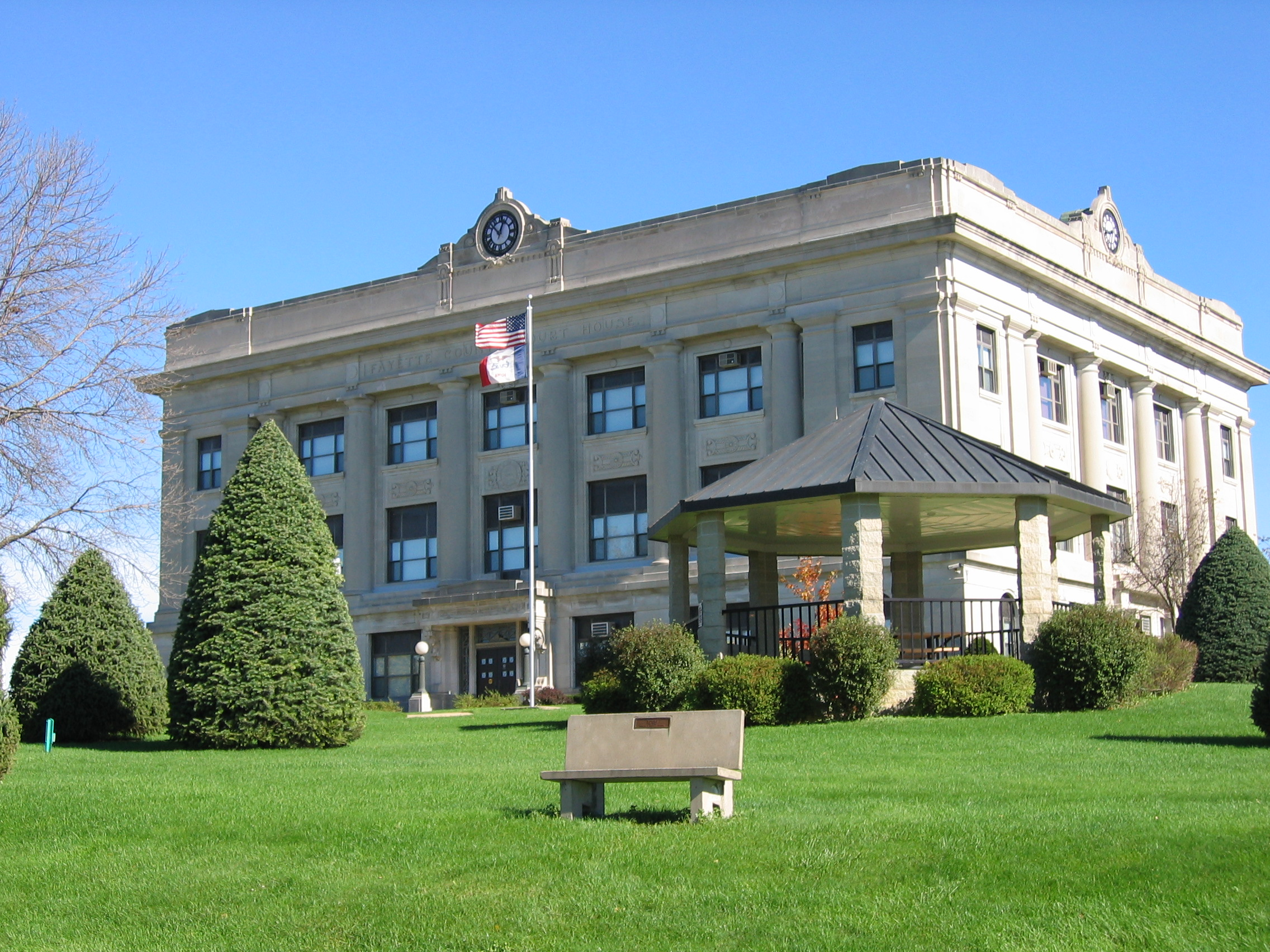

- Location within Iowa Location within the United States
- Location: 114 North Pine Street; West Union, Iowa
- Coordinates: 42°57′38″N 91°48′21″W
- Area: less than one acre
- Built: 1923
- Architect: J.G. Ralston
- Architectural style: Beaux-Arts
- Part of: West Union Commercial Historic District (ID15000191)
- MPS: County Courthouses in Iowa TR
- NRHP reference No.: 81000236
- Added to NRHP: July 2, 1981

The Fayette County Courthouse in West Union, Iowa, United States was built in 1923. It was listed on the National Register of Historic Places in 1981 as a part of the County Courthouses in Iowa Thematic Resource. In 2015 it was included as a contributing property in the West Union Commercial Historic District. The current courthouse is the third facility to house court functions and county administration.

== History ==
West Union was named the county seat of Fayette County when it was established, but opposition to its being the county seat prevented a courthouse from being constructed. The opposition came mainly from people in the south, while centrally located Fayette offered to build a courthouse for the county there. With that in mind, the citizens of West Union offered to contribute $3,000 toward the construction of a courthouse in their town. A two-story brick building measuring 40 by 60 feet (12 m × 18 m) was built in West Union in 1857 for $8,000. County citizens refused to build a jail, however, and a section of the northwest corner of the courthouse was fashioned for that purpose. A prisoner in the jail facilities set fire to the structure as he escaped in 1872. While the building was destroyed, most of the records were saved.

As the county seat controversy rose again, businessmen from West Union offered to rebuild the courthouse contingent on the county appropriating $5,000 for the project and their ability to salvage whatever was useful from the destroyed courthouse. The second courthouse was completed in 1874 based on the businessmen's offer. However, the building was built too small, and growth in the county led to a succession of additions and improvements between 1894 and 1896. On February 5, 1922, this courthouse was also destroyed in a fire and work began quickly to replace it.

Waterloo, Iowa architect John G. Ralston was contracted to design the present courthouse. The cornerstone was laid June 21, 1923, and it was dedicated October 8, 1924. Its final construction costs amounted to $299,000. Its significance is derived from its association with county government, and the political power and prestige of West Union as the county seat.

== Architecture ==
The building was designed in a simplified Beaux-Arts style. It is three stories tall with an exterior that is faced with Bedford Stone. The base of the building is composed of granite. Large pilasters separate window bays on the second and third stories and the building is accessed through solid bronze doors. The interior features a domed skylight, extensive use of marble, plaster cornices, brass railings, and ceramic tile floors. The walls of the courtroom feature strips of wood that are applied in angular patterns. At its opening, the building housed a room displaying memorabilia from the Grand Army of the Republic.
