= Lipsett Hardware Building =

- U.S. National Register of Historic Places
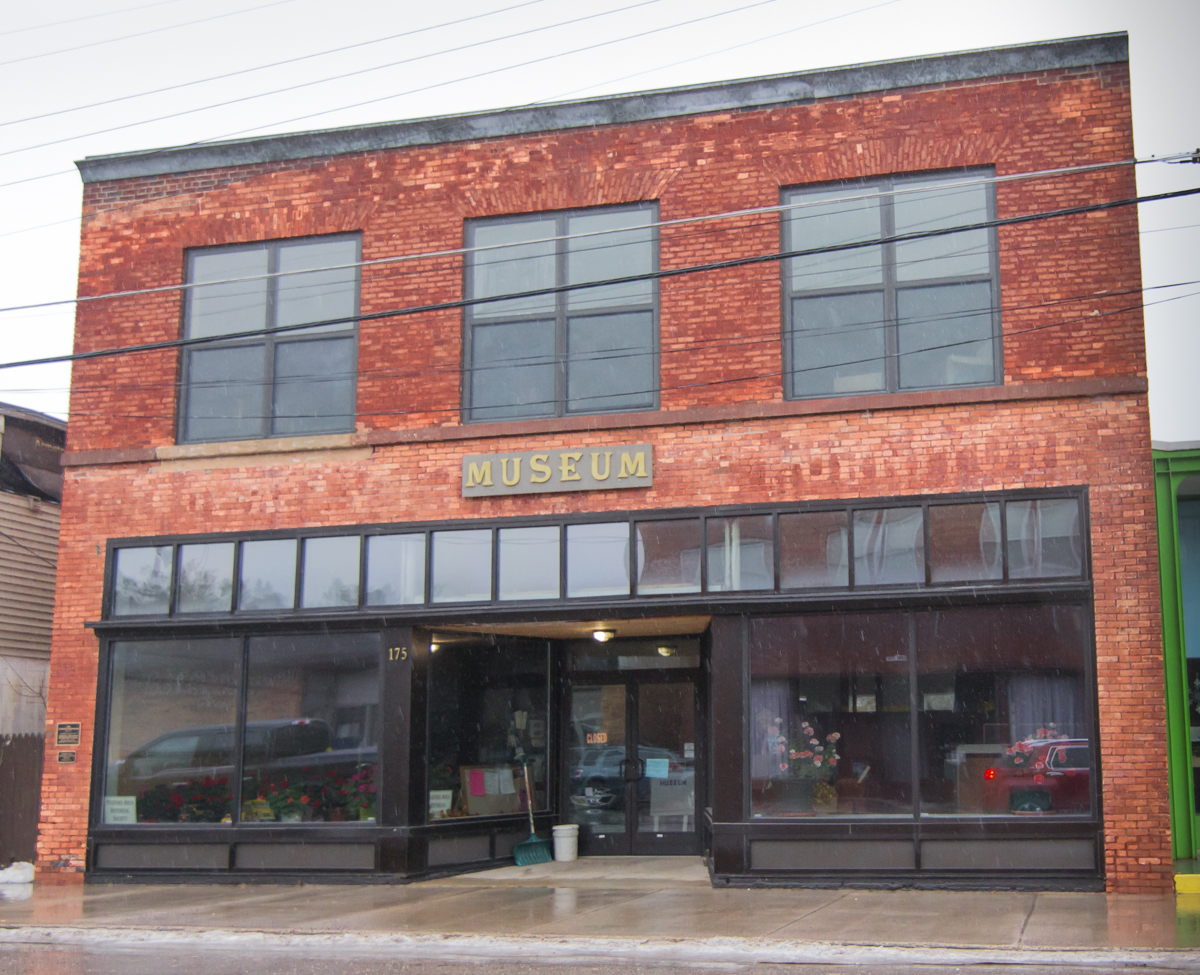

- Location within Michigan Location within the United States
- Interactive map
- Location: 175 Main St., Pickford, Michigan
- Coordinates: 46°9′29″N 84°21′40″W
- Built: 1912
- Built by: John B. Irwin
- NRHP reference No.: 12001171
- Added to NRHP: January 14, 2013

The Lipsett Hardware Building, currently the Pickford Area Historical Society Museum, is a commercial building located at 175 Main Street in Pickford, Michigan. It was listed on the National Register of Historic Places in 2013.

== History ==
The first resident in the Pickford area was Charles W. Pickford, who established a farm on the site of the village in 1877. His brother Thomas founded the first store in the area in 1880, and the population grew to over 100 during the next decade, to a peak of 500 people in 1903. However, it was only in 1899 that the village of Pickford was formally platted, and the small downtown gained a number of commercial buildings during the first decade of the 1900s.

James L. Lipsitt arrived in Sault Ste. Marie, Michigan from Ontario in 1875. He worked as a blacksmith for a number of years, but also ran a livery stable, a farm machinery business, and a contracting business (with which he built a number of buildings at Fort Brady). He was also president of a local bank, and served as the mayor of Sault Ste. Marie.

Lipsett opened a branch of his farm implement and hardware business in Pickford at some point in the early 1900s, and by 1911 was making plans to construct a new building to house it. He hired John B. Irwin of Sault Ste. Marie to construct the new building, and it was completed in August 1912.

James Lipsitt's son Verne L. Lipsitt managed the hardware store, and also ran a Ford dealership in the building from 1912 until 1917, when a separate building was constructed for the dealership. Verne assumed ownership of the store in the mid-1920s, and Lipsett Hardware remained in the building until 1953, when Verne sold the business to Harvey R. and Margaret Blair and Lewis H. and Etta Marie Harrison. The business continued as "Lipsett Hardware" until 1960, when Harrison bought out his partner and changed the name to "Harrison Hardware." The Harrisons ran the store until 1979, when they sold it to Clifford R. Waybrant, who ran the hardware store for three more years until it closed in 1982. The building was remodeled, and held several shops over the years as Waybrant rented out the space to different businesses. In 1991, Waybrant sold the building, and it remained vacant for a decade.

In 2001, the Pickford Area Historical Society bought the building. Major restoration was carried out over the next few years, culminating with the installation of a replica cornice in 2011. The Society moved into the building in 2006. As of 2013, the Pickford Area Historical Society still occupies the building.

== Description ==
The Lipsett Hardware Store is a two-story brick building with a flat timber roof, sitting on a concrete foundation measuring 40 feet (12 m) by 100 feet (30 m). The grade slopes downward to the rear, so that an entrance directly into the basement level is cut into the rear face of the building. Small arch-topped basement windows along the top of the foundation line the rear and side walls. No other windows line the side, but the rear contains four single windows on the first floor and three pairs on the second.

The front facade is symmetrical, featuring a slant-sided recessed entryway with the door at grade level. The entryway is flanked by heavy piers, with large glass store windows to each side and three paired windows on the second floor. A brick beltcourse runs above the entrance and serves as the sills for the upper-story windows. A metal cornice runs across the top. The present facade dates from 2004-2005, when extensive restoration work was done to restore the building to its original appearance.

Inside, the first floor is one large space, and the ceiling is finished with an elaborate pressed tin ceiling original to the building. The tin has a slight cove around the edges and central support beam. A staircase in the rear provides access to the second floor. The second floor is a single space, all unfinished, which provides a view of the timber roof above.
