= Maynard Town Hall and Jail =

- U.S. National Register of Historic Places
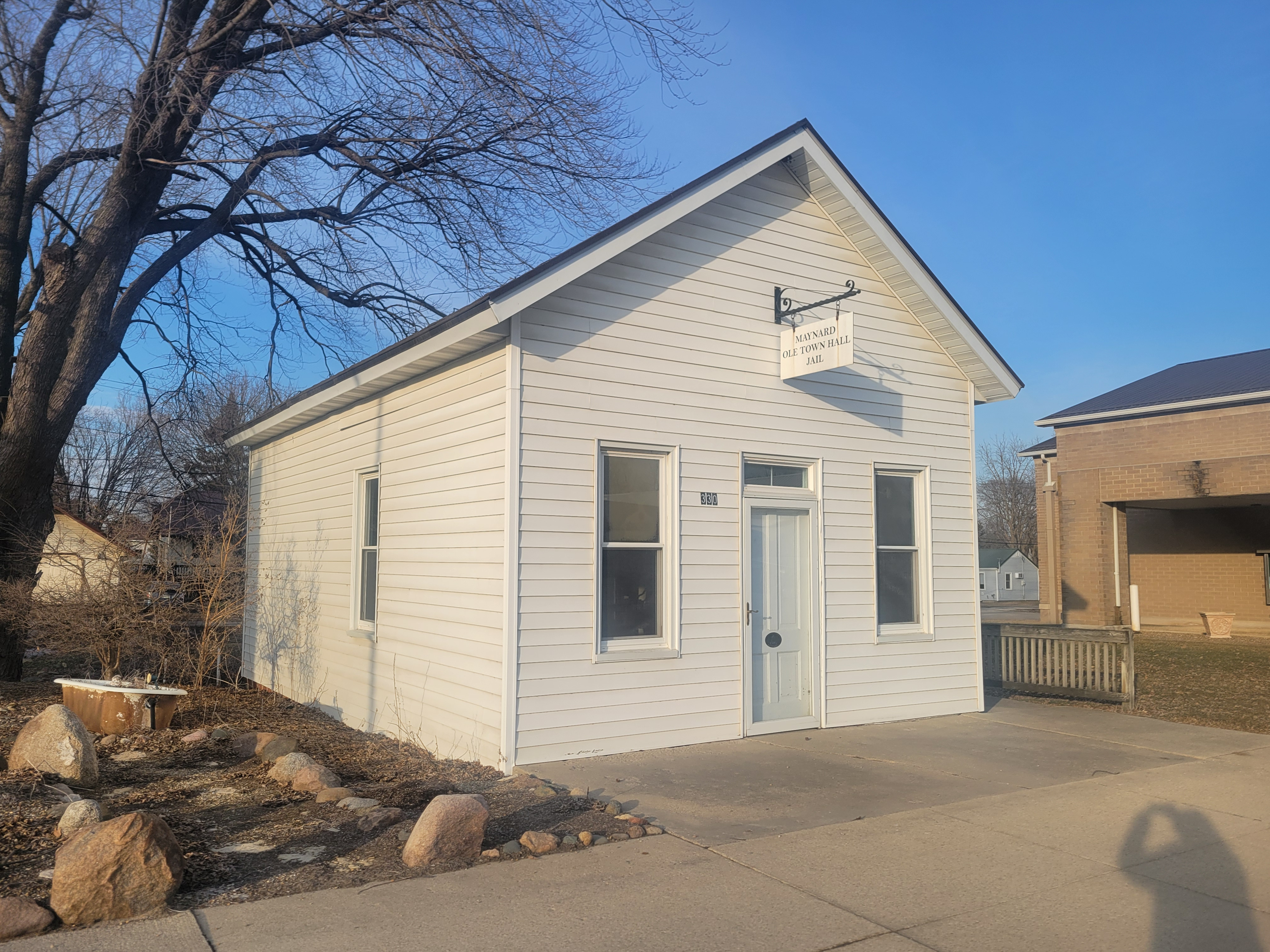
- Maynard Town Hall and Jail in 2026

- Location within Iowa Location within the United States
- Location: 330 Main St., W. Maynard, Iowa
- Coordinates: 42°46′26.4″N 91°52′50.7″W
- Area: less than one acre
- Built: 1894
- NRHP reference No.: 97001286
- Added to NRHP: October 30, 1997

Maynard Town Hall and Jail is a historic building located in Maynard, Iowa, United States. Before this building was constructed the town had no building to enact its business. They used the mayor's house or place of business for his office and council meetings. After it was completed, this building served as a jail into the late 1930s and as the city hall until 1952, when a new community building was completed. For most of the time it served as a jail it was outfitted with bars and had bunks. It was a short-term lock-up for those who committed minor infractions. It was used for a public library beginning in the 1940s. After its use as a city hall, it was bought by a local merchant for use in his grocery store in 1957. The building was listed on the National Register of Historic Places in 1997.
