= The Elgin Block =

- U.S. National Register of Historic Places
- Location within Iowa Location within the United States
- Location: 225-231 Center St. Elgin, Iowa
- Coordinates: 42°57′26″N 91°37′46″W
- Area: less than one acre
- Built: 1872
- Built by: Lewis Thoma; Henry and August Holser
- Architectural style: Italianate
- NRHP reference No.: 08000374
- Added to NRHP: May 8, 2008

The Elgin Block is a historic building located in Elgin, Iowa, United States. Completed in 1872, this two- and three-story Italianate-style brick structure features four storefronts. It was the first major brick building in Elgin, and saved the town after the Burlington, Cedar Rapids and Minneapolis Railroad placed their depot in the adjoining village of Lutra the same year. Lutra eventually became a part of Elgin. While a single building, it is divided into four parts that were owned separately. Retail businesses were located on the first floor across the block. Apartments were located on the second floors of 225 and 227. The third floor of 227 housed an Independent Order of Odd Fellows lodge, the International Association of Rebekah Assemblies, and the Order of the Eastern Star. It is the only section with three floors. The second floor of 229 and 231 housed a concert hall. The building was listed on the National Register of Historic Places in 2008.
