= Maple View, West Virginia =

- Unincorporated community
- Location within the state of West Virginia Maple View, West Virginia (the United States)
- Coordinates: 37°17′54″N 81°09′43″W
- Country: United States
- State: West Virginia
- County: Mercer
- Elevation: 2,464 ft (751 m)
- Time zone: UTC-5 (Eastern (EST))
  - Summer (DST): UTC-4 (EDT)
- Area codes: 304 & 681
- GNIS feature ID: 1555043

Maple View is an unincorporated community in Mercer County, West Virginia, United States. Maple View is 4 miles (6.4 km) northeast of Bluefield.
