= West Union Commercial Historic District =

Historic district in Iowa, United States

- U.S. National Register of Historic Places
- U.S. Historic district
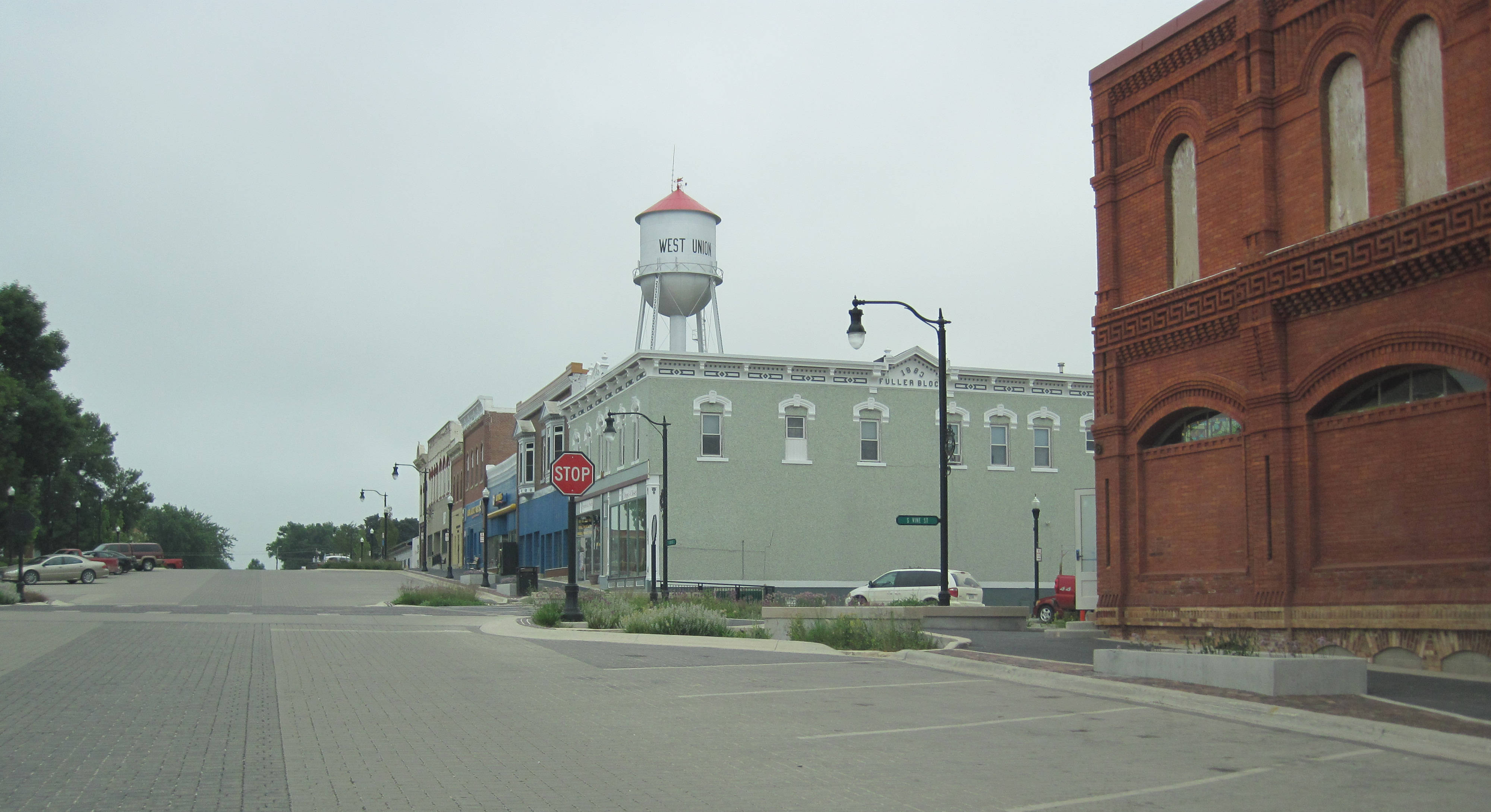

- Location within Iowa Location within the United States
- Location: Roughly bounded by N. and S. Vine, Main, Walnut, and Plum Streets, West Union, Iowa
- Coordinates: 42°57′41″N 91°48′26″W
- Area: 17 acres (6.9 ha)
- Architectural style: Late Victorian; Late 19th and 20th Century Revivals
- NRHP reference No.: 15000191
- Added to NRHP: May 4, 2015

The West Union Commercial Historic District is a nationally recognized historic district located in West Union, Iowa, United States. It was listed on the National Register of Historic Places in 2015. At the time of its nomination the district consisted of 56 resources, including 38 contributing buildings, one contributing structure, and 17 noncontributing buildings. West Union was platted in 1850 and retail businesses began the same year around the public square. The square also served as the center for county government and as a place for many of the community's social activities. The wide streets and sidewalks in the central business district also facilitated the city's commercial and social life. The buildings in the district have housed various commercial businesses, government operations, and churches. The residential buildings are mostly associated with the churches. Most of the buildings are one and two-stories in height, although a couple are three-stories, and built of brick. Most of them are in the revival styles built in the Victorian era, including Italianate, Queen Anne, Neoclassical, and Colonial Revival. There are also buildings designed in the Commercial style. Several buildings were designed by architects, but for the most part the designers are unknown. The city's water tower is the contributing structure. The First Baptist Church (1867), Hobson Block (1885), Maple View Sanitarium (1903), and the Fayette County Courthouse (1923) are all individually listed on the National Register of Historic Places.
