= First Baptist Church of West Union =

- U.S. National Register of Historic Places
- U.S. Historic district – Contributing property
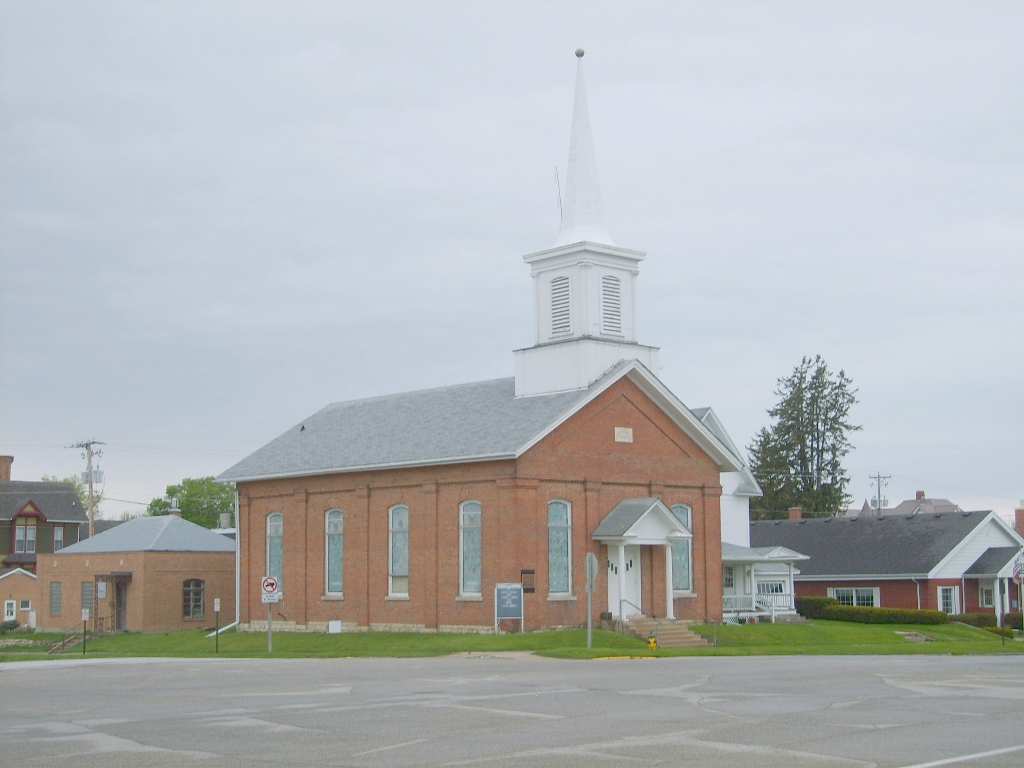

- Location within Iowa Location within the United States
- Location: Main And Vine Sts., West Union, Iowa
- Coordinates: 42°57′46.2″N 91°48′30.9″W
- Area: less than one acre
- Built: 1867, 1906, 1911
- Built by: Crosby, Ezra
- Architectural style: Greek Revival
- Part of: West Union Commercial Historic District (ID15000191)
- NRHP reference No.: 99001240
- Added to NRHP: October 7, 1999

First Baptist Church of West Union, also known as Regular Baptist Church, is a historic building and active church located in West Union, Iowa, United States.

It was built in Greek Revival style in 1867 by brickmason Ezra Crosby. Stained glass windows were installed in 1906. One of the church's galleries and a baptistry were added in 1911 during repairs after a fire.

It was individually on the National Register of Historic Places in 1999. In 2015 it was included as a contributing property in the West Union Commercial Historic District.
