= Brian Mealey =

American periodontist

Brian Mealey is an American periodontist.

== Education ==
Mealey graduated from Texas A&M College Station with a degree in zoology. He then attended the UT Health San Antonio School of Dentistry, graduating in 1983. He then completed a general practice residency at the U.S. Air Force Hospital, Barksdale Air Force Base, Louisiana. He returned to San Antonio to receive his master's degree in 1990. He also received his certificate in periodontics in 1990 from Wilford Hall Ambulatory Surgical Center at Lackland Air Force Base in San Antonio, Texas.

As a postgraduate periodontal resident, Mealey won the prestigious 1989 Balint Orban Memorial Program Competition.

== Career ==
Mealey is currently the chairman of the postgraduate periodontal program at UT Health San Antonio School of Dentistry. He served as director of the American Board of Periodontology for the 2016 cycle and is board-certified by the same board.

Mealey has been awarded the following awards:

- 1998 R. Earl Robinson Regeneration Award for the year's most outstanding scientific published article on periodontal regeneration in the basic or clinical sciences
- 2004 AAP Fellowship Award in recognition of distinguished service to the Academy for a period of at least 10 years
- 2010 award from the California Society of Periodontists for his outstanding contribution to the specialty of periodontists and personal commitment to the highest professional standards of dentistry.
- 2012 William J. Gies Award for outstanding contribution to the field of periodontology by the American Academy of Periodontology.
