= Troy Mills, Iowa =

- Unincorporated community
- Location in Iowa Location in the United States
- Coordinates: 42°17′24″N 91°40′57″W
- Country: United States
- State: Iowa
- County: Linn
- Township: Spring Grove
- Elevation: 869 ft (265 m)

Population (2000)
  - Total: 248
- Time zone: UTC-6 (Central (CST))
  - Summer (DST): UTC-5 (CDT)
- ZIP codes: 52344
- GNIS feature ID: 462343

Troy Mills is an unincorporated community in northern Linn County, Iowa, United States. It lies along local roads north of the city of Cedar Rapids, the county seat of Linn County. Its elevation is 869 feet (265 m). Although Troy Mills is unincorporated, it has a post office, with the ZIP code of 52344, which opened on 10 June 1867, and a full volunteer fire department.

== History ==
Troy Mills was laid out in 1870. A gristmill and sawmill had existed there previously. Troy Mills' population was 109 in 1902. The population was estimated at 200 in 1940.

== Education ==
The North Linn Community School District operates area public schools.
