= Hotel Mealey =

Historic building in Oelwein, Iowa, US

- U.S. National Register of Historic Places
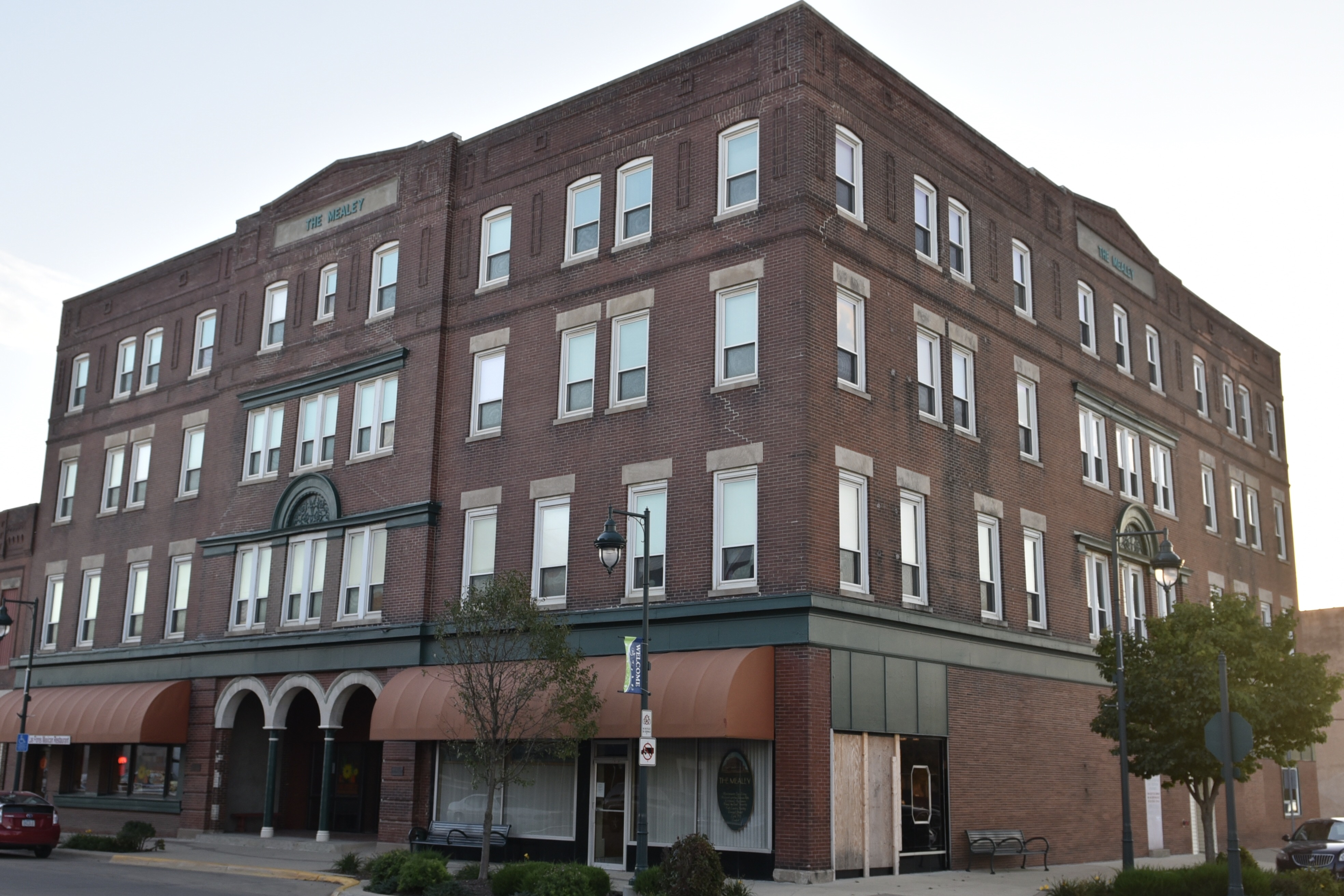

- Location within Iowa Location within the United States
- Location: 102 S. Frederick Ave. Oelwein, Iowa
- Coordinates: 42°40′37″N 91°54′49″W
- Area: less than one acre
- Built: 1898, 1916
- Built by: Thomas Fitzpatrick
- Architect: Marvel & DeMoney
- NRHP reference No.: 83000357
- Added to NRHP: January 27, 1983

Hotel Mealey, also known as Hotel Iowan, is a historic building located in Oelwein, Iowa, United States. The Chicago Great Western Railway reached Oelwein in 1887, and beginning in 1893 they started to expand their operations in the city. Because they moved their shops here, Oelwein experienced a building boom, including this hotel. St. Paul businessman Michael Mealey, whose son James was a local merchant, was responsible for organizing the hotel. The Chicago architectural firm of Marvel & DeMoney designed the building, and Thomas Fitzpatrick of St. Paul was the contractor. The first three floors of the brick structure were completed in 1898, and the top floor was added in 1916. The Boss hotel chain operated the hotel from 1920 to 1969. The hotel's fortunes began to change in 1964 when the Chicago Great Western and the Chicago and North Western Railroad began a merger, and operations in Oelwein were diminished over time. A major ongoing hotel lease was canceled in 1980 that resulted in the hotel's demise. It was last known as the Hotel Iowan. The building was converted into residential use. It was listed on the National Register of Historic Places in 1983.
