= Springville, Iowa =

- City
- Location of Springville, Iowa
- Coordinates: 42°02′49″N 91°27′15″W
- Country: United States
- State: Iowa
- County: Linn

Area
  - Total: 1.46 sq mi (3.78 km^{2})
  - Land: 1.46 sq mi (3.78 km^{2})
  - Water: 0.0039 sq mi (0.01 km^{2})
- Elevation: 866 ft (264 m)

Population (2020)
  - Total: 1,154
  - Density: 790.9/sq mi (305.38/km^{2})
- Time zone: UTC-6 (Central (CST))
  - Summer (DST): UTC-5 (CDT)
- ZIP code: 52336
- Area code: 319
- FIPS code: 19-74775
- GNIS feature ID: 2395944
- Website: City of Springville

Springville is a city in Linn County, Iowa, United States. The population was 1,154 at the time of the 2020 census. It is part of the Cedar Rapids Metropolitan Statistical Area.

== History ==
Springville was laid out on March 22, 1856 by surveyor Samuel W. Durham, under the direction of original settlers Hosea White, Moses P. Wynans, J. P. Hoffman, and Joseph S. Butler.

== Geography ==
According to the United States Census Bureau, the city has a total area of 0.72 square miles (1.86 km^{2}), all land.

== Demographics ==
Historical populations
| Year | Pop. | ±% |
|---|---|---|
| 1880 | 365 | — |
| 1890 | 518 | +41.9% |
| 1900 | 599 | +15.6% |
| 1910 | 588 | −1.8% |
| 1920 | 597 | +1.5% |
| 1930 | 598 | +0.2% |
| 1940 | 608 | +1.7% |
| 1950 | 680 | +11.8% |
| 1960 | 785 | +15.4% |
| 1970 | 970 | +23.6% |
| 1980 | 1,165 | +20.1% |
| 1990 | 1,068 | −8.3% |
| 2000 | 1,091 | +2.2% |
| 2010 | 1,074 | −1.6% |
| 2020 | 1,154 | +7.4% |
Source:"U.S. Census website". United States Census Bureau. and Iowa Data Center; Source: U.S. Decennial Census

=== 2020 census ===
As of the 2020 census, Springville had a population of 1,154 people, with 333 families residing in the city. The population density was 790.9 inhabitants per square mile (305.4/km^{2}). There were 502 housing units at an average density of 344.1 per square mile (132.8/km^{2}).

The median age was 38.9 years. 24.4% of residents were under the age of 18 and 16.8% were 65 years of age or older. 26.1% of residents were under the age of 20; 4.7% were between the ages of 20 and 24; 28.6% were from 25 to 44; and 23.8% were from 45 to 64. The gender makeup of the city was 48.9% male and 51.1% female. For every 100 females there were 95.6 males, and for every 100 females age 18 and over there were 97.5 males.

Of the city's 463 households, 36.7% had children under the age of 18 living with them. Of all households, 56.2% were married-couple households, 7.1% were cohabiting couple households, 20.5% had a female householder with no spouse or partner present, and 16.2% had a male householder with no spouse or partner present. About 28.1% of all households were non-families, 21.6% were made up of individuals, and 7.5% had someone living alone who was 65 years of age or older.

Of all housing units, 7.8% were vacant. The homeowner vacancy rate was 1.1% and the rental vacancy rate was 10.1%. 0.0% of residents lived in urban areas, while 100.0% lived in rural areas.

Racial composition as of the 2020 census
| Race | Number | Percent |
|---|---|---|
| White | 1,081 | 93.7% |
| Black or African American | 2 | 0.2% |
| American Indian and Alaska Native | 9 | 0.8% |
| Asian | 5 | 0.4% |
| Native Hawaiian and Other Pacific Islander | 2 | 0.2% |
| Some other race | 4 | 0.3% |
| Two or more races | 51 | 4.4% |
| Hispanic or Latino (of any race) | 27 | 2.3% |

=== 2010 census ===
As of the census of 2010, there were 1,074 people, 442 households, and 313 families living in the city. The population density was 1,491.7 inhabitants per square mile (575.9/km^{2}). There were 462 housing units at an average density of 641.7 per square mile (247.8/km^{2}). The racial makeup of the city was 98.9% White, 0.1% African American, 0.1% Native American, 0.2% Asian, and 0.7% from two or more races. Hispanic or Latino of any race were 0.3% of the population.

There were 442 households, of which 30.5% had children under the age of 18 living with them, 59.3% were married couples living together, 8.8% had a female householder with no husband present, 2.7% had a male householder with no wife present, and 29.2% were non-families. 23.1% of all households were made up of individuals, and 10.7% had someone living alone who was 65 years of age or older. The average household size was 2.43 and the average family size was 2.86.

The median age in the city was 39.3 years. 22% of residents were under the age of 18; 7.9% were between the ages of 18 and 24; 28.3% were from 25 to 44; 27% were from 45 to 64; and 14.9% were 65 years of age or older. The gender makeup of the city was 48.9% male and 51.1% female.

=== 2000 census ===
As of the census of 2000, there were 1,091 people, 429 households, and 293 families living in the city. The population density was 1,467.7 inhabitants per square mile (566.7/km^{2}). There were 444 housing units at an average density of 597.3 per square mile (230.6/km^{2}). The racial makeup of the city was 98.44% White, 0.09% Native American, 0.64% Asian, 0.27% from other races, and 0.55% from two or more races. Hispanic or Latino of any race were 0.55% of the population.

There were 429 households, out of which 35.9% had children under the age of 18 living with them, 58.3% were married couples living together, 7.7% had a female householder with no husband present, and 31.5% were non-families. 27.3% of all households were made up of individuals, and 13.3% had someone living alone who was 65 years of age or older. The average household size was 2.54 and the average family size was 3.08.

28.0% are under the age of 18, 8.5% from 18 to 24, 28.6% from 25 to 44, 23.7% from 45 to 64, and 11.2% who were 65 years of age or older. The median age was 36 years. For every 100 females, there were 91.7 males. For every 100 females age 18 and over, there were 90.8 males.

The median income for a household in the city was $44,567, and the median income for a family was $53,088. Males had a median income of $33,000 versus $25,129 for females. The per capita income for the city was $18,429. About 2.7% of families and 5.1% of the population were below the poverty line, including 2.1% of those under age 18 and 15.6% of those age 65 or over.
