= Maple View Sanitarium =

- U.S. National Register of Historic Places
- U.S. Historic district – Contributing property
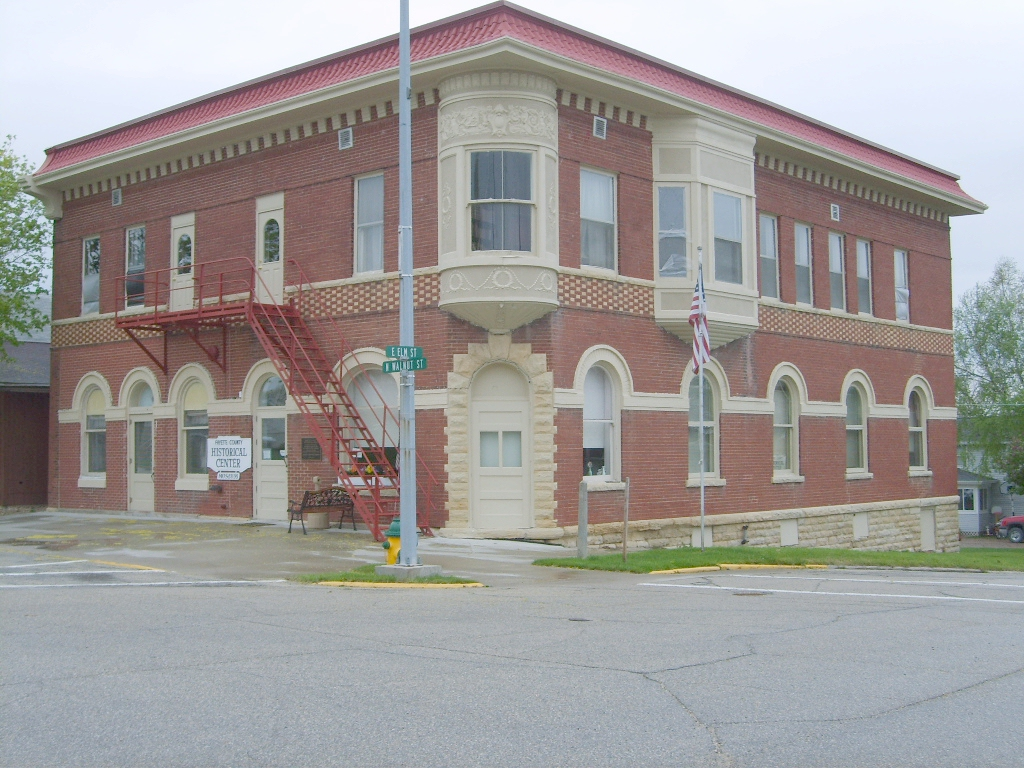

- Location within Iowa Location within the United States
- Location: 100 N. Walnut St. West Union, Iowa
- Coordinates: 42°41′0.7″N 91°54′46.6″W
- Area: less than one acre
- Built: 1903
- Architectural style: Late 19th and 20th Century Revivals
- Part of: West Union Commercial Historic District (ID15000191)
- NRHP reference No.: 98000866
- Added to NRHP: July 21, 1998

Maple View Sanitarium, also known as Community Hospital, Good Samaritan Nursing Home, and the Fayette County Historical Center, is a historic building located in West Union, Iowa, United States. It was built by Dr. Frank Beach Whitmore in 1903. The facility could accommodate 12 to 15 patients, it had its own operating room, and office. There was also a general store located in the commercial space on the main floor. Because medical care in a hospital was new in the community, it did not succeed and it folded in 1905. Whitmore left to become a missionary in China. The building housed professional offices and retail businesses until 1914 when the Nurses' Benevolent Association under the auspices of the Seventh-day Adventist Church bought the building for a hospital. It was more successful as a hospital the second time, and it was acquired by the city for a community hospital in 1920. After a new hospital building was constructed in 1951, the Good Samaritan Society bought the building for a nursing home. By 1973 changes in state law no longer made operating a nursing home here feasible. The Fayette County Historical Society acquired the building in 1975 for its use, and it operates a local history museum in the building. It was individually listed on the National Register of Historic Places in 1998. In 2015 it was included as a contributing property in the West Union Commercial Historic District.
