= Strawberry Point, Iowa =

- City
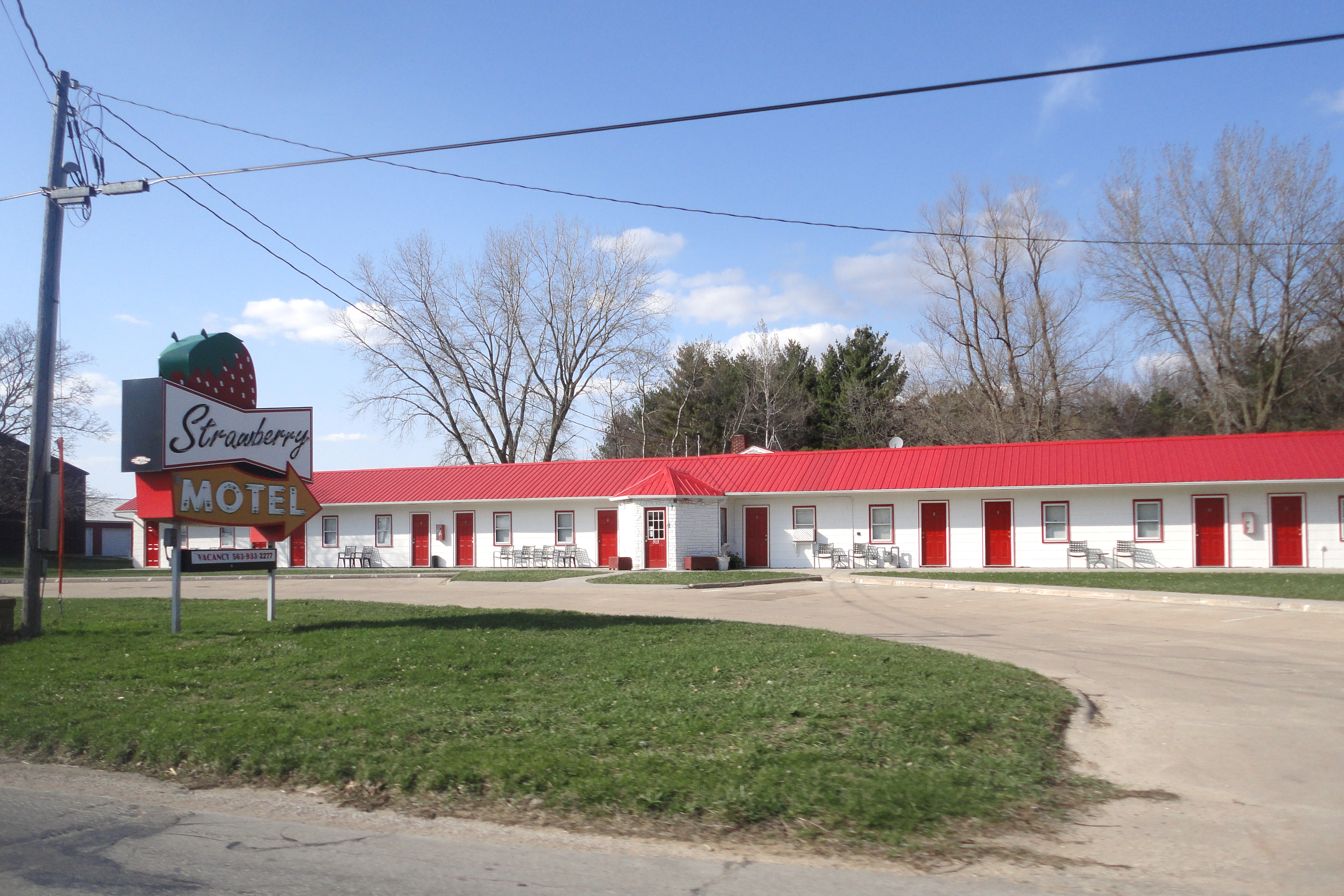
- The Strawberry Motel

- Location of Strawberry Point, Iowa
- Coordinates: 42°40′50″N 91°32′05″W
- Country: United States
- State: Iowa
- County: Clayton

Area
  - Total: 2.09 sq mi (5.41 km^{2})
  - Land: 2.09 sq mi (5.41 km^{2})
  - Water: 0 sq mi (0.00 km^{2})
- Elevation: 1,198 ft (365 m)

Population (2020)
  - Total: 1,155
  - Density: 553.2/sq mi (213.58/km^{2})
- Time zone: UTC-6 (Central (CST))
  - Summer (DST): UTC-5 (CDT)
- ZIP code: 52076
- Area code: 563
- FIPS code: 19-75855
- GNIS feature ID: 2395986
- Website: Strawberry Point Portal

Strawberry Point is a city in Clayton County, Iowa, United States. The population was 1,155 at the time of the 2020 United States census, down from 1,386 in 2000 census. Strawberry Point is home to the world's largest strawberry (a 15-foot fiberglass statue), and the Franklin Hotel, which was listed on the National Register of Historic Places in 1999. Backbone State Park, Iowa's oldest state park, is located a few miles from the town.

== Geography ==
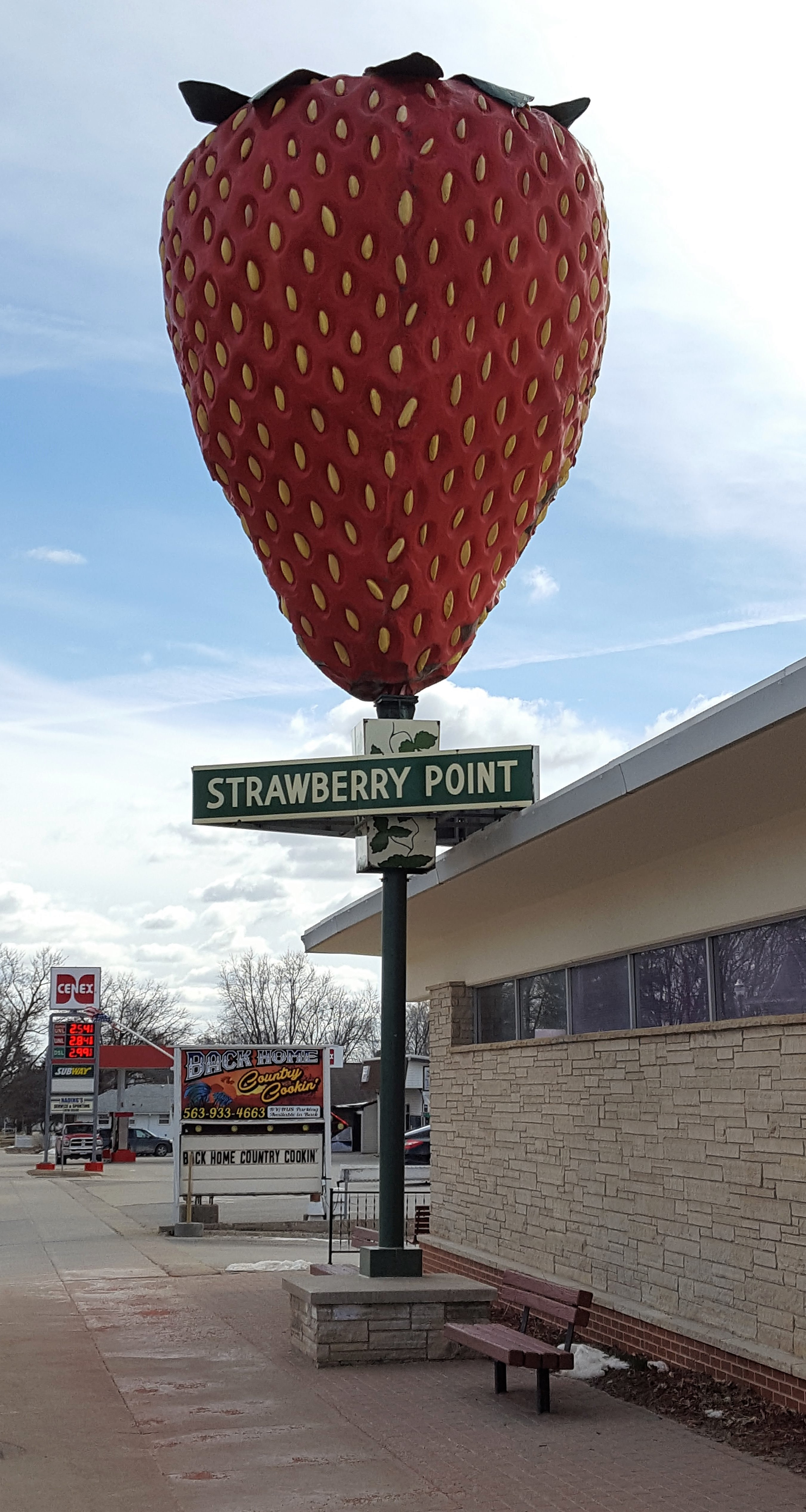
World's largest strawberry.

Strawberry Point's longitude and latitude coordinates in decimal form are 42.679195, -91.536891.

According to the United States Census Bureau, the city has a total area of 2.11 square miles (5.46 km^{2}), all land.

== Demographics ==
Historical populations
Year	Pop.	±%
1880	715	—
1890	947	+32.4%
1900	1,012	+6.9%
1910	1,052	+4.0%
1920	1,101	+4.7%
1930	1,128	+2.5%
1940	1,223	+8.4%
1950	1,247	+2.0%
1960	1,303	+4.5%
1970	1,281	−1.7%
1980	1,463	+14.2%
1990	1,357	−7.2%
2000	1,386	+2.1%
2010	1,279	−7.7%
2020	1,155	−9.7%
Source:"U.S. Census website". United States Census Bureau. and Iowa Data Center; Source: U.S. Decennial Census

=== 2020 census ===
As of the 2020 census, there were 1,155 people, 508 households, and 302 families residing in the city. The population density was 553.2 inhabitants per square mile (213.6/km^{2}). The median age was 42.3 years. 22.7% of residents were under the age of 18, and 24.6% were under the age of 20; 4.4% were between the ages of 20 and 24; 23.5% were from 25 to 44; 24.4% were from 45 to 64; and 23.0% were 65 years of age or older. The gender makeup of the city was 50.3% male and 49.7% female. For every 100 females there were 101.2 males, and for every 100 females age 18 and over there were 98.9 males.

Of the 508 households, 28.5% had children under the age of 18 living with them. Of all households, 43.9% were married-couple households, 8.3% were cohabiting-couple households, 21.3% were households with a male householder and no spouse or partner present, and 26.6% were households with a female householder and no spouse or partner present. About 40.6% of households were non-families, 35.6% of all households were made up of individuals, and 14.7% had someone living alone who was 65 years of age or older.

There were 566 housing units at an average density of 271.1 per square mile (104.7/km^{2}), of which 10.2% were vacant. The homeowner vacancy rate was 2.9% and the rental vacancy rate was 9.2%.

0.0% of residents lived in urban areas, while 100.0% lived in rural areas.

Racial composition as of the 2020 census
Race	Number	Percent
White	1,088	94.2%
Black or African American	5	0.4%
American Indian and Alaska Native	6	0.5%
Asian	0	0.0%
Native Hawaiian and Other Pacific Islander	2	0.2%
Some other race	2	0.2%
Two or more races	52	4.5%
Hispanic or Latino (of any race)	25	2.2%

=== 2010 census ===
As of the census of 2010, there were 1,279 people, 559 households, and 348 families living in the city. The population density was 606.2 inhabitants per square mile (234.1/km^{2}). There were 622 housing units at an average density of 294.8 per square mile (113.8/km^{2}). The racial makeup of the city was 97.5% White, 1% African American, 0.1% Native American, 0.3% Pacific Islander, 0.2% from other races, and 0.6% from two or more races. Hispanic or Latino of any race were 0.9% of the population.

There were 559 households, of which 27.0% had children under the age of 18 living with them, 50.3% were married couples living together, 7.0% had a female householder with no husband present, 5.0% had a male householder with no wife present, and 37.7% were non-families. 34.3% of all households were made up of individuals, and 20.2% had someone living alone who was 65 years of age or older. The average household size was 2.19 and the average family size was 2.79.

The median age in the city was 45.2 years. 22.4% of residents were under the age of 18; 6.3% were between the ages of 18 and 24; 21% were from 25 to 44; 26.5% were from 45 to 64; and 23.8% were 65 years of age or older. The gender makeup of the city was 47.9% male and 52.1% female.

=== 2000 census ===
As of the census of 2000, there were 1,386 people, 531 households, and 347 families living in the city. The population density was 677.7 inhabitants per square mile (261.7/km^{2}). There were 560 housing units at an average density of 273.8 per square mile (105.7/km^{2}). The racial makeup of the city was 99.21% White, 0.07% Native American, 0.07% from other races, and 0.65% from two or more races. Hispanic or Latino of any race were 0.58% of the population.

There were 531 households, out of which 32.0% had children under the age of 18 living with them, 54.6% were married couples living together, 7.9% had a female householder with no husband present, and 34.5% were non-families. 30.1% of all households were made up of individuals, and 17.9% had someone living alone who was 65 years of age or older. The average household size was 2.39 and the average family size was 2.98.

In the city, the population was spread out, with 25.5% under the age of 18, 6.0% from 18 to 24, 25.0% from 25 to 44, 18.4% from 45 to 64, and 25.1% who were 65 years of age or older. The median age was 40 years. For every 100 females, there were 86.3 males. For every 100 females age 18 and over, there were 80.1 males.

The median income for a household in the city was $34,766, and the median income for a family was $45,268. Males had a median income of $30,300 versus $21,289 for females. The per capita income for the city was $18,400. About 4.6% of families and 5.9% of the population were below the poverty line, including 4.3% of those under age 18 and 11.9% of those age 65 or over.

== Education ==
Strawberry Point is served by Starmont Community School District that includes a high school, middle school and elementary school.

== Notable people ==
- Dorothy Gill Barnes, artist
- Michael Breitbach, Iowa State Senator.
