= Hardware Building (Wadena, Iowa) =

- U.S. National Register of Historic Places
- Location within Iowa Location within the United States
- Location: 223 Mill St. Wadena, Iowa
- Coordinates: 42°50′23.3″N 91°39′26″W
- Area: less than one acre
- Built: 1873
- NRHP reference No.: 77000516
- Added to NRHP: July 15, 1977

The Hardware Building was a historic building located in Wadena, Iowa, United States. Completed in 1873, this two-story gabled structure was completely composed of limestone. At some point the second floor of the main facade was covered with brick and it had a patterned brick cornice. The first floor sat high off the ground and was accessed by a double exterior staircase. Originally, the building housed a hardware store on the main floor, a storeroom on the second floor, and a saloon in the basement. In later years it housed the post office and the local telephone exchange. The building was listed on the National Register of Historic Places in 1977. It has subsequently been torn down.
