= Arlington, Iowa =

- City
- Motto: Where hills and prairie meet.
- Location of Arlington, Iowa
- Coordinates: 42°45′05″N 91°40′16″W
- Country: United States
- State: Iowa
- County: Fayette

Area
  - Total: 1.00 sq mi (2.60 km^{2})
  - Land: 1.00 sq mi (2.60 km^{2})
  - Water: 0 sq mi (0.00 km^{2})
- Elevation: 1,135 ft (346 m)

Population (2020)
  - Total: 419
  - Density: 417.6/sq mi (161.23/km^{2})
- Time zone: UTC-6 (Central (CST))
  - Summer (DST): UTC-5 (CDT)
- ZIP code: 50606
- Area code: 563
- FIPS code: 19-02845
- GNIS feature ID: 2393986

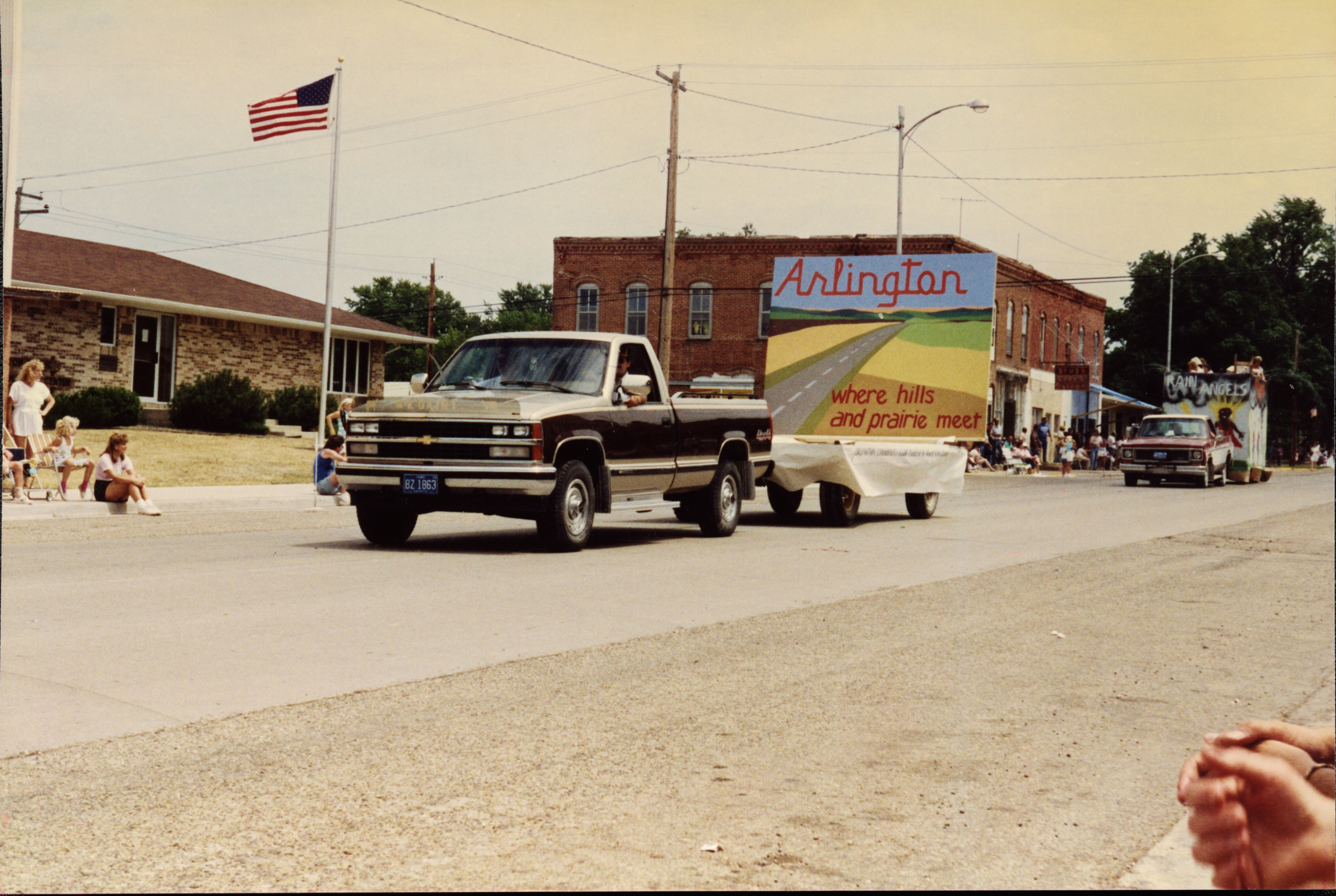
Main Street, Arlington, Iowa

Arlington is a city in Fayette County, Iowa, United States. The population was 419 in the 2020 census, a decline from the 490 population in the 2000 census.

== History ==
Arlington was originally called Brush Creek. The community was first settled in 1854.

== Geography ==
Arlington is located just north of the headwaters of the Maquoketa River.

According to the United States Census Bureau, the city has a total area of 1.05 square miles (2.72 km^{2}), all land.

== Demographics ==
Historical population
Census	Pop.	Note	%±
1890	593		—
1900	863		45.5%
1910	678		−21.4%
1920	729		7.5%
1930	706		−3.2%
1940	675		−4.4%
1950	661		−2.1%
1960	614		−7.1%
1970	481		−21.7%
1980	498		3.5%
1990	465		−6.6%
2000	490		5.4%
2010	429		−12.4%
2020	419		−2.3%
U.S. Decennial Census

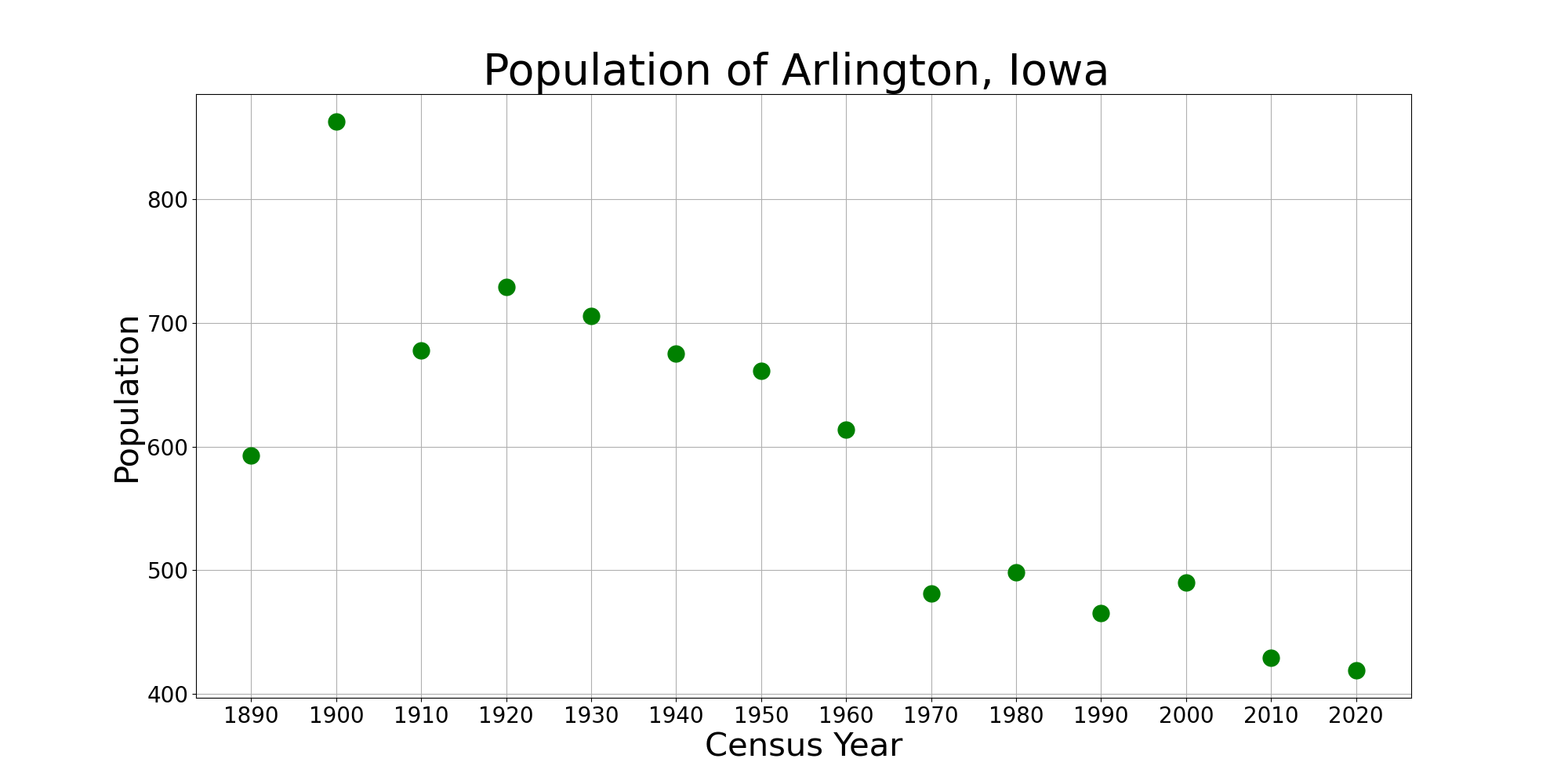
The population of Arlington, Iowa from US census data

=== 2020 census ===
As of the census of 2020, there were 419 people, 187 households, and 124 families residing in the city. The population density was 417.6 inhabitants per square mile (161.2/km^{2}). There were 202 housing units at an average density of 201.3 per square mile (77.7/km^{2}). The racial makeup of the city was 95.2% White, 0.7% Black or African American, 0.0% Native American, 0.0% Asian, 0.0% Pacific Islander, 1.4% from other races and 2.6% from two or more races. Hispanic or Latino persons of any race comprised 1.4% of the population.

Of the 187 households, 26.7% of which had children under the age of 18 living with them, 49.7% were married couples living together, 6.4% were cohabitating couples, 23.5% had a female householder with no spouse or partner present and 20.3% had a male householder with no spouse or partner present. 33.7% of all households were non-families. 28.3% of all households were made up of individuals, 13.4% had someone living alone who was 65 years old or older.

The median age in the city was 46.8 years. 22.9% of the residents were under the age of 20; 5.3% were between the ages of 20 and 24; 19.3% were from 25 and 44; 27.4% were from 45 and 64; and 25.1% were 65 years of age or older. The gender makeup of the city was 49.4% male and 50.6% female.

=== 2010 census ===
As of the census of 2010, there were 429 people, 191 households, and 122 families living in the city. The population density was 408.6 inhabitants per square mile (157.8/km^{2}). There were 212 housing units at an average density of 201.9 per square mile (78.0/km^{2}). The racial makeup of the city was 98.8% White, 0.7% Native American, 0.2% Asian, and 0.2% from two or more races.

There were 191 households, of which 27.7% had children under the age of 18 living with them, 51.8% were married couples living together, 8.4% had a female householder with no husband present, 3.7% had a male householder with no wife present, and 36.1% were non-families. 31.4% of all households were made up of individuals, and 16.7% had someone living alone who was 65 years of age or older. The average household size was 2.25 and the average family size was 2.79.

The median age in the city was 45.5 years. 20% of residents were under the age of 18; 8.9% were between the ages of 18 and 24; 20.6% were from 25 to 44; 32.2% were from 45 to 64; and 18.4% were 65 years of age or older. The gender makeup of the city was 49.4% male and 50.6% female.

=== 2000 census ===
As of the census of 2000, there were 490 people, 212 households, and 140 families living in the city. The population density was 467.4 inhabitants per square mile (180.5/km^{2}). There were 230 housing units at an average density of 219.4 per square mile (84.7/km^{2}). The racial makeup of the city was 99.39% White, 0.41% Native American and 0.20% Asian.

There were 212 households, out of which 25.9% had children under the age of 18 living with them, 52.4% were married couples living together, 9.4% had a female householder with no husband present, and 33.5% were non-families. 30.2% of all households were made up of individuals, and 17.5% had someone living alone who was 65 years of age or older. The average household size was 2.31 and the average family size was 2.87.

In the city, the population was spread out, with 25.9% under the age of 18, 5.3% from 18 to 24, 22.4% from 25 to 44, 24.7% from 45 to 64, and 21.6% who were 65 years of age or older. The median age was 43 years. For every 100 females, there were 83.5 males. For every 100 females age 18 and over, there were 83.3 males.

The median income for a household in the city was $30,357, and the median income for a family was $37,083. Males had a median income of $25,938 versus $17,031 for females. The per capita income for the city was $14,643. About 11.9% of families and 14.9% of the population were below the poverty line, including 24.6% of those under age 18 and 12.5% of those age 65 or over.

== Education ==
Arlington is served by Starmont Community School District that includes a high school, middle school and elementary school.

== Transportation ==
Arlington is located on Iowa Highway 187.

== Notable people ==
- Percy R. Kelly (1870–1949), 26th Chief Justice of the Oregon Supreme Court
- Brian Schoenjahn (born 1949), former Iowa State Senator
- William Henry Thompson (1853–1937), U.S. Senator and Nebraska Supreme Court justice
