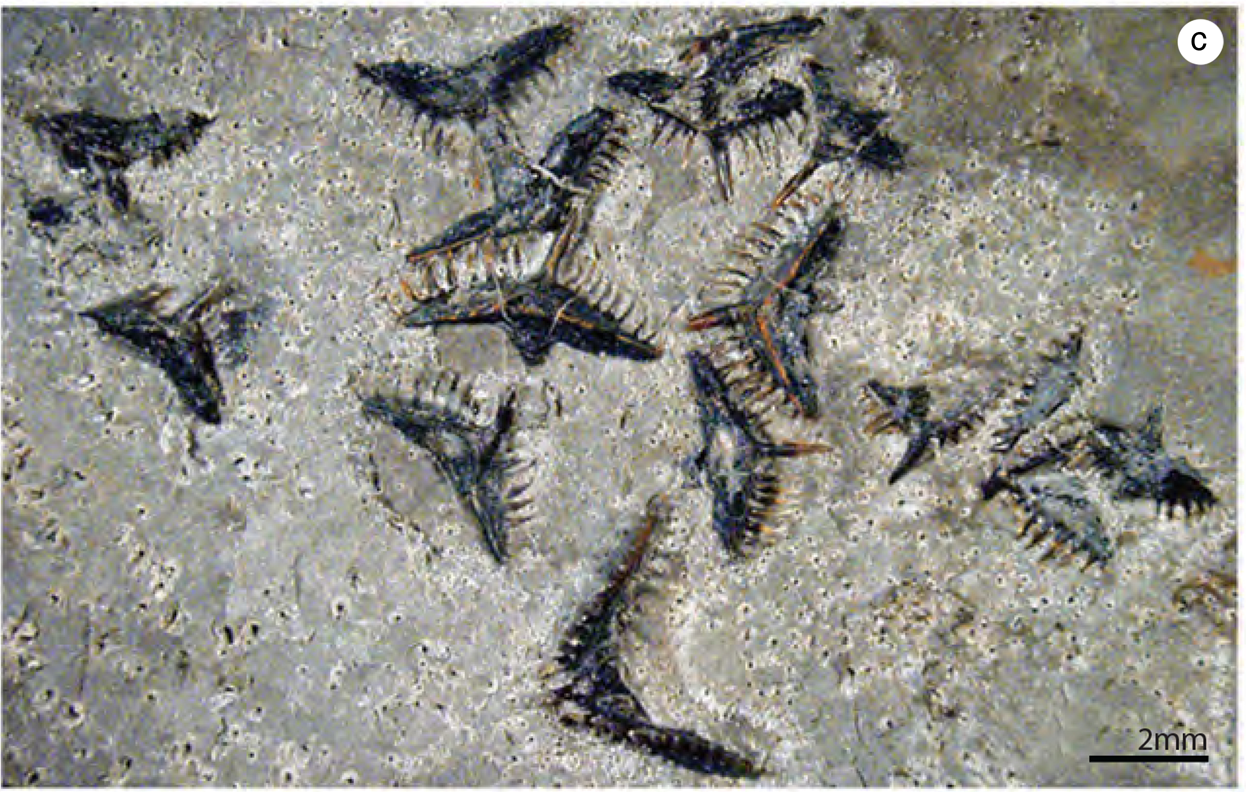
- The holotype apparatus belonging to I. grandis (SUI 139888)

Scientific classification
- Kingdom: Animalia
- Phylum: Chordata
- Infraphylum: Agnatha
- Class: †Conodonta
- Family: †Iowagnathidae
- Genus: †Iowagnathus; Liu et al., 2017
- Species: †I. grandis

Binomial name
- †Iowagnathus grandis Liu et al., 2017

= Iowagnathus =

Iowagnathus Temporal range: Darriwilian, 467.3–458.4 Ma

Extinct genus of Conodont

Iowagnathus is an extinct genus of large macropredatory conodont (an extinct group of agnathans) known mainly from Ordovician strata in North America, with potential occurrences in similarly aged strata from Siberia. A single species is known, Iowagnathus grandis, which was described by Liu et al., 2017 based on multiple oral apparatuses discovered in the Darriwilian aged Winneshiek Shale in northeastern Iowa. This genus is currently placed within the Iowagnathidae family, potentially as a basal member of the larger prioniodinina suborder.

This genus is rather unique, as the elements and apparatuses discovered are quite large compared to most other conodonts, with one S_{0} element alone having a lateral width of around 16 mm (1.6 cm). The large sizes of the elements and apparatuses suggests a potential size of up to 1.0 m (3.3 ft) long for the full animal, potentially making this genus among the largest known conodonts yet discovered. As with most other conodonts though, no fossils preserving the body of the animal are currently known, with the potential sizes being found by comparing the size of its apparatuses and elements to those of other genera like Clydagnathus, which is known from preserved body fossils. This conodont may be one of the potential makers of the various bromalite specimens that have been found within the Winneshiek Shale, which usually include the elements of other conodonts. All of these factors suggest that this genus was a macropredator, occupying a high trophic level within its environment, a lifestyle rare in jawless vertebrates.

== Background ==
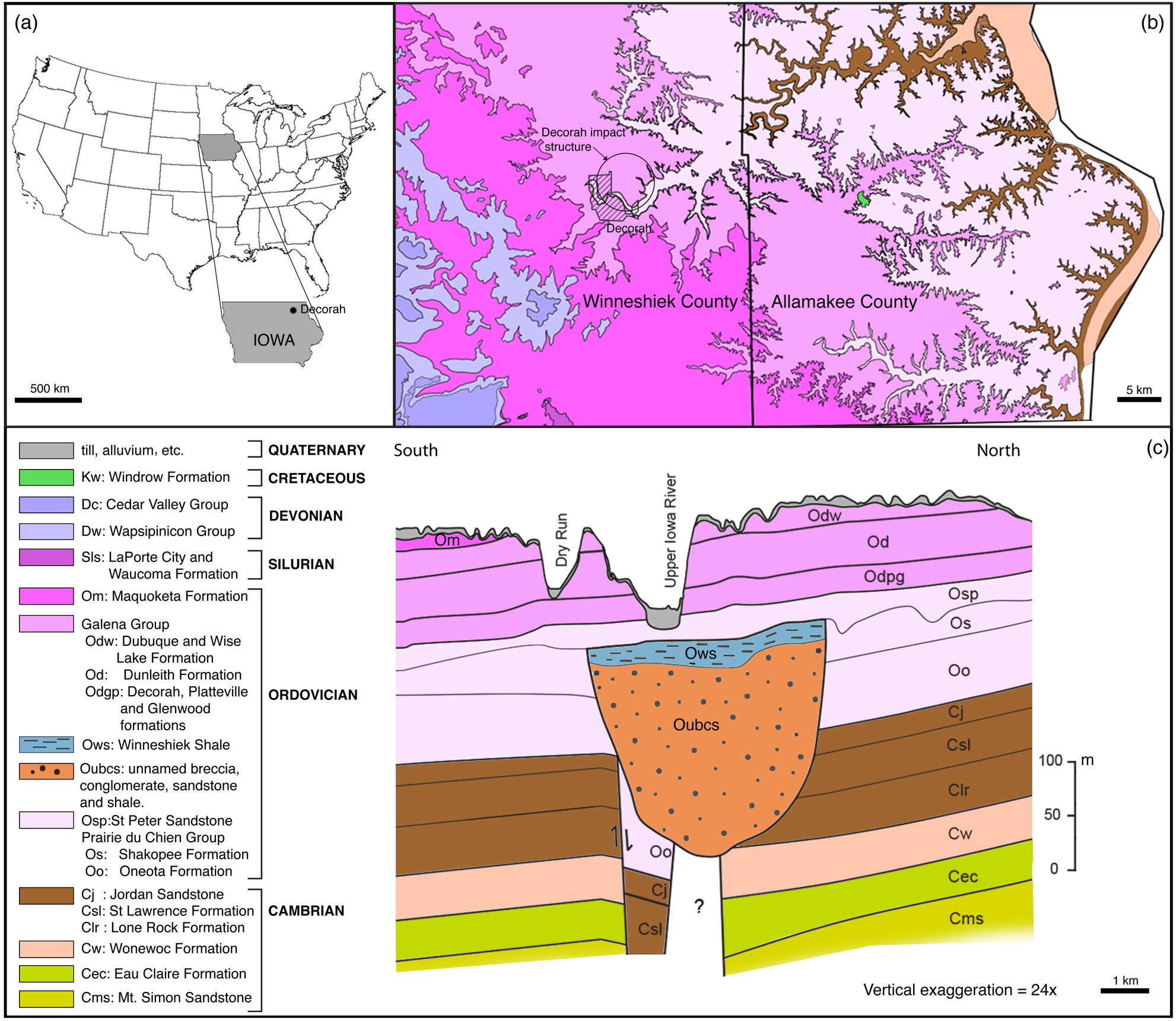
Geological map of the Decorah area, showing the impact crater and the Winneshiek Shale.

Located near the town of Decorah in northeastern Iowa, the Winneshiek Shale is a Lagerstätten fossil site dating to the Darriwilian stage of the middle Ordovician, and underlies the larger St. Peter Sandstone. The only known area that exposes the site (the upper strata at least) are thin outcrops along the Upper Iowa River, located in Winneshiek County. The shale is known only from within the confines of the Decorah crater, a probable impact crater that was formed before the final deposition of the shale, and would've created deep anoxic areas during the Ordovician that was favorable to the exceptional fossilization of the fossils found within the shale. The environment of the shale is most often reconstructed as a nearshore environment, either an estuary, or a calm marine basin, with an anoxic, low-pH seabed. The fauna of the site, known as the Winneshiek Biota, mostly lacks benthic taxa, most likely due to the low oxygen environment of the site, and the majority of the fauna were either nekto-benthic, or were nektonic. The fossils from the site are primarily composed of conodont elements and bromalites, with a number of arthropods (primarily various crustaceans and chelicerates), agnathans, algae, gastropods and brachiopods making up the rest of the biota.

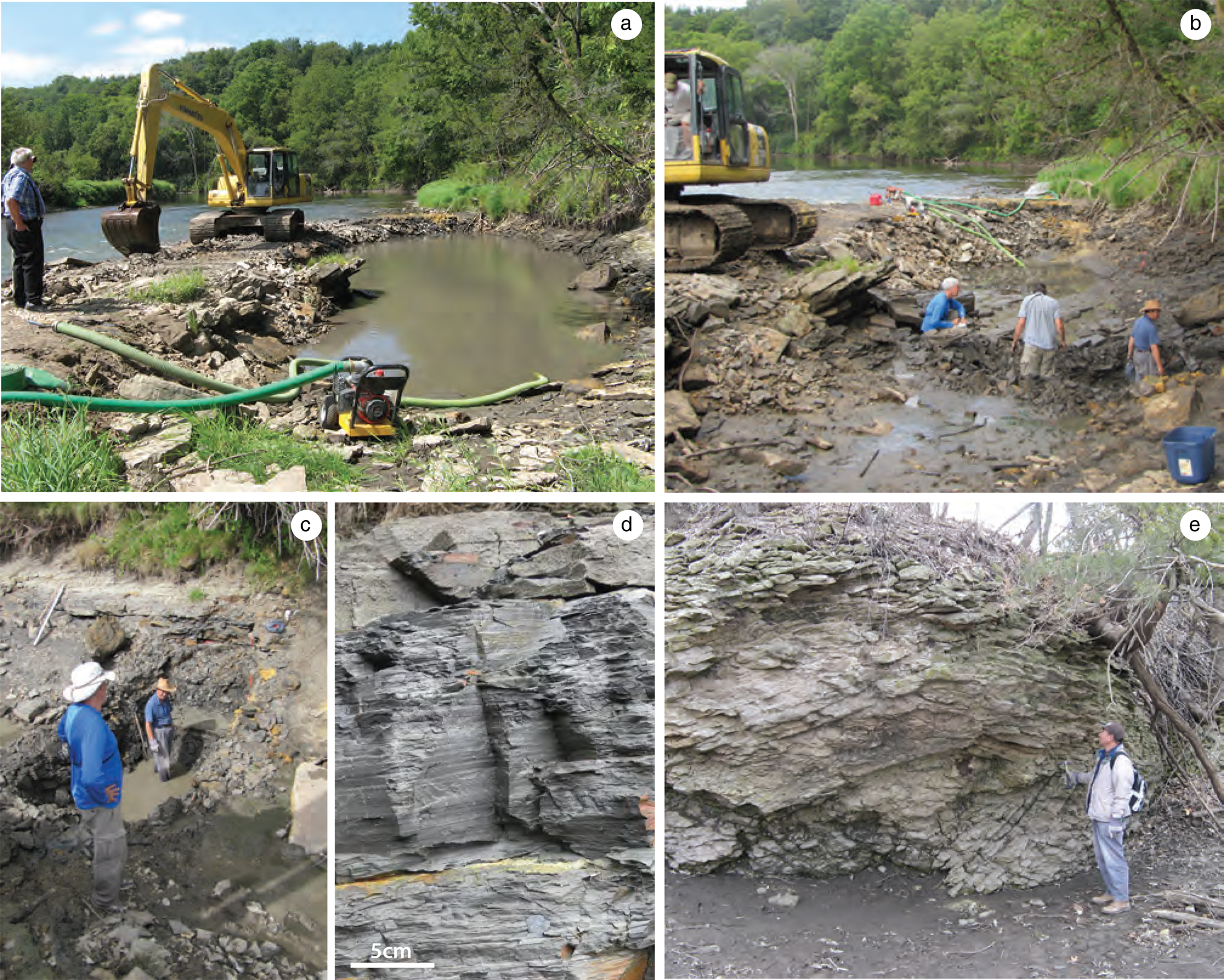
Outcrops of the Winneshiek Shale next to the Upper Iowa River.

== Discovery and naming ==
Iowagnathus was originally described by Liu et al., 2017, on the basis of multiple well preserved apparatuses including the holotype and paratype specimens (SUI 139888 and SUI 139887 respectively). Iowagnathus is one of the most commonly found conodont genera known from the Winneshiek biota, alongside the contemporary species Archeognathus primus. In the original description, this genus was recognized as distinct enough from other conodont genera, including Erismodus, Paraprioniodus and Erraticodon, due to differences in element placement, and overall apparatus morphology, to be placed in a new genus and species. A new family, the Iowagnathidae, was also erected to include it. This genus is one of the few members of the Winneshiek Biota not definitively known from other deposits, with the only other potential occurrence of it outside of Iowa being similar conodont elements found within middle Ordovician strata of Siberia.

The conodonts genus name, Iowagnathus, is derived from the state of Iowa, and the Greek word gnathos, meaning "jaw. the species name, grandis is derived from the Latin word grandis, meaning "big, or "large" due to the exceptional size of the apparatus and elements belonging to this species.

== Description ==
The apparatus of Iowagnathus is relatively complex compared to those of other conodonts, with fifteen elements total, including nine S elements, four P elements, and two M elements in total. The majority of the elements in the apparatus, with the exception of the S_{0} element, form pairs with one another. The elements are ramiform in appearance, showing a distinctive ray-like shape, and are heavily denticulated. The S elements are by far the most numerous type in the apparatus, with four pairs comprising the S_{1}-S_{4} elements, as well as the unpaired S_{0} element. There are also two pairs of P elements, comprising the P_{1}-P_{2} elements, and a single pair of M elements. All of the elements show copious amounts of denticles, which are very pointed, and are both fibrous and hyaline in structure. The only element to not form a pair in the apparatus, the S_{0} element, is symmetrical, and both show a unique alate appearance, and a fewer number of denticles compared to the other elements, which are either asymmetrical or somewhat symmetrical in appearance, and have more denticles. The crown of the elements are attached to a basal body, a robust structure that is only found alongside the crown in areas with exceptional preservation. The elements themselves are very large, with a length of around 16 mm (1.6 cm) long usually being recorded, however, one S_{0} element (belonging to the specimen SUI 139895) has a lateral width alone of around 16 mm, placing it among the largest known recorded conodont elements. The apparatuses themselves were also notably large, with estimations based on incomplete apparatuses and elements suggesting a size of around 20–30 mm (2–3 cm) long. Like with most other conodont species, no fossils preserving the body are known from I. grandis, making definitive size estimations difficult. However, using size comparisons between the apparatus of I. grandis compared to those of other conodonts, such as Clydagnathus (which is known from body fossils) suggests a potential size of up to 1.0 m (3.3 ft) long for the full animal, which would make I. grandis one of the largest conodonts so far described.

== Classification ==
Alongside designating I. grandis as a new genus and species, Liu et al., 2017 also erected a new family, the Iowagnathidae, to include it. Although this species placement within conodonta has not yet been fully resolved, due to the autapomorphic nature of its elements, the oral structure of this species bears some resemblance to prioniodinin type apparatuses, due to the structure of its P elements and denticles, suggesting a possible basal placement for this taxon in the group. Conodonts as a group have had an interesting taxonomic history, as for more than hundred years after their initial discovery in 1856, they were only known from their phosphatic elements. It wouldn't be until the late 20th century when body fossils from a handful of species were discovered, confidently placing conodonts as agnathan vertebrates.

== Paleoecology ==
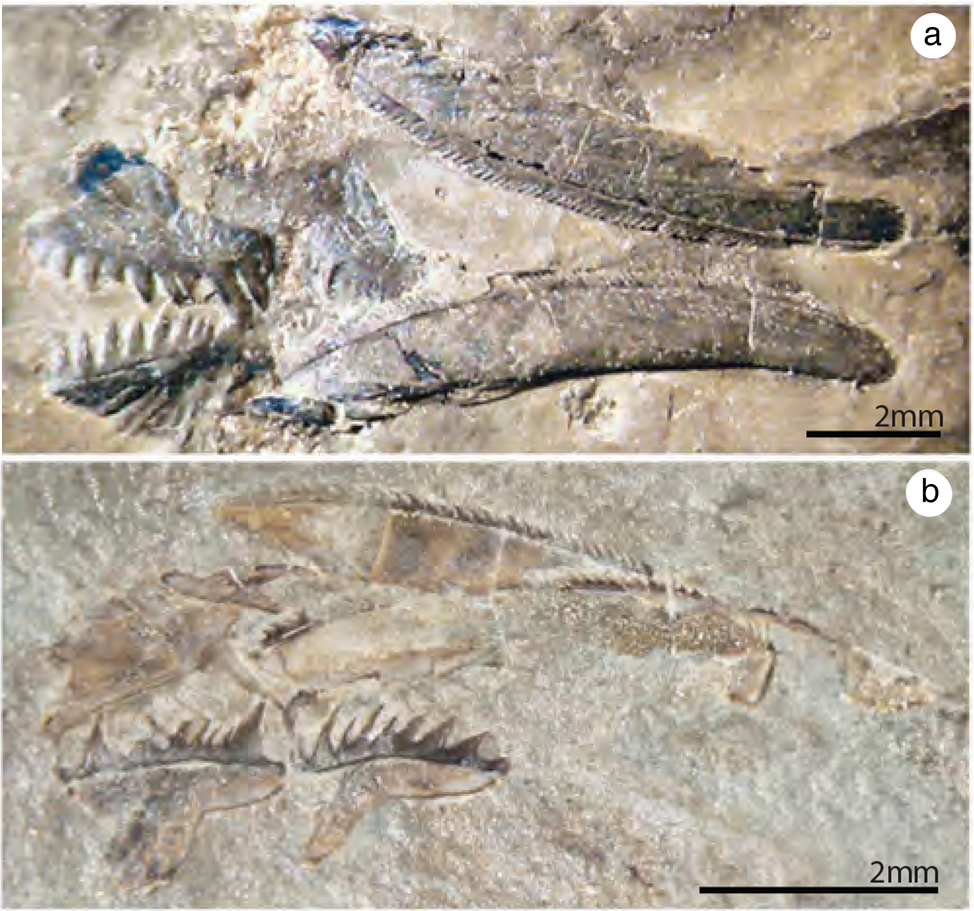
Multiple apparatuses belonging to Archeognathus primus, a large macropredatory conodont, and a contemporary species to I. grandis.

Iowagnathus possesses several unique traits compared to other conodonts, including an exceptionally large apparatus, and the elements within the apparatus, as well as the potential large size of the full animal. The large size of this species elements suggest that it was hunting larger prey then most other conodonts, and both Liu et al., 2017 and Briggs et al., 2018 suggest a macropredatory lifestyle for this species. This fits with the features seen in other macropredatory conodonts, such as Archeognathus, Panderodus, and Promissum, including large body sizes and or large apparatuses and elements. This suggests that I. grandis occupied a high trophic level in its environment, and the common occurrences of bromalites containing conodont elements within the Winneshiek Shale, which may or may not have been produced by I. grandis, indicates that at least some form of predation was occurring within the area at the time. Because of the anoxic, low pH conditions of the benthic section of the Winneshiek Shale during the Darriwilian, and the overall lack of benthic taxa, I. grandis would've most likely have been nektonic (actively swimming in the water column), or nekto-benthic (swimming close to, or just above the seafloor). Living alongside I. grandis were a number of other large macropredators, including the Archeognathus primus, another large macropredatory conodont. The main difference between the two species is that the apparatus of A. primus is significantly less complex then that of I. grandis, with only six elements total making up the apparatus, compared to the fifteen in I. grandis. Another contemporary macropredator in the Winneshiek Shale was Pentecopterus decorahensis, a large eurypterid belonging to the megalograptid family that was the largest organism in the biota. The large number of macropredators suggests that the environment at the time was nutrient rich, however it is not known how long the predatory species were living in the area, or if they were seasonal visitors.
