= Castle Rock State Park =

Castle Rock State Park is the name of two parks in the United States:

- Castle Rock State Park (California)
- Castle Rock State Park (Illinois)
