= Clayton School =

Clayton School may refer to:

- Clayton School (Clayton, Iowa), listed on the National Register of Historic Places in Clayton County, Iowa
- Clayton School (Clayton, Washington), listed on the National Register of Historic Places in Stevens County, Washington
