= Garnavillo, Iowa =

- City
- Garnavillo water tower in 2021
- Motto: Gem of the Prairie
- Location of Garnavillo, Iowa
- Coordinates: 42°52′00″N 91°14′10″W
- Country: United States
- State: Iowa
- County: Clayton

Area
  - Total: 0.94 sq mi (2.44 km^{2})
  - Land: 0.94 sq mi (2.44 km^{2})
  - Water: 0 sq mi (0.00 km^{2})
- Elevation: 1,043 ft (318 m)

Population (2020)
  - Total: 763
  - Density: 809/sq mi (312.2/km^{2})
- Time zone: UTC-6 (Central (CST))
  - Summer (DST): UTC-5 (CDT)
- ZIP code: 52049
- Area code: 563
- FIPS code: 19-29910
- GNIS feature ID: 2394856
- Website: www.garnavilloia.com

Garnavillo is a city in Clayton County, Iowa, United States. The population was 763 at the time of the 2020 census, up from 754 in 2000.

== History ==
Garnavillo once served as county seat of Clayton County.

== Geography ==
The town sits on top of the St Peter formation.

According to the United States Census Bureau, the city has a total area of 1.02 square miles (2.64 km^{2}), all land.

== Demographics ==
Historical populations
Year	Pop.	±%
1880	345	—
1890	336	−2.6%
1900	339	+0.9%
1910	342	+0.9%
1920	314	−8.2%
1930	365	+16.2%
1940	461	+26.3%
1950	581	+26.0%
1960	662	+13.9%
1970	634	−4.2%
1980	723	+14.0%
1990	727	+0.6%
2000	754	+3.7%
2010	745	−1.2%
2020	763	+2.4%
Source:"U.S. Census website". United States Census Bureau. and Iowa Data Center; Source: U.S. Decennial Census

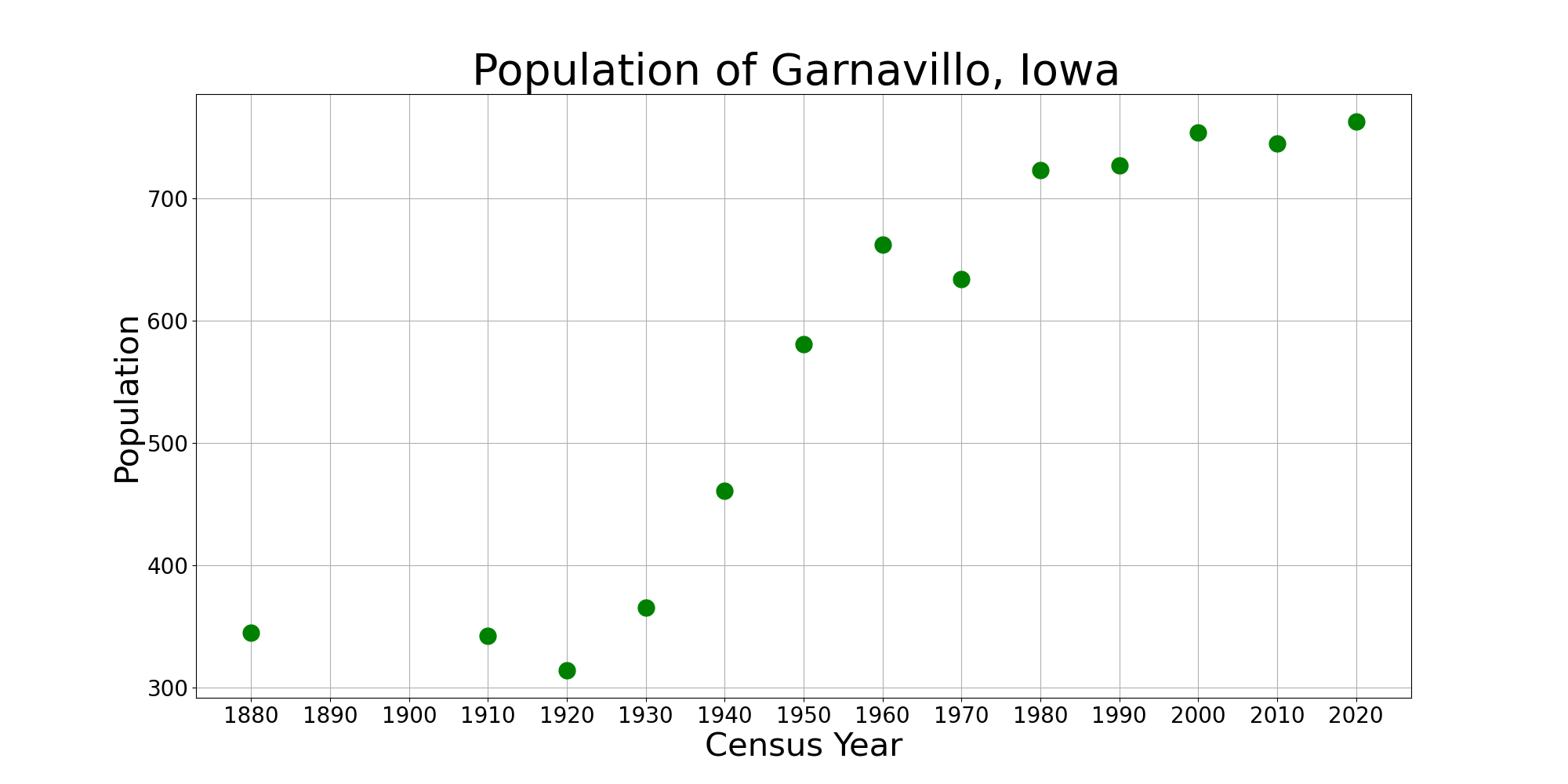
The population of Garnavillo, Iowa from US census data

=== 2020 census ===
As of the census of 2020, there were 763 people, 315 households, and 175 families residing in the city. The population density was 808.6 inhabitants per square mile (312.2/km^{2}). There were 341 housing units at an average density of 361.4 per square mile (139.5/km^{2}). The racial makeup of the city was 94.5% White, 0.9% Black or African American, 0.1% Native American, 0.0% Asian, 0.1% Pacific Islander, 2.4% from other races and 2.0% from two or more races. Hispanic or Latino persons of any race comprised 4.8% of the population.

Of the 315 households, 21.6% of which had children under the age of 18 living with them, 45.4% were married couples living together, 6.3% were cohabitating couples, 28.3% had a female householder with no spouse or partner present and 20.0% had a male householder with no spouse or partner present. 44.4% of all households were non-families. 39.0% of all households were made up of individuals, 21.3% had someone living alone who was 65 years old or older.

The median age in the city was 47.6 years. 20.7% of the residents were under the age of 20; 3.1% were between the ages of 20 and 24; 24.5% were from 25 and 44; 22.0% were from 45 and 64; and 29.6% were 65 years of age or older. The gender makeup of the city was 49.1% male and 50.9% female.

=== 2010 census ===
As of the census of 2010, there were 745 people, 332 households, and 201 families living in the city. The population density was 730.4 inhabitants per square mile (282.0/km^{2}). There were 359 housing units at an average density of 352.0 per square mile (135.9/km^{2}). The racial makeup of the city was 98.3% White, 0.5% African American, 0.8% from other races, and 0.4% from two or more races. Hispanic or Latino of any race were 1.6% of the population.

There were 332 households, of which 22.3% had children under the age of 18 living with them, 47.9% were married couples living together, 8.1% had a female householder with no husband present, 4.5% had a male householder with no wife present, and 39.5% were non-families. 35.5% of all households were made up of individuals, and 22.3% had someone living alone who was 65 years of age or older. The average household size was 2.16 and the average family size was 2.73.

The median age in the city was 48.5 years. 17.7% of residents were under the age of 18; 5.7% were between the ages of 18 and 24; 21.5% were from 25 to 44; 27.2% were from 45 to 64; and 27.9% were 65 years of age or older. The gender makeup of the city was 49.5% male and 50.5% female.

=== 2000 census ===
As of the census of 2000, there were 754 people, 327 households, and 205 families living in the city. The population density was 858.3 inhabitants per square mile (331.4/km^{2}). There were 357 housing units at an average density of 406.4 per square mile (156.9/km^{2}). The racial makeup of the city was 99.87% White and 0.13% African American.

There were 327 households, out of which 23.9% had children under the age of 18 living with them, 50.2% were married couples living together, 7.6% had a female householder with no husband present, and 37.3% were non-families. 32.1% of all households were made up of individuals, and 21.7% had someone living alone who was 65 years of age or older. The average household size was 2.19 and the average family size was 2.72.

In the city, the population was spread out, with 19.9% under the age of 18, 5.6% from 18 to 24, 21.5% from 25 to 44, 24.8% from 45 to 64, and 28.2% who were 65 years of age or older. The median age was 47 years. For every 100 females, there were 99.5 males. For every 100 females age 18 and over, there were 92.4 males.

The median income for a household in the city was $35,694, and the median income for a family was $44,107. Males had a median income of $27,000 versus $20,227 for females. The per capita income for the city was $20,964. About 2.4% of families and 9.3% of the population were below the poverty line, including 3.8% of those under age 18 and 7.6% of those age 65 or over.

Buildings in downtown Garnavillo

== Economy ==
Garnavillo is the headquarter of Pattison sand company, which has been working a sand mine of the St. Peter Sandstone since 1983. In 2007 it reopened to produce limestone aggregates, and silica proppants, otherwise known as frac sand. With the fracking boom, the company increased their fleet to more than 500 rail cars in 2015. The company has repeatedly been in the news because of excessive water usage.

== Education ==
Public schools are operated by the Clayton Ridge Community School District, which formed in 2005 in the merger of the Guttenberg Community School District and the Garnavillo Community School District.

== Notable people ==
- Marion Murdoch (1849-1943) First woman in America to receive the degree of Bachelor of Divinity.
