= Charles Kostboth =

American politician

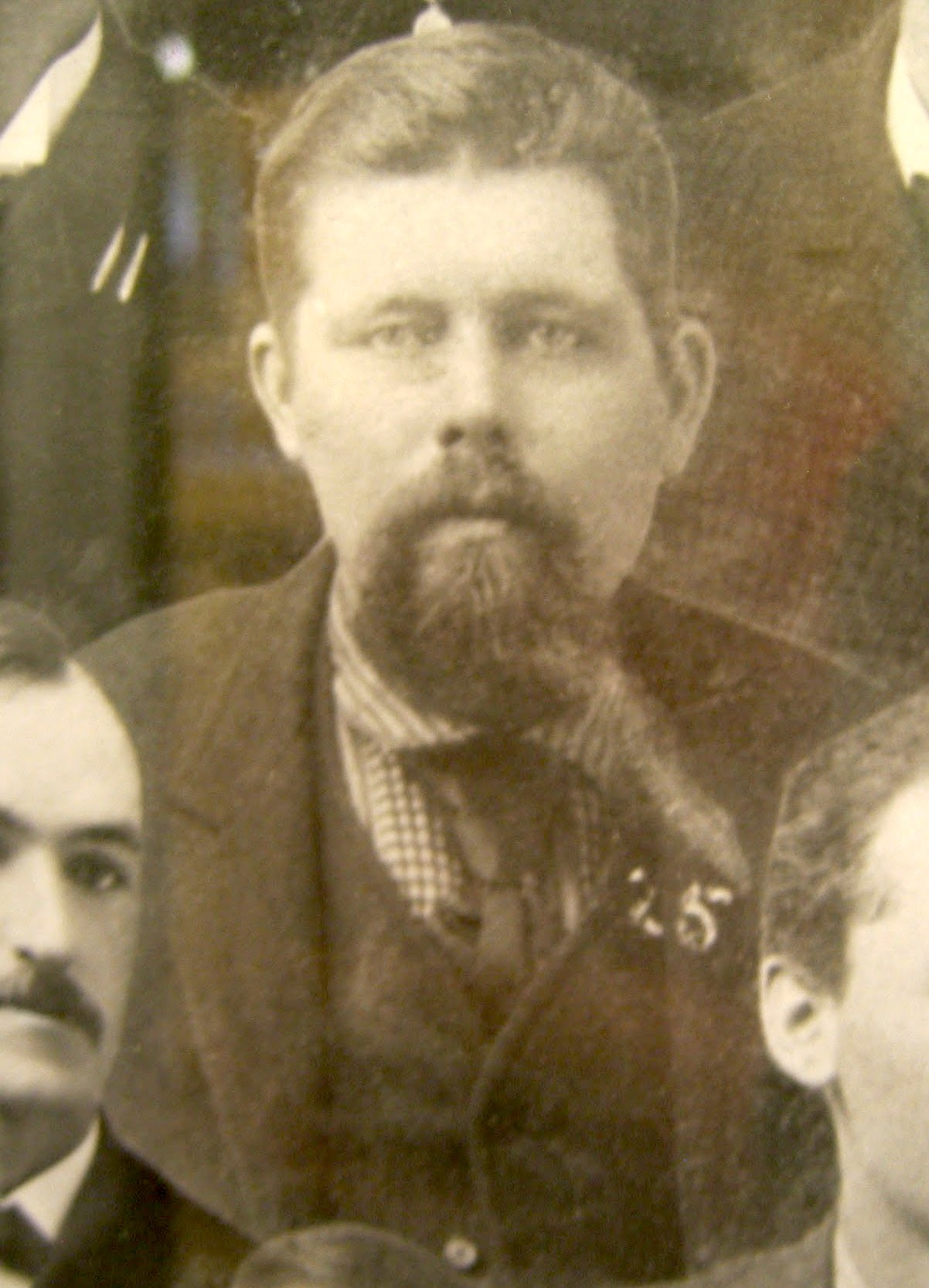
- Charles Kostboth as a South Dakota state representative in 1893

Member of the South Dakota House of Representatives from the 11th district
- In office 1893–1894

Personal details
- Born: April 27, 1853 Prussia, Germany
- Died: January 8, 1923 (aged 69) Canistota, South Dakota
- Party: Republican
- Spouse(s): Catherine (or Anna Catherine, or Katharina) Metzger (m. 1877)
- Children: Three daughters; five sons; a ninth child died in infancy
- Occupation: Farmer, banker, politician

Charles Kostboth (1853 – 1923) was a legislator in the 3rd South Dakota House of Representatives session from 1893 to 1894. He represented McCook County, South Dakota, then in the 11th District.

Charles was born to Wilhelm Kostboth and Maria Sophia Dorothea Muller in Prussia (now Germany). The 12-year-old Kostboth came to the United States from Germany with his parents in April 1865, through the port of New York City. They lived on a farm near McGregor, Iowa. Charles married Catherine Metzger on September 27, 1877, near her home in Clayton Center, Iowa. They moved to South Dakota two years later, claiming a homestead five miles northwest of Canistota, on the west half of section 17. Charles's parents also moved to Canistota, and his father died at Charles's farmhouse in 1900.

The couple lived as pioneers on the sparse Dakota prairie where, as Charles' obituary notes, "even claim shanties were few and far between." Charles became an American citizen by appearing at the U.S. District Court in the second district of Dakota Territory before Judge AJ Edgerton on November 14, 1883, where Kostboth "renounced allegiance to the Emperor of Germany [sic]." While on the homestead, Charles was active in public matters and held township and school offices. A doctor came from Sioux City, Iowa, and successfully performed an appendectomy on Charles who lay on the farm kitchen table. Kostboth increased the size of his farm and became one of the wealthier members of the Canistota community. He was known for his charity and generosity.

Charles, Catherine, and eight children lived on the homestead until 1912, when they moved to the town of Canistota. Kostboth was a founding member of German Lutheran Church (now Zion Lutheran Church) in Canistota. At the end of his life, Charles was president of Citizens State Bank in Canistota and Dakota State Bank in Salem, as well as treasurer of two grain elevator companies.

Kostboth suffered two partial paralytic strokes, three years and one year before his death in 1923. His cause of death was listed as senility, with secondary contributions from "chronic nephritis and hardening of the arteries", which were complications from an illness contracted around 1914. Charles Kostboth was buried on January 11, 1923, in the Canistota cemetery.

== Gallery ==
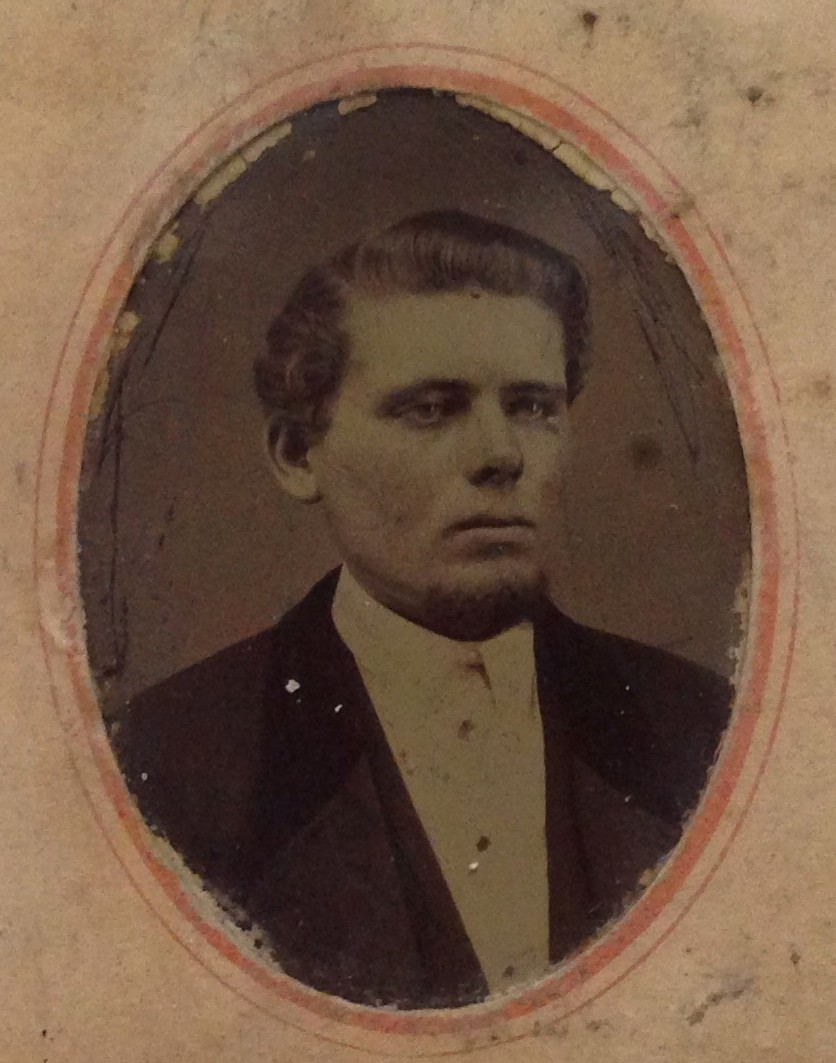
In mid-life

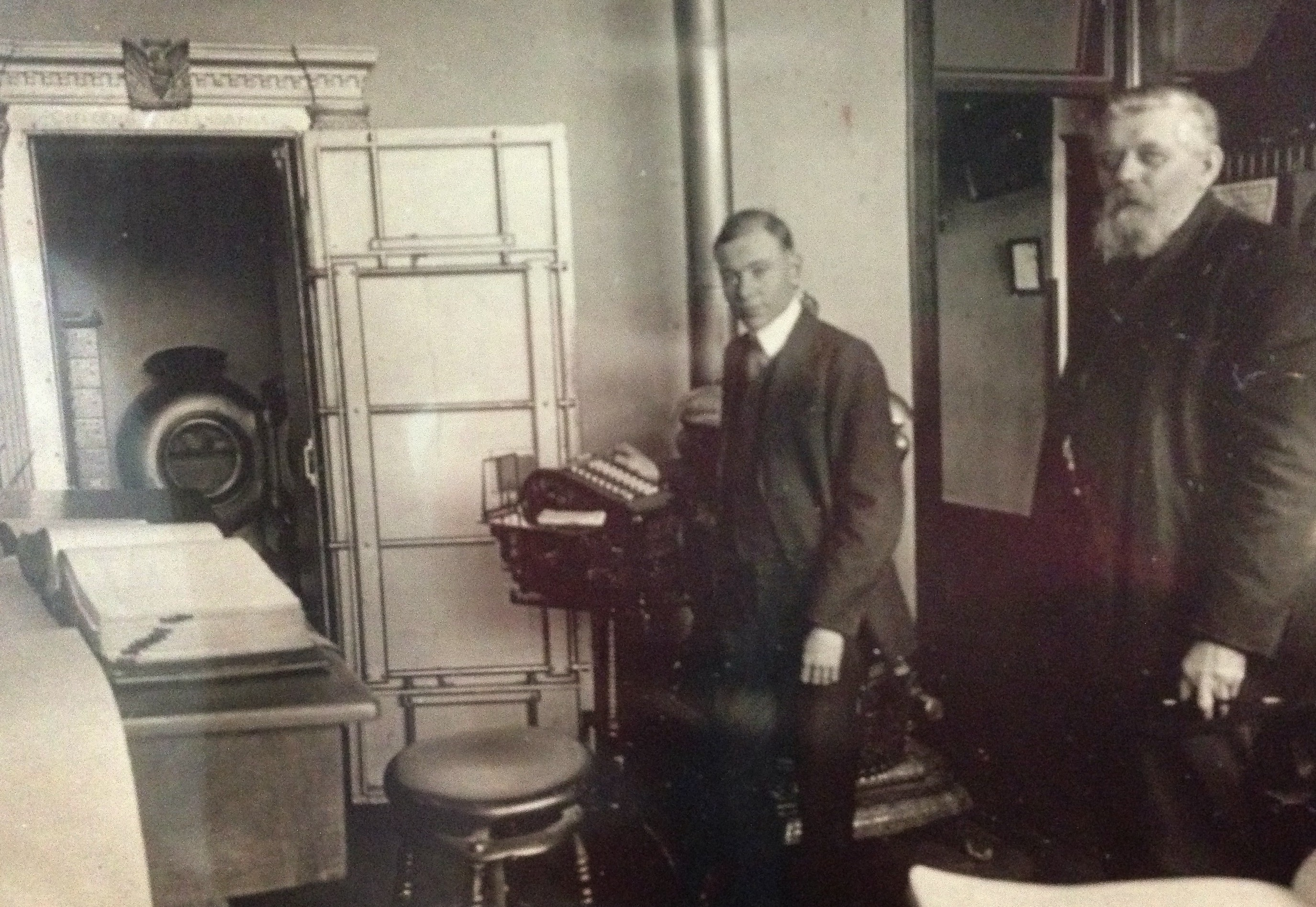
At his bank (at right)

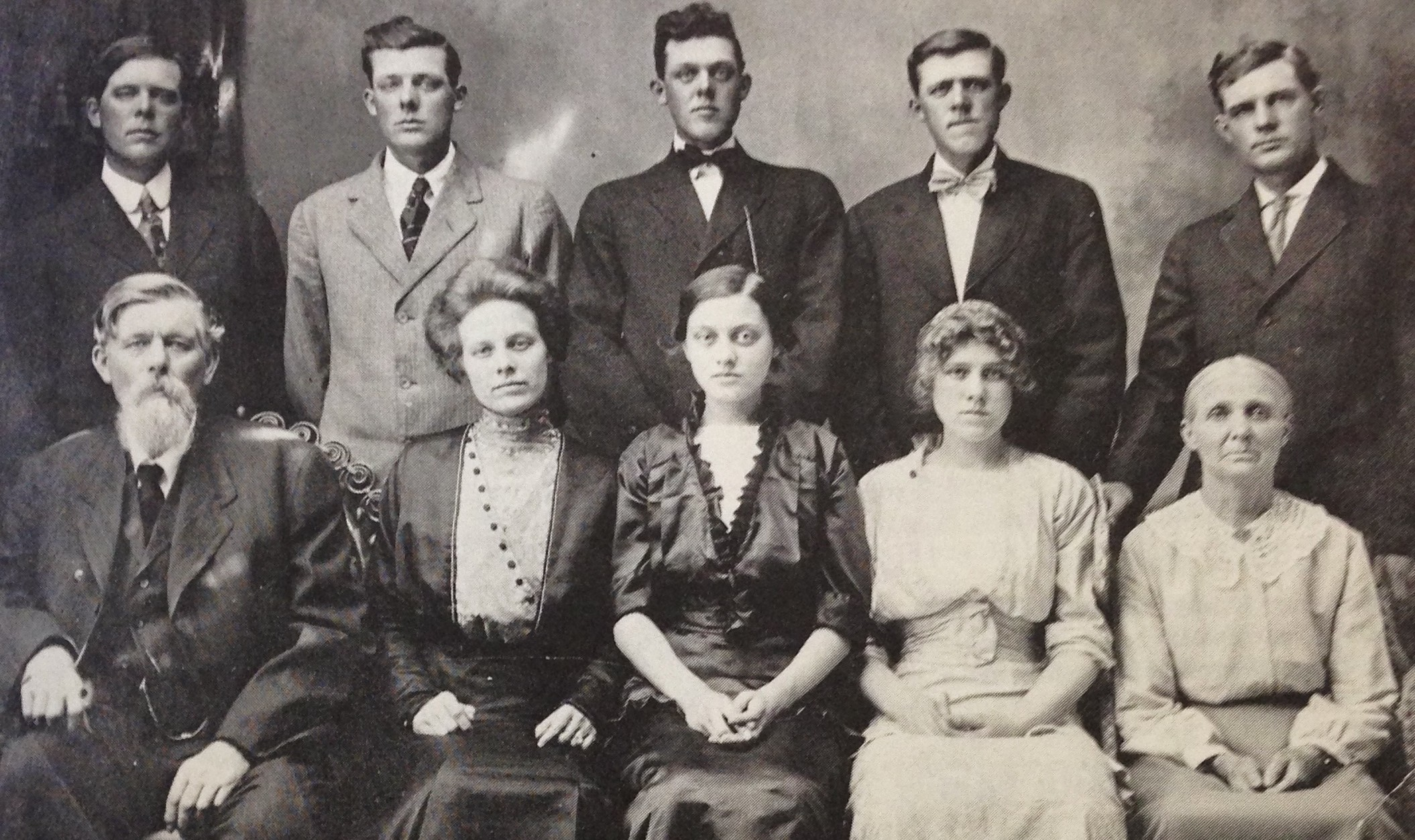
Charles (front left), Catherine, and children

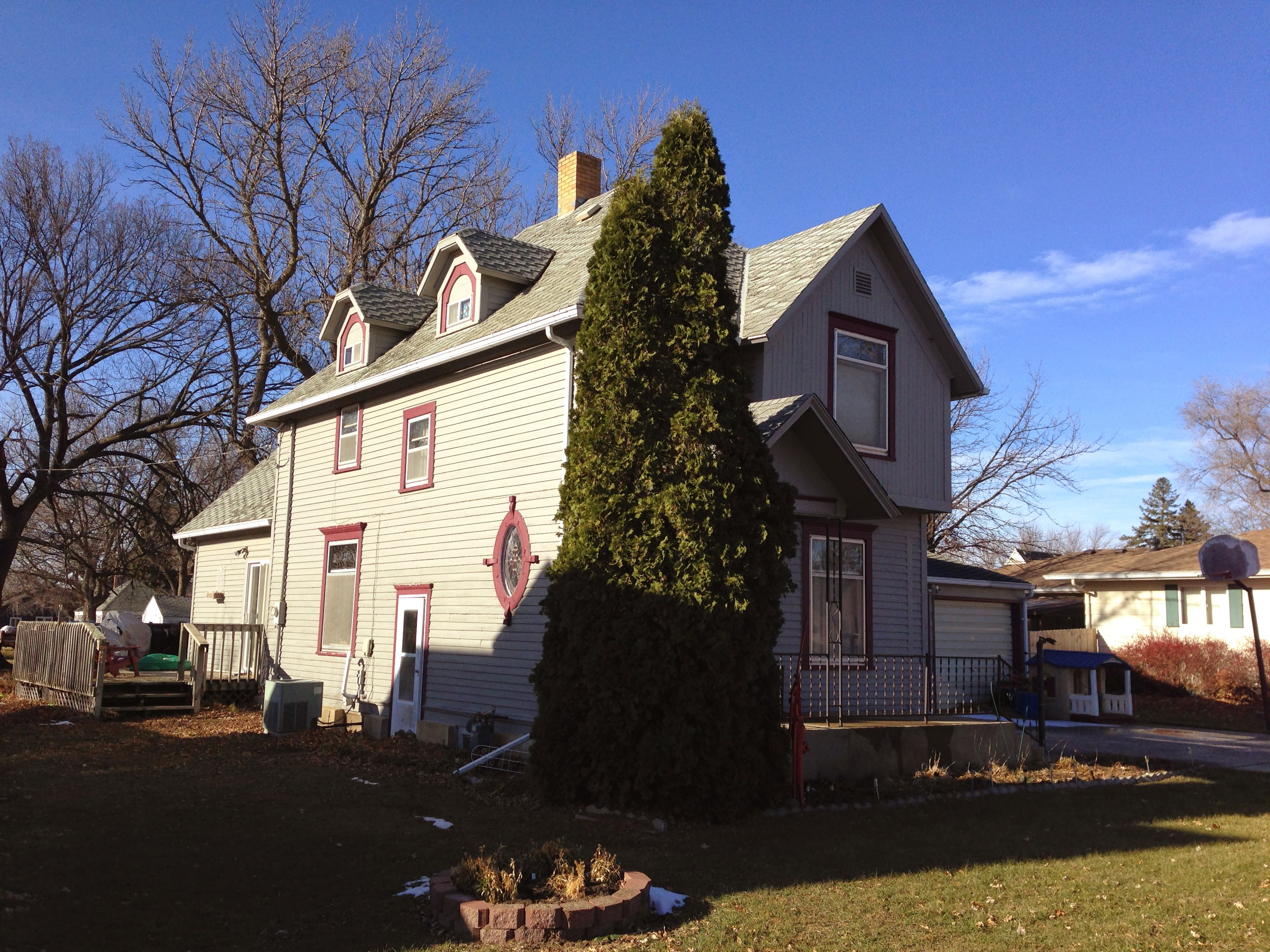
Charles's home in Canistota

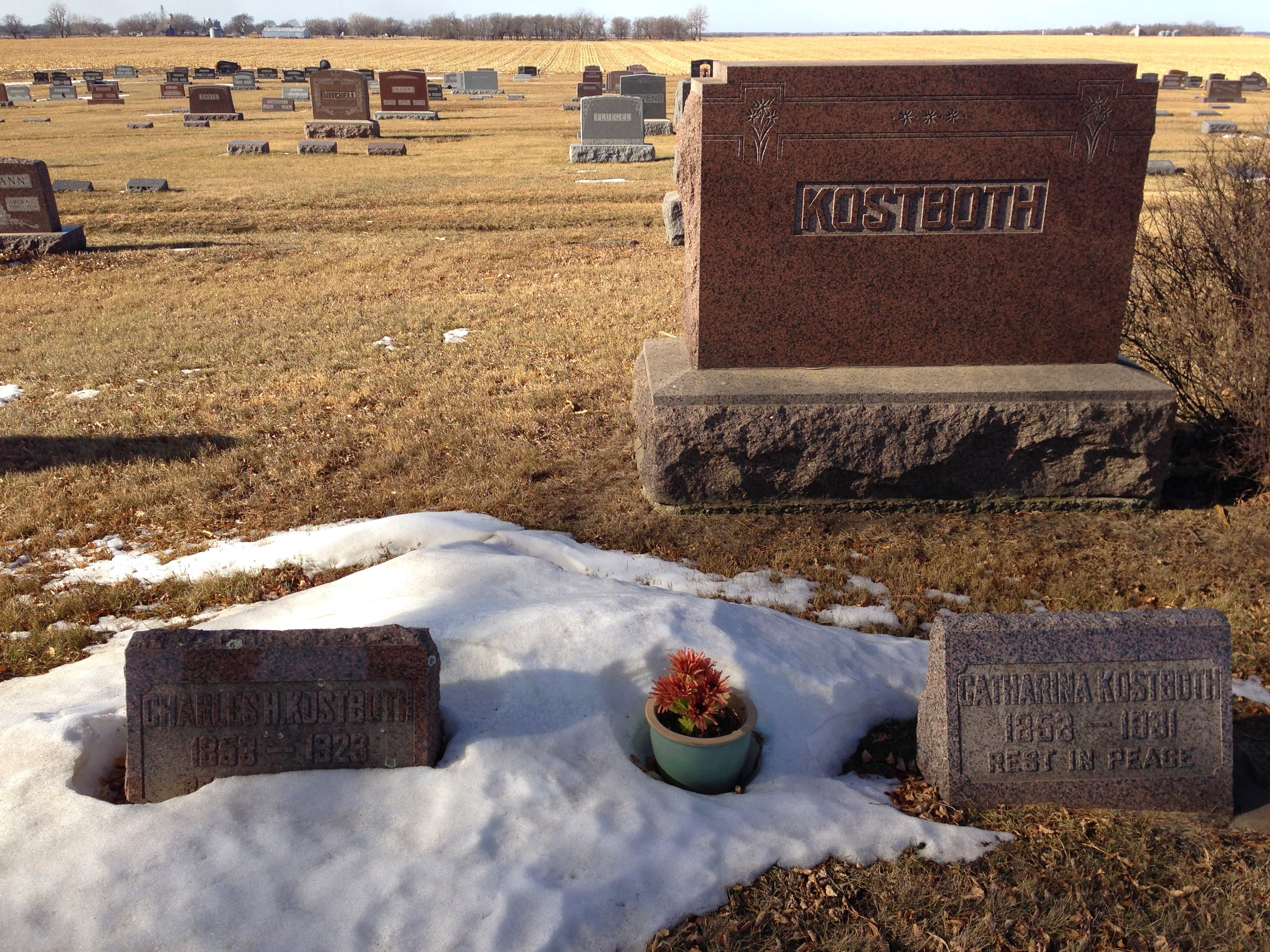
Grave of Charles Kostboth in Canistota Cemetery
