= Clayton School (Clayton, Iowa) =

Historic building in Iowa, United States

- U.S. National Register of Historic Places
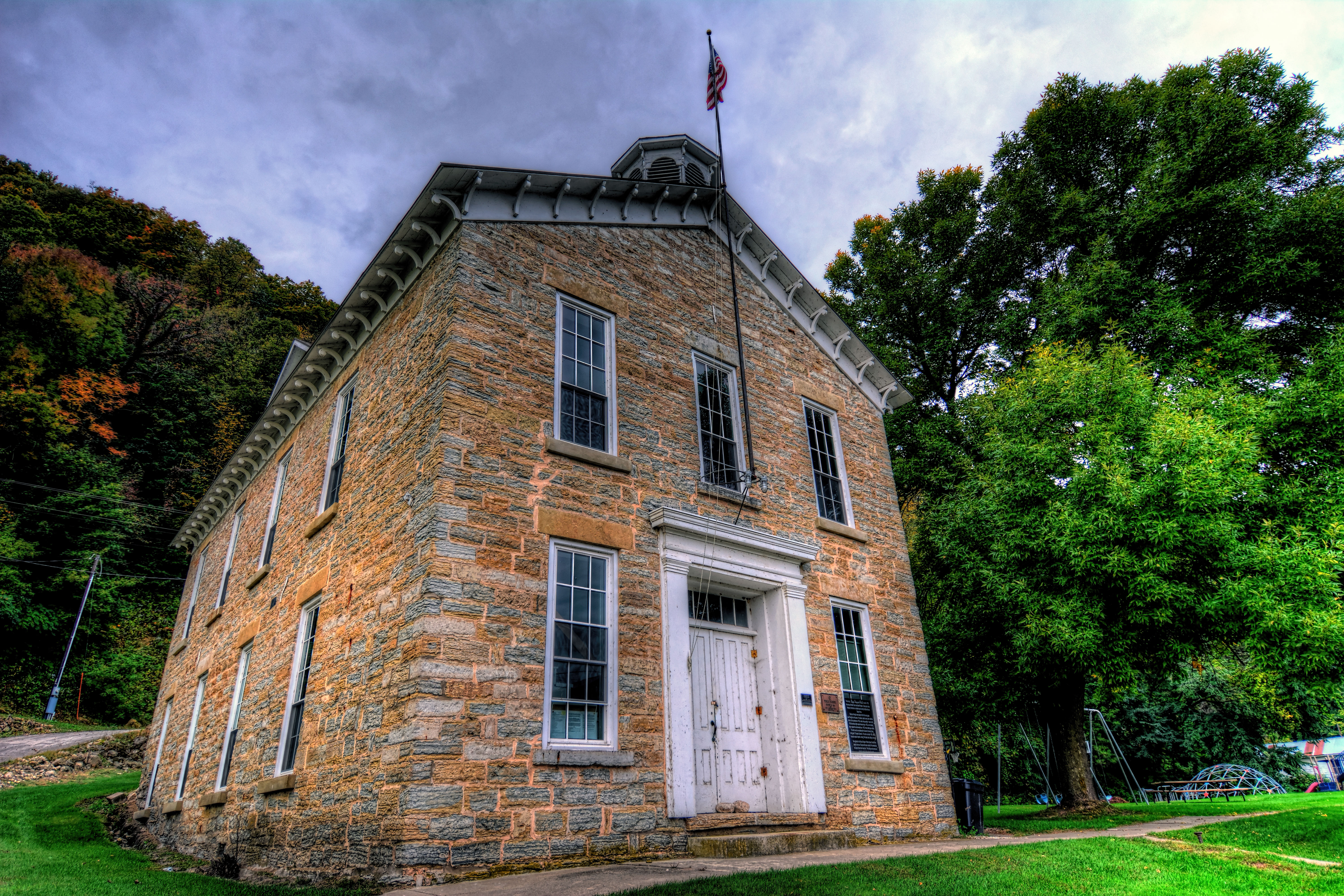

- Location within Iowa Location within the United States
- Location: 1st St. Clayton, Iowa
- Coordinates: 42°54′09.3″N 91°08′45.8″W
- Built: 1860
- NRHP reference No.: 74000778
- Added to NRHP: July 30, 1974

The Clayton School is a historic structure located in Clayton, Iowa, United States. The two-story structure, composed of native limestone, reflects the prosperity of the mid-19th century when it was built. It served as a school building into the late 20th century when the district consolidated with a neighboring school district because of declining enrollment. The building went on to serve as a city hall and community center. Completed in 1860, the rectangular building features bracketed eaves, and a gabled roof that is capped with dormers and an octagon-shaped cupola. It was listed on the National Register of Historic Places in 1974.
