= Platteville Limestone =

Geologic formation in the United States

- Stratigraphic range: Ordovician
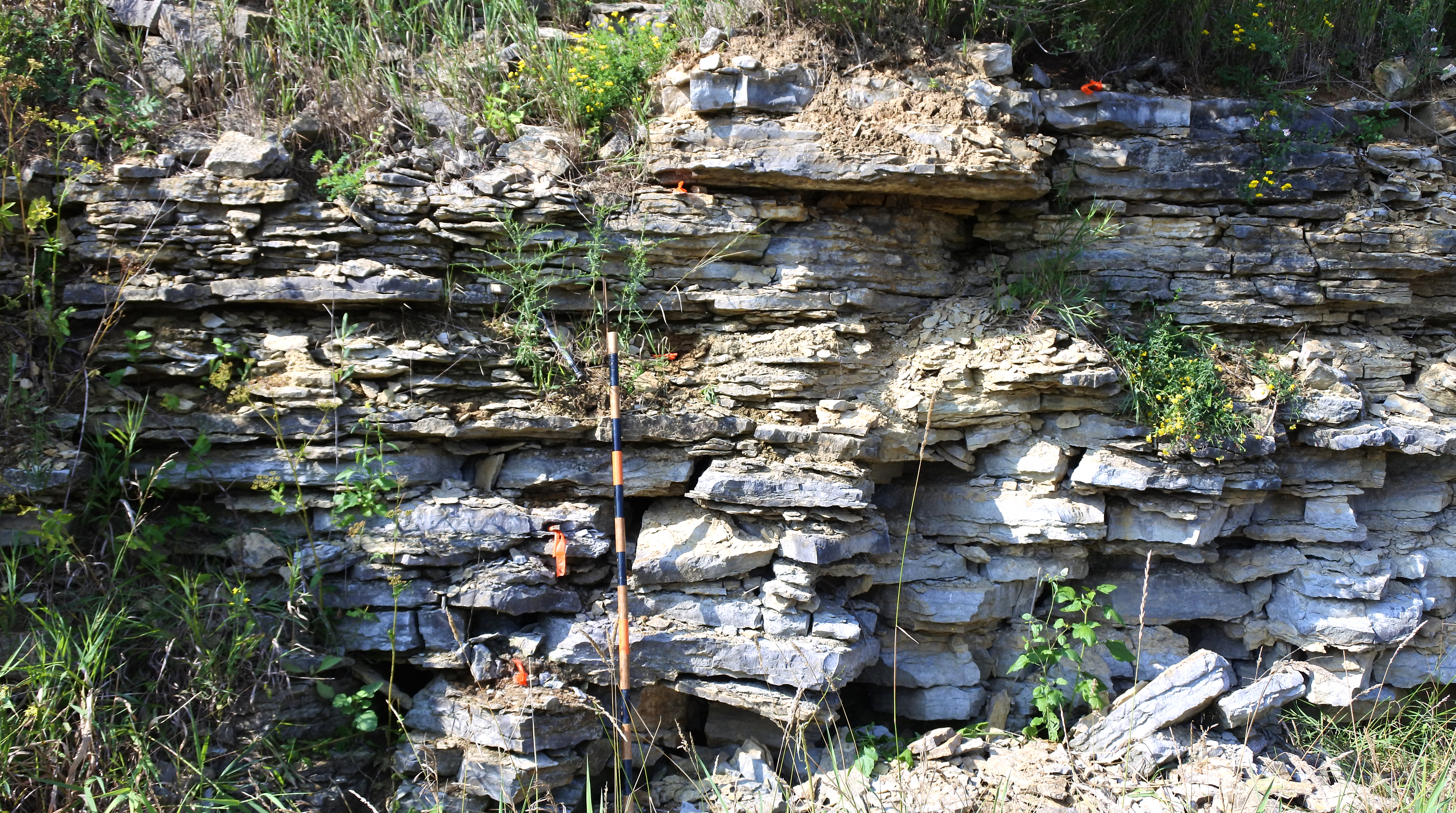
- Platteville Limestone exposed in Decorah, Iowa
- Type: Formation
- Underlies: Decorah Shale
- Overlies: Glenwood Formation

Location
- Country: United States
- Extent: Upper Midwest

The Platteville Limestone is the Ordovician limestone formation in the sedimentary sequence characteristic of the upper Midwestern United States. It is characterized by its gray color, rough texture, and numerous fossils. Its type locality is Platteville, Wisconsin. It was heavily used in the early decades of the building of Minneapolis–Saint Paul and Faribault, Minnesota.

In Illinois, the formation is elevated to group status and referred to as the Platteville Group.

== Formation ==
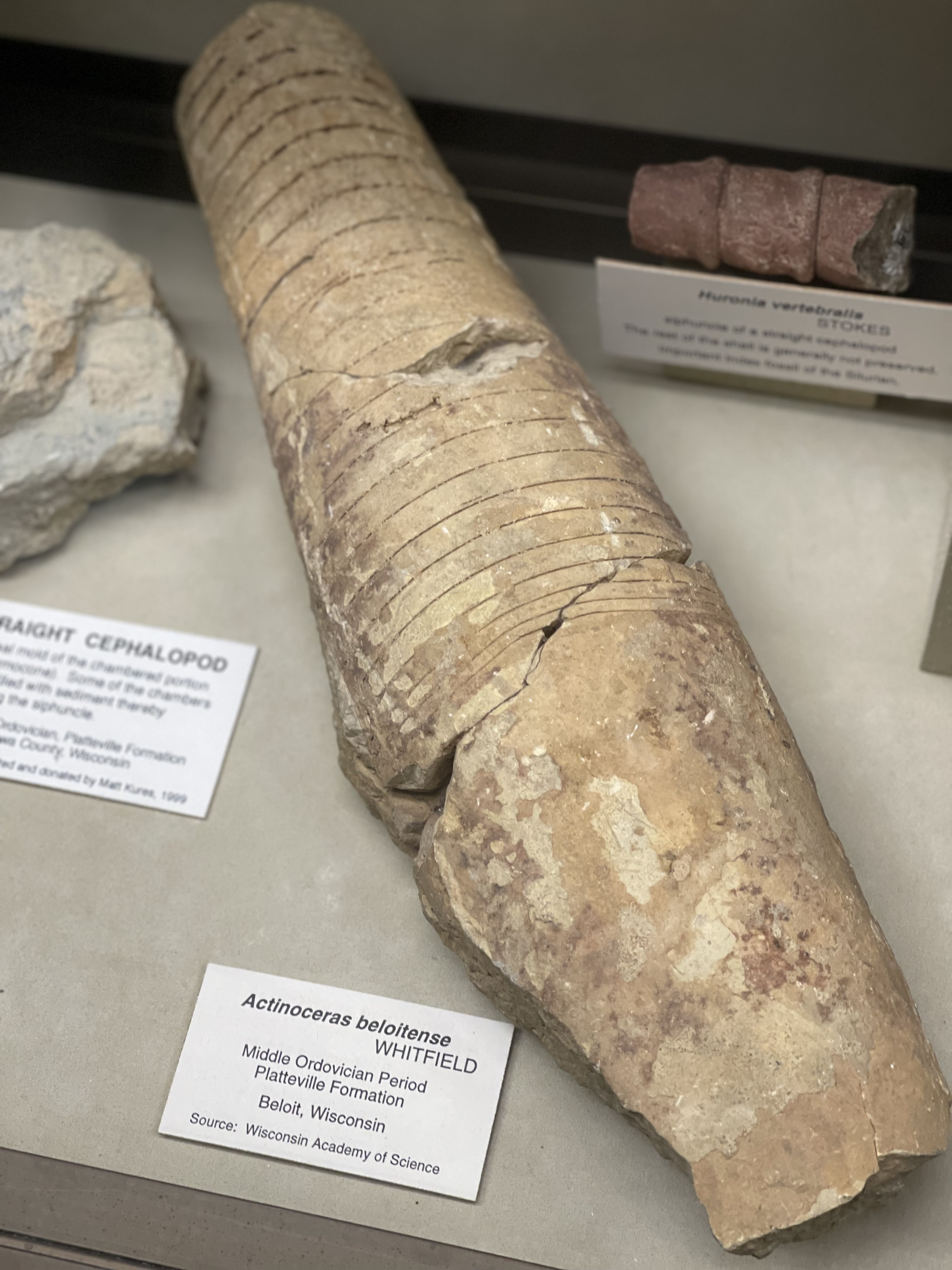
This shell from the limestone is the holotype specimen of the nautiloid Actinoceras beloitense

Like almost all limestones, the Platteville variety is a marine creation. Platteville Limestone formed between 488 and 436 million years ago, when what became southeastern Minnesota and southwestern Wisconsin lay beneath an ancient sea. This sea was heavily populated by shellfish and other invertebrates. As they died, their shells and other hard parts, made of calcium carbonate, fell to the ocean floor. Over the centuries, the weight of these deposits crushed the shell fragments and compressed them into stone.

It overlies the thin Glenwood Shale, which overlies the thick St. Peter Sandstone. It is shot through with dolomitic mottles in an anastomose pattern; this dolomitization occurred after deposition but prior to the development of joints in the rock.

About 100 million years later, geologic forces raised southeastern Minnesota above the ocean surface. In the area that became Twin Cities metropolitan region, the limestone was covered by thin deposits of shale and soil. Glaciers covered this region from 75,000 to about 12,000 years ago. When they finally melted, between 14,000 and 12,000 years ago, the released water carved the channels of the Mississippi, Minnesota, and smaller rivers through the layers of limestone, exposing some of it.

This difficult-to-erode unit forms the cap of Saint Anthony Falls, Minnehaha Falls, and the Mississippi River bluffs in most of the Twin Cities area. Sea life was abundant during the Ordovician Period and a large number of marine fossils including corals, bryozoans, brachiopods, clams, snails, cephalopods, and trilobites can be found in the limestone sediments at several areas along the Mississippi River in the Twin Cities.

== Use ==
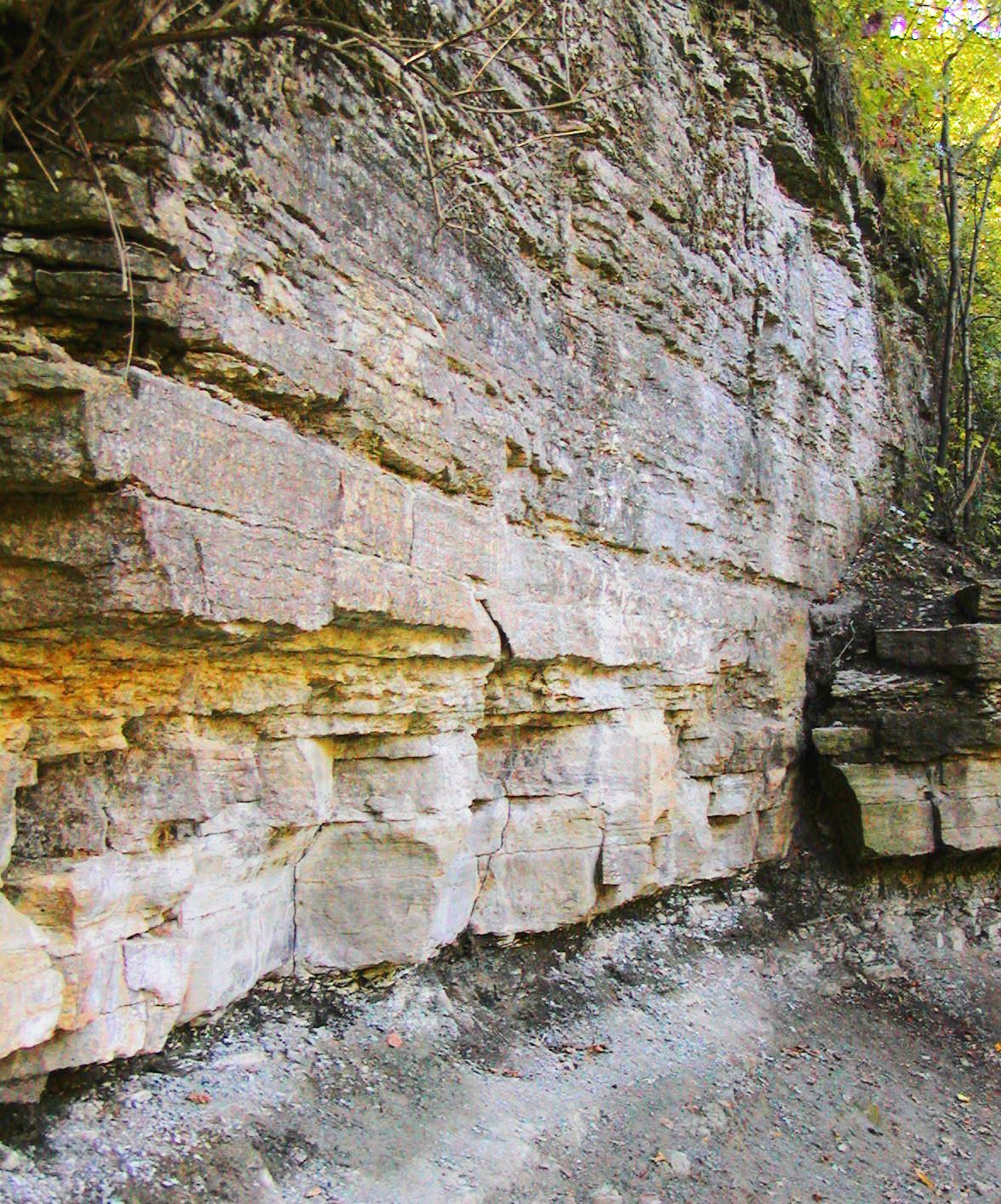
The Platteville Limestone cropping out in Minnehaha Park, Minneapolis. The Platteville Limestone is the less-eroded, layered unit that constitutes the majority of the photo. Below it is a thin, dark layer of Glenwood Shale. Below the shale is a thin, white stripe of St. Peter Sandstone, followed by a slope of eroded St. Peter Sandstone material.

When the United States Army began work on Fort Snelling in 1820, Platteville Limestone was abundant and nearby. The fort site lay atop a great deposit of the material. It is an easy stone to quarry, as it breaks readily. Soldiers built almost the entire original fort, from foundations to the round tower, out of Platteville stone. It remains the largest complex of Platteville structures ever made.

Like Fort Snelling, downtown Saint Paul was built atop a Platteville shelf. Once the city moved beyond its early stage of flimsy and flammable wooden buildings, the local limestone came into heavy use. The first quarry went into operation in 1856. The Original Coney Island (1858), the Alexander Ramsey House (1868), and Church of the Assumption (1874) were all built partly or entirely from the local stone. Several fine examples of Platteville limestone's use in private houses can be found in Saint Paul's Summit Hill district, including the Burbank–Livingston–Griggs House (1862).

The Platteville stone was quarried and used also in Minneapolis, though less of it survived there into the 21st century. Quarrying began in 1864 and builders used it for the original Customs House and City Hall (both 1873) and the original Central High School (1878). The most conspicuous survivor is the Pillsbury A-Mill building, built in 1881; its walls all Platteville stone quarried on site.

Outside of the Twin Cities, Carleton College's first permanent building, Willis Hall (1872), was built of Platteville stone quarried at Dundas, Minnesota. In Faribault, the Cathedral of Our Merciful Saviour and Bethlehem Academy and most of the main buildings of Shattuck-Saint Mary's were also made of Platteville. (The stone in this area tends to be a paler gray, often stained with light brown patches.)

As a building stone, Platteville's chief attraction was its availability; in Saint Paul and Minneapolis it was often simply quarried on site. But it had limits. Coarse and crumbly, it could not be carved or polished to a smooth finish, and its gray color had limited appeal. With the spread of railroads in the 1870s, other, finer materials became available and affordable, including the red Lake Superior Sandstone and the buff-colored Kasota limestone that were more attractive and easier to work with. Builders rarely used Platteville for major projects after the 1880s.
