= Clayton Ridge Community School District =

Public school district in Guttenberg, Iowa, United States

Location
- Guttenberg, Iowa Clayton County United States
- Coordinates: 42.78525°N 91.0965°W

District information
- Type: Local school district
- Grades: K-12
- Established: 2005
- Superintendent: Shane Wahls
- Schools: 4
- Budget: $15,224,000 (2020-21)
- NCES District ID: 1913350

Students and staff
- Students: 1485 (2022-23)
- Teachers: 44.45 FTE
- Staff: 48.74 FTE
- Student–teacher ratio: 33.41
- Athletic conference: Upper Iowa
- District mascot: Eagles
- Colors: Green, Black, and Silver

Other information
- Website: www.claytonridge.k12.ia.us

Clayton Ridge Community School District is a rural public school district in Clayton County, Iowa, serving Guttenberg, Garnavillo, Clayton, North Buena Vista, and Osterdock. In addition, Clayton Center is zoned to Clayton Ridge schools, as well as areas around Garber. The school mascot is the Eagles, and the colors are green, black and silver.

== History ==
It was established on July 1, 2005, by the merger of the Guttenberg Community School District and the Garnavillo Community School District. The merger was approved in a September 14, 2004 election, with Guttenberg district voters approving it 396–19, and Garnavillo district voters approving it 188–20. The two pre-merger districts began sharing athletic teams in 2000 and whole-grade-sharing (in which students from one district attend another district's schools for a particular grade level) in 2001.

Allan Nelson began serving of the superintendent of the district upon its legal creation in 2005; he was the joint superintendent of the two pre-merger districts beginning on July 1, 2002, when they were still grade-sharing. Nelson retired on June 30, 2015.

== Schools ==
- Clayton Ridge High School (Guttenberg)
- Clayton Ridge Middle School (Guttenberg)
- Clayton Ridge Elementary School (Garnavillo)
- Clayton Ridge Preschool (Garnavillo)

Previously elementary school grades were in Guttenberg and middle school grades were in Garnavillo, but in 2016 the district began changing the configurations. Grades 4 and 8 were moved to Garnavillo and Guttenberg, respectively, that year. In 2018 the remaining middle school grades went to Guttenberg while the remaining elementary school grades went to Garnavillo.

=== Clayton Ridge High School ===
==== Athletics ====
The Eagles compete in the Upper Iowa Conference in the following sports:

- Cross Country
- Volleyball
- Football
- Basketball
- Track and Field
- Golf
- Baseball
- Softball

== See also ==
- List of school districts in Iowa
- List of high schools in Iowa
