= Clayton, Iowa =

- City
- Location of Clayton, Iowa
- Coordinates: 42°54′08″N 91°08′58″W
- Country: United States
- State: Iowa
- County: Clayton

Area
  - Total: 0.51 sq mi (1.33 km^{2})
  - Land: 0.51 sq mi (1.33 km^{2})
  - Water: 0 sq mi (0.00 km^{2})
- Elevation: 663 ft (202 m)

Population (2020)
  - Total: 45
  - Density: 87.6/sq mi (33.83/km^{2})
- Time zone: UTC-6 (Central (CST))
  - Summer (DST): UTC-5 (CDT)
- ZIP code: 52049
- Area code: 563
- FIPS code: 19-13845
- GNIS feature ID: 2393547
- Website: www.cityofclaytoniowa.com

Clayton is a city in Clayton County, Iowa, United States. The population was 45 at the 2020 census, down from 55 in 2000. Clayton is located adjacent to the Mississippi River and is only accessible via a steep road.

== History ==
Clayton was founded in 1849.

== Geography ==
According to the United States Census Bureau, the city has a total area of 0.49 square miles (1.27 km^{2}), all land.

== Demographics ==
Historical populations
Year	Pop.	±%
1880	383	—
1890	342	−10.7%
1900	205	−40.1%
1910	145	−29.3%
1920	170	+17.2%
1930	162	−4.7%
1940	161	−0.6%
1950	136	−15.5%
1960	130	−4.4%
1970	113	−13.1%
1980	68	−39.8%
1990	41	−39.7%
2000	55	+34.1%
2010	43	−21.8%
2020	45	+4.7%
Source:"U.S. Census website". United States Census Bureau. and Iowa Data Center; Source: U.S. Decennial Census

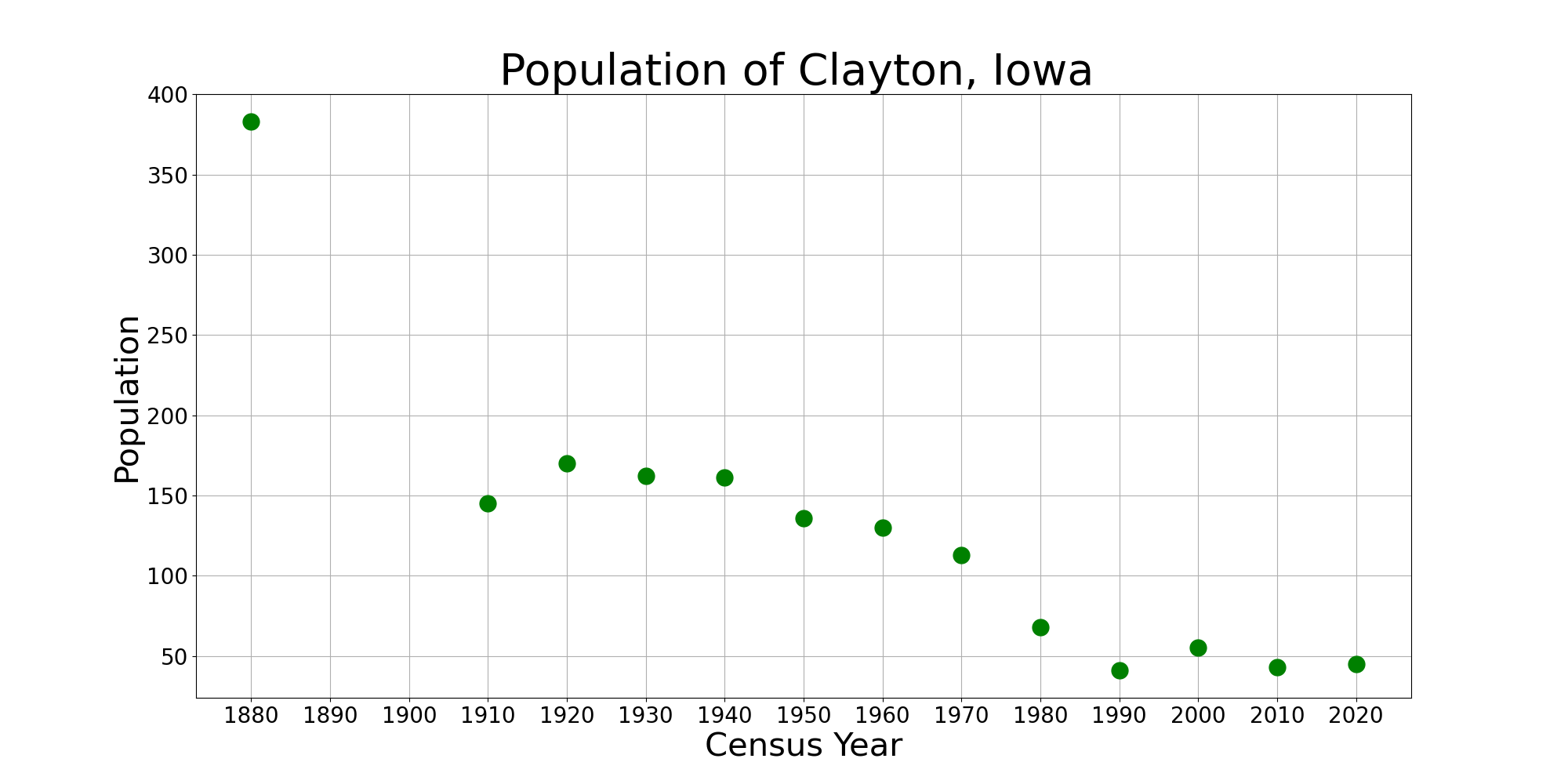
The population of Clayton, Iowa from US census data

=== 2020 census ===
As of the census of 2020, there were 45 people, 30 households, and 18 families residing in the city. The population density was 87.6 inhabitants per square mile (33.8/km^{2}). There were 70 housing units at an average density of 136.3 per square mile (52.6/km^{2}). The racial makeup of the city was 97.8% White, 0.0% Black or African American, 0.0% Native American, 0.0% Asian, 0.0% Pacific Islander, 0.0% from other races and 2.2% from two or more races. Hispanic or Latino persons of any race comprised 2.2% of the population.

Of the 30 households, 20.0% of which had children under the age of 18 living with them, 33.3% were married couples living together, 10.0% were cohabitating couples, 26.7% had a female householder with no spouse or partner present and 30.0% had a male householder with no spouse or partner present. 40.0% of all households were non-families. 26.7% of all households were made up of individuals, 3.3% had someone living alone who was 65 years old or older.

The median age in the city was 61.5 years. 2.2% of the residents were under the age of 20; 2.2% were between the ages of 20 and 24; 15.6% were from 25 and 44; 37.8% were from 45 and 64; and 42.2% were 65 years of age or older. The gender makeup of the city was 51.1% male and 48.9% female.

=== 2010 census ===
As of the census of 2010, there were 43 people, 28 households, and 14 families living in the city. The population density was 87.8 inhabitants per square mile (33.9/km^{2}). There were 84 housing units at an average density of 171.4 per square mile (66.2/km^{2}). The racial makeup of the city was 100.0% White.

There were 28 households, of which 3.6% had children under the age of 18 living with them, 42.9% were married couples living together, 7.1% had a male householder with no wife present, and 50.0% were non-families. 50.0% of all households were made up of individuals, and 14.2% had someone living alone who was 65 years of age or older. The average household size was 1.54 and the average family size was 2.07.

The median age in the city was 59.3 years. 2.3% of residents were under the age of 18; 0% were between the ages of 18 and 24; 13.9% were from 25 to 44; 51.2% were from 45 to 64; and 32.6% were 65 years of age or older. The gender makeup of the city was 46.5% male and 53.5% female.

=== 2000 census ===
As of the census of 2000, there were 55 people, 32 households, and 19 families living in the city. The population density was 99.8 inhabitants per square mile (38.5/km^{2}). There were 64 housing units at an average density of 116.2 per square mile (44.9/km^{2}). The racial makeup of the city was 100.00% White.

There were 32 households, out of which 9.4% had children under the age of 18 living with them, 53.1% were married couples living together, 3.1% had a female householder with no husband present, and 40.6% were non-families. 40.6% of all households were made up of individuals, and 21.9% had someone living alone who was 65 years of age or older. The average household size was 1.72 and the average family size was 2.11.

In the city, the population was spread out, with 5.5% under the age of 18, 1.8% from 18 to 24, 7.3% from 25 to 44, 56.4% from 45 to 64, and 29.1% who were 65 years of age or older. The median age was 56 years. For every 100 females, there were 89.7 males. For every 100 females age 18 and over, there were 92.6 males.

The median income for a household in the city was $31,250, and the median income for a family was $40,833. Males had a median income of $30,625 versus $40,625 for females. The per capita income for the city was $21,214. None of the population and none of the families were below the poverty line.

== Education ==
Public schools are operated by the Clayton Ridge Community School District, which formed in 2005 in the merger of the Guttenberg Community School District and the Garnavillo Community School District. Students were previously zoned to Garnavillo schools.

== Transportation ==
Passenger train service was provided to Clayton throughout its early history. Trains ran from La Crosse along the west bank of the Mississippi River through Clayton to Dubuque. This service gradually decreased in the first half of the twentieth century and was discontinued on June 8, 1951.
