= Clayton Center, Iowa =

- Unincorporated community
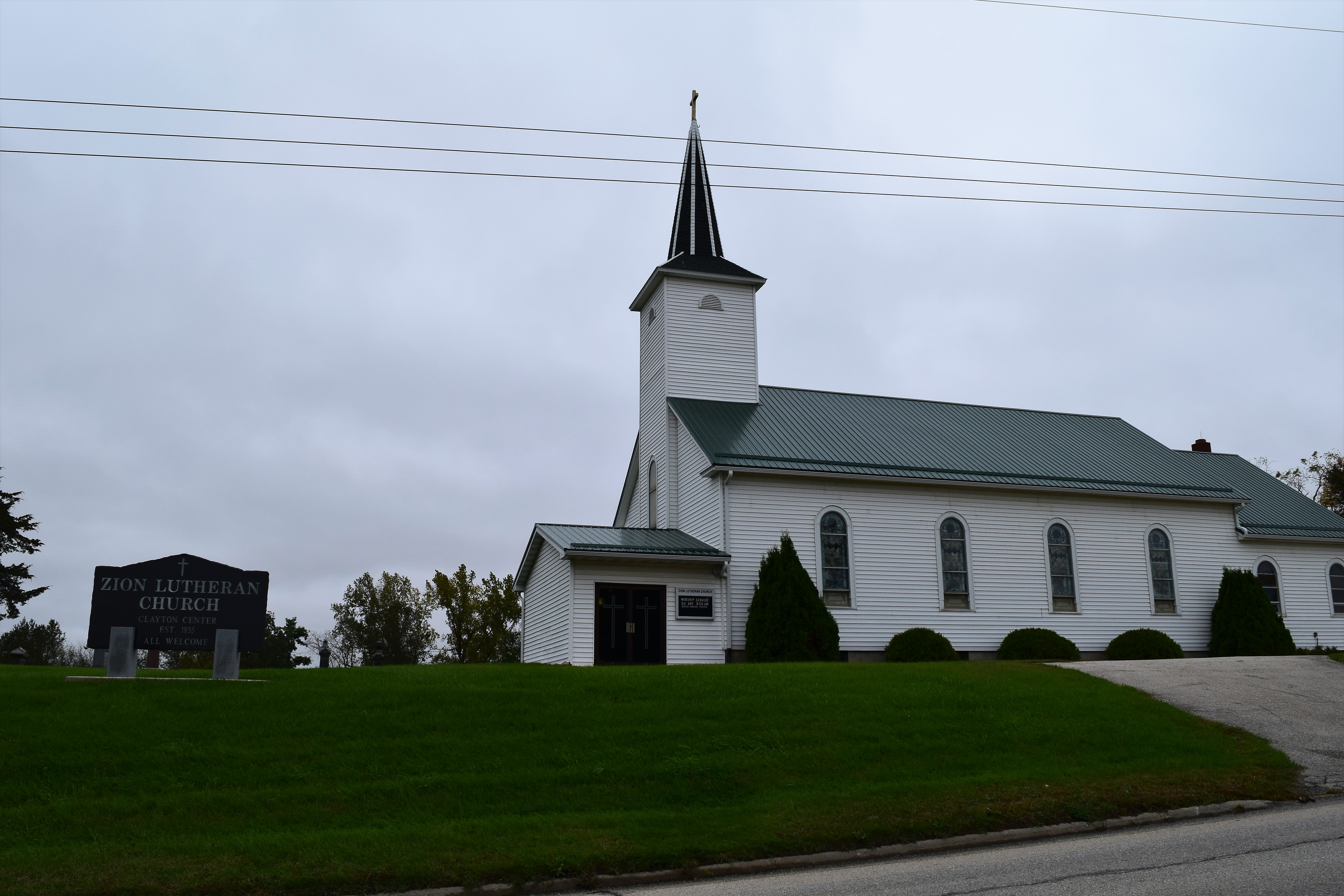
- Zion Lutheran Church in Clayton Center

- Location within Iowa Location within the United States
- Country: United States
- State: Iowa
- County: Clayton
- Elevation: 988 ft (301 m)
- Time zone: UTC-6 (Central (CST))
  - Summer (DST): UTC-5 (CDT)
- Area code: 563
- GNIS feature ID: 455451

Clayton Center is an unincorporated community located in Clayton County, Iowa, United States.

== History ==
The area was settled as a German colony, approximately five miles east of Elkader. In April 1856, the land was surveyed by Lewis Brockman, who established the location as the "southeast quarter of section 8, township 93 north, range 3 west." Clayton Center was then platted on June 27, 1857, by Fred Hartmann. Clayton Center's population was 94 in 1902. The population was 162 in 1940.

== Education ==
Public schools are operated by the Clayton Ridge Community School District, which formed in 2005 with the merger of the Guttenberg and Garnavillo Community School Districts. Students were previously zoned to Garnavillo schools.
