= Glenwood Shale =

Geologic formation in Minnesota, United States

- Stratigraphic range: Ordovician
- Type: Formation
- Underlies: Platteville Formation
- Overlies: St. Peter Sandstone

Location
- Country: United States
- Extent: Minnesota

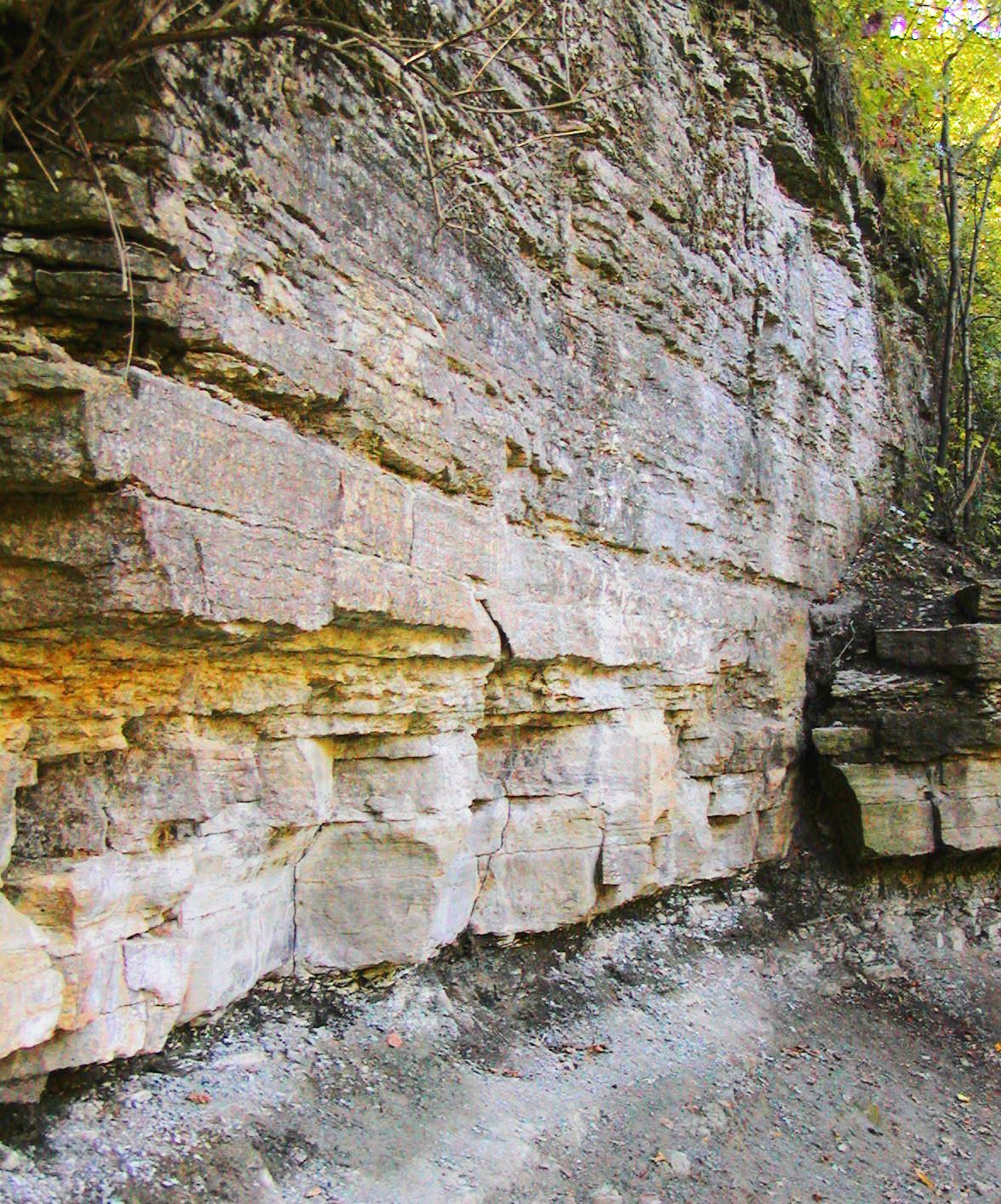
The Glenwood shale cropping out in Minneapolis, Minnesota. In this photo, it is the thin, darker layer that lies between the Platteville Limestone (above: the less-eroded, layered unit that constitutes the majority of the photo) and the St. Peter Sandstone (below: a thin, white stripe of in-place rock followed by a slope of eroded St. Peter Sandstone material).

The Glenwood Shale is a thin Ordivician shale formation in the sedimentary sequence characteristic of the upper Midwestern United States.

It lies under the Platteville Limestone and above the Saint Peter Sandstone. Together, these three units represent a sequence of sea level rise during Ordovician time. Because it is often very thin (~10 cm or less in the Twin Cities), it is often ignored in the general stratigraphy.
