= Pecatonica Formation =

Geologic formation in the United States

- Stratigraphic range: Ordovician
- Type: Formation
- Unit of: Black River Group
- Underlies: Plattin Formation
- Overlies: Joachim Dolomite

Lithology
- Primary: Limestone

Location
- Region: Illinois, Indiana, Iowa and Wisconsin
- Country: United States

The Pecatonica Formation is a geologic formation in Illinois. It preserves fossils dating back to the Ordovician period.

== See also ==
- List of fossiliferous stratigraphic units in Illinois
