= Garnavillo Community School District =

Former school district in Iowa

Garnavillo Community School District was a school district headquartered in Garnavillo, Iowa. In addition to Garnavillo it served Clayton, Buck Creek, Clayton Center, and National, as well as areas around Garber.

== History ==
The 1949 Garnavillo School Gymnasium

Education in the Garnavillo area began with a German Lutheran school established in 1844. In 1847 the State of Iowa mandated that communities establish schools if they had at least fifty families, and so Garnavillo established a public school. The Garnavillo public school received expansions after other districts consolidated into Garnavillo. A separate secondary school building opened in 1962.

In December 1999 the district and the Guttenberg Community School District agreed to begin whole-grade-sharing (in which students from one district attend another district's schools for a particular grade level) in 2001. The district began sharing athletic teams with Garnavillo in 2000. The whole grade-sharing began as scheduled in 2001. The districts combined their secondary schools, with the high school in Guttenberg and the middle school in Garnavillo. The two retained their respective elementary schools.

On September 14, 2004, an election on merging the two districts into one was held, with Guttenberg district voters approving it 396–19, and Garnavillo district voters approving it 188–20. The merger into the Clayton Ridge Community School District was effective July 1, 2005.
