= Plattin Limestone =

Geologic formation in the United States

- Stratigraphic range: Ordovician
- Type: Formation
- Unit of: Black River Group
- Underlies: Kimmswick Limestone, Kope Formation, Lexington Limestone, and Trenton Limestone
- Overlies: Joachim Dolomite and Pecatonica Formation
- Thickness: up to 250 feet in Arkansas

Lithology
- Primary: Limestone

Location
- Region: Arkansas, Illinois, Missouri
- Country: United States

Type section
- Named for: Plattin Creek, Jefferson County, Missouri
- Named by: Edward Oscar Ulrich

The Plattin Limestone is a Middle Ordovician geologic formation in Arkansas, Illinois, and Missouri. The name was first introduced in 1904 by Edward Oscar Ulrich in his study of the geology of Missouri. A type locality was designated at the mouth of the Plattin Creek in Jefferson County, Missouri, however a stratotype was not assigned. As of 2017, a reference section has not been designated. The name was introduced into Arkansas in 1927, replacing part of the, now abandoned, Izard Limestone.

== See also ==
- List of fossiliferous stratigraphic units in Arkansas
- Paleontology in Arkansas
