= Castle Rock State Park (Illinois) =

State park in Illinois, United States

- IUCN category III (natural monument or feature)
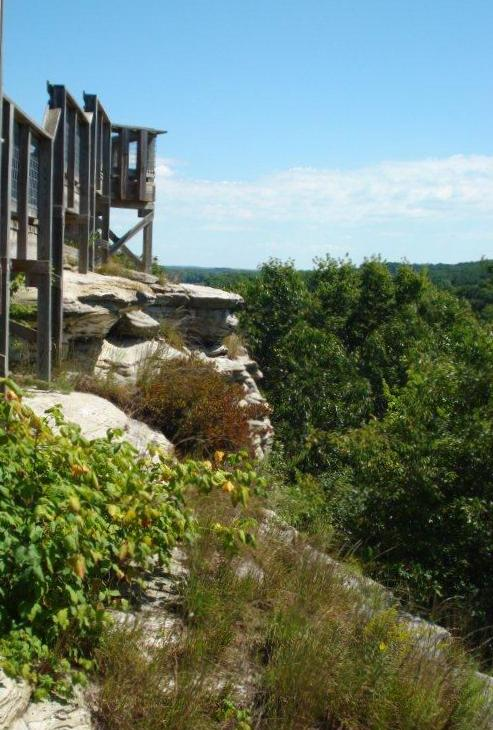

- Location within Illinois Location within the United States
- Location: Ogle County, Illinois, United States
- Nearest city: Oregon, Illinois
- Coordinates: 41°58′08″N 89°22′55″W
- Area: 2,000 acres (809 ha)
- Established: 1921
- Governing body: Illinois Department of Natural Resources

Castle Rock State Park is an Illinois state park on 2,000 acres (809 ha) in Ogle County, Illinois, United States. A portion of the land was acquired by the "Friends of Our Native Landscape" in 1921.

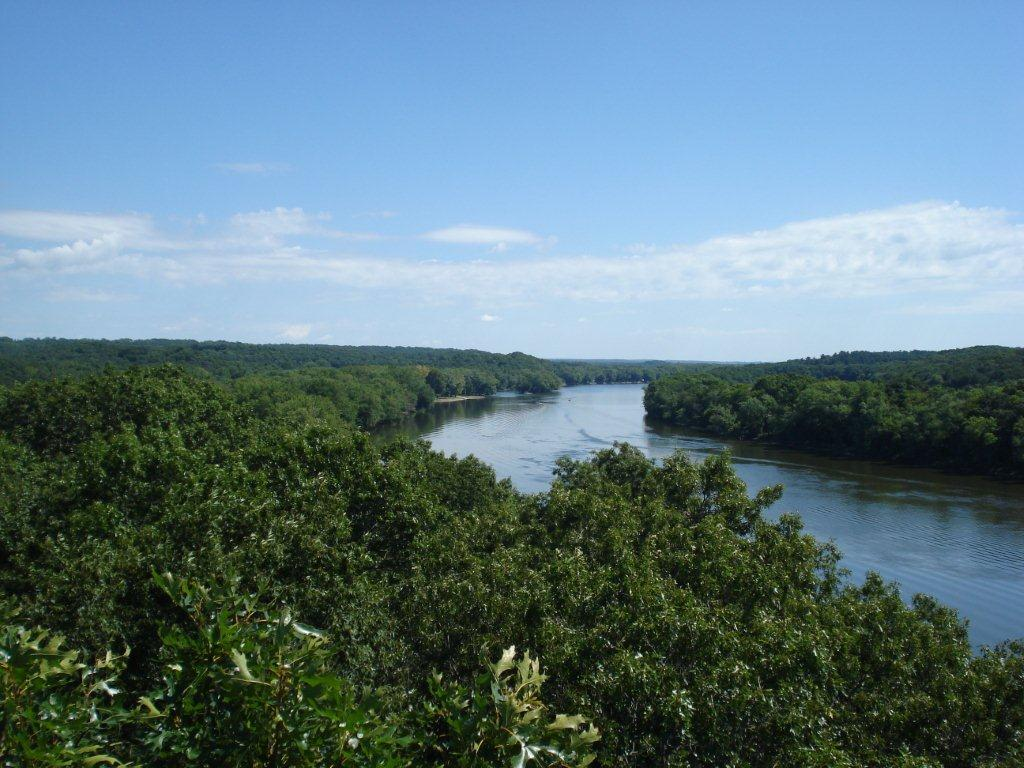
View of the Rock River from Castle Rock

== Geology ==
Castle Rock is a bluff of exposed St. Peter Sandstone from the Middle Ordovician period. Newly exposed sections are white quartz, while older areas have browner tints from the formation of limonite. The bluff is along the axis of the Sandwich Fault Zone, separating Ordovician exposures from those of the Cambrian period.

== 2008 closing ==
Castle Rock State Park was one of eleven state parks slated to close indefinitely on November 1, 2008, due to budget cuts by former Illinois governor Rod Blagojevich. After delay, which restored funding for some of the parks, a proposal to close seven state parks and a dozen state historic sites, including Castle Rock, went ahead on November 30, 2008. After the impeachment of Illinois Governor Blagojevich, new governor Pat Quinn reopened the closed state parks in February. In March 2009 Quinn announced he is committed to reopening the state historic sites by June 30, 2009.
