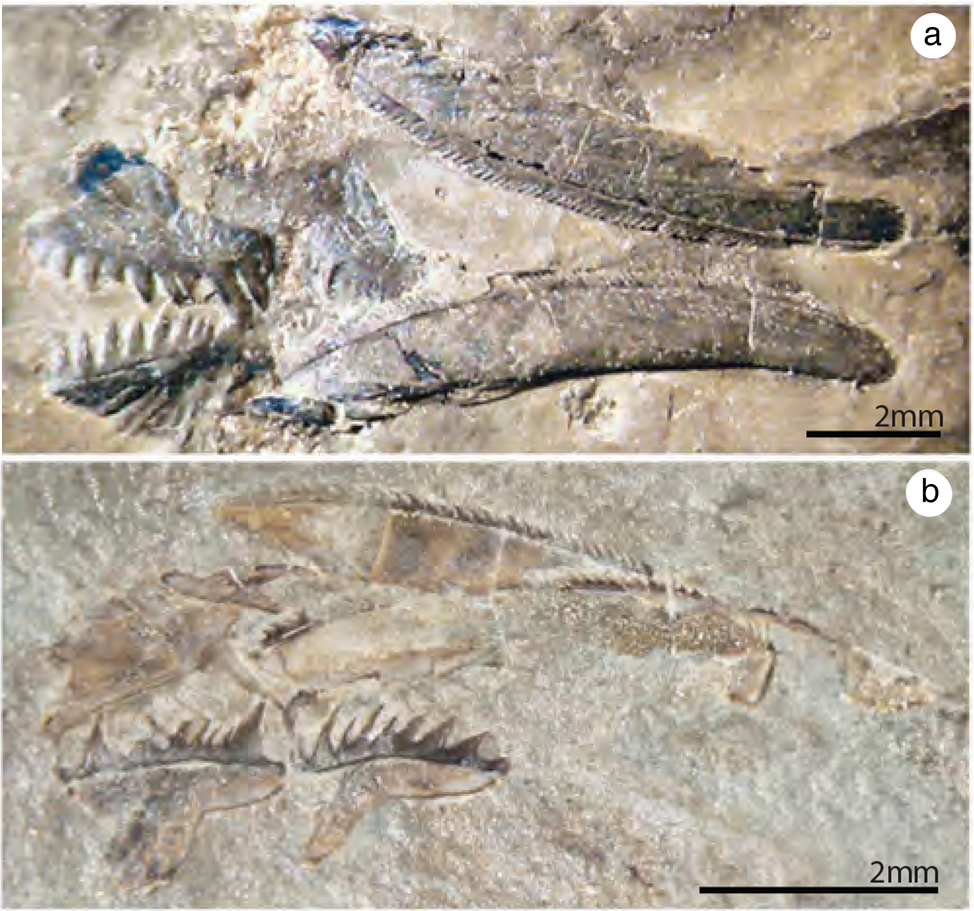
- Articulated Archeognathus primus fossils from the Winneshiek Shale of Iowa

Scientific classification
- Kingdom: Animalia
- Phylum: Chordata
- Infraphylum: Agnatha
- Class: †Conodonta
- Family: †Archeognathidae
- Genus: †Archeognathus; Cullison, 1938

Species
- A. primus Cullison, 1938 (type); A. carinatus Cullison, 1938

Synonyms
- Youngquistina

= Archeognathus =

Archeognathus Temporal range: Mid Ordovician

Extinct genus of fishes

Archeognathus is a fossilized jaw apparatus of a large predatory conodont from the Ordovician period (Darriwilian to Sandbian stages). Its large size has made classification difficult, and it has historically been compared to conodonts and gnathostomes (jawed fish) since its remains were first discovered in Missouri. Complete articulated jaw apparatus of Archeognathus primus are common in the Winneshiek Shale lagerstätte of Iowa, allowing its identity as a conodont to be secured.

The jaw apparatus of Archeognathus primus is much more simple than that of most conodonts, with only six elements in its jaw. These include a pair of long, small-toothed, sawblade-like "coleodiform" S elements at the front of the jaw, followed by two pairs of smaller "archeognathiform" P elements with large teeth.
