= Joachim Dolomite =

Geologic formation in the United States

- Stratigraphic range: Ordovician
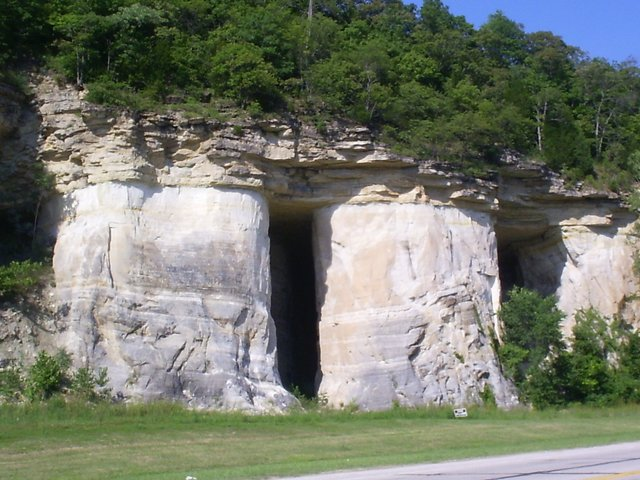
- Joachim Dolomite over St. Peter Sandstone (Pacific, Missouri)
- Type: Formation
- Unit of: Ancell Group
- Underlies: Pecatonica Formation and Plattin Limestone
- Overlies: St. Peter Sandstone
- Thickness: 0 to 100+ feet in Arkansas

Lithology
- Primary: dolomite

Location
- Region: Arkansas, Illinois, Missouri
- Country: United States

Type section
- Named for: Joachim Creek, Jefferson County, Missouri
- Named by: Arthur Winslow

The Joachim Dolomite is a Middle Ordovician geologic formation in Arkansas, Illinois, and Missouri. The name was first introduced in 1894 by Arthur Winslow in his study of the geology of Missouri. Winslow designated a stratotype along Plattin Creek, which was misidentified as Joachim Creek, in Jefferson County. The name was introduced into Arkansas in 1911, replacing part of the, now abandoned, Izard Limestone.

== See also ==
- List of fossiliferous stratigraphic units in Arkansas
- Paleontology in Arkansas
