= St. Peter Sandstone =

North American geological formation

- Stratigraphic range: Middle Ordovician
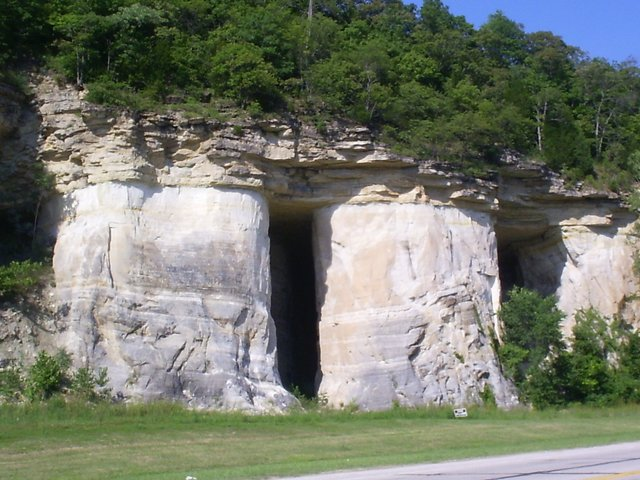
- Old mine entrances in the St. Peter Sandstone formation in Pacific, Missouri, where it is still actively quarried nearby.
- Type: Formation
- Unit of: Ancell Group
- Underlies: Dutchtown Formation, Glenwood Shale, Joachim Dolomite, and Wells Creek Formation
- Overlies: Beekmantown Dolomite, Everton Formation, Shakopee Dolomite

Location
- Region: Midwest
- Country: United States
- Extent: Arkansas, Illinois, Indiana, Iowa, Minnesota, Missouri, Wisconsin and West Virginia

Type section
- Named for: St. Peters River (now Minnesota River), Minnesota
- Named by: David Dale Owen

The St. Peter Sandstone is an Ordovician geological formation. It belongs to the Chazyan stage of the Champlainian series in North American regional stratigraphy, equivalent to the late Darriwilian global stage. This sandstone originated as a sheet of sand in clear, shallow water near the shore of a Paleozoic sea and consists of fine-to-medium-size, well-rounded quartz grains with frosted surfaces. The extent of the formation spans north–south from Minnesota to Arkansas and east–west from Illinois into Nebraska and South Dakota. The formation was named by David Dale Owen (1847) after the Minnesota River, then known as the St. Peter River. The type locality is at the confluence of the Mississippi and Minnesota Rivers near Fort Snelling, Minnesota. In eastern Missouri, the stone consists of quartz sand that is 99.44% silica.

== Outcrop ==
In Minnesota, the soft St. Peter Sandstone can be observed at the bluffs of the Mississippi River valley beneath a very thin layer of Glenwood Shale and a much thicker layer of Platteville limestone. Examples can be seen in the Mississippi River Gorge and at Minnehaha Falls in Minneapolis, the bluffs from downtown to Mounds Park in Saint Paul, and Minneopa Falls near Mankato. In Illinois, Castle Rock is a large bluff of St. Peter Sandstone, and Starved Rock State Park and Matthiessen State Park feature numerous outcroppings and canyons.

== Commercial use ==
St. Peter sandstone, also called "Ottawa Sand" in commercial applications, has a relatively uniform size and shape for each grain. It is used for the manufacture of glass, for filter and molding sand, and for abrasives. Its purity is especially important to glassmakers.

It is also important, as proppant otherwise known as frac sand in oil and gas drilling – In Garnavillo, Iowa, Northeast Iowa the Pattson sand company has been mining the sand and shipping it to the fracking areas of the US via rail cars. loose sand pumped in a liquid mix under high pressure into a well where the sand grains wedge into and hold open any fractures in the rock, enhancing the extraction of hydrocarbons. The uniform particle size also makes the sand useful for laboratory experiments.

== Mining locations ==
St. Peter sandstone is or has been mined

- Arkansas: Guion, Arkansas
- Illinois: Ottawa, Illinois, Sheridan, Illinois, Wedron, Illinois, Oregon, Illinois, and Naplate, Illinois
- Minnesota: Kasota, Minnesota and Ottawa Township, Minnesota
- Missouri: Pacific, Festus, Crystal City, Augusta, and Pevely
- Garnavillo, Iowa

The Unimin Corporation is a large producer of commercial sand and operates surface mines in many of these locations.
