= Bromalite =

Trace fossil

Bromalites are the fossilized remains of material sourced from the digestive system of organisms. As such, they can be broadly considered to be trace fossils. The most well-known types of bromalites are fossilized faeces or coprolites. However, other types are recognised, including: regurgitalites (fossilized remains of vomit or other regurgitated objects such as owl pellets); cololites (intestinal contents); and gastrolites (stomach contents). Regurgitalites and coprolites are thus essentially known only after they have left the body of the producing organisms, whereas gastrolites and cololites are found in situ in their respective organs, but there are rare exceptions (see Seilacher, 2002).

Whilst coprolites and regurgitalites are often difficult to tie to a specific producer, all bromalites potentially provide important and sometimes unique evidence concerning diet and other trophic factors. They are thus useful indicators for reconstructing ancient food webs in palaeoecology.
