= Guttenberg Community School District =

Defunct school district in Iowa, United States

Guttenberg Community School District (GCSD) was a school district headquartered in Guttenberg, Iowa.

It operated a K-8 School and Guttenberg High School.

== History ==
In December 1999 the district and the Garnavillo Community School District agreed to begin whole-grade-sharing (in which students from one district attend another district's schools for a particular grade level) in 2001. The district began sharing athletic teams with Garnavillo in 2000. The whole grade-sharing began as scheduled in 2001. The districts combined their secondary schools, with the high school in Guttenberg and the middle school in Garnavillo. The two retained their respective elementary schools.

On September 14, 2004, an election on merging the two districts into one was held, with Guttenberg district voters approving it 396–19, and Garnavillo district voters approving it 188–20. The merger into the Clayton Ridge Community School District was effective July 1, 2005.
