= Dutchtown, Iowa =

Millheim, Iowa
- Unincorporated community
- Nickname: Dutchtown
- Location in Iowa Millheim (the United States)
- Coordinates: 42°33′7.95″N 91°24′39.52″W
- Country: United States
- State: Iowa
- County: Delaware County
- Time zone: UTC-6 (Central (CST))
  - Summer (DST): UTC-5 (CDT)

Millheim (also known as Dutchtown) is an unincorporated community in Delaware County, Iowa, United States.

== Geography ==
Millheim is located between Oneida and Thorpe, in sections 2 and 3 of Delaware Township.

== History ==
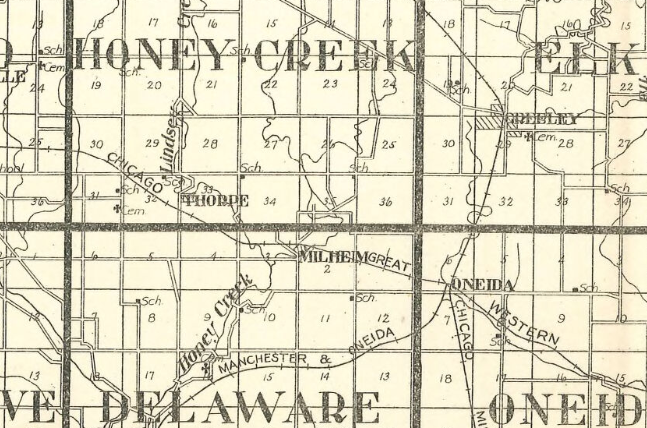
Thorpe, Millheim, and Oneida, Iowa, along the Chicago and Great Western Railroad

Millheim was platted by R. Stewart on July 21, 1858. It was named by John Kaltenbach, who "gave the new town the name of his birth-place in Baden, Germany". It was in sections 2 and 3 of Delaware Township.

Kaltenbach built a sawmill in 1853, on Honey Creek. He added a flour mill in 1864, but the flour mill proved inefficient. It was later sold to a Mr. Olmstead, who sold it to Mr. Clugston, who sold it to T. Holmes.

The first home was owned by a man named Sherman, who opened a grocery store in the community. In 1868, a log church building was constructed in Millheim. A glove and mitten factory, owned by Chester Burgiss, operated from 1872 to 1875.

Millheim was also known as Dutchtown; this was an alternate name in use by the time of the publication of The History of Delaware County, Iowa, in 1878. Millheim was selected (by drawn lots) as the county seat for Delaware County. This selection was unsatisfactory to the residents of the county, and an election was held; the community selected was Delhi (Delhi itself was later bypassed when the county seat was moved to Manchester in 1880).

Trade at Dutchtown had dwindled by 1914, with one author remarking, "As a trading point Millheim, or "Dutch Town," as it came to be known, is now a thing of the past." By the 1930s, Millheim was considered an abandoned town, and was listed as such in the 1931 publication The Annals of Iowa.

== See also ==
- Robinson, Iowa
