= Forestville, Iowa =

Unincorporated community in Iowa, US

- Unincorporated community
- Location within Iowa
- Coordinates: 42°35′48″N 91°31′43″W
- Country: United States
- State: Iowa
- County: Delaware
- Elevation: 1,017 ft (310 m)
- Time zone: UTC-6 (Central (CST))
  - Summer (DST): UTC-5 (CDT)
- Area code: 563
- GNIS feature ID: 464549

Forestville is an unincorporated community in Richland Township, Delaware County, Iowa, United States. The community was named after the forest in adjacent Backbone State Park, and lies two miles northeast of Dundee.

== Geography ==
Forestville lies in section 22 of Richland Township.

== History ==
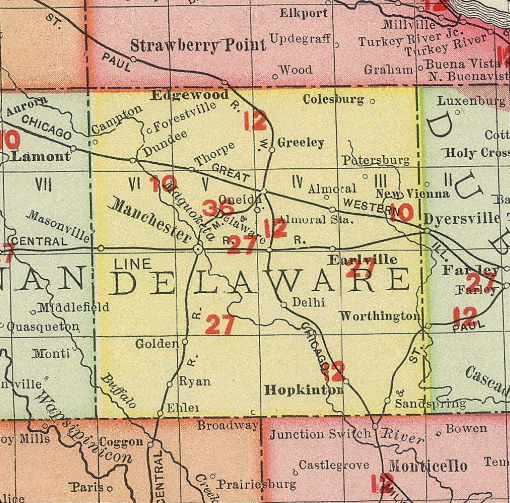
Forestville in northwestern Delaware County, Iowa, in 1903

The first white settler was William Turner, who built a sawmill in 1847; this sawmill was destroyed in a flood but was replaced with a new mill in 1851. Turner opened a store in 1850. The mill was purchased by Daniel Leonard in 1852; he opened a store in Forestville, and in 1853 he added a grist mill near the sawmill. These were among the earliest buildings in the community.

The Forestville post office was established on April 24, 1851. The first postmaster was William Turner.

Forestville was platted in April 1854 in Section 22 of Richland Township by surveyor Joel Bailey for landowner Daniel Leonard. Although the plat occurred in 1854, the recording occurred on July 15, 1856.

In 1852, Charles Hall opened a tavern. That same year, in May, the first Forestville school house, a log building, was constructed. School opened that summer, with just a few students, and with William Wilson as the schoolmaster. The first sermon in Forestville was given in this log schoolhouse, and was given by Reverend John Brown from Rockville in June 1852.

A frame school building was constructed in 1854; the cost of the building, constructed by Elihu Andrews, was $300. This schoolhouse lay on the east side of Forestville. In the summer of 1871, a brick school replaced the wooden frame one, after a fire occurred the previous winter. This brick structure cost $700. In 1872, the Forestville Independent School District was formed.

Hiram Wood established a creamery near Forestville in 1874, one of four in Richland Township. In 1876, Volney Weaver served as the last postmaster of Forestville. The post office was discontinued that year, on June 28th. In 1887, the community's population was 180.

The community's population declined over the years. In 1902, Forestville's population was 44, and a 1914 history of Delaware County stated that by that time, only around 50 residents lived in Forestville. At that time, a county history stated, "Forestville is scarcely a memory."

Just north of Forestville are distinctive limestone cliffs known as the "Devil's Backbone". In 1919, Backbone State Park was established; it is Iowa's oldest state park, and covers over 2,000 acres (8.1 km^{2}).

== See also ==
- Rockville, Iowa
