= Hartwick, Delaware County, Iowa =

Former community in Delaware County, Iowa, US

Hartwick, Iowa
- ghost town
- Location within Iowa Location within the United States
- Coordinates: 42°24′44″N 91°21′37″W
- Country: United States
- State: Iowa
- County: Delaware
- Elevation: 942 ft (287 m)
- Time zone: UTC-6 (Central (CST))
  - Summer (DST): UTC-5 (CDT)
- Area code: 563
- GNIS feature ID: 466230

Hartwick is a former townsite located in Delhi Township, Delaware County, Iowa, United States.

== Geography ==
The community was situated on the Maquoketa River, at the intersection of 220th Avenue, southwest of Delhi.

== History ==
=== Early years ===
The Hartwick post office opened on January 1, 1853, and operated until September 24, 1861. It was reestablished on June 12, 1872, but permanently closed on December 10 of the same year.

John W. Clark founded and platted Hartwick in Section 30 of Delhi Township in December 1858. Clark had previously built a saw mill in 1849 and a flour mill in 1853. In 1855, John Whitman opened a blacksmith shop in Hartwick, followed by a cobbler, a brickyard, and a paint shop. The Hartwick Bridge, a bowstring through truss bridge, crossed the river adjacent to Furman's Mill.

=== Decline ===
By the turn of the century, Hartwick's heyday had ended. The community's founder, John Clark, departed in 1861, with several others following. Clark's house was subsequently leased to the county as a poor farm.

By 1914, a county history referred to Hartwick as a "forgotten village". Hartwick continued to appear on maps throughout the early 20th century, though with decreasing frequency.

Today, the site of Hartwick is marked by the replacement Hartwick Bridge spanning the river. Additionally, there is a marina named Hartwick Marina and the Hartwick Amish General Store in the area.

== See also ==
York, Iowa
