= Thorpe, Iowa =

- Unincorporated community
- Location within Iowa
- Coordinates: 42°33′58″N 91°26′58″W
- Country: United States
- State: Iowa
- County: Delaware
- Elevation: 1,027 ft (313 m)
- Time zone: UTC-6 (Central (CST))
  - Summer (DST): UTC-5 (CDT)
- Area code: 563
- GNIS feature ID: 462229

Thorpe is an unincorporated community in Honey Creek Township, Delaware County, Iowa, United States.

== Geography ==
The community is at the intersection of county highways C64 and X15, 5.1 miles (8.2 km) east of Dundee.

== History ==
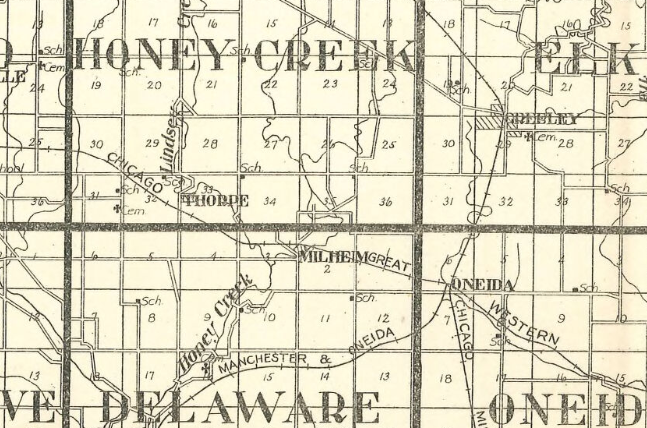
Thorpe, Millheim, Oneida, Iowa

In 1886 and 1887, the Chicago Great Western Railway was built through Delaware County. The railroad company built four rail stations: one each in Almoral, Oneida, Dundee, and Thorpe.

In 1911, D.T. Wonleighton built a general store in Thorpe. He later served as the general manager of the Mayen mercantile in Thorpe.

Thorpe's population was 42 in 1902, and 76 in 1925.

Thorpe's population was 35 in 1940.

== See also ==
- York, Iowa
