= Silver Creek, Iowa =

- Unincorporated community
- Location in Iowa Silver Creek (the United States)
- Coordinates: 42°21′40″N 91°34′41″W
- Country: United States
- State: Iowa
- County: Delaware County
- Elevation: 994 ft (303 m)
- Time zone: UTC-6 (Central (CST))
  - Summer (DST): UTC-5 (CDT)

Silver Creek is an unincorporated community in Delaware County, Iowa, United States.

== Geography ==
It is located on County Highway D47, one mile north of Robinson and two miles southeast of Monti.

== History ==
Silver Creek was founded in spring 1852. The original settlers were the families of John Robinson, William Robinson, James Robinson, James Lendrum, Anthony Swindle, William Swindle, and John McKay.

The settlers drew for lots, each hoping for land with timber on it, from which they could harvest wood for their homes. The earliest Silver Creek Church record dates from May 1855; this was called a "class meeting". The year of the building of the original log school/church is not known, but it burned to the ground sometime prior to the building of a new church in 1865, and which was dedicated in 1867. A separate school was built around this time.

Silver Creek was also known as Silvercreek. The post office was established under the name Silver Creek on June 13, 1890. The name was changed to Silvercreek on December 1, 1895. William B Robinson, "one of the most prominent businessmen of Delaware County", was the first and only postmaster.

Silver Creek's population was just 10 in 1900. The Silver Creek post office closed on October 15, 1900.

Just south of Silver Creek, the town of Robinson was founded when the CAN Railroad was built, in 1911.

The population of Silver Creek was 11 in 1915. Silver Creek United Methodist church still operates in the community.

== See also ==
- Sand Springs, Iowa
