= Hazel Green, Iowa =

- former unincorporated community
- Location in Iowa Hazel Green (the United States)
- Coordinates: 42°21′45″N 91°23′21″W
- Country: United States
- State: Iowa
- County: Delaware County
- Elevation: 958 ft (292 m)
- Time zone: UTC-6 (Central (CST))
  - Summer (DST): UTC-5 (CDT)

Hazel Green was an unincorporated community in Delaware County, Iowa, United States.

== Geography ==
It was located at the junction of 295th Street and 212th Avenue, five miles east of Ryan and six miles west of Hopkinton.

== History ==
Hazel Green was also known as Hazelgreen, and was located in the eastern part of Hazel Green Township. The first settler, named Christopher Flint, moved to the area in 1853. The post office was established in June 1856, and Flint served as the first postmaster. A schoolhouse was built in 1859, and a general store and creamery were added in 1878.

Hazel Green's population was 40 in 1887, and 26 in 1902.

The site is mostly abandoned, with only a few scattered farms in the area.

== See also ==
- York, Iowa
