= Earlville =

Earlville may refer to places in:

== Australia ==
- Earlville, Queensland, a suburb in Cairns

== United States ==
- Earlville, Illinois
- Earlville, Iowa
- Earlville, New York
