= Adams Township, Delaware County, Iowa =

Adams Township
- Township
- Location in Delaware County
- Coordinates: 42°20′25″N 91°32′38″W
- Country: United States
- State: Iowa
- County: Delaware

Area
  - Total: 36.27 sq mi (93.94 km^{2})
  - Land: 36.27 sq mi (93.94 km^{2})
  - Water: 0 sq mi (0 km^{2}) 0%
- Elevation: 980 ft (300 m)

Population (2000)
  - Total: 781
  - Density: 21/sq mi (8.3/km^{2})
- GNIS feature ID: 0467373

Adams Township is a township in Delaware County, Iowa, United States. As of the 2000 census, its population was 781.

== Geography ==
Adams Township covers an area of 36.27 square miles (93.94 square kilometers).

=== Cities and towns ===
- Ryan

=== Unincorporated towns ===
- Ehler
- Robinson

(This list is based on USGS data and may include former settlements.)R

=== Cemeteries ===
The township contains two cemeteries, Pleasant Hill and Silver Creek.
