= Dutchtown =

Dutchtown and Dutch Town may refer to a place in the United States:

- Dutchtown, Colorado, a ghost town listed on the NRHP in Colorado
- Dutchtown, Louisiana, an unincorporated community
- Dutchtown, Missouri, a village in Cape Girardeau County
- Dutchtown, Atlantic County, New Jersey, an unincorporated community
- Dutchtown, Somerset County, New Jersey, an unincorporated community
- Dutchtown, New York, a hamlet in Erie County
- Dutch Town, West Virginia
- Dutchtown, St. Louis, Missouri, a neighborhood
- Dutchtown, Iowa, an unincorporated community

== See also ==
- Deutschtown, Pittsburgh, Pennsylvania, a neighborhood
