= Backbone State Park =

State park in Iowa

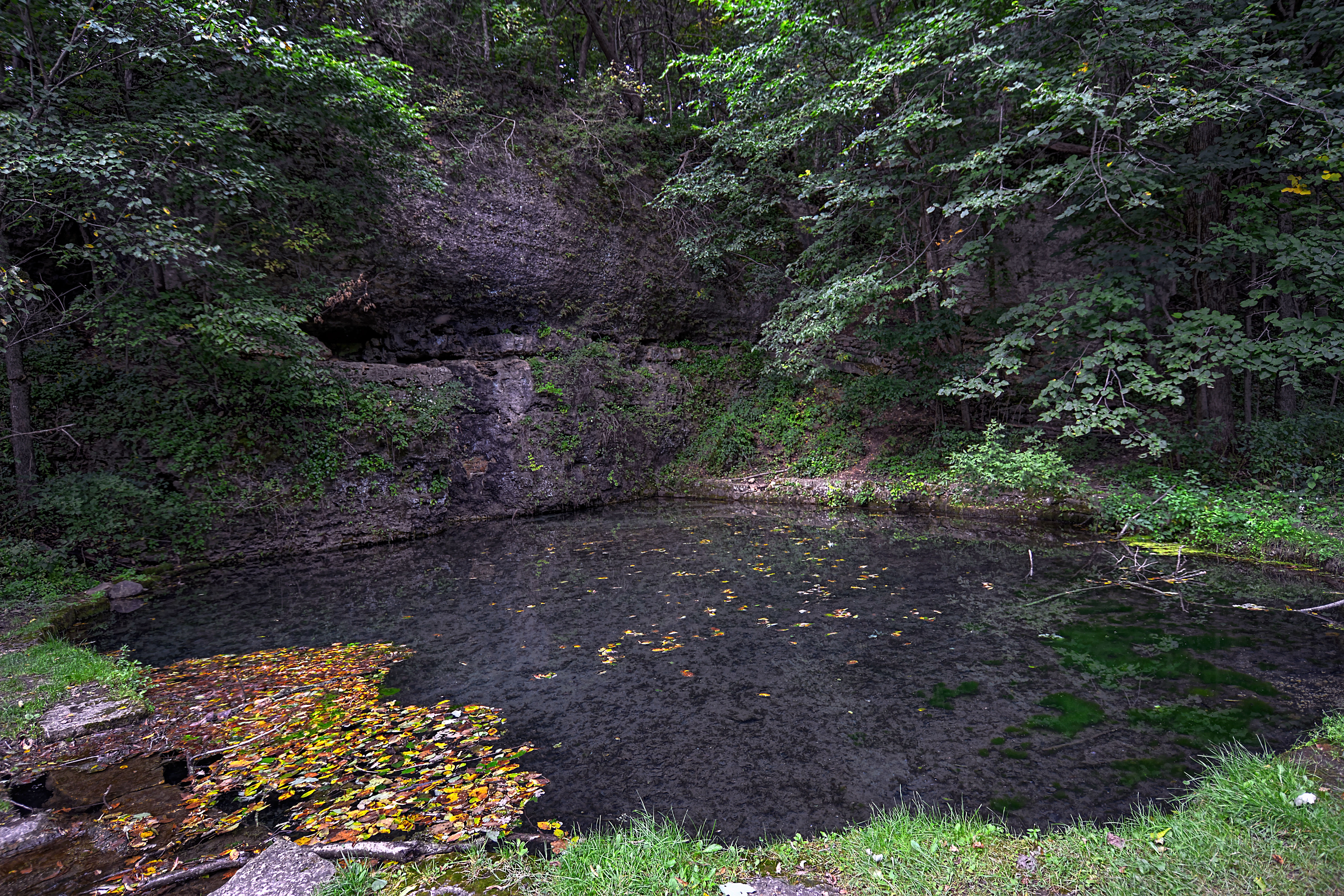
- Richmond Springs

- Location within Iowa Location within the United States
- Location: Delaware County, Iowa, United States
- Nearest city: Dundee, Iowa
- Coordinates: 42°37′59″N 91°33′42″W
- Area: 2,001 acres (810 ha)
- Established: 1919 (purchase); 1920 (dedication)
- Administrator: Iowa Department of Natural Resources
- Website: Official website
- Backbone State Park Historic District
- U.S. National Register of Historic Places
- U.S. Historic district
- Area: 1,415 acres (573 ha)
- Built: 1933-1942
- Architect: John R. Fitzsimmons
- Architectural style: Rustic
- MPS: CCC Properties in Iowa State Parks MPS
- NRHP reference No.: 91001842
- Added to NRHP: December 23, 1991

Backbone State Park is Iowa's oldest state park, dedicated in 1920. Located in the valley of the Maquoketa River, it is approximately three miles (5 km) south of Strawberry Point in Delaware County. It is named for a narrow and steep ridge of bedrock carved by a loop of the Maquoketa River originally known as the Devil's Backbone. The initial 1,200 acres (490 ha) were donated by E.M. Carr of Lamont, Iowa. Backbone Lake Dam, a relatively low dam built by the Civilian Conservation Corps (CCC) in the 1930s, created Backbone Lake. The CCC constructed a majority of trails and buildings which make up the park.

== History ==
The area of the Devil's Backbone was a favorite of natural scientists such as W.J. McGee, Thomas Macbride, and Samuel Calvin who visited it to study its ancient geologic formations. Edward M. Carr bought 1,200 acres (490 ha) in the 1890s to protect the Backbone Ridge from destruction. MacBride and members of the Iowa Park and Forestry Association thought of it as a prime location for a state park. The State Board of Conservation, organized in December 1918, recommended buying the land at its first meeting. It took a little over a year for the purchase to be finalized. On May 28, 1920, Backbone was dedicated as Iowa's first state park.

Development of the park was deferred until 1925, although trees were planted and planning for a roadway was begun in prior years. Tensions developed between two groups in the 1920s and the 1930s over development. One group saw the state parks as places that protected the natural areas, and the second group had a multiple-use philosophy of conservation. The multiple-use concept won the debate. Two camps from the Civilian Conservation Corps, a public work relief program during the Great Depression, developed the park between 1933 and 1942. CCC Camp SP2 and Camp SP17 developed the overnight cabin and recreational area on the southern end of the park; a picnic, hiking, and camping area in the center; and Richmond Springs on the north end. Backbone became one of the largest and one of the most extensively developed parks in the state system.

=== Historic district ===
Three distinct areas of park were individually listed as historic districts on the National Register of Historic Places in 1990: Cabin-Bathing Area (Area A), Picnicking, Hiking & Camping Area (Area B), and Richmond Springs (Area C). They contain 70 contributing resources and are differentiated by function as described below. They were incorporated into a larger district the following year. At that time, an additional 31 resources were added when the historic district expanded; out of the grand total, 21 are considered contributing properties. The contributing resources include: the stone portals at the north entrance, two stone erosion control dams, an auditorium, two stone latrines, two sets of stone trail steps, a stone wall, two trout rearing ponds, the fish hatchery garage, two stone drinking fountains, a stone pumphouse, a stone lodge now used as a museum, a stone barn, and four commemorative markers. One of the markers commemorates the Daughters of the American Revolution of Iowa who planted 6,000 trees in the park. The other three mark three roads that were named for three individuals who were instrumental in establishing the park: State Senator Byron W. Newberry, State Treasurer E.H. Hoyt, and landowner E.M. Carr. Included within the boundaries of the larger historic district are 1,415 acres (573 ha), the geographical area of the park in 1942 when the CCC completed its development work. The park was part of a larger study of Iowa's state parks called the "Civilian Conservation Corps Properties in Iowa State Parks: 1933-1942".

=== Cabin-Bathing Area (Area A) ===
Area A is located at the southern end of the park and around the 125-acre (51 ha) Backbone Lake on the Makoqueta River. Its historic buildings and structures include 17 cabins, pump house, two sets of trail steps, soil erosion dams, six parking areas, paved road, the site of CCC Camp 1756, bathhouse, boathouse, a wall, the beach, two drinking fountains, pit latrine, a sundial and bench, dam, and the sand filter bed. The lake was created by the dam and spillways that were constructed from August 1933 to October 1934. The bathhouse was built between September 1934 and April 1935, while the boathouse was built between January and May 1935. Both of these structures are located on the east side of the lake. They are composed of roughly coursed limestone, and the boathouse includes a round tower at its south end. The sundial and bench are located south of the bathhouse on the east shore of the lake. The semi-circular, courses ashlar bench surrounds a flagstone patio, in the middle of which is the sundial. They were completed sometime between November 1935 and March 1936. Eighteen single-family cabins were built north of the bathing area between 1937 and 1941. It is believed they were built from south to north. They are all single-story, rectangular, frame structures. One of the cabins is considered a noncontributing building.

=== Picnicking, Hiking & Camping Area (Area B) ===
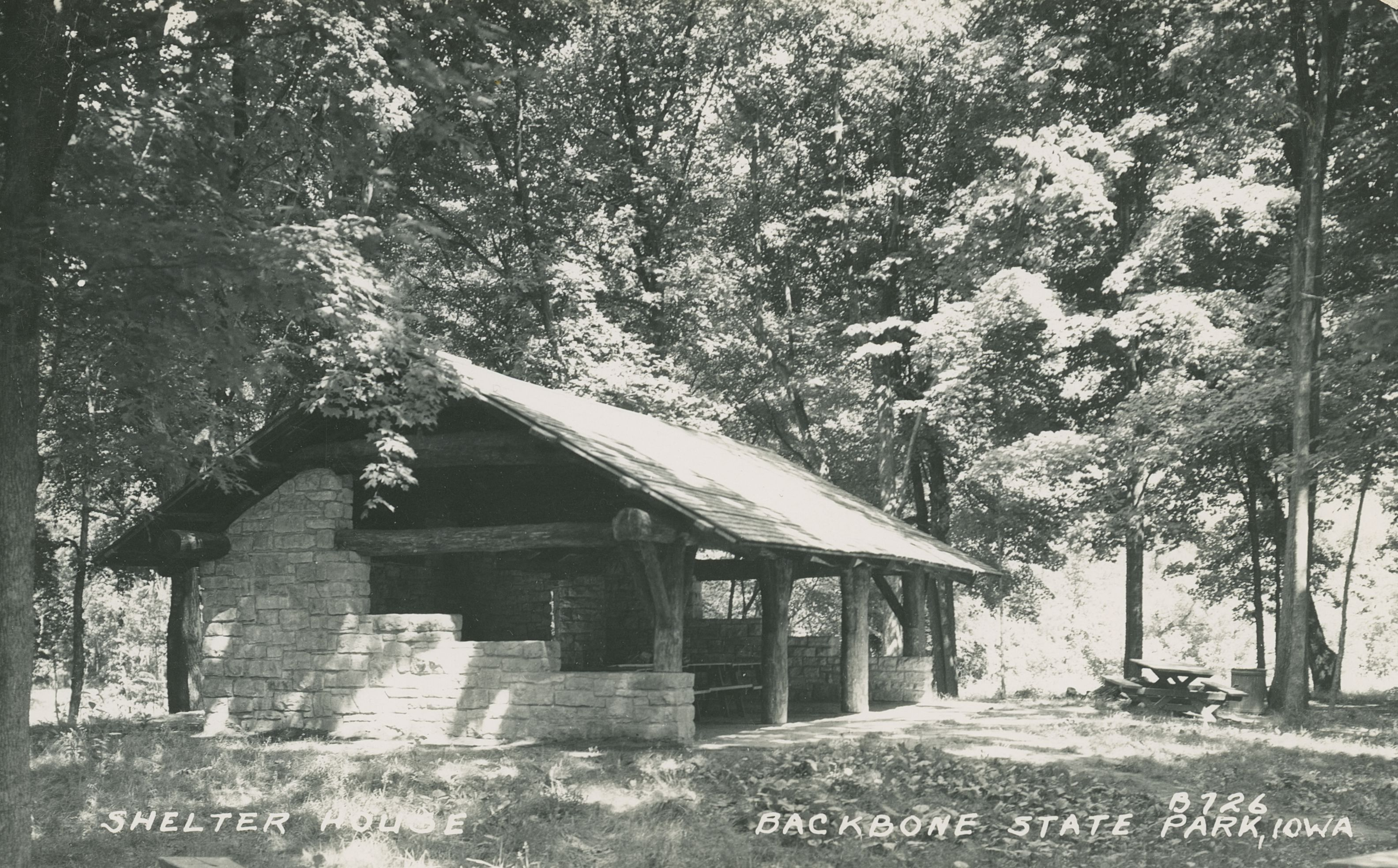
Picnic shelter

Area B is located near the center of the park. Its historic buildings and structures include a picnic shelter/concession, two more picnic shelters, two pit latrines, the site of CCC Camp 781, the east entrance entryways and gate, four overlooks, two trailside benches, six parking lots, a vehicle bridge, trail steps, the Backbone Trail and steps, Watercrest Springs, a sign, a drinking fountain, and paved roads. The CCC began constructing the picnic facilities beginning in December 1933 and continued until at least 1938. Work on the Backbone Trail, which follows the top of Backbone Ridge, began at the end of 1933 and continued until about December 1934. The concession was built between January and May 1937. One of the picnic shelters and the picnic shelter/concession are composed of uncoursed, rough-faced ashlar limestone, and oak timbers. The second picnic shelter is a rectangular roof that is supported by triple and single timber posts and timber framing. The Watercrest Springs is a landscaping device composed of two sections of random rubble, limestone retaining walls that are stepped up a hill creating a shallow pool at the head of the natural spring. The remains of CCC Camp 781 includes the concrete foundations from the frame buildings.

=== Richmond Springs (Area C) ===
Area C is located on the north end of the park. Its historic structures include Richmond Springs, steps, and a waterway. The springs are a natural feature that were enclosed by the CCC from June 1934 to March 1935. The waterway was built from October 1935 to March 1936. It created a new channel from the area to prevent overflow into the springs. The work was done, in part, to protect the springs as a source of potable water.

== Land use ==
Measuring 2,001 acres (810 ha), the region is heavily forested, mainly in species of oak and maple. The geology of the area is particularly noteworthy. As part of the Driftless Area, it was left unglaciated during the last Ice Age, with very ancient dolomite formations dating from the Silurian period. A large ridge of rock divides the park, resembling a spine, and lends its name to the park and adjacent forest. The area is characterized by active springs, caves, sinkholes and karsts. With cliffs measuring over 80 feet in places, climbing and rappelling are popular and require a permit.

Twenty-one miles of multi-use trails support year-round recreational activities, including hiking as well as cross-country skiing and snowmobiling in winter. The lake is noted for its swimming, boating, and fishing. Backbone Creek is known to support both rainbow and brown trout, and is stocked by the Iowa Department of Natural Resources from local brood ponds. The park also has campsites, cabins, shower buildings and a playground.

Backbone State Forest is immediately adjacent to the park. It consists of 186 acres (75 ha) of pine forest where horseback riding, hiking, hunting and cross-country skiing are permitted.

== Iowa Civilian Conservation Corps Museum ==
The Iowa Civilian Conservation Corps Museum provides exhibits about the activities of the Civilian Conservation Corps (CCC) in Iowa state parks. Backbone State Park was the site of two CCC camps, and many of the buildings and trails in the park were built by the CCC. The museum opened in 1991.
