= West Delaware County Community School District =

Public school district in Manchester, Iowa, United States

Coordinates: 42.488988°N 91.453001°W

Location
- Manchester, Iowa Delaware County Manchester, Delaware, Iowa, 52057; United States
- Coordinates: 42.488988, -91.453001

District information
- Type: Local school district
- Grades: K-12
- President: Steve Buesing
- Vice-president: Jamie Vaske
- Superintendent: Jen Vance
- Schools: 3
- Budget: $21,126,000 (2020-21)
- NCES District ID: 1930900

Students and staff
- Students: 1380 (2022-23)
- Teachers: 104.76 FTE
- Staff: 109.79 FTE
- Student–teacher ratio: 13.17
- Athletic conference: WaMaC Conference
- District mascot: Hawks
- Colors: Orange and Black

Other information
- Website: www.w-delaware.k12.ia.us

The West Delaware County Community School District, or West Delaware CCSD is a rural public school district based in Manchester, Iowa. The district is almost completely within Delaware County, with a small portion in Buchanan County. It serves the city of Manchester and surrounding areas, including the towns of Dundee, Greeley, Masonville, and Ryan.

== Mascot ==
The school's mascot is the Hawks. Their colors are Black and Orange.

== Schools ==
The district operates three schools, all in Manchester:

- Lambert Elementary School
- West Delaware Middle School
- West Delaware High School

=== West Delaware High School ===
==== Athletics ====
The Hawks compete in the WaMaC Conference in the following sports:

- Baseball
  - Class 3A State Champions - 2007
- Basketball (boys and girls)
- Bowling (boys and girls)
  - Boys' 2-time Class 1A State Champions (2017, 2018)
- Cross Country (boys and girls)
- Football
  - Class 3A State Champions - 1991
- Golf (boys and girls) Boys Golf 3A State Champions 2014 at Ames Country Club
- Soccer (boys and girls)
- Softball
  - Class 3A State Champions - 2007
- Swimming (boys and girls)
- Tennis (boys and girls)
- Track and Field (boys and girls)
- Volleyball
  - 2015 Class 4A State Champions
  - 2021 Class 3A State Champions
- Wrestling
  - 4-time Class 2A State Champions (1991, 2013, 2019, 2021).
  - 5-time Class 2A State Duals Champions (1991, 2019, 2020, 2021, 2022).

== See also ==
- List of school districts in Iowa
- List of high schools in Iowa
