= Almoral, Iowa =

- Unincorporated community
- Location within Iowa
- Coordinates: 42°32′08″N 91°17′24″W
- Country: United States
- State: Iowa
- County: Delaware
- Elevation: 1,030 ft (310 m)
- Time zone: UTC-6 (Central (CST))
  - Summer (DST): UTC-5 (CDT)
- Zip: 52005
- Area code: 563
- GNIS feature ID: 464442

Almoral is an unincorporated community in Oneida Township, Delaware County, Iowa, United States.

== Geography ==
The community is on county highway D13, 3.9 miles (6.3 km) north-northwest of Earlville.

== History ==
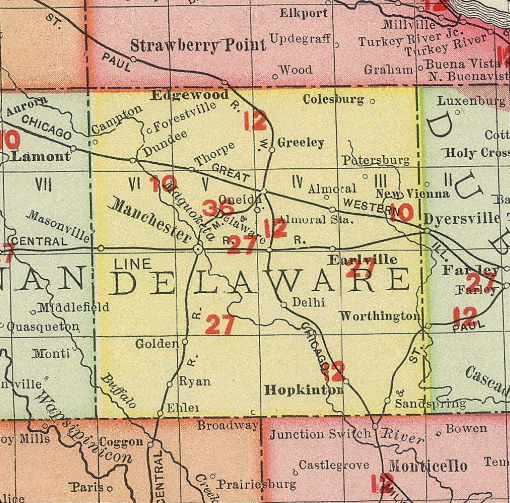
Almoral in east-central Delaware County, Iowa, in 1903

The first white settler in Almoral was the Reverend James H. Kasson, who arrived in 1854. In 1856, his home was purchased by Congregationalists from Massachusetts, who hoped to establish a religious commune in the area.

In 1857, Kasson platted Almoral. A log cabin school and post office also opened that year. In 1858, the Almoral Institute, a high school, opened, closing in 1860. In 1871, that building became the Almoral Congregational Church. In 1872, arrangements were made where a Methodist congregation would alternate meeting every other sabbath with the Congregationalists; eventually, the Methodists moved to the congregation in nearby Earlville. A new school house replaced the original log cabin school in 1864.

In 1876, a creamery opened in Almoral; a different creamery, operated by John Cruise, operated in later years.

The Chicago Great Western Railroad bypassed Almoral; a rail station and post office, named Almoral Siding or Almoral Station, opened about a mile south of Almoral, circa 1898. This post office closed in 1911.

In Autumn 1902, a new Almoral Congregational Church was completed, replacing the original building; the building's dedication took place on February 3, 1903.

Almoral's population was 26 in 1902.

The Almoral post office closed in 1902, with the introduction of rural free delivery; it reopened in 1912, and closed permanently in 1921.

Almoral's population was 4 in 1940.

== See also ==
York, Iowa
