= Delhi Dam =

Dam in Iowa, United States

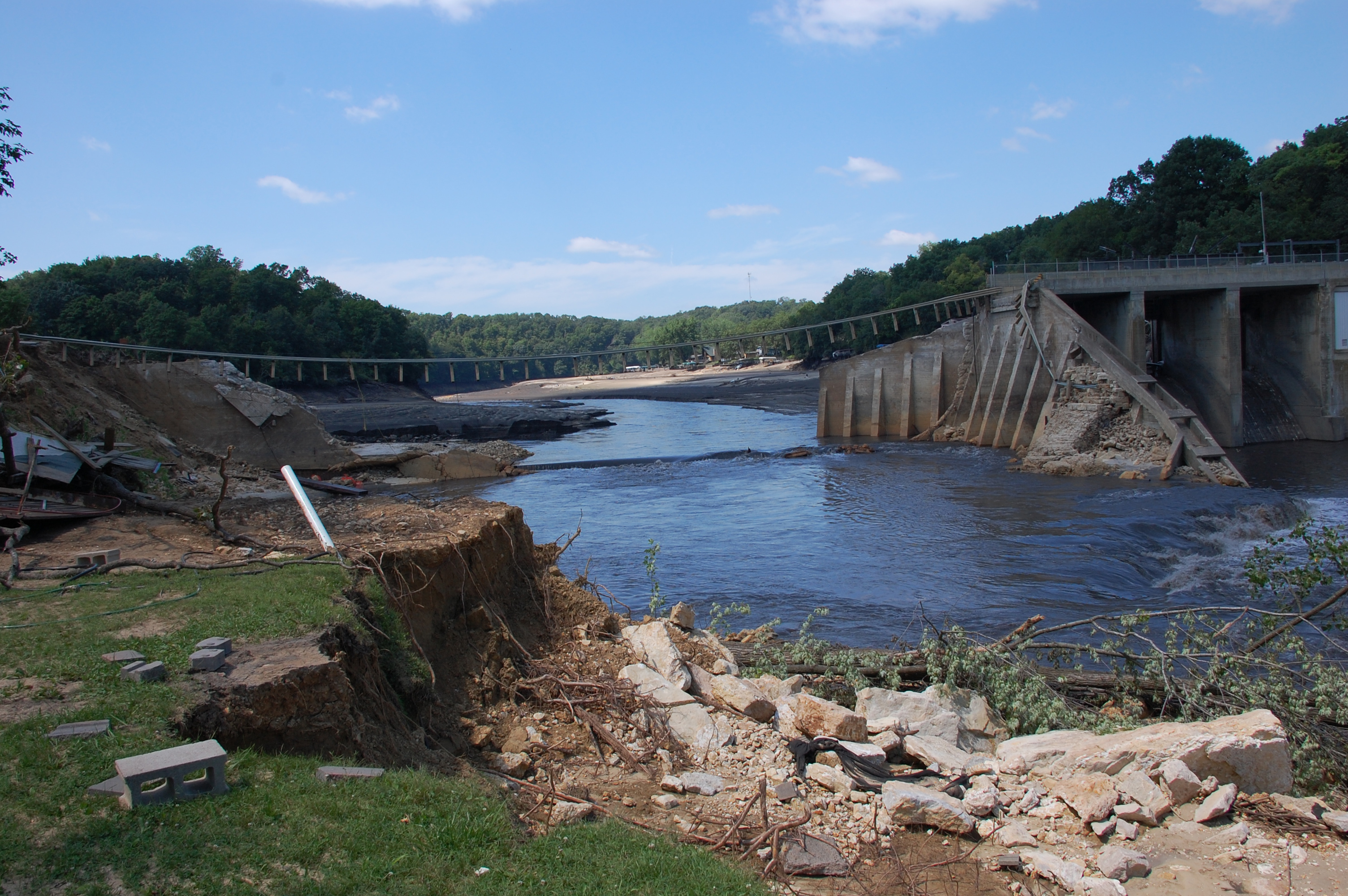
- The dam after it failed in 2010

- Location within the United States Location within Iowa
- Location: Delhi Township, Delaware County, near Delhi, Iowa
- Coordinates: 42°24′28″N 91°20′43″W
- Construction began: 1922
- Opening date: 1929
- Owner: Lake Delhi Recreation Association

Dam and spillways
- Type of dam: Embankment, concrete outlet section
- Height: 59 ft (18 m)
- Length: 704 ft (215 m) (Concrete section)
- Spillway type: Service, gate-controlled ogee
- Spillway capacity: 32,000 cu ft/s (910 m^{3}/s)

Reservoir
- Creates: Lake Delhi
- Total capacity: 3,790 acre⋅ft (4,670,000 m^{3})
- Catchment area: 347 sq mi (900 km^{2})
- Surface area: 218 ha (2.18 km^{2})
- Normal elevation: 896 ft (273 m)

Power Station
- Commission date: 1929
- Decommission date: 1968
- Turbines: 2
- Installed capacity: 1.5 MW (Proposed)
- Website; Lake Delhi Recreation Association

Delhi Dam, also known as Hartwick Dam, is an embankment dam on the Maquoketa River 2.5 kilometres (1.6 mi) southwest of Delhi, Iowa that created Lake Delhi. The dam was over-topped and subsequently failed on July 24, 2010 after a period of heavy rain. It was rebuilt in 2016.

The dam and lake are part of the Turtle Creek Recreation Area, and is owned by a local community group.

== History ==
The dam was built between 1922 and 1929 by the Interstate Power Company for hydroelectric power production, but its generators ceased operating in 1973 shortly before the Lake Delhi Recreation Association took ownership. Since then, it has been used for recreation. Several floods in 2008 caused an estimated $500,000 in damages to the dam and its floodgates. In October 2008, the Association signed a partnership with Modern Hydro to have the power plant's turbines refurbished and recommissioned. The new power plant was to have two turbine generators with a 1.5 MW capacity able to produce 3 GWh of electricity annually for sale to the local power utility. $1.5 million in funding was sought by the Iowa Power Fund and power production was expected as early as 2010. The dam was cited for minor problems during a 2009 Iowa Department of Natural Resources safety inspection.

=== 2010 failure ===
The southern embankment of the Delhi Dam failed on July 24, due to a period of about 10 inches (250 mm) of rainfall in twelve hours. Before the breach, river levels upstream of the dam had reached 24.22 ft (7.38 m), 10 feet (3 m) above flood stage and breaking the May 2004 record of 21.66 ft (6.60 m). However, the stream flow at the time was 1,400 cu ft/s (40 m^{3}/s) less than the 2004 record peak stream flow of 26,000 cu ft/s (740 m^{3}/s). Only two of the dam's three spillway gates were fully open. Water eventually overtopped the dam, causing a 200 ft (61 m) long portion of the embankment and roadway to erode away and the lake to empty. Around 8,000 people in downstream areas like Hopkinton and Monticello had to be evacuated. The breach caused damage estimated in the millions of dollars thus far. In Monticello, 50 homes and 20 businesses received major flood damage among other damaged structures. The city's sewage treatment plant was also flooded, leaving residents without sewer services. Property owners that live near the lake pay special taxes to have the Lake Delhi Recreation Association (LDRA) maintain it, and replacement of the dam is uncertain, as the LDRA is in debt from previous lake-dredging costs.

In December 2010, an independent panel of engineers published a study that determined the cause of the failure "was internal erosion in the embankment coupled with overtopping flow". The study believes that a malfunctioning spillway gate and increase reservoir size may have exacerbated an existing problem with the dam's design. The embankment was constructed in such a way that its fill did not settle correctly. Within the embankment section, a concrete wall, designed to reinforce it, was not constructed up to the height of the dam's crest. That sped up internal erosion and allowed the water to over-top the dam.

=== Reconstruction ===
By March 2012, $1.7 million in donations was collected to replace the dam and $9 million in local and county bonds was approved. $5 million in state funding was then requested for repairs as well. The cost at that time was estimated around $12 million.

In April, 2014, ground was broken on a $16 million project to replace the failed Delhi Dam embankment and spillway. Completion of the project was scheduled for October, 2015. Of the cost, the state contributed $5 million, the county $3 million and the balance from assessments against the local property owners. In September 2016 the river level was back to pre-flood stage levels.

== See also ==
- Dam failure
- Hope Mills Dam
