= Ehler, Iowa =

Unincorporated community in Iowa, US

- Unincorporated community
- Location within Iowa
- Coordinates: 42°18′37″N 91°30′46″W
- Country: United States
- State: Iowa
- County: Delaware
- Elevation: 1,017 ft (310 m)
- Time zone: UTC-6 (Central (CST))
  - Summer (DST): UTC-5 (CDT)
- Area code: 563
- GNIS feature ID: 464549

Ehler is an unincorporated community in Adams Township, Delaware County, Iowa, United States. The community lies three miles southwest of Ryan.

== History ==
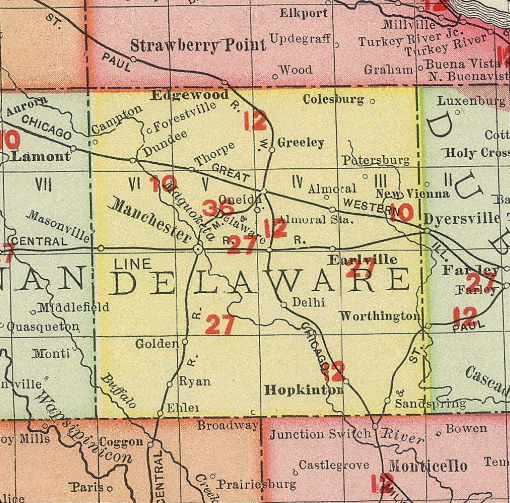
Ehler in southwestern Delaware County, Iowa, in 1903

Ehler's first settler was Henry Ehlers, who settled in that area of Delaware County in 1855, near a spring. Henry Ehlers has been a war veteran, and he later served as a member of the Delaware County board of supervisors.

The Illinois Central Railroad was built through this area of Adams Township, and the small community of Ehler was soon founded in Section 26 of the township. The Ehler post office was established in 1888. F.P. Ryan served as the first postmaster of Ehler.

A number of general stores operated in the community during its early years.

Ehler's population was 14 in 1887, and was 27 in 1902.

The Ehler post office closed in March 1914. At that time, Ehler was described as a "small village" in a 1914 history of Delaware County.

Ehler's population was 26 in 1917. The population was 100 in 1940.
