= Rockville, Iowa =

- Unincorporated community
- Location within the state of Iowa Rockville (the United States)
- Coordinates: 42°25′7″N 91°8′32″W
- Country: United States
- State: Iowa
- Counties: Delaware
- Established: 1845

Government
- Elevation: 925 ft (282 m)
- Time zone: UTC-6 (CST)
  - Summer (DST): UTC-5 (CDT)
- ZIP code: 52078
- Area code: 563
- FIPS code: 19-68220
- GNIS feature ID: 0464725

Rockville is a former city and unincorporated community in Delaware County, Iowa, United States. Bordering Dubuque County within the North Fork Township, it was approximately 3 miles northwest of Worthington and 1.5 miles west of today's Iowa Highway 136.

== History ==
Rockville was founded in 1845 by Oliver A. Olmstead. Second only to Delhi, it was one of the oldest towns in Delaware County. The area served as an important trading point and included a sawmill, a gristmill, a blacksmith, hotel, and various stores. Slightly predating Rockville's establishment, a log schoolhouse was built in 1843. This would be rebuilt in brick after burning down ten years after its founding.

During this era, Rockville served as a stagecoach stop for those heading west of the Mississippi River. The Rockville post office opened June 15, 1846 with Olmstead serving as postmaster, and a hotel was opened for travelers of the Western Stage Company. The town's popularity even saw Charles W. Hobbs, one of the first settlers in Delhi, relocating to Rockville in 1850. Hobbs subsequently opened a store which allegedly found great success.

However, Rockville's prosperity would not last in the face of its developing neighbors. The town's proverbial death knell came not long after the Dubuque and Pacific Railroad Company began building rails in the newly formed town of Dyersville. Rockville's post office closed for the second and final time on May 31, 1898. As Delhi and Dyersville grew, the town's role as a stagecoach declined and would virtually vanish by the end of the 19th century. Rockville's population in 1915 was just 1.

Today, the area is recognized simply as a rural area on the outskirts of Worthington. Remnants of its history can be seen in Rockville Cemetery, which includes veterans of the Civil and Mexican Wars, and the nearby remains of an old mill, which resides at the North Fork of the Maquoketa River. The hilly area, still traversed by gravel roads, now consists primarily of farms and woodland.

== Geography ==
Rockville is located at 42°25′7″N 91°8′32″W (42.4186086 -91.1420837), at an elevation of 925 feet (282 m).
