= Colesburg, Iowa =

- City
- Location of Colesburg, Iowa
- Coordinates: 42°38′20″N 91°12′04″W
- Country: United States
- State: Iowa
- County: Delaware

Area
  - Total: 0.29 sq mi (0.76 km^{2})
  - Land: 0.29 sq mi (0.76 km^{2})
  - Water: 0 sq mi (0.00 km^{2})
- Elevation: 1,161 ft (354 m)

Population (2020)
  - Total: 386
  - Density: 1,315.1/sq mi (507.76/km^{2})
- Time zone: UTC-6 (Central (CST))
  - Summer (DST): UTC-5 (CDT)
- ZIP code: 52035
- Area code: 563
- FIPS code: 19-15015
- GNIS feature ID: 2393594

Colesburg is a city in Delaware County, Iowa, United States. The population was 386 at the time of the 2020 census.

== History ==
Colesburg was laid out in 1848. The town was named for founders Hiram Cole and James Cole.

== Geography ==
According to the United States Census Bureau, the city has a total area of 0.29 square miles (0.75 km^{2}), all land.

== Demographics ==
Historical populations
| Year | Pop. | ±% |
|---|---|---|
| 1900 | 274 | — |
| 1910 | 271 | −1.1% |
| 1920 | 337 | +24.4% |
| 1930 | 340 | +0.9% |
| 1940 | 306 | −10.0% |
| 1950 | 326 | +6.5% |
| 1960 | 365 | +12.0% |
| 1970 | 379 | +3.8% |
| 1980 | 463 | +22.2% |
| 1990 | 439 | −5.2% |
| 2000 | 412 | −6.2% |
| 2010 | 404 | −1.9% |
| 2020 | 386 | −4.5% |
Source:"U.S. Census website". United States Census Bureau. and Iowa Data Center; Source: U.S. Decennial Census

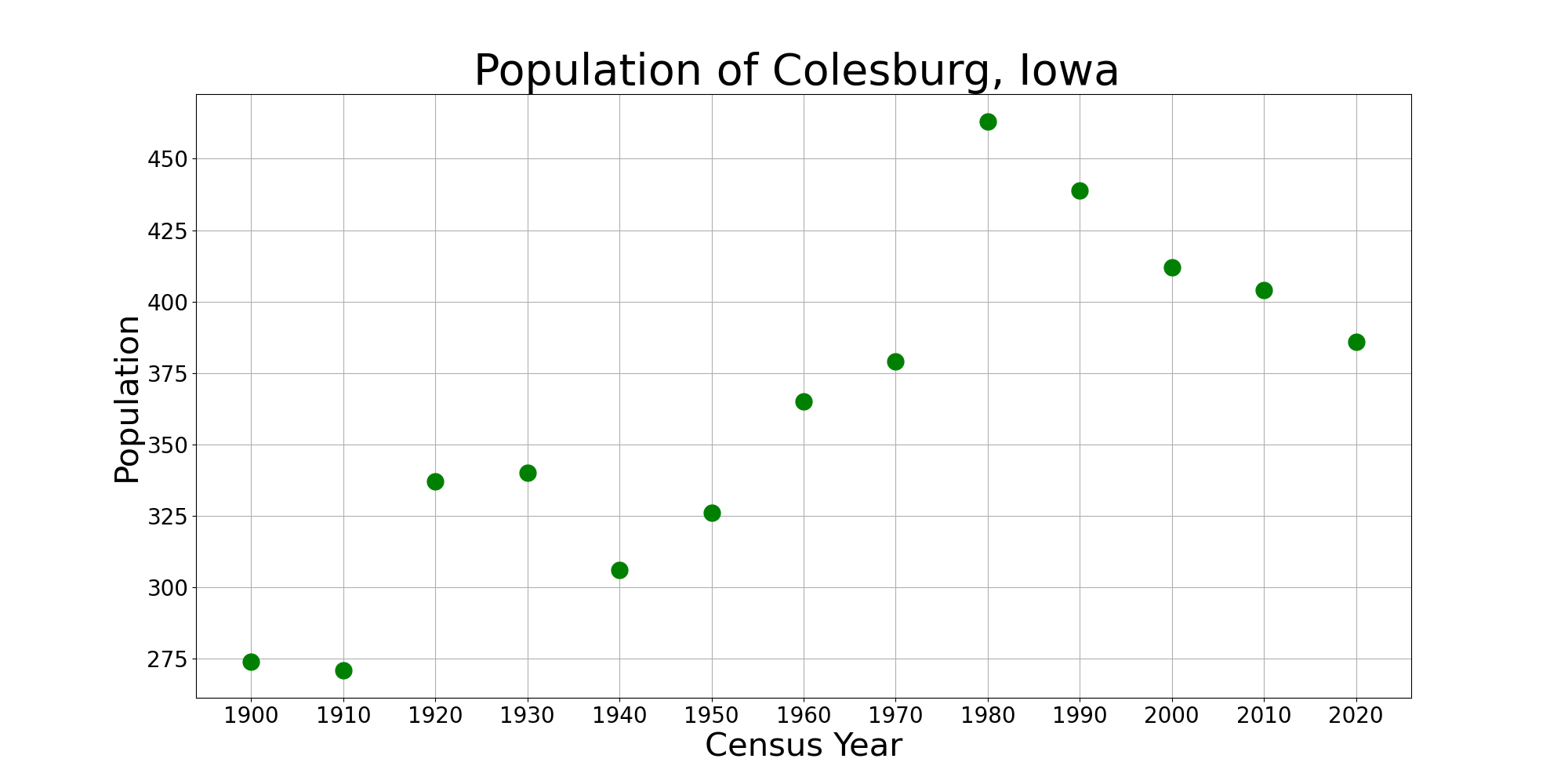
The population of Colesburg, Iowa from US census data

=== 2020 census ===
As of the census of 2020, there were 386 people, 173 households, and 114 families residing in the city. The population density was 1,315.1 inhabitants per square mile (507.8/km^{2}). There were 192 housing units at an average density of 654.1 per square mile (252.6/km^{2}). The racial makeup of the city was 95.3% White, 0.3% Black or African American, 0.0% Native American, 0.5% Asian, 0.0% Pacific Islander, 0.5% from other races and 3.4% from two or more races. Hispanic or Latino persons of any race comprised 1.6% of the population.

Of the 173 households, 35.3% of which had children under the age of 18 living with them, 48.6% were married couples living together, 3.5% were cohabitating couples, 24.9% had a female householder with no spouse or partner present and 23.1% had a male householder with no spouse or partner present. 34.1% of all households were non-families. 29.5% of all households were made up of individuals, 13.3% had someone living alone who was 65 years old or older.

The median age in the city was 38.9 years. 26.9% of the residents were under the age of 20; 4.9% were between the ages of 20 and 24; 25.1% were from 25 and 44; 22.5% were from 45 and 64; and 20.5% were 65 years of age or older. The gender makeup of the city was 52.1% male and 47.9% female.

=== 2010 census ===
As of the census of 2010, there were 404 people, 187 households, and 128 families living in the city. The population density was 1,393.1 inhabitants per square mile (537.9/km^{2}). There were 200 housing units at an average density of 689.7 per square mile (266.3/km^{2}). The racial makeup of the city was 98.0% White, 1.0% Asian, and 1.0% from two or more races.

There were 187 households, of which 25.7% had children under the age of 18 living with them, 52.9% were married couples living together, 11.8% had a female householder with no husband present, 3.7% had a male householder with no wife present, and 31.6% were non-families. 29.4% of all households were made up of individuals, and 11.8% had someone living alone who was 65 years of age or older. The average household size was 2.16 and the average family size was 2.61.

The median age in the city was 48.9 years. 19.3% of residents were under the age of 18; 4.4% were between the ages of 18 and 24; 21.1% were from 25 to 44; 30.7% were from 45 to 64; and 24.5% were 65 years of age or older. The gender makeup of the city was 48.3% male and 51.7% female.

=== 2000 census ===
As of the census of 2000, there were 412 people, 185 households, and 123 families living in the city. The population density was 1,399.9 inhabitants per square mile (540.5/km^{2}). There were 198 housing units at an average density of 672.8 per square mile (259.8/km^{2}). The racial makeup of the city was 100.00% White.

There were 185 households, out of which 24.3% had children under the age of 18 living with them, 60.0% were married couples living together, 4.9% had a female householder with no husband present, and 33.5% were non-families. 33.5% of all households were made up of individuals, and 21.6% had someone living alone who was 65 years of age or older. The average household size was 2.23 and the average family size was 2.81.

In the city, the population was spread out, with 20.1% under the age of 18, 5.3% from 18 to 24, 23.1% from 25 to 44, 26.2% from 45 to 64, and 25.2% who were 65 years of age or older. The median age was 46 years. For every 100 females, there were 88.1 males. For every 100 females age 18 and over, there were 84.8 males.

The median income for a household in the city was $33,068, and the median income for a family was $41,750. Males had a median income of $31,667 versus $17,396 for females. The per capita income for the city was $16,638. About 4.6% of families and 5.2% of the population were below the poverty line, including 1.1% of those under age 18 and 11.1% of those age 65 or over.

== Education ==
Edgewood–Colesburg Community School District operates public schools.
