= Masonville, Iowa =

- City
- Location of Masonville, Iowa
- Coordinates: 42°28′47″N 91°35′29″W
- Country: United States
- State: Iowa
- County: Delaware
- Incorporated: June 28, 1901

Area
  - Total: 0.33 sq mi (0.85 km^{2})
  - Land: 0.33 sq mi (0.85 km^{2})
  - Water: 0 sq mi (0.00 km^{2})
- Elevation: 1,017 ft (310 m)

Population (2020)
  - Total: 99
  - Density: 302.7/sq mi (116.88/km^{2})
- Time zone: UTC-6 (Central (CST))
  - Summer (DST): UTC-5 (CDT)
- ZIP code: 50654
- Area code: 563
- FIPS code: 19-50205
- GNIS feature ID: 2395041

Masonville is a city in Delaware County, Iowa, United States. The population was 99 at the time of the 2020 census. The city is located on the western border between Delaware and Buchanan counties.

== History ==
Masonville was laid out in 1858. It was named for businessman R. B. Mason.

== Geography ==
According to the United States Census Bureau, the city has a total area of 0.33 square miles (0.85 km^{2}), all land.

== Demographics ==
Historical populations
Year	Pop.	±%
1910	282	—
1920	250	−11.3%
1930	207	−17.2%
1940	176	−15.0%
1950	133	−24.4%
1960	168	+26.3%
1970	147	−12.5%
1980	150	+2.0%
1990	129	−14.0%
2000	104	−19.4%
2010	127	+22.1%
2020	99	−22.0%
Source:"U.S. Census website". United States Census Bureau. and Iowa Data Center; Source: U.S. Decennial Census

=== 2020 census ===
As of the census of 2020, there were 99 people, 47 households, and 33 families residing in the city. The population density was 302.7 inhabitants per square mile (116.9/km^{2}). There were 51 housing units at an average density of 155.9 per square mile (60.2/km^{2}). The racial makeup of the city was 100.0% White, 0.0% Black or African American, 0.0% Native American, 0.0% Asian, 0.0% Pacific Islander, 0.0% from other races and 0.0% from two or more races. Hispanic or Latino persons of any race comprised 1.0% of the population.

Of the 47 households, 27.7% of which had children under the age of 18 living with them, 53.2% were married couples living together, 8.5% were cohabitating couples, 12.8% had a female householder with no spouse or partner present and 25.5% had a male householder with no spouse or partner present. 29.8% of all households were non-families. 27.7% of all households were made up of individuals, 6.4% had someone living alone who was 65 years old or older.

The median age in the city was 45.1 years. 24.2% of the residents were under the age of 20; 4.0% were between the ages of 20 and 24; 21.2% were from 25 and 44; 27.3% were from 45 and 64; and 23.2% were 65 years of age or older. The gender makeup of the city was 49.5% male and 50.5% female.

=== 2010 census ===
As of the census of 2010, there were 127 people, 55 households, and 36 families living in the city. The population density was 384.8 inhabitants per square mile (148.6/km^{2}). There were 57 housing units at an average density of 172.7 per square mile (66.7/km^{2}). The racial makeup of the city was 96.9% White and 3.1% from two or more races. Hispanic or Latino of any race were 0.8% of the population.

There were 55 households, of which 25.5% had children under the age of 18 living with them, 52.7% were married couples living together, 9.1% had a female householder with no husband present, 3.6% had a male householder with no wife present, and 34.5% were non-families. 27.3% of all households were made up of individuals, and 3.6% had someone living alone who was 65 years of age or older. The average household size was 2.31 and the average family size was 2.83.

The median age in the city was 40.5 years. 24.4% of residents were under the age of 18; 4.7% were between the ages of 18 and 24; 26% were from 25 to 44; 32.3% were from 45 to 64; and 12.6% were 65 years of age or older. The gender makeup of the city was 46.5% male and 53.5% female.

=== 2000 census ===
As of the census of 2000, there were 104 people, 49 households, and 32 families living in the city. The population density was 315.3 inhabitants per square mile (121.7/km^{2}). There were 55 housing units at an average density of 166.8 per square mile (64.4/km^{2}). The racial makeup of the city was 99.04% White, and 0.96% from two or more races. Hispanic or Latino of any race were 4.81% of the population.

There were 49 households, out of which 18.4% had children under the age of 18 living with them, 44.9% were married couples living together, 18.4% had a female householder with no husband present, and 32.7% were non-families. 26.5% of all households were made up of individuals, and 18.4% had someone living alone who was 65 years of age or older. The average household size was 2.12 and the average family size was 2.42.

In the city, the population was spread out, with 14.4% under the age of 18, 18.3% from 18 to 24, 26.0% from 25 to 44, 26.9% from 45 to 64, and 14.4% who were 65 years of age or older. The median age was 41 years. For every 100 females, there were 67.7 males. For every 100 females age 18 and over, there were 81.6 males.

The median income for a household in the city was $32,000, and the median income for a family was $40,625. Males had a median income of $30,313 versus $16,667 for females. The per capita income for the city was $20,166. There were 3.0% of families and 5.1% of the population living below the poverty line, including no under eighteens and 15.4% of those over 64.

== Education ==
The West Delaware County Community School District operates local area public schools.
