= Greeley, Iowa =

- City
- Location of Greeley, Iowa
- Coordinates: 42°35′6″N 91°20′30″W
- Country: United States
- State: Iowa
- County: Delaware
- Incorporated: July 8, 1892

Area
  - Total: 0.37 sq mi (0.97 km^{2})
  - Land: 0.37 sq mi (0.97 km^{2})
  - Water: 0 sq mi (0.00 km^{2})
- Elevation: 1,148 ft (350 m)

Population (2020)
  - Total: 217
  - Density: 578.7/sq mi (223.43/km^{2})
- Time zone: UTC-6 (Central (CST))
  - Summer (DST): UTC-5 (CDT)
- ZIP code: 52050
- Area code: 563
- FIPS code: 19-32610
- GNIS feature ID: 2394971

Greeley is a city in Delaware County, Iowa, United States. The population was 217 at the time of the 2020 census.

== History ==
Greeley was platted in 1855 and was named after Horace Greeley. The town of Greeley experienced growth in the 1870s when the Davenport and St. Paul Railroad was built through the settlement. Home of the Tug of War team Powertrain. This team was started around 1970s and has since traveled the world to compete against other international teams. This team has represented USA for years. Recently competing in the Tug of War World Cup in Switzerland.

== Geography ==
According to the United States Census Bureau, the city has a total area of 0.37 square miles (0.96 km^{2}), all land.

== Demographics ==
Historical populations
Year	Pop.	±%
1900	488	—
1910	383	−21.5%
1920	410	+7.0%
1930	343	−16.3%
1940	403	+17.5%
1950	360	−10.7%
1960	369	+2.5%
1970	323	−12.5%
1980	313	−3.1%
1990	284	−9.3%
2000	276	−2.8%
2010	256	−7.2%
2020	217	−15.2%
Source:"U.S. Census website". United States Census Bureau. and Iowa Data Center; Source: U.S. Decennial Census

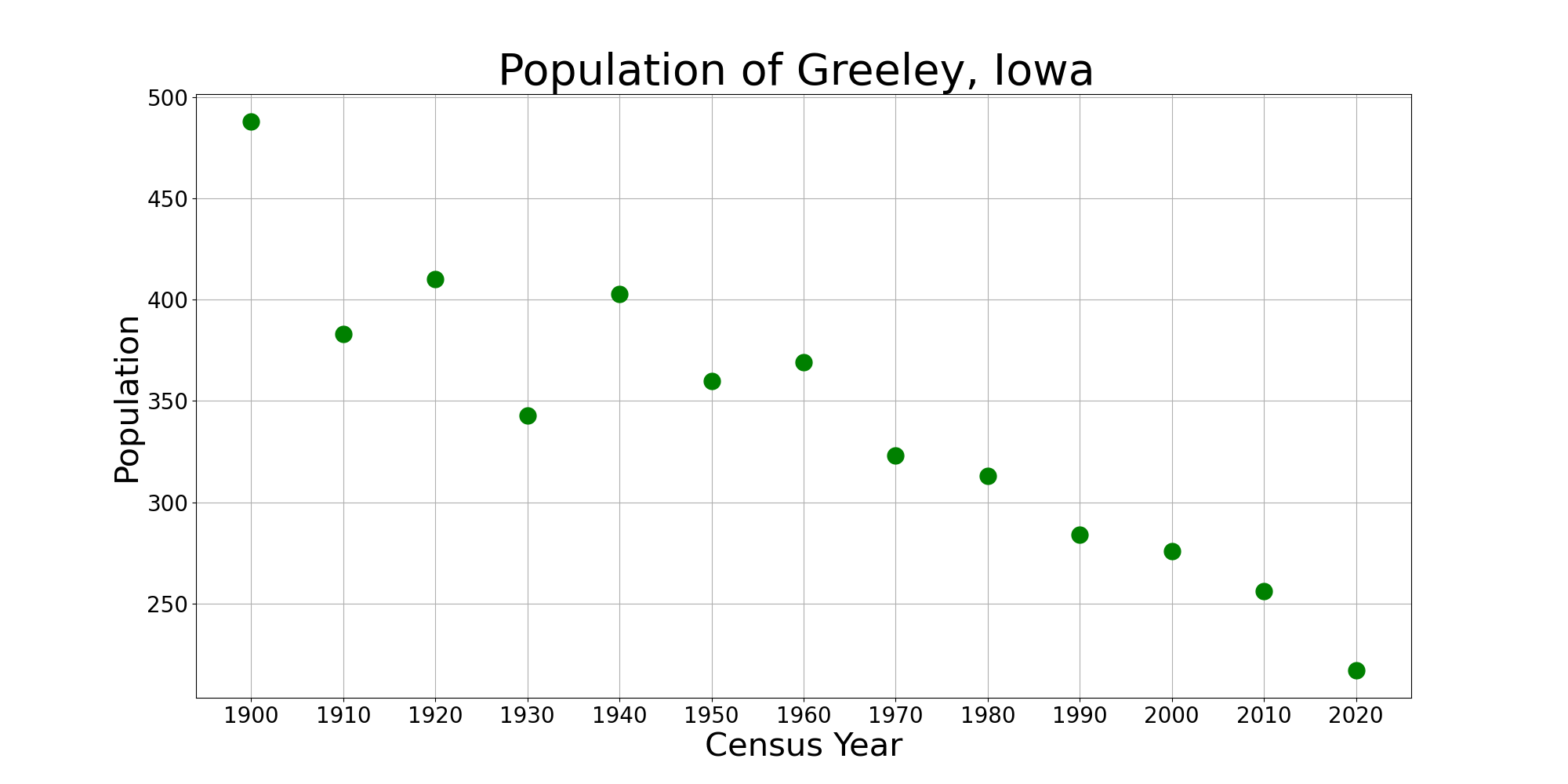
The population of Greeley, Iowa from US census data

=== 2020 census ===
As of the census of 2020, there were 217 people, 97 households, and 73 families residing in the city. The population density was 578.7 inhabitants per square mile (223.4/km^{2}). There were 102 housing units at an average density of 272.0 per square mile (105.0/km^{2}). The racial makeup of the city was 98.2% White, 0.0% Black or African American, 0.0% Native American, 0.0% Asian, 0.0% Pacific Islander, 0.5% from other races and 1.4% from two or more races. Hispanic or Latino persons of any race comprised 0.9% of the population.

Of the 97 households, 27.8% of which had children under the age of 18 living with them, 54.6% were married couples living together, 6.2% were cohabitating couples, 22.7% had a female householder with no spouse or partner present and 16.5% had a male householder with no spouse or partner present. 24.7% of all households were non-families. 21.6% of all households were made up of individuals, 11.3% had someone living alone who was 65 years old or older.

The median age in the city was 40.9 years. 21.7% of the residents were under the age of 20; 8.3% were between the ages of 20 and 24; 26.3% were from 25 and 44; 26.7% were from 45 and 64; and 17.1% were 65 years of age or older. The gender makeup of the city was 51.2% male and 48.8% female.

=== 2010 census ===
As of the census of 2010, there were 256 people, 101 households, and 71 families residing in the city. The population density was 691.9 inhabitants per square mile (267.1/km^{2}). There were 108 housing units at an average density of 291.9 per square mile (112.7/km^{2}). The racial makeup of the city was 100.0% White.

There were 101 households, of which 28.7% had children under the age of 18 living with them, 51.5% were married couples living together, 14.9% had a female householder with no husband present, 4.0% had a male householder with no wife present, and 29.7% were non-families. 17.8% of all households were made up of individuals, and 7% had someone living alone who was 65 years of age or older. The average household size was 2.53 and the average family size was 2.89.

The median age in the city was 40 years. 21.9% of residents were under the age of 18; 11.7% were between the ages of 18 and 24; 22.7% were from 25 to 44; 29.3% were from 45 to 64; and 14.5% were 65 years of age or older. The gender makeup of the city was 44.5% male and 55.5% female.

=== 2000 census ===
As of the census of 2000, there were 276 people, 112 households, and 84 families residing in the city. The population density was 729.7 inhabitants per square mile (281.7/km^{2}). There were 118 housing units at an average density of 312.0 per square mile (120.5/km^{2}). The racial makeup of the city was 100.00% White. Hispanic or Latino of any race were 0.36% of the population.

There were 112 households, out of which 26.8% had children under the age of 18 living with them, 58.0% were married couples living together, 11.6% had a female householder with no husband present, and 25.0% were non-families. 23.2% of all households were made up of individuals, and 13.4% had someone living alone who was 65 years of age or older. The average household size was 2.46 and the average family size was 2.86.

In the city, the population was spread out, with 22.1% under the age of 18, 8.0% from 18 to 24, 27.2% from 25 to 44, 26.8% from 45 to 64, and 15.9% who were 65 years of age or older. The median age was 41 years. For every 100 females, there were 90.3 males. For every 100 females age 18 and over, there were 92.0 males.

The median income for a household in the city was $35,000, and the median income for a family was $41,250. Males had a median income of $28,750 versus $19,500 for females. The per capita income for the city was $15,508. About 9.1% of families and 10.2% of the population were below the poverty line, including 15.6% of those under the age of eighteen and 4.8% of those 65 or over.

== Education ==
The West Delaware County Community School District operates local area public schools.

== Windfarm ==
Located primarily to the west of Greeley, a 41 Megawatt (MW) windfarm was constructed in 2011. The Elk windfarm is owned by RPM Access and consists of 17 Nordex 2.5 MW turbines mounted on 100 meters (330 feet) tall towers. Central Iowa Power Cooperative is purchasing the power generated by the project under a 20-year power purchase agreement and is distributing the power to its member Cooperatives.
