= Sand Springs, Iowa =

- Unincorporated community
- Location within Iowa
- Coordinates: 42°19′03″N 91°11′22″W
- Country: United States
- State: Iowa
- County: Delaware
- Elevation: 922 ft (281 m)
- Time zone: UTC-6 (Central (CST))
  - Summer (DST): UTC-5 (CDT)
- Area code: 563
- GNIS feature ID: 461406

Sand Springs is an unincorporated community in South Fork Township, Delaware County, Iowa, United States. The community is on Iowa Highway 38, 3.5 miles (5.6 km) east-southeast of Hopkinton.

== History ==
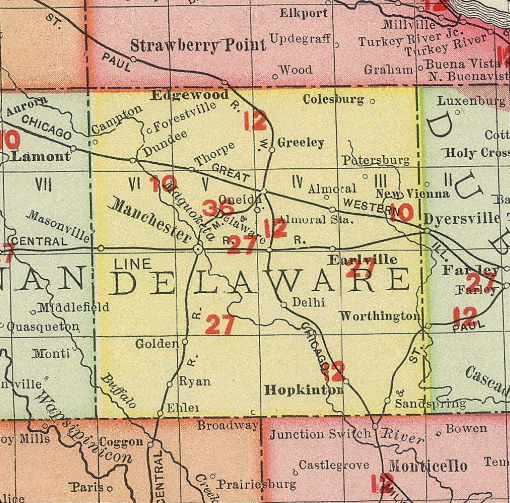
Sand Springs in southeastern Delaware County, Iowa, in 1903

The first cabin at Sand Springs (originally Sand Spring, without the 's') was built by Asa Bowen in 1852. In 1856, the Southwestern (Milwaukee) Railway was surveyed in this area, and a railroad station was eventually established. Sand Spring was platted by surveyor George Welch for landowners L.H. Langworthy and T.H. Bowen.

The Sand Spring post office opened in 1858, the same year a hotel was built. A Methodist church was built in 1865, and a Baptist church was completed in 1868. A large school was constructed in 1868. The rail line was completed in 1859, with the help of townsfolk (including women) who pitched in to help lay the tracks. However, a railroad line built in nearby Hopkinton was said to have diminished Sand Springs' economics, and a 1914 history of the county called Sand Spring "primitive" and past its heyday. Sand Spring did not prosper and remained a village.

During its peak years, Sand Spring was home to a broom factory and a sawmill; the sawmill was destroyed during the flood of 1865.

Sand Springs' population was 52 in 1925. The Sand Springs post office closed in April 1945. The population was 63 in 1940.
