= Oneida, Iowa =

- Unincorporated community
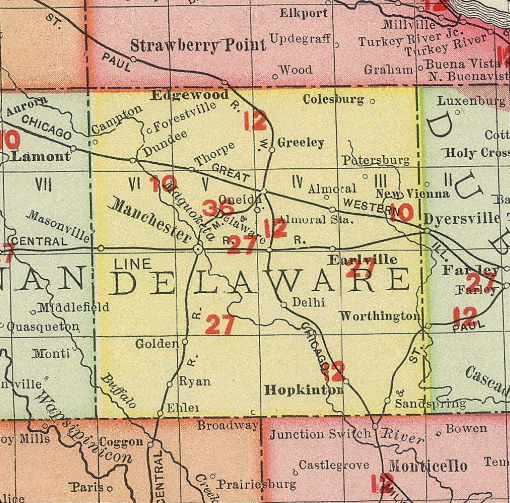
- Oneida in north-central Delaware County, Iowa, in 1903

- Location within Iowa
- Coordinates: 42°32′34″N 91°21′13″W
- Country: United States
- State: Iowa
- County: Delaware
- Elevation: 1,053 ft (321 m)
- Time zone: UTC-6 (Central (CST))
  - Summer (DST): UTC-5 (CDT)
- Zip: 52067
- Area code: 563
- GNIS feature ID: 459866

Oneida is an unincorporated community and former city in Oneida Township, Delaware County, Iowa, United States. The community is on county highway D13, 3 miles (4.8 km) south of Greeley.

== History ==
A post office opened in Oneida in 1887 and operated until 1963. Oneida's population was 27 in 1902, and 127 in 1925.

Oneida was incorporated from May 29, 1912 until 1994.

== Demographics ==
Historical population
Census	Pop.	Note	%±
1920	127		—
1930	101		−20.5%
1940	84		−16.8%
1950	75		−10.7%
1960	76		1.3%
1970	55		−27.6%
1980	61		10.9%
1990	49		−19.7%
U.S. Decennial Census

== See also ==
- List of Discontinued cities in Iowa
