= Delhi, Iowa =

- City
- Location of Delhi, Iowa
- Coordinates: 42°25′49″N 91°19′51″W
- Country: United States
- State: Iowa
- County: Delaware

Area
  - Total: 1.00 sq mi (2.59 km^{2})
  - Land: 0.95 sq mi (2.46 km^{2})
  - Water: 0.054 sq mi (0.14 km^{2})
- Elevation: 1,024 ft (312 m)

Population (2020)
  - Total: 420
  - Density: 442.9/sq mi (171.02/km^{2})
- Time zone: UTC-6 (Central (CST))
  - Summer (DST): UTC-5 (CDT)
- ZIP code: 52223
- Area code: 563
- FIPS code: 19-19675
- GNIS feature ID: 2394501
- Website: www.delhiia.com

Delhi /ˈdɛlhaɪ/ DEL-hy is a city in Delaware County, Iowa, United States. The population was 420 at the time of the 2020 census.

== History ==
Delhi was founded in the early 1840s. The county seat was once located there. Emma Swinburne, who married George C. Junkin, was from Delhi.

== Geography ==
Delhi is located on State Highway 38 near the Maquoketa River. The Delhi Dam on the river in Delhi's southwest created Hartwick Lake. A portion of the dam failed on July 24, 2010, flooding areas downstream.

According to the United States Census Bureau, the city has a total area of 1.02 square miles (2.64 km^{2}), of which 0.97 square miles (2.51 km^{2}) is land and 0.05 square miles (0.13 km^{2}) is water.

== Demographics ==
Historical populations
Year	Pop.	±%
1870	413	—
1880	524	+26.9%
1890	442	−15.6%
1900	362	−18.1%
1910	375	+3.6%
1920	390	+4.0%
1930	399	+2.3%
1940	421	+5.5%
1950	383	−9.0%
1960	464	+21.1%
1970	527	+13.6%
1980	511	−3.0%
1990	485	−5.1%
2000	458	−5.6%
2010	460	+0.4%
2020	420	−8.7%
Source:"U.S. Census website". United States Census Bureau. and Iowa Data Center; Source: U.S. Decennial Census

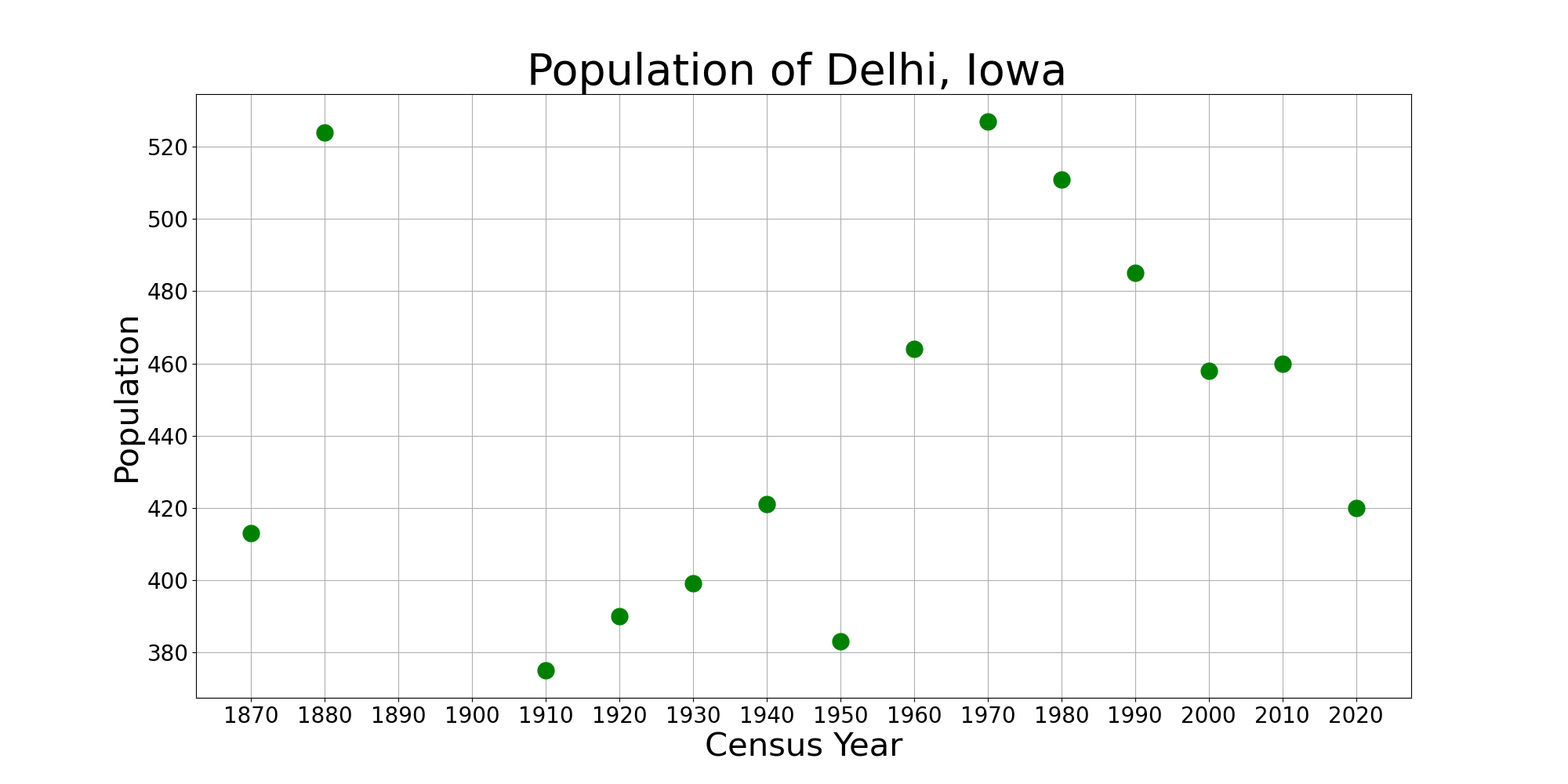
The population of Delhi, Iowa from US census data

=== 2020 census ===
As of the census of 2020, there were 420 people, 195 households, and 111 families residing in the city. The population density was 442.9 inhabitants per square mile (171.0/km^{2}). There were 212 housing units at an average density of 223.6 per square mile (86.3/km^{2}). The racial makeup of the city was 97.1% White, 0.7% Black or African American, 0.0% Native American, 0.0% Asian, 0.0% Pacific Islander, 0.2% from other races and 1.9% from two or more races. Hispanic or Latino persons of any race comprised 1.2% of the population.

Of the 195 households, 23.1% of which had children under the age of 18 living with them, 46.7% were married couples living together, 6.7% were cohabitating couples, 25.1% had a female householder with no spouse or partner present and 21.5% had a male householder with no spouse or partner present. 43.1% of all households were non-families. 36.4% of all households were made up of individuals, 14.4% had someone living alone who was 65 years old or older.

The median age in the city was 43.5 years. 24.8% of the residents were under the age of 20; 3.8% were between the ages of 20 and 24; 24.8% were from 25 and 44; 27.9% were from 45 and 64; and 18.8% were 65 years of age or older. The gender makeup of the city was 48.3% male and 51.7% female.

=== 2010 census ===
As of the census of 2010, there were 460 people, 206 households, and 130 families living in the city. The population density was 474.2 inhabitants per square mile (183.1/km^{2}). There were 225 housing units at an average density of 232.0 per square mile (89.6/km^{2}). The racial makeup of the city was 99.1% White and 0.9% from two or more races. Hispanic or Latino of any race were 0.7% of the population.

There were 206 households, of which 27.2% had children under the age of 18 living with them, 47.1% were married couples living together, 11.2% had a female householder with no husband present, 4.9% had a male householder with no wife present, and 36.9% were non-families. 30.6% of all households were made up of individuals, and 13.6% had someone living alone who was 65 years of age or older. The average household size was 2.23 and the average family size was 2.77.

The median age in the city was 44.6 years. 23.5% of residents were under the age of 18; 3.7% were between the ages of 18 and 24; 23.5% were from 25 to 44; 32% were from 45 to 64; and 17.4% were 65 years of age or older. The gender makeup of the city was 48.9% male and 51.1% female.

=== 2000 census ===
As of the census of 2000, there were 458 people, 199 households, and 130 families living in the city. The population density was 470.8 inhabitants per square mile (181.8/km^{2}). There were 218 housing units at an average density of 224.1 per square mile (86.5/km^{2}). The racial makeup of the city was 99.56% White, 0.00% African American, 0.22% Asian, and 0.22% from two or more races. 0.22% of the population were Hispanic or Latino of any race.

There were 199 households, out of which 26.6% had children under the age of 18 living with them, 54.3% were married couples living together, 7.0% had a female householder with no husband present, and 34.2% were non-families. 28.1% of all households were made up of individuals, and 15.1% had someone living alone who was 65 years of age or older. The average household size was 2.30 and the average family size was 2.77.

In the city, the population was spread out, with 22.3% under the age of 18, 7.2% from 18 to 24, 27.7% from 25 to 44, 22.5% from 45 to 64, and 20.3% who were 65 years of age or older. The median age was 42 years. For every 100 females, there were 96.6 males. For every 100 females age 18 and over, there were 100.0 males.

The median income for a household in the city was $38,636, and the median income for a family was $46,607. Males had a median income of $34,167 versus $21,375 for females. The per capita income for the city was $19,751. About 6.7% of families and 5.7% of the population were below the poverty line, including 4.2% of those under age 18 and 10.8% of those age 65 or over.

== Education ==
The Maquoketa Valley Community School District operates local area public schools.
