= Robinson, Iowa =

- Unincorporated community
- Location in Iowa Robinson (the United States)
- Coordinates: 42°20′31″N 91°34′44″W
- Country: United States
- State: Iowa
- County: Delaware County
- Time zone: UTC-6 (Central (CST))
  - Summer (DST): UTC-5 (CDT)

Robinson is an unincorporated community in Delaware County, Iowa, United States.

== Geography ==
Robinson is located at the junction of County Highway D47 and 310th Street, five miles west of Ryan and three miles southeast of Monti, at 42.340037N, -91.578738W.

== History ==
Robinson was founded in 1912, named after the Robinson family of southwestern Delaware County. The post office at Robinson was established on April 5, 1913. The postmistress was Mary Irene Robinson.

Around the time of its founding, Robinson was home to two general stores, two hardware stores, a bank, a blacksmith shop, a restaurant, a harness shop, a lumber yard, a pool hall, a grain elevator, and a newspaper (the Robinson Herald).

Alexander Robinson, one prominent Robinson, built a farm 1.5 miles north of the townsite. William B. Robinson operated the Farmers Savings Bank of Robinson and the Robinson Lumber and Grain Company, circa 1914. The Chicago, Anamosa and Northern Railroad (CAN) passed through Robinson, built in 1912 and proposed for electrification in 1916.

The Robinson post office closed in 1916.

Robinson's population was 30 in 1940. The CAN Railway was sold for scrap during World War II.

== See also ==
- Monti, Iowa
