= Earlville, Iowa =

- City
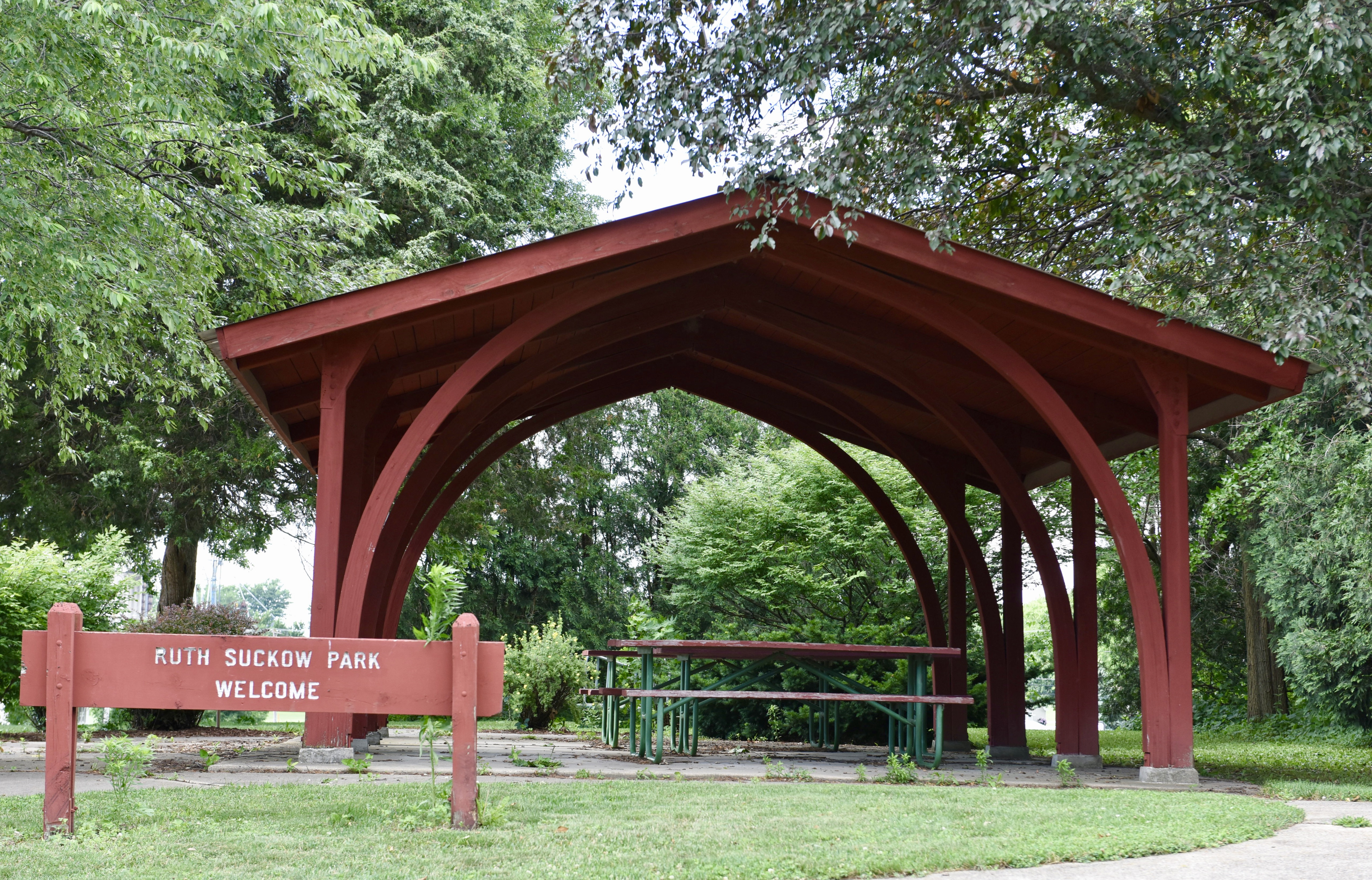
- Ruth Suckow Park

- Location of Earlville, Iowa
- Coordinates: 42°28′58″N 91°16′12″W
- Country: United States
- State: Iowa
- County: Delaware
- Incorporated: June 12, 1882

Area
  - Total: 0.55 sq mi (1.43 km^{2})
  - Land: 0.55 sq mi (1.43 km^{2})
  - Water: 0 sq mi (0.00 km^{2})
- Elevation: 1,001 ft (305 m)

Population (2020)
  - Total: 716
  - Density: 1,300.2/sq mi (502.01/km^{2})
- Time zone: UTC-6 (Central (CST))
  - Summer (DST): UTC-5 (CDT)
- ZIP code: 52041
- Area code: 563
- FIPS code: 19-23430
- GNIS feature ID: 2394594

Earlville is a city in Delaware County, Iowa, United States. The population was 716 at the time of the 2020 census.

== History ==
Earlville got its start in the year 1857, following construction of the railroad through that territory. It is named for its first settler, George M. Earl. A post office opened in Earlville in 1858.

== Geography ==
According to the United States Census Bureau, the city has a total area of 0.55 square miles (1.42 km^{2}), all land.

== Demographics ==
Historical populations
Year	Pop.	±%
1890	569	—
1900	618	+8.6%
1910	552	−10.7%
1920	619	+12.1%
1930	615	−0.6%
1940	687	+11.7%
1950	661	−3.8%
1960	668	+1.1%
1970	751	+12.4%
1980	844	+12.4%
1990	822	−2.6%
2000	900	+9.5%
2010	812	−9.8%
2020	716	−11.8%
Source:"U.S. Census website". United States Census Bureau. and Iowa Data Center; Source: U.S. Decennial Census

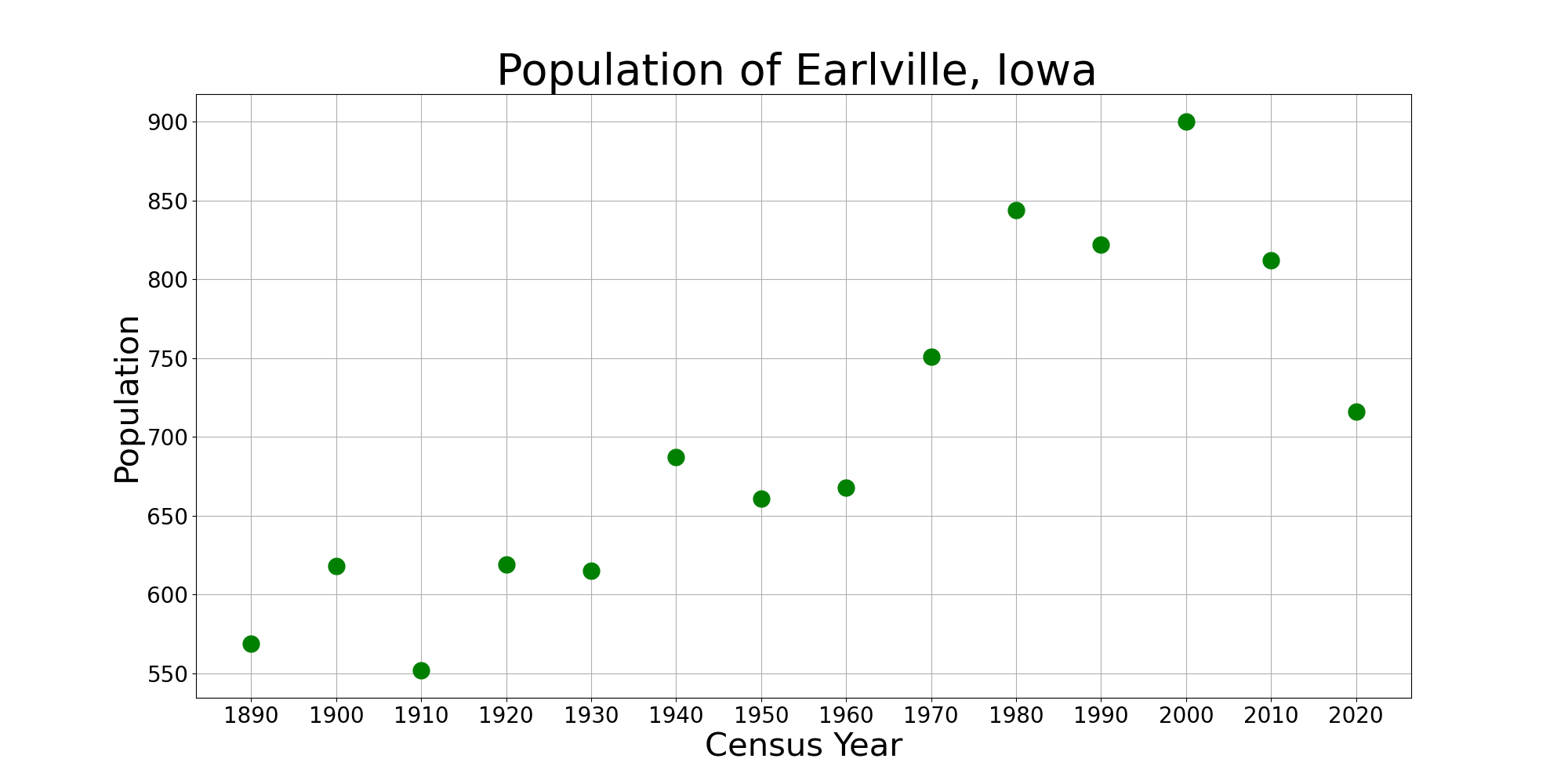
The population of Earlville, Iowa from US census data

=== 2020 census ===
As of the census of 2020, there were 716 people, 320 households, and 204 families residing in the city. The population density was 1,300.2 inhabitants per square mile (502.0/km^{2}). There were 339 housing units at an average density of 615.6 per square mile (237.7/km^{2}). The racial makeup of the city was 96.4% White, 0.1% Black or African American, 0.1% Native American, 0.7% Asian, 0.0% Pacific Islander, 0.8% from other races and 1.8% from two or more races. Hispanic or Latino persons of any race comprised 2.2% of the population.

Of the 320 households, 26.6% of which had children under the age of 18 living with them, 52.8% were married couples living together, 5.9% were cohabitating couples, 22.5% had a female householder with no spouse or partner present and 18.8% had a male householder with no spouse or partner present. 36.2% of all households were non-families. 31.9% of all households were made up of individuals, 13.1% had someone living alone who was 65 years old or older.

The median age in the city was 44.9 years. 23.5% of the residents were under the age of 20; 4.6% were between the ages of 20 and 24; 22.1% were from 25 and 44; 30.0% were from 45 and 64; and 19.8% were 65 years of age or older. The gender makeup of the city was 49.9% male and 50.1% female.

=== 2010 census ===
As of the census of 2010, there were 812 people, 331 households, and 236 families residing in the city. The population density was 1,476.4 inhabitants per square mile (570.0/km^{2}). There were 354 housing units at an average density of 643.6 per square mile (248.5/km^{2}). The racial makeup of the city was 98.6% White, 0.1% Asian, 0.6% from other races, and 0.6% from two or more races. Hispanic or Latino of any race were 2.5% of the population.

There were 331 households, of which 31.1% had children under the age of 18 living with them, 59.2% were married couples living together, 7.6% had a female householder with no husband present, 4.5% had a male householder with no wife present, and 28.7% were non-families. 24.2% of all households were made up of individuals, and 11.8% had someone living alone who was 65 years of age or older. The average household size was 2.45 and the average family size was 2.90.

The median age in the city was 42.3 years. 23.8% of residents were under the age of 18; 6.2% were between the ages of 18 and 24; 23.7% were from 25 to 44; 28.5% were from 45 to 64; and 17.6% were 65 years of age or older. The gender makeup of the city was 49.9% male and 50.1% female.

=== 2000 census ===
As of the census of 2000, there were 900 people, 338 households, and 248 families residing in the city. The population density was 1,648.0 inhabitants per square mile (636.3/km^{2}). There were 355 housing units at an average density of 650.0 per square mile (251.0/km^{2}). The racial makeup of the city was 98.78% White, 0.11% African American, 0.33% Native American, 0.22% Asian, 0.33% from other races, and 0.22% from two or more races. Hispanic or Latino of any race were 1.11% of the population.

There were 338 households, out of which 36.7% had children under the age of 18 living with them, 60.4% were married couples living together, 8.3% had a female householder with no husband present, and 26.6% were non-families. 21.9% of all households were made up of individuals, and 13.0% had someone living alone who was 65 years of age or older. The average household size was 2.66 and the average family size was 3.13.

In the city, the population was spread out, with 30.0% under the age of 18, 7.3% from 18 to 24, 27.9% from 25 to 44, 18.8% from 45 to 64, and 16.0% who were 65 years of age or older. The median age was 37 years. For every 100 females, there were 98.7 males. For every 100 females age 18 and over, there were 97.5 males.

The median income for a household in the city was $38,194, and the median income for a family was $43,333. Males had a median income of $30,398 versus $20,625 for females. The per capita income for the city was $14,855. About 6.0% of families and 6.6% of the population were below the poverty line, including 6.7% of those under age 18 and 8.1% of those age 65 or over.

== Education ==
The Maquoketa Valley Community School District operates local area public schools. St. Joseph School, under the Roman Catholic Archdiocese of Dubuque, was in Earlville.
