= Maquoketa River =

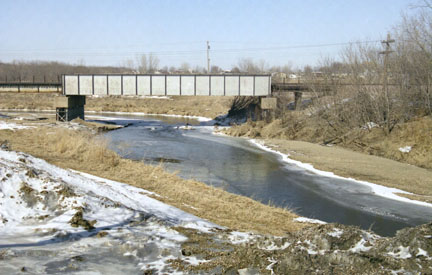
- The North Fork of the Maquoketa River at Dyersville, Iowa in 1996

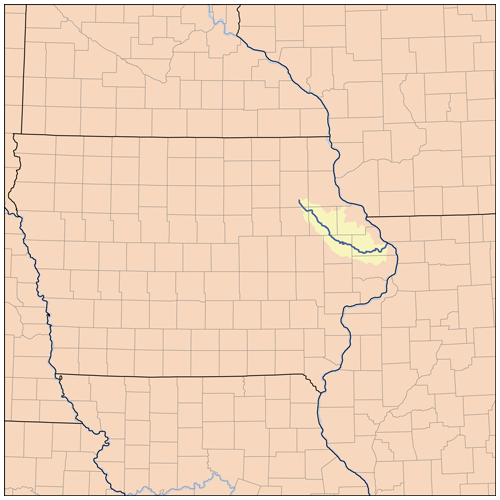
- Maquoketa River highlighted
- Etymology: Maquaw-Autaw, "Bear River" in Meskwaki

Location
- Country: United States
- State: Iowa

Physical characteristics
- Source
  - coordinates: 42°43′08″N 91°42′39″W
- Mouth: Mississippi River
  - elevation: 591 ft (180 m)
- Length: 150 mi (240 km)
- Discharge
  - location: Maquoketa, Iowa
  - average: 1,141 cu/ft. per sec.

The Maquoketa River (/məˈkoʊkɪtə/) is a tributary of the Mississippi River, approximately 150 miles (240 km) long, in northeastern Iowa in the United States. Its watershed covers 1,694 square miles (4,387 km^{2}) within a rural region of rolling hills and farmland southwest of Dubuque. The river and its tributaries mark the border of the Driftless Area of Iowa, with the areas east of it not having been covered by ice during the last ice age. Its name derives from Maquaw-Autaw, which means "Bear River" in Meskwaki.

== Course ==
The Maquoketa rises in southeastern Fayette County just southwest of Arlington in Fairfield Township, and approximately 10 miles (16 km) east of Oelwein. It flows briefly northeastward, then generally southeastward through Clayton, Delaware, Jones and Jackson Counties, through Backbone State Park and the towns of Dundee, Manchester and Monticello.

At Maquoketa, it receives the North Fork Maquoketa River from the north; the North Fork rises in northern Dubuque County and flows 96 miles (154 km) generally southward past Dyersville and Cascade. The Maquoketa then flows generally eastward in a meandering course as it approaches the Mississippi. It enters Pool 13 of the Mississippi from the southwest in eastern Jackson County a few miles upstream from Sabula approximately 30 mi (48 km) southeast of Dubuque.

The river is considered one of the best smallmouth bass and trout fisheries in Iowa.

== Dams ==
There are four small dams on the river:

- Delhi Dam (the USGS terms it, Hartwick Dam) impounds 400-acre (1.6 km^{2}) Lake Delhi downriver from Manchester in Delaware County. On Saturday July 24, 2010, the dam at Lake Delhi failed due to heavy rains and the rapid rise of the Maquoketa River. The dam has since been reconstructed.
- The Mon-Maq dam in Jones County just east of Monticello was once used to generate power for the town and is now a candidate for dam removal
- The Backbone Lake dam in Backbone State Park.
- The Lakehurst dam at Maquoketa.

== Recreation ==
The stretch of river from just below the Mon-Maq dam to Iowa Highway 136 is one of Iowa's most popular canoe trips. Along much of this stretch, the river flows through a canyon bounded by steep cliffs of Silurian dolomite. Large tracts of surrounding land are open to the public, including the Pictured Rocks Wildlife Management Area (1,138 acres, cooperatively managed by Jones County and the Iowa DNR, and the Indian Bluffs Primitive Area State Preserve (845 acres, privately owned, managed by the Iowa DNR). The canyon walls in Pictured Rocks make it one of the most popular rock climbing areas in Eastern Iowa, with numerous routs and pre-set anchors for climbing ropes; the highest rock face is 75 feet (23m).

Maquoketa Caves State Park, a few miles upstream from Maquoketa protects a segment of the Driftless Area's karst topography, characterized by caves, ice caves and sinkholes.

Manchester Whitewater Park is a whitewater course in downtown Manchester, spanning over 800 feet long and including several drop features. The park opened in June 2015.

== Major events ==
In 1944, the river flooded with a historic discharge of 48,000 cubic feet per second. Several of the Maquoketa Caves were inundated with the water carving holes up to eight feet deep and damaging the lighting system. Repairs were complete over several years when the park opened again in 1949.

== See also ==
- List of rivers of Iowa
