= Dundee, Iowa =

- City
- Location of Dundee, Iowa
- Coordinates: 42°34′45″N 91°32′47″W
- Country: United States
- State: Iowa
- County: Delaware
- Incorporated: August 30, 1917

Area
  - Total: 0.32 sq mi (0.82 km^{2})
  - Land: 0.32 sq mi (0.82 km^{2})
  - Water: 0 sq mi (0.00 km^{2})
- Elevation: 997 ft (304 m)

Population (2020)
  - Total: 198
  - Density: 628.4/sq mi (242.63/km^{2})
- Time zone: UTC-6 (Central (CST))
  - Summer (DST): UTC-5 (CDT)
- ZIP code: 52038
- Area code: 563
- FIPS code: 19-22800
- GNIS feature ID: 2394574

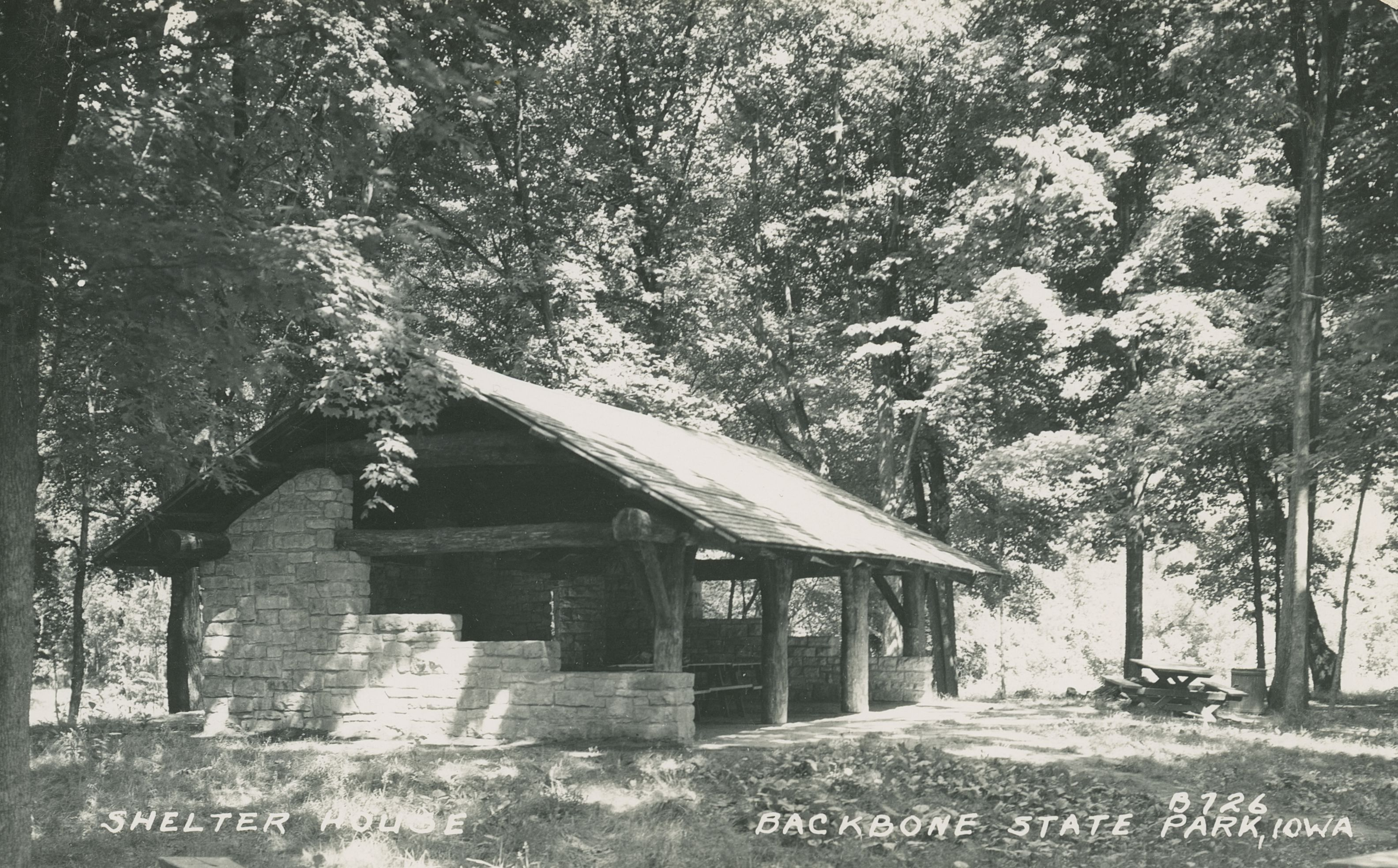
Backbone State Park, Dundee, Iowa

Dundee is a city in Delaware County, Iowa, United States. The population was 198 at the time of the 2020 census.

== Geography ==
Dundee is located along the Maquoketa River.

Dundee was established in 1887.

According to the United States Census Bureau, the city has a total area of 0.36 square miles (0.93 km^{2}), all land.

== Demographics ==
Historical populations
Year	Pop.	±%
1920	195	—
1930	190	−2.6%
1940	193	+1.6%
1950	176	−8.8%
1960	185	+5.1%
1970	166	−10.3%
1980	164	−1.2%
1990	174	+6.1%
2000	179	+2.9%
2010	174	−2.8%
2020	198	+13.8%
Source:"U.S. Census website". United States Census Bureau. and Iowa Data Center; Source: U.S. Decennial Census

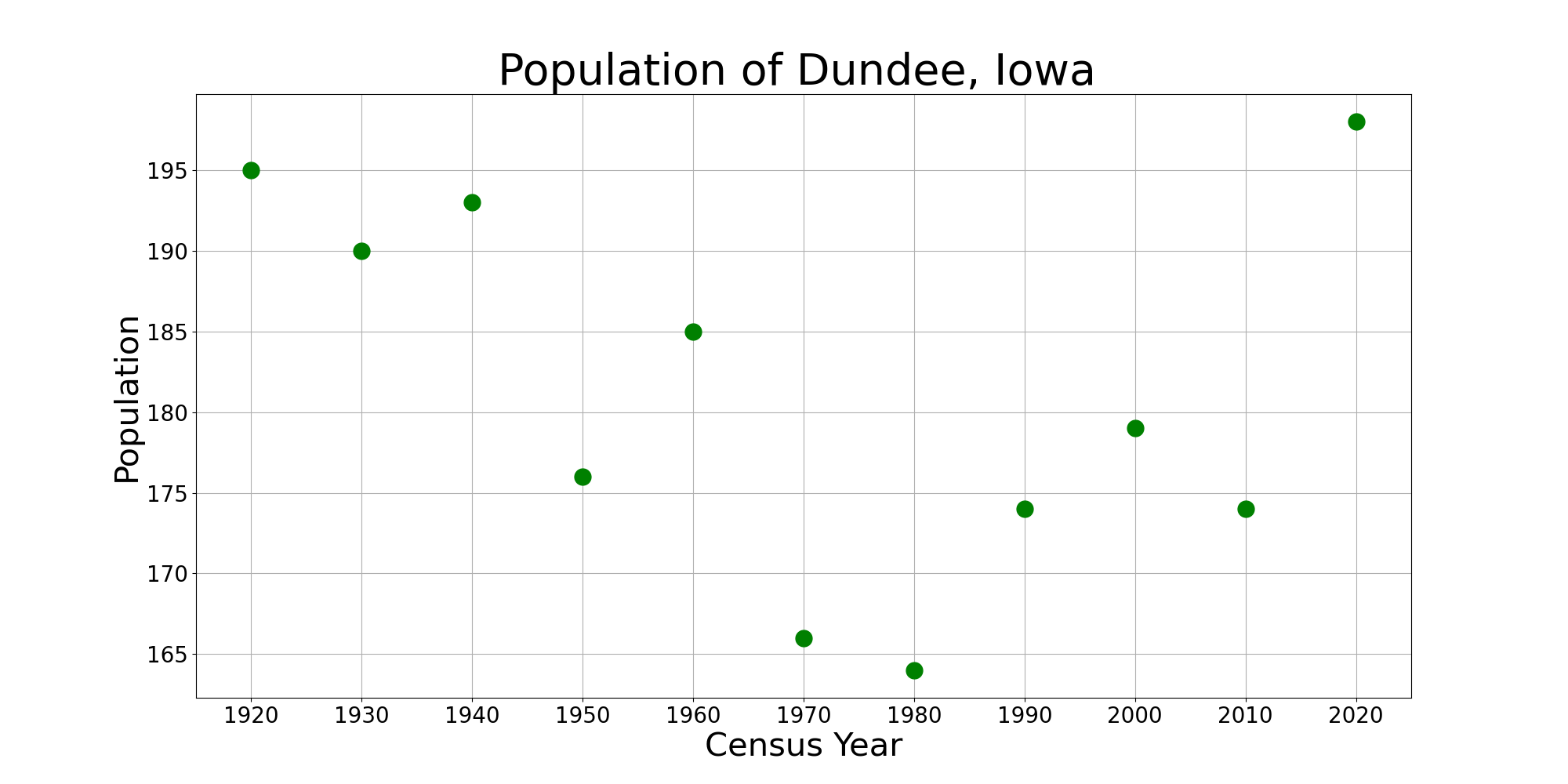
The population of Dundee, Iowa from US census data

=== 2020 census ===
As of the census of 2020, there were 198 people, 79 households, and 57 families residing in the city. The population density was 628.4 inhabitants per square mile (242.6/km^{2}). There were 82 housing units at an average density of 260.2 per square mile (100.5/km^{2}). The racial makeup of the city was 95.5% White, 0.0% Black or African American, 3.0% Native American, 1.0% Asian, 0.0% Pacific Islander, 0.0% from other races and 0.5% from two or more races. Hispanic or Latino persons of any race comprised 3.0% of the population.

Of the 79 households, 44.3% of which had children under the age of 18 living with them, 58.2% were married couples living together, 6.3% were cohabitating couples, 16.5% had a female householder with no spouse or partner present and 19.0% had a male householder with no spouse or partner present. 27.8% of all households were non-families. 19.0% of all households were made up of individuals, 10.1% had someone living alone who was 65 years old or older.

The median age in the city was 31.0 years. 30.8% of the residents were under the age of 20; 5.1% were between the ages of 20 and 24; 28.3% were from 25 and 44; 24.7% were from 45 and 64; and 11.1% were 65 years of age or older. The gender makeup of the city was 51.5% male and 48.5% female.

=== 2010 census ===
As of the census of 2010, there were 174 people, 79 households, and 40 families living in the city. The population density was 483.3 inhabitants per square mile (186.6/km^{2}). There were 88 housing units at an average density of 244.4 per square mile (94.4/km^{2}). The racial makeup of the city was 100.0% White. Hispanic or Latino of any race were 1.7% of the population.

There were 79 households, of which 29.1% had children under the age of 18 living with them, 39.2% were married couples living together, 3.8% had a female householder with no husband present, 7.6% had a male householder with no wife present, and 49.4% were non-families. 43.0% of all households were made up of individuals, and 20.3% had someone living alone who was 65 years of age or older. The average household size was 2.20 and the average family size was 3.00.

The median age in the city was 37.3 years. 25.3% of residents were under the age of 18; 5.1% were between the ages of 18 and 24; 28.7% were from 25 to 44; 19.6% were from 45 to 64; and 21.3% were 65 years of age or older. The gender makeup of the city was 52.9% male and 47.1% female.

=== 2000 census ===
As of the census of 2000, there were 179 people, 80 households, and 54 families living in the city. The population density was 441.7 inhabitants per square mile (170.5/km^{2}). There were 88 housing units at an average density of 217.2 per square mile (83.9/km^{2}). The racial makeup of the city was 100.00% White.

There were 80 households, out of which 25.0% had children under the age of 18 living with them, 66.3% were married couples living together, and 32.5% were non-families. 28.8% of all households were made up of individuals, and 17.5% had someone living alone who was 65 years of age or older. The average household size was 2.24 and the average family size was 2.72.

In the city, the population was spread out, with 22.3% under the age of 18, 3.4% from 18 to 24, 26.8% from 25 to 44, 25.7% from 45 to 64, and 21.8% who were 65 years of age or older. The median age was 43 years. For every 100 females, there were 86.5 males. For every 100 females age 18 and over, there were 87.8 males.

The median income for a household in the city was $26,719, and the median income for a family was $30,000. Males had a median income of $25,625 versus $19,583 for females. The per capita income for the city was $13,531. About 8.3% of families and 9.8% of the population were below the poverty line, including 4.9% of those under the age of eighteen and 21.7% of those 65 or over.

== Education ==
The West Delaware County Community School District operates local area public schools.
