= Ryan, Iowa =

- City
- Location of Ryan, Iowa
- Coordinates: 42°21′08″N 91°29′06″W
- Country: United States
- State: Iowa
- County: Delaware

Area
  - Total: 0.44 sq mi (1.13 km^{2})
  - Land: 0.44 sq mi (1.13 km^{2})
  - Water: 0 sq mi (0.00 km^{2})
- Elevation: 997 ft (304 m)

Population (2020)
  - Total: 350
  - Density: 800/sq mi (308.8/km^{2})
- Time zone: UTC-6 (Central (CST))
  - Summer (DST): UTC-5 (CDT)
- ZIP code: 52330
- Area code: 563
- FIPS code: 19-69465
- GNIS feature ID: 2396463

Ryan is a city in Delaware County, Iowa, United States. The population was 350 at the time of the 2020 census.

== Geography ==
According to the United States Census Bureau, the city has a total area of 0.43 square miles (1.11 km^{2}), all land.

== History ==
Ryan was platted by Arthur I. Flint, J. A. Thomas, and Andrew E. Anderson on August 28, 1888 within Adams Township. The city was incorporated in 1901.

On August 12, 1974, an F4 tornado swept through Ryan, destroying much of the southern part of the community, and injuring 12 people. The tornado severely damaged homes as well as Great Plains Lumber Company, St. Patrick's Catholic Church, and the West Delaware grade school. It was estimated that the tornado caused $2.5 million in damage.

Since the Iowa Highway 13 bypass was constructed, the city has annexed a small portion of land east of Adams Street (which follows the township line) from Hazel Green Township.

On July 26, 2026, the not-for-profit organization Ryan Meetup held a gathering of people with the first name Ryan. Approximately 70 Ryans attended the event. It featured live music from the Ryan-fronted band Pogo Moose Incident and a ceremony to officially change the name of the World's Largest Umpire to Ryan.

== Demographics ==
Historical populations
Year	Pop.	±%
1910	511	—
1920	397	−22.3%
1930	369	−7.1%
1940	341	−7.6%
1950	362	+6.2%
1960	347	−4.1%
1970	343	−1.2%
1980	390	+13.7%
1990	382	−2.1%
2000	410	+7.3%
2010	361	−12.0%
2020	350	−3.0%
Source:"U.S. Census website". United States Census Bureau. and Iowa Data Center; Source: U.S. Decennial Census

=== 2020 census ===
As of the census of 2020, there were 350 people, 149 households, and 96 families residing in the city. The population density was 799.8 inhabitants per square mile (308.8/km^{2}). There were 165 housing units at an average density of 377.0 per square mile (145.6/km^{2}). The racial makeup of the city was 96.6% White, 0.6% Black or African American, 0.0% Native American, 0.0% Asian, 0.0% Pacific Islander, 0.0% from other races and 2.9% from two or more races. Hispanic or Latino persons of any race comprised 1.4% of the population.

Of the 149 households, 30.9% of which had children under the age of 18 living with them, 51.7% were married couples living together, 6.0% were cohabitating couples, 22.1% had a female householder with no spouse or partner present and 20.1% had a male householder with no spouse or partner present. 35.6% of all households were non-families. 32.9% of all households were made up of individuals, 14.8% had someone living alone who was 65 years old or older.

The median age in the city was 41.8 years. 25.7% of the residents were under the age of 20; 4.3% were between the ages of 20 and 24; 23.1% were from 25 and 44; 25.7% were from 45 and 64; and 21.1% were 65 years of age or older. The gender makeup of the city was 51.4% male and 48.6% female.

=== 2010 census ===
As of the census of 2010, there were 361 people, 152 households, and 93 families living in the city. The population density was 839.5 inhabitants per square mile (324.1/km^{2}). There were 171 housing units at an average density of 397.7 per square mile (153.6/km^{2}). The racial makeup of the city was 99.2% White and 0.8% from two or more races.

There were 152 households, of which 28.9% had children under the age of 18 living with them, 52.6% were married couples living together, 4.6% had a female householder with no husband present, 3.9% had a male householder with no wife present, and 38.8% were non-families. 32.9% of all households were made up of individuals, and 13.2% had someone living alone who was 65 years of age or older. The average household size was 2.38 and the average family size was 3.10.

The median age in the city was 37.9 years. 23.3% of residents were under the age of 18; 6.6% were between the ages of 18 and 24; 26.6% were from 25 to 44; 30.5% were from 45 to 64; and 13% were 65 years of age or older. The gender makeup of the city was 51.8% male and 48.2% female.

=== 2000 census ===
At the 2000 census, there were 410 people, 158 households and 97 families living in the city. The population density was 953.1 inhabitants per square mile (368.0/km^{2}). There were 170 housing units at an average density of 395.2 per square mile (152.6/km^{2}). The racial makeup of the city was 98.78% White, 0.73% from other races, and 0.49% from two or more races. Hispanic or Latino of any race were 0.73% of the population.

There were 158 households, of which 35.4% had children under the age of 18 living with them, 53.8% were married couples living together, 5.1% had a female householder with no husband present, and 38.0% were non-families. 32.9% of all households were made up of individuals, and 15.8% had someone living alone who was 65 years of age or older. The average household size was 2.59 and the average family size was 3.47.

32.2% of the population were under the age of 18, 6.8% from 18 to 24, 30.0% from 25 to 44, 18.5% from 45 to 64, and 12.4% who were 65 years of age or older. The median age was 33 years. For every 100 females, there were 104.0 males. For every 100 females age 18 and over, there were 104.4 males.

The median household income was $34,250 and the median family incomewas $42,813. Males had a median income of $30,250 versus $21,417 for females. The per capita income for the city was $14,576. About 7.5% of families and 8.7% of the population were below the poverty line, including 9.6% of those under age 18 and 6.1% of those age 65 or over.

== Education ==
The West Delaware County Community School District operates local area public schools.

== Notable sites ==
Happy Chef Umpire Roadside America
