= York, Iowa =

Former community in Delaware County, Iowa, US

- ghost town
- Location within Iowa Location within the United States
- Coordinates: 42°38′04″N 91°26′36″W
- Country: United States
- State: Iowa
- County: Delaware
- Elevation: 1,109 ft (338 m)
- Time zone: UTC-6 (Central (CST))
  - Summer (DST): UTC-5 (CDT)
- Area code: 563
- GNIS feature ID: 464158

York is a former townsite in Honey Creek Township, Delaware County, Iowa, United States. The community was at the junction of Ivy Road and 180th Avenue, southwest of Edgewood.

== History ==
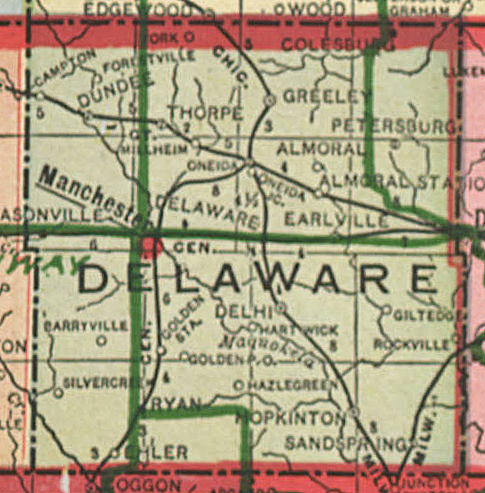
York was in northern Delaware County, Iowa, in 1917.

The York post office opened on December 12, 1855, with George W. Stewart as postmaster. That year, he platted the community of York.

York was soon home to several mercantiles, and in 1873, a schoolhouse was built at the edge of the community. Future growth of York was planned, but the townfolk's hopes were dashed when the Davenport and St. Paul Railroad bypassed York in favor of nearby Edgewood. The Chicago Great Western Railway similarly bypassed York for nearby Thorpe.

The York post office closed on November 17, 1875.

By 1914, a history of the county called York a "defunct town". York still appeared on maps in the early 20th century, but with decreasing frequency.

The schoolhouse at York became known as the Little York School. York School served as a voting site as late as 1939.

Today, the site of York is still marked by a few farms.
