= Delaware County, Iowa =

County in Iowa, United States

- County
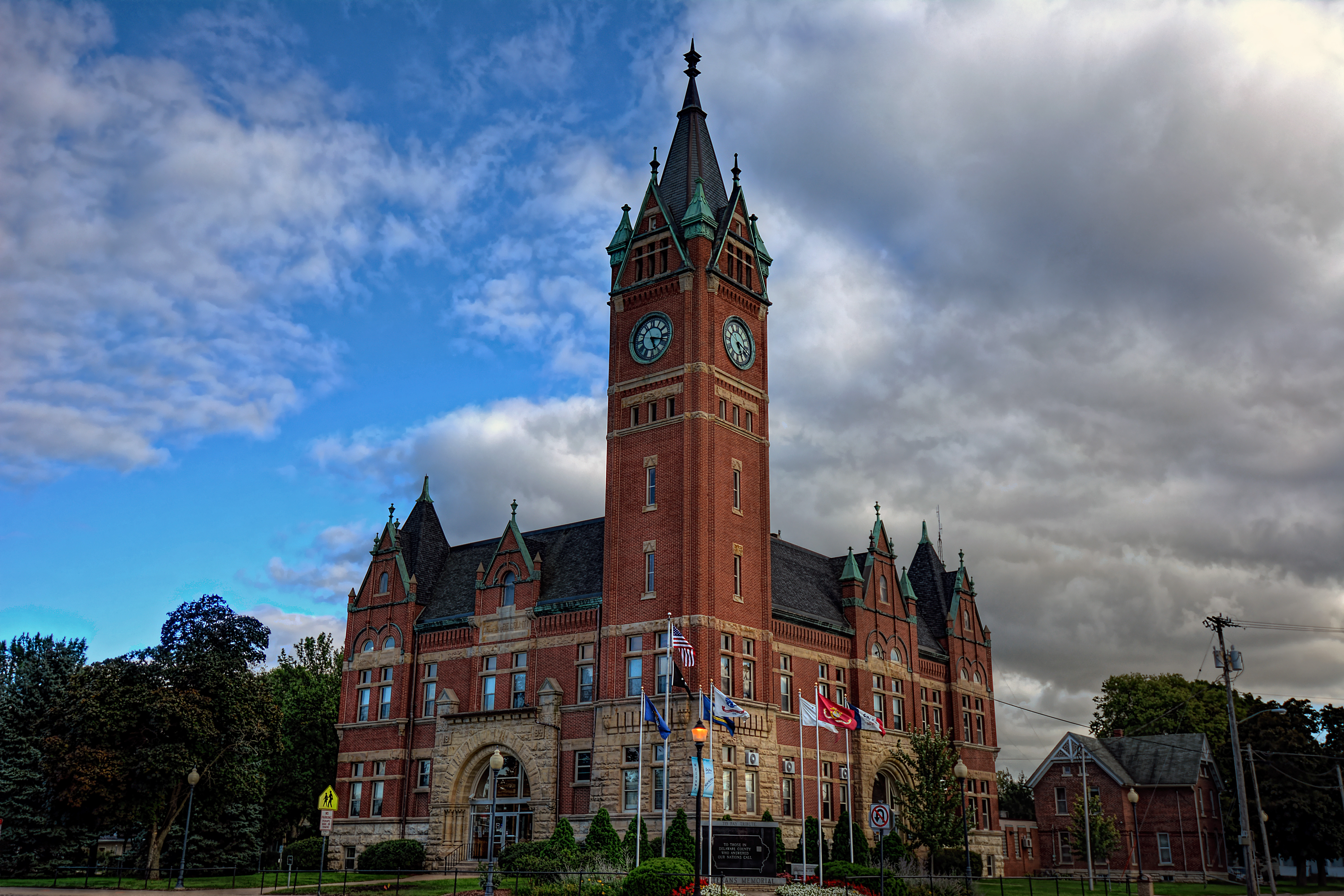
- The Delaware County Courthouse in Manchester

- Location within the U.S. state of Iowa
- Coordinates: 42°28′10″N 91°22′13″W
- Country: United States
- State: Iowa
- Founded: December 21, 1837 (created); February 8, 1844 (organized)
- Named for: State of Delaware
- Seat: Manchester
- Largest city: Manchester

Area
  - Total: 579 sq mi (1,500 km^{2})
  - Land: 578 sq mi (1,500 km^{2})
  - Water: 1.2 sq mi (3.1 km^{2}) 0.2%

Population (2020)
  - Total: 17,488
  - Estimate (2025): 17,674 ▲
  - Density: 30.3/sq mi (11.7/km^{2})
- Time zone: UTC−6 (Central)
  - Summer (DST): UTC−5 (CDT)
- Congressional district: 2nd
- Website: delawarecounty.iowa.gov
- Iowa county number 28

Delaware County is a county located in the U.S. state of Iowa. As of the 2020 census, the population was 17,488. The county seat is Manchester. The county takes its name after the U.S. state of Delaware.

== Geography ==
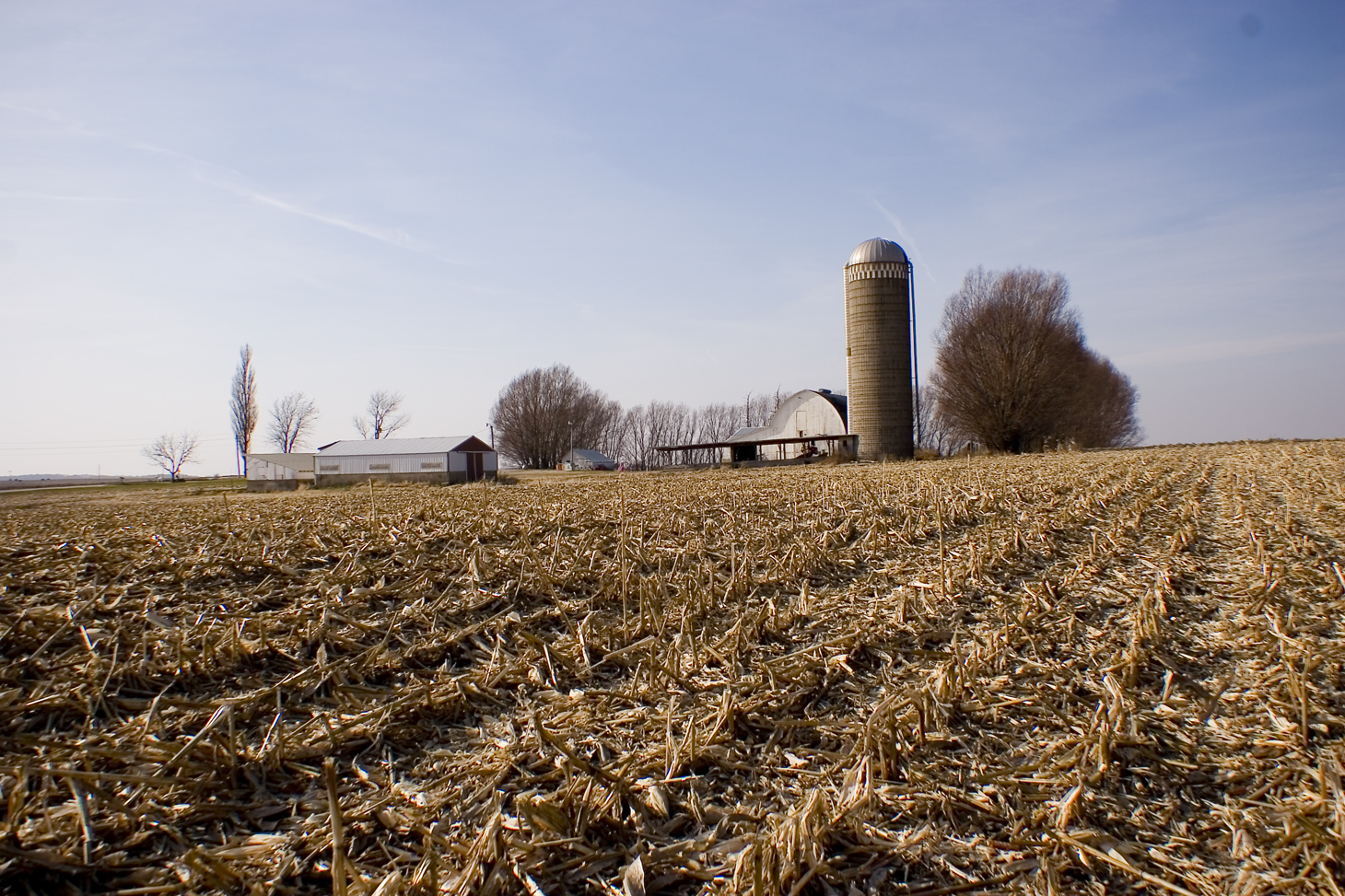
A farm near Hopkinton

According to the U.S. Census Bureau, the county has a total area of 579 square miles (1,500 km^{2}), of which 578 square miles (1,500 km^{2}) is land and 1.2 square miles (3.1 km^{2}) (0.2%) is water. It has a rough hilly surface.

=== Major highways ===
- U.S. Highway 20
- Iowa Highway 3
- Iowa Highway 13
- Iowa Highway 38

=== Adjacent counties ===
- Buchanan County (west)
- Clayton County (north)
- Dubuque County (east)
- Fayette County (northwest)
- Jones County (southeast)
- Linn County (southwest)

== Demographics ==
Historical population
Census	Pop.	Note	%±
1850	1,759		—
1860	11,024		526.7%
1870	17,432		58.1%
1880	17,950		3.0%
1890	17,349		−3.3%
1900	19,185		10.6%
1910	17,888		−6.8%
1920	18,183		1.6%
1930	18,122		−0.3%
1940	18,487		2.0%
1950	17,734		−4.1%
1960	18,483		4.2%
1970	18,770		1.6%
1980	18,933		0.9%
1990	18,035		−4.7%
2000	18,404		2.0%
2010	17,764		−3.5%
2020	17,488		−1.6%
2025 (est.)	17,674	▲	1.1%
U.S. Decennial Census; 1790–1960 1900–1990; 1990–2000 2010–2020

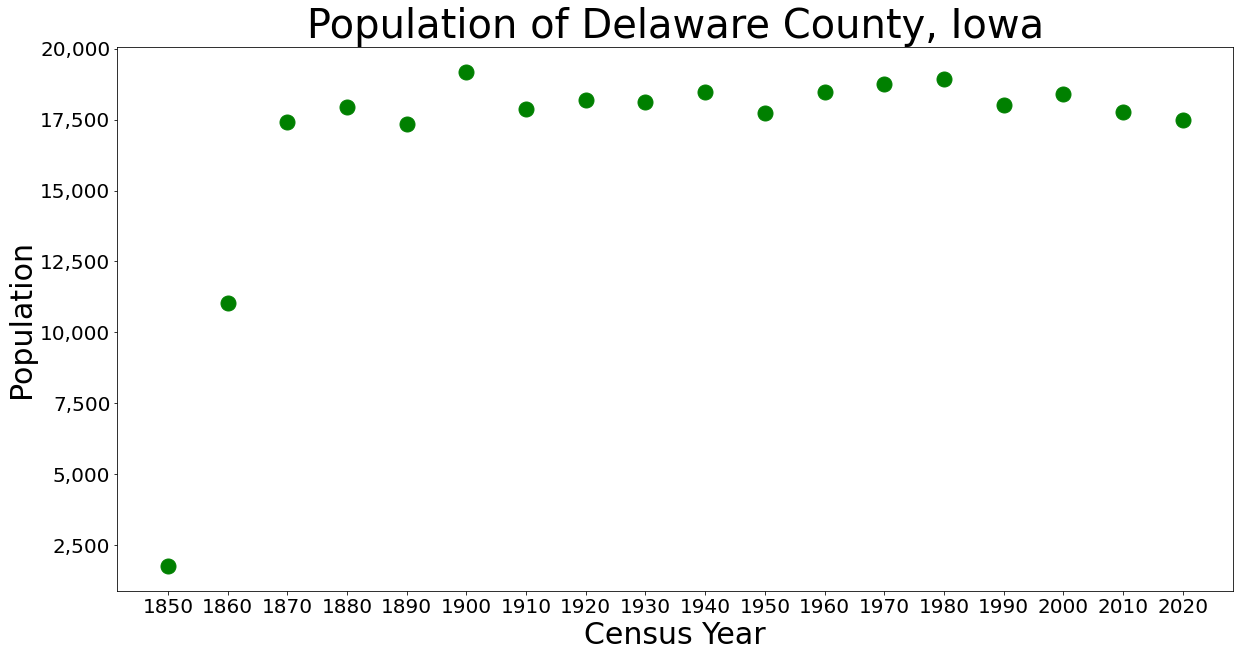
Population of Delaware County from US census data

=== 2020 census ===
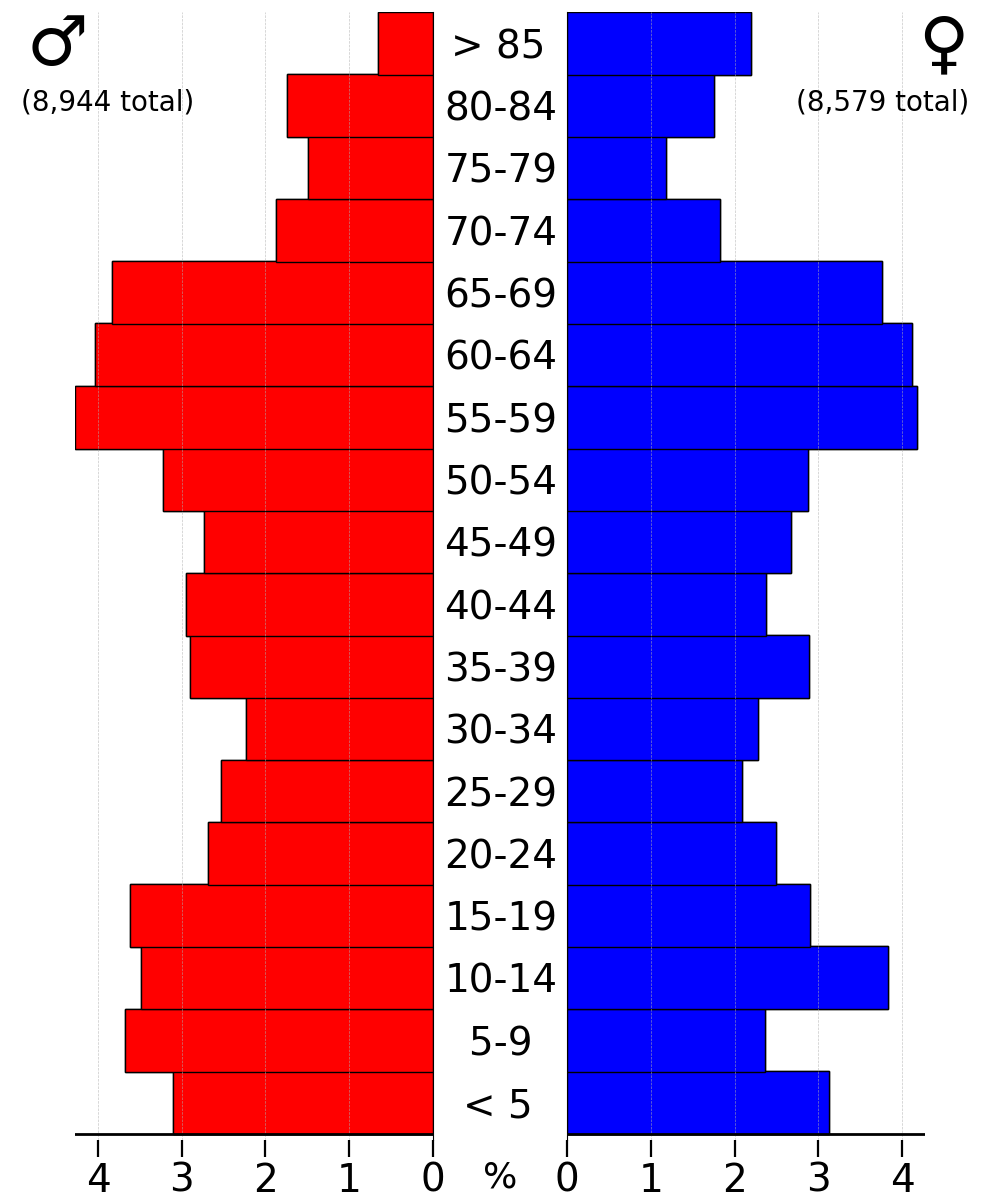
2022 US Census population pyramid for Delaware County from ACS 5-year estimates

As of the 2020 census, the county had a population of 17,488, resulting in a population density of 30.2/sq mi (11.7/km^{2}).

As of the 2020 census, the median age was 43.5 years. 23.6% of residents were under the age of 18 and 20.5% of residents were 65 years of age or older. For every 100 females there were 101.8 males, and for every 100 females age 18 and over there were 99.6 males age 18 and over.

As of the 2020 census, the racial makeup of the county was 96.0% White, 0.7% Black or African American, 0.3% American Indian and Alaska Native, 0.3% Asian, <0.1% Native Hawaiian and Pacific Islander, 0.5% from some other race, and 2.3% from two or more races; Hispanic or Latino residents of any race comprised 1.4% of the population. 97.75% of residents reported being of one race, including 94.60% who were non-Hispanic White and 0.70% who were Black or African American, while 2.74% reported being some other race or more than one race.

As of the 2020 census, 28.1% of residents lived in urban areas, while 71.9% lived in rural areas.

As of the 2020 census, there were 7,141 households in the county, of which 27.8% had children under the age of 18 living in them. Of all households, 57.4% were married-couple households, 17.8% were households with a male householder and no spouse or partner present, and 19.7% were households with a female householder and no spouse or partner present. About 27.5% of all households were made up of individuals and 13.0% had someone living alone who was 65 years of age or older. There were 8,100 housing units, of which 11.8% were vacant, leaving 7,141 occupied units; among the occupied units, 80.2% were owner-occupied and 19.8% were renter-occupied. The homeowner vacancy rate was 1.6% and the rental vacancy rate was 6.8%.

=== 2010 census ===
The 2010 census recorded a population of 17,764 in the county, with a population density of 30.7/sq mi (11.9/km^{2}). There were 8,028 housing units, of which 7,062 were occupied.

=== 2000 census ===
As of the census of 2000, there were 18,404 people, 6,834 households, and 5,029 families residing in the county. The population density was 32 people per square mile (12 people/km^{2}). There were 7,682 housing units at an average density of 13 units per square mile (5.0 units/km^{2}). The racial makeup of the county was 99.28% White, 0.07% Black or African American, 0.10% Native American, 0.14% Asian, 0.01% Pacific Islander, 0.10% from other races, and 0.30% from two or more races. 0.66% of the population were Hispanic or Latino of any race.

There were 6,834 households, out of which 36.70% had children under the age of 18 living with them, 64.10% were married couples living together, 6.20% had a female householder with no husband present, and 26.40% were non-families. 23.00% of all households were made up of individuals, and 11.20% had someone living alone who was 65 years of age or older. The average household size was 2.66 and the average family size was 3.15.

In the county, the population was spread out, with 29.00% under the age of 18, 7.00% from 18 to 24, 27.60% from 25 to 44, 21.50% from 45 to 64, and 15.00% who were 65 years of age or older. The median age was 37 years. For every 100 females there were 98.40 males. For every 100 females age 18 and over, there were 96.60 males.

The median income for a household in the county was $37,168, and the median income for a family was $43,607. Males had a median income of $30,712 versus $19,685 for females. The per capita income for the county was $17,327. About 6.30% of families and 7.90% of the population were below the poverty line, including 8.50% of those under age 18 and 9.80% of those age 65 or over.

== Communities ==
=== Cities ===
- Colesburg
- Delaware
- Delhi
- Dundee
- Dyersville
- Earlville
- Edgewood
- Greeley
- Hopkinton
- Manchester
- Masonville
- Ryan

=== Townships ===
Delaware County is divided into these townships:

- Adams
- Bremen
- Coffins Grove
- Colony
- Delaware
- Delhi
- Elk
- Hazel Green
- Honey Creek
- Milo
- Prairie
- Richland
- South Fork
- North Fork
- Oneida
- Union

=== Unincorporated communities ===
- Almoral
- Ehler
- Forestville
- Golden
- Hartwick
- Hazel Green
- Oneida
- Petersburg
- Robinson
- Rockville
- Sand Springs
- Silver Creek
- Thorpe
- York

=== Population ranking ===
The population ranking of the following table is based on the 2020 census of Delaware County.

† county seat

Rank	City/Town/etc.	Municipal type	Population (2020 Census)
1	† Manchester	City	5,065
2	Dyersville (mostly in Dubuque County)	City	4,477
3	Edgewood (partially in Clayton County)	City	909
4	Earlville	City	716
5	Hopkinton	City	622
6	Delhi	City	420
7	Colesburg	City	386
8	Ryan	City	350
9	Greeley	City	217
10	Dundee	City	198
11	Delaware	City	142
12	Masonville	City	99

== Politics ==
United States presidential election results for Delaware County, Iowa
Year	Republican		Democratic		Third party(ies)	
Year	No.	%	No.	%	No.	%
1896	2,799	60.52%	1,778	38.44%	48	1.04%
1900	2,805	63.02%	1,570	35.27%	76	1.71%
1904	2,726	67.04%	1,236	30.40%	104	2.56%
1908	2,396	60.35%	1,471	37.05%	103	2.59%
1912	1,394	34.30%	1,399	34.42%	1,271	31.27%
1916	2,827	66.78%	1,332	31.47%	74	1.75%
1920	5,880	82.96%	1,111	15.67%	97	1.37%
1924	4,938	64.68%	1,146	15.01%	1,551	20.31%
1928	5,390	63.74%	3,043	35.99%	23	0.27%
1932	4,088	46.70%	4,559	52.08%	107	1.22%
1936	4,483	49.56%	4,350	48.09%	213	2.35%
1940	6,175	67.30%	2,985	32.53%	16	0.17%
1944	5,164	67.22%	2,498	32.52%	20	0.26%
1948	4,555	60.75%	2,876	38.36%	67	0.89%
1952	6,449	73.20%	2,351	26.69%	10	0.11%
1956	5,732	68.49%	2,621	31.32%	16	0.19%
1960	5,015	57.62%	3,688	42.38%	0	0.00%
1964	3,427	42.49%	4,623	57.32%	15	0.19%
1968	4,650	59.39%	2,760	35.25%	419	5.35%
1972	4,848	61.21%	2,944	37.17%	128	1.62%
1976	4,161	55.62%	3,168	42.35%	152	2.03%
1980	4,316	55.38%	2,671	34.27%	807	10.35%
1984	4,769	59.61%	3,158	39.47%	74	0.92%
1988	3,425	46.08%	3,947	53.11%	60	0.81%
1992	3,195	37.62%	3,093	36.42%	2,204	25.95%
1996	3,065	40.88%	3,704	49.41%	728	9.71%
2000	4,273	51.18%	3,808	45.61%	268	3.21%
2004	4,908	53.35%	4,227	45.95%	65	0.71%
2008	4,113	46.20%	4,649	52.22%	141	1.58%
2012	4,636	49.43%	4,616	49.22%	126	1.34%
2016	5,694	61.62%	2,957	32.00%	590	6.38%
2020	6,666	66.64%	3,157	31.56%	180	1.80%
2024	6,984	68.89%	2,978	29.37%	176	1.74%

== See also ==
- National Register of Historic Places listings in Delaware County, Iowa
