= Iowa Highway 38 =

State highway in Iowa, United States

Iowa Highway 38
- Iowa 38 highlighted in red

Route information
- Maintained by Iowa DOT
- Length: 98.941 mi (159.230 km)
- Existed: 1920–present

Major junctions
- South end: Iowa 92 / Great River Road in Muscatine
- US 61 / Iowa 22 / Iowa 92 in Muscatine; I-80 overlap near Wilton; US 30 overlap at Stanwood; US 151 at Monticello; US 20 at Delaware
- North end: Iowa 3 near Greeley

Location
- Country: United States
- State: Iowa
- Counties: Muscatine; Cedar; Jones; Delaware

Highway system
- Iowa Primary Highway System; Interstate; US; State; Secondary; Scenic
← Iowa 37	→ Iowa 39

Iowa Highway 38 (Iowa 38) is a 98-mile-long (158 km) state highway that runs through eastern Iowa. Iowa 38 begins at Iowa Highway 92 in Muscatine and ends at Iowa Highway 3 near Greeley.

== Route description ==
Iowa 38 begins in Muscatine at an intersection with Iowa 92 at the foot of the Norbert F. Beckey Bridge. Southwest of the junction, U.S. Highway 61 Business (US 61 Business) heads into the downtown and riverfront areas, while northeast of the junction, US 61 Business, Iowa 38, and Iowa 92 run together through a residential area. Shortly thereafter, Iowa 22 joins the two routes from the east. The intersection with U.S. Highway 61 (US 61) in northern Muscatine marks the end of US 61 Bus. Iowa 22 and Iowa 92 turn to the west along southbound US 61.

From Muscatine, Iowa 38 continues north eight miles (13 km) to the southern intersection with US 6 south of Wilton. Just north of Wilton, US 6 / Iowa 38 cross into Cedar County. Shortly thereafter, they intersect Interstate 80 (I-80) and split in opposite directions; US 6 splits to the east and Iowa 38 to the west. Iowa 38 overlaps I-80 from exit 267 to exit 271. From I-80, the highway continues north towards Tipton where it meets the western end of Iowa 130. North of Tipton, Iowa 38 overlaps US 30 for one mile (1.6 km), ending in Stanwood where Iowa 38 continues north.

Iowa 38 enters Jones County south of Olin and crosses the Wapsipinicon River on Olin's northern edge. Four miles (6.4 km) later, Iowa 38 intersects Iowa 64, which Iowa 38 overlaps for two miles (3.2 km) before heading north towards Monticello passing through Center Junction and Scotch Grove. Next to the Monticello Regional Airport, Iowa 38 meets US 151. Three-quarters mile (1.2 km) later, Iowa 38 meets and overlaps the former alignment of US 151, now US 151 Business. At First Street, it leaves US 151 Bus to the west for a few blocks before turning north again towards Hopkinton and crossing the Maquoketa River.

Just north of Sand Springs, Iowa 38 intersects County Road X47 (CR X47), which is a cutoff to eastbound US 20. From Hopkinton to Delhi, the highway is roughly parallel to the Maquoketa River. At Delaware, Iowa 38 intersects US 20. Iowa 38 briefly overlaps US 20's former routing, now CR D22, north of Delaware. Iowa 38 continues north through Greeley and ends three miles (4.8 km) north of Greeley at Iowa 3.

== History ==
Iowa 38 (No. 38) is an original state highway when the system was created in 1920. It extended from Primary Road No. 2 and No. 20 in Muscatine north to No. 61 between Anamosa and Wyoming. When the U.S. Highway System was created in 1926, the terminal roads of Iowa 38 were renumbered to Iowa 22 at Muscatine and Iowa 117 in Jones County. Throughout the 1930s, the highway was extended several times. Firstly, in 1932, it was extended over Iowa 117 for a couple miles and then north as a stub route to Center Junction. Three years later, it was again extended north to U.S. Highway 151 in Monticello. Finally on May 11, 1938, it absorbed all of Iowa 113, which had connected Monticello to Iowa 10 near Edgewood.

== Major intersections ==
County	Location	mi	km	Destinations	Notes
Muscatine	Muscatine	0.000	0.000	US 61 Bus. / Great River Road (2nd Street) Iowa 92 east – Illinois	Southern end of US 61 Business and Iowa 92 overlaps
Muscatine	Muscatine	0.717	1.154	Iowa 22 / Great River Road east (Washington Street) – Buffalo, Davenport	Southern end of Iowa 22 overlap
Muscatine	Muscatine	1.985	3.195	US 61 / Iowa 22 west / Iowa 92 west – Blue Grass, Wapello	End of US 61 Business; northern end of Iowa 22 and Iowa 92 overlaps
Muscatine	Moscow–Wilton township line	9.851	15.854	US 6 west – West Liberty	Southern end of US 6 overlap
Cedar	Sugar Creek Township	14.753	23.743	I-80 east (Exit 271) / US 6 east – Davenport	Northern end of US 6 overlap; southern end of I-80 overlap
Cedar	Rochester Township	18.892	30.404	I-80 west (Exit 267) – Des Moines	Northern end of I-80 overlap
Cedar	Tipton	28.169	45.334	Iowa 130 east (7th Street) – Bennett	
Cedar	Fremont–Dayton township line	36.271	58.373	US 30 east – De Witt	Southern end of US 30 overlap
Cedar	Stanwood	37.287	60.008	US 30 west (Front Street) – Mechanicsville, Cedar Rapids	Northern end of US 30 overlap
Jones	Jackson Township	50.046	80.541	Iowa 64 west – Anamosa	Southern end of Iowa 64 overlap
Jones	Madison Township	52.053	83.771	Iowa 64 east – Wyoming	Northern end of Iowa 64 overlap
Jones	Monticello	65.030	104.656	US 151 – Cedar Rapids, Dubuque	
Jones	Monticello	65.820	105.927	US 151 Bus. south (Main Street)	Southern end of US 151 Business overlap
Jones	Monticello	66.098	106.374	US 151 Bus. north (Main Street)	Northern end of US 151 Business overlap
Delaware	Delaware	87.387	140.636	US 20 – Waterloo, Dubuque	
Delaware	Elk Township	98.941	159.230	Iowa 3 – Edgewood, Colesburg	
1.000 mi = 1.609 km; 1.000 km = 0.621 mi: Concurrency terminus
