= Mill Creek Bridge (Clarence, Iowa) =

- U.S. National Register of Historic Places
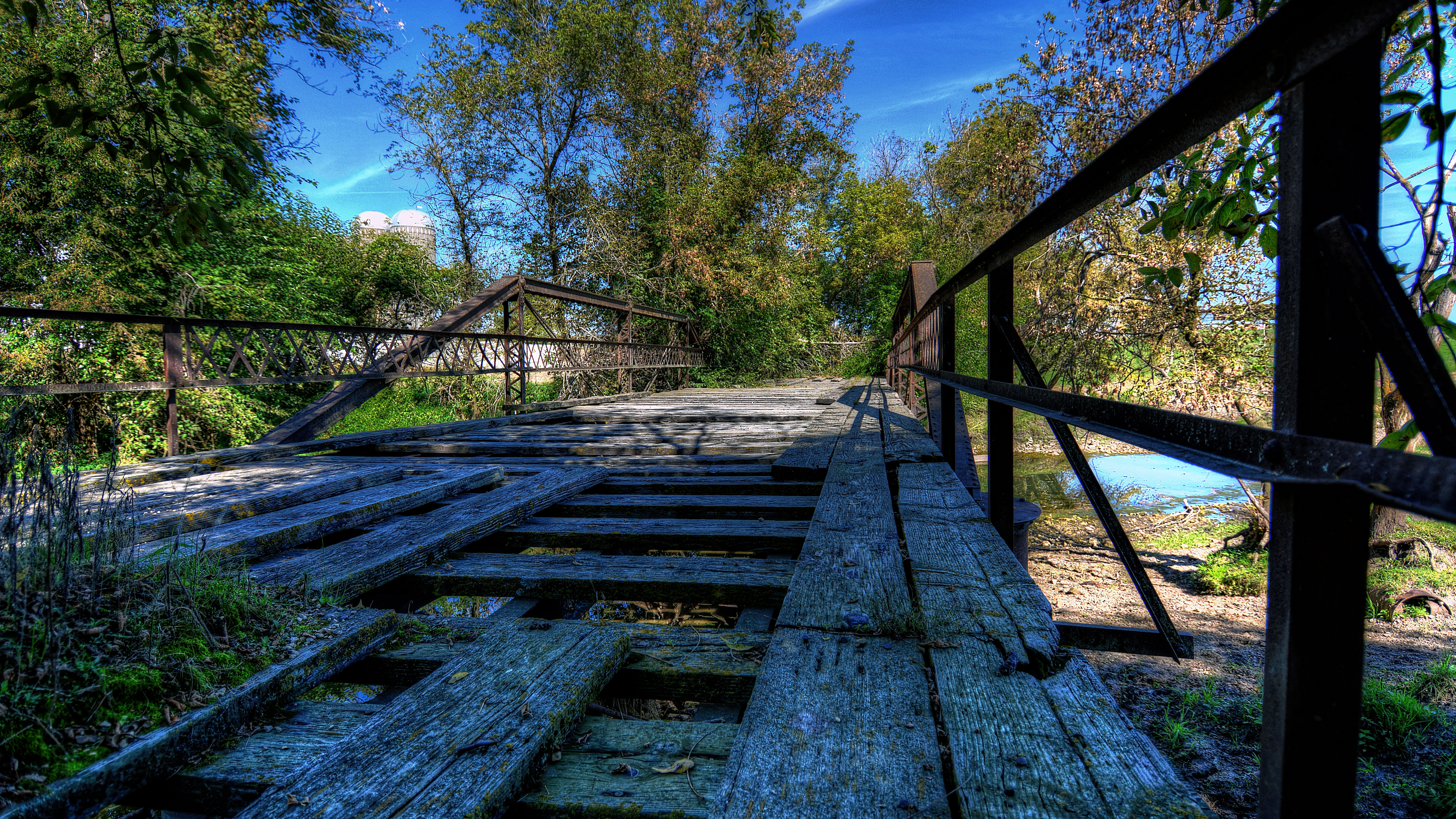

- Location within Iowa Location within the United States
- Location: Plum St. over Mill Creek
- Nearest city: Clarence, Iowa
- Coordinates: 41°54′15″N 91°03′53″W
- Area: less than one acre
- Built: 1889
- Built by: Ward and Keepers
- Architectural style: Pony truss
- NRHP reference No.: 98000743
- Added to NRHP: June 25, 1998

Mill Creek Bridge is a historic structure located in a rural area north of Clarence, Iowa, United States.The Cedar Bluff Bridge over the Cedar River was the first all-iron span built in Cedar County in 1877. Four more iron spans were built later that year, as were several others over the years before this bridge was completed in 1889. It is the only one of those bridges left, and one of the oldest pony truss bridges in the state of Iowa. Citizens in Dayton Township petitioned the Cedar County Board of Supervisors in June 1888 for the bridge over Mill Creek. The supervisors contracted with Ward and Keepers of Clinton, Iowa to design and build the bridge. The 58-foot (1,800 cm) span was built on concrete-filled iron cylinder piers, with timber stringer approach spans. Over the years sub-structural alterations have been made to the bridge. It has subsequently been abandoned and its deck is in a deteriorating condition. The bridge was listed on the National Register of Historic Places in 1998. It was relocated to Whitetails Saloon in 2020
