= Cedar County Courthouse =

Cedar County Courthouse may refer to:

- Cedar County Courthouse (Nebraska), Hartington, Nebraska
- Cedar County Courthouse (Iowa), Tipton, Iowa
