= Sunbury, Iowa =

- unincorporated community
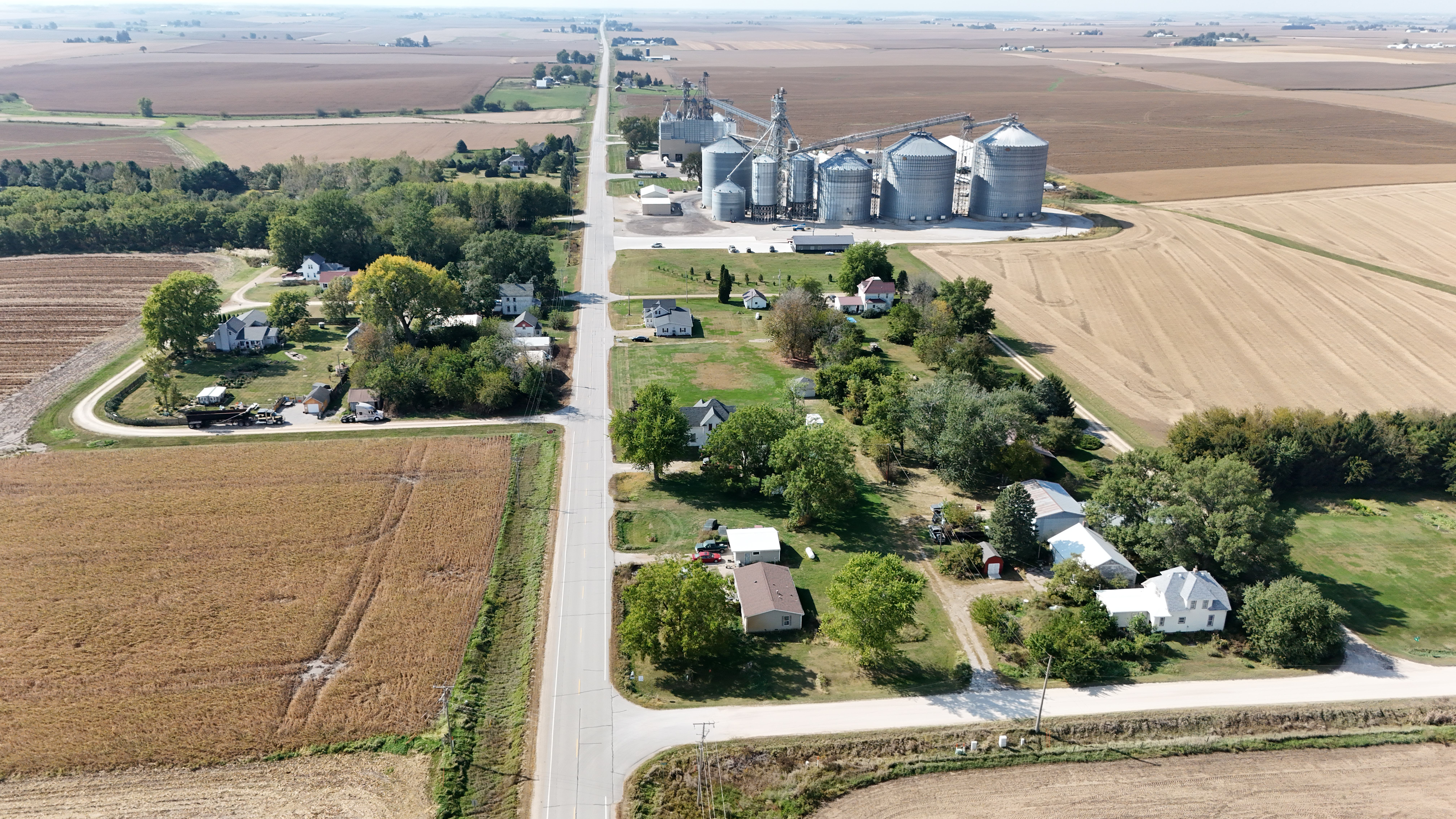
- Sunbury, looking west along 290th street
- Interactive map of Sunbury, Iowa
- Coordinates: 41°40′12″N 90°55′52″W
- Country: United States
- State: Iowa
- County: Cedar County
- Elevation: 774 ft (236 m)
- Time zone: UTC-6 (Central (CST))
  - Summer (DST): UTC-5 (CDT)
- Area code: 563
- GNIS feature ID: 462084

Sunbury is an unincorporated community in Cedar County, Iowa, United States.

== Geography ==
It is located just west of the intersection of County Roads F44 and Y26, in the southeastern part of the county, southeast of Bennett and north of Durant.

== History ==
Sunbury was founded when the railroad was introduced into the area. Sunbury's population was 13 in 1902, and 107 in 1925.

Sunbury was the location of the Sunbury Dance Hall, which opened circa 1895 and closed in 1964. The hamlet also boasted a bank, which opened in 1901. The bank has been abandoned for decades and in 2014 it was razed.

The population was 60 in 1940.

== See also ==
- Plato, Iowa
