= Pioneer Township, Cedar County, Iowa =

Township in Iowa, US

Pioneer Township, Cedar County
- Township
- Coordinates: 41°54′09″N 091°19′01″W
- Country: United States
- State: Iowa
- County: Cedar

Area
  - Total: 36.5 sq mi (94.6 km^{2})
  - Land: 36.51 sq mi (94.56 km^{2})
  - Water: 0.015 sq mi (0.04 km^{2})
- Elevation: 869 ft (265 m)

Population (2000)
  - Total: 1,810
  - Density: 49/sq mi (19.1/km^{2})
- FIPS code: 19-93333
- GNIS feature ID: 0468519

Pioneer Township is one of seventeen townships in Cedar County, Iowa, United States. At the 2000 census, its population was 1,810.

== History ==
Pioneer Township was established in 1848.

== Geography ==
Pioneer Township covers an area of 36.53 square miles (94.6 km^{2}) and contains one incorporated settlement, Mechanicsville. According to the USGS, it contains four cemeteries: Andre, Pioneer, Rose Hill and Union.
