= Cedar Bluff =

Cedar Bluff is the name of cities in the United States:

- Cedar Bluff, Alabama
- Cedar Bluff, Iowa
- Cedar Bluff, Mississippi
- Cedar Bluff, Virginia

Also:

- Cedar Bluff Reservoir, Trego County, Kansas
- Cedar Bluff State Park, Trego County, Kansas
- Cedar Bluff (Union, South Carolina), a NRHP-listed house
- Cedar Bluff, a neighborhood in Knoxville, Tennessee
