= Springfield Township, Cedar County, Iowa =

Township in Iowa, US

Springfield Township, Cedar County
- Township
- Coordinates: 41°49′16″N 090°57′56″W
- Country: United States
- State: Iowa
- County: Cedar

Area
  - Total: 37.66 sq mi (97.54 km^{2})
  - Land: 37.66 sq mi (97.54 km^{2})
  - Water: 0 sq mi (0 km^{2})
- Elevation: 768 ft (234 m)

Population (2000)
  - Total: 1,138
  - Density: 30/sq mi (11.7/km^{2})
- FIPS code: 19-93978
- GNIS feature ID: 0468740

Springfield Township is one of seventeen townships in Cedar County, Iowa, United States. As of the 2000 census, its population was 1,138.

== History ==
Springfield Township was organized in 1841. The first school building in Springfield Township was built in 1848.

== Geography ==
Springfield Township covers an area of 37.66 square miles (97.5 km^{2}) and contains one incorporated settlement, Lowden. According to the USGS, it contains five cemeteries: Elliott Parr Grave, Fairview, Lowden, Van Horn and Zion Church.
