= Massillon, Iowa =

- unincorporated community
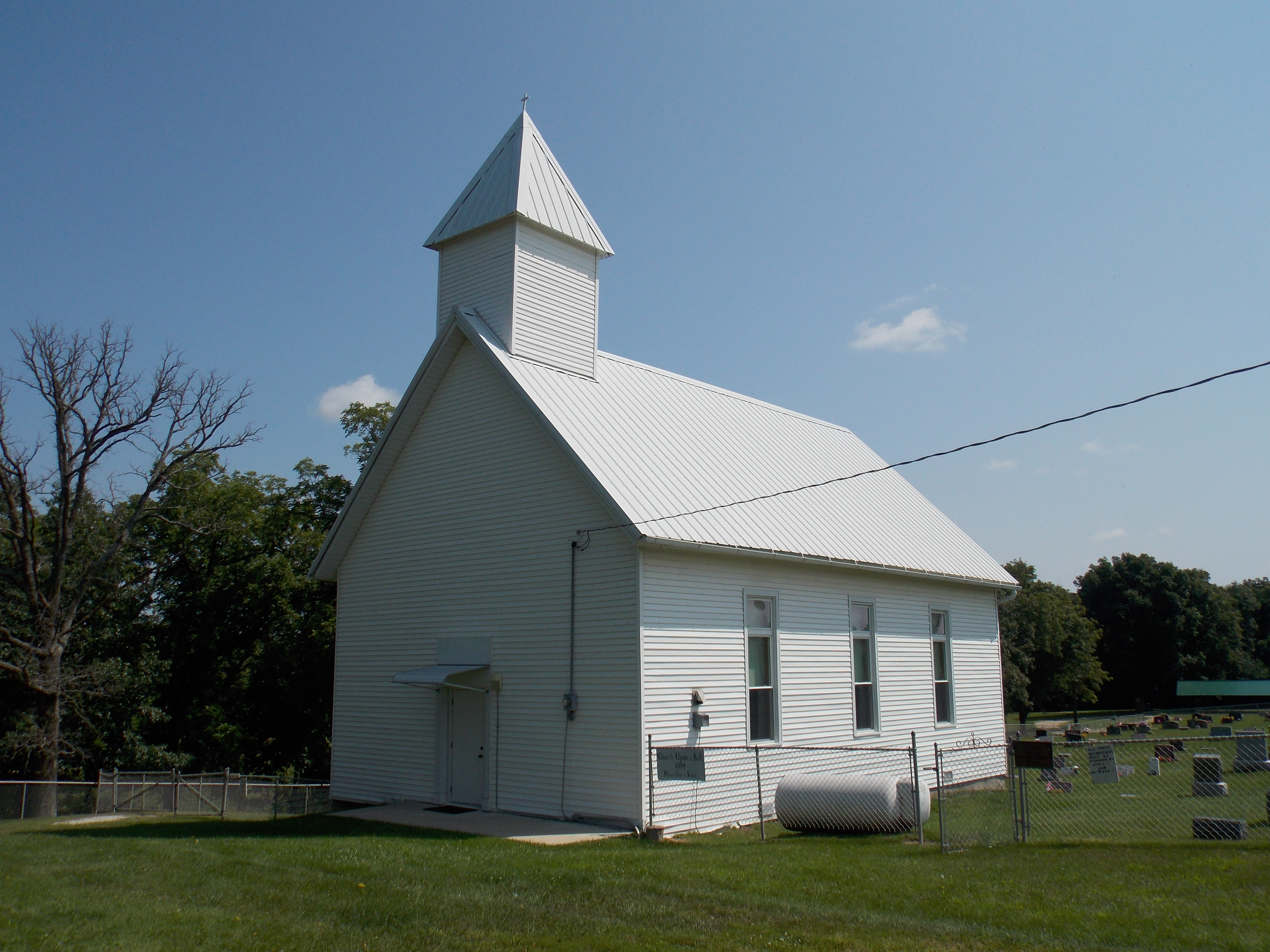
- Church Upon a Hill in Massillon off of County Highway E63

- Location within the state of Iowa Massillon, Iowa (the United States)
- Coordinates: 41°54′53″N 90°55′22″W
- Country: United States
- State: Iowa
- County: Cedar County
- Elevation: 728 ft (222 m)
- Time zone: UTC-6 (Central (CST))
  - Summer (DST): UTC-5 (CDT)
- Area code: 563
- GNIS feature ID: 458853

Massillon is an unincorporated community in Massillon Township, Cedar County, Iowa, United States. It is south of the Wapsipinicon River on County Road Y24, west of Toronto and north of Lowden in the northeastern corner of the county.

== History ==
The area where the town of Massillon was founded was originally known as Denson's Ferry, named after a Joseph Denson who ran a ferry on the Wapsipinicon River. The town plat was founded in 1854 and was a station along the Davenport & Northern Railroad. The town was named after the city of Massillon, Ohio, located 540 miles (870 km) to the east on US 30.

The first bridge was built over the Wapsipinicon River at Massillon in 1868 at the expense of $4,000.

The population was 47 in 1940.
