= Fremont Township, Cedar County, Iowa =

Township in Iowa, US

Fremont Township, Cedar County
- Township
- Coordinates: 41°54′11″N 091°12′03″W
- Country: United States
- State: Iowa
- County: Cedar

Area
  - Total: 36.25 sq mi (93.88 km^{2})
  - Land: 36.25 sq mi (93.88 km^{2})
  - Water: 0 sq mi (0 km^{2})
- Elevation: 850 ft (259 m)

Population (2000)
  - Total: 991
  - Density: 27/sq mi (10.6/km^{2})
- FIPS code: 19-91467
- GNIS feature ID: 0467876

Fremont Township is one of seventeen townships in Cedar County, Iowa, United States. As of the 2000 census, its population was 991.

== History ==
The first school building in Fremont Township was built in 1858.

== Geography ==
Fremont Township covers an area of 36.25 square miles (93.9 km^{2}) and contains one incorporated settlement, Stanwood. According to the USGS, it contains one cemetery, Stanwood.
