= Center Township, Cedar County, Iowa =

Township in Iowa, US

Center Township, Cedar County
- Township
- Coordinates: 41°45′06″N 091°07′26″W
- Country: United States
- State: Iowa
- County: Cedar

Area
  - Total: 66.28 sq mi (171.67 km^{2})
  - Land: 66.22 sq mi (171.51 km^{2})
  - Water: 0.066 sq mi (0.17 km^{2})
- Elevation: 791 ft (241 m)

Population (2000)
  - Total: 3,945
  - Density: 60/sq mi (23/km^{2})
- FIPS code: 19-90588
- GNIS feature ID: 0467571

Center Township is one of seventeen townships in Cedar County, Iowa, United States. As of the 2000 census, its population was 3,945.

== History ==
Center Township was established in 1841.

== Geography ==
Center Township covers an area of 66.28 square miles (171.7 km^{2}) and contains one incorporated settlement, Tipton. According to the USGS, it contains eighteen cemeteries: Bolton, Bradley, Center Ross, County Home, Eureka, Fairland, Goodale, Kiser, Masonic, Mount Zion, Ochiltree, Saint Marys, Sand Hill, Virginia Grove, Wood Bridge, Wood Bridge, Wright and York Prairie.
