= Centerdale, Iowa =

- Unincorporated community
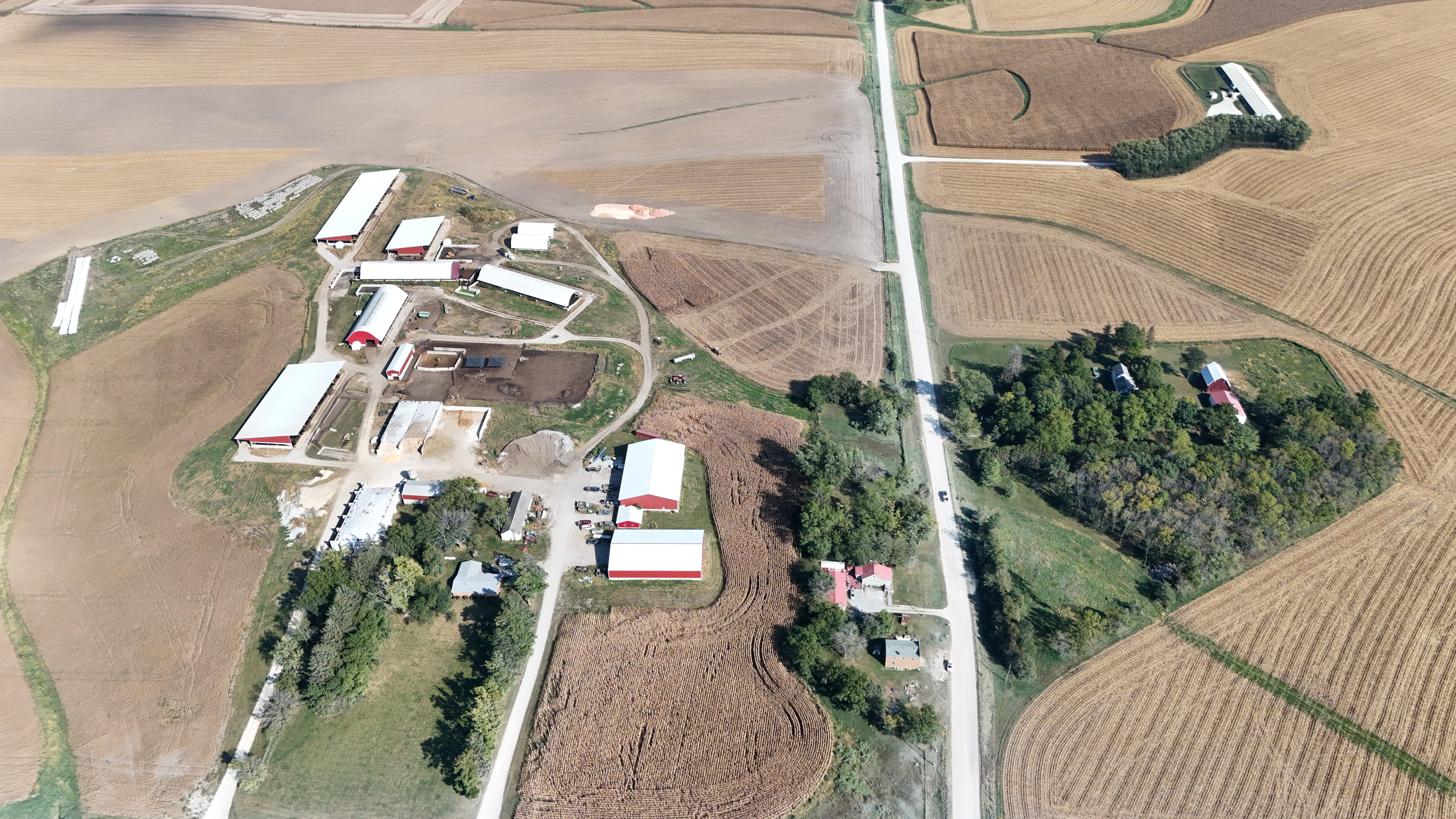
- Centerdale, looking east along 310th street

- Location within Iowa
- Coordinates: 41°38′31″N 91°18′26″W
- Country: United States
- State: Iowa
- County: Cedar
- Elevation: 722 ft (220 m)
- Time zone: UTC-6 (Central (CST))
  - Summer (DST): UTC-5 (CDT)
- Area code: 563
- GNIS feature ID: 464494

Centerdale is an unincorporated community in Cedar County, Iowa, United States.

== History ==
Centerdale (historically spelled Centredale) was settled in the early 1850s.

Centerdale was platted at the time the Burlington, Cedar Rapids and Northern Railway arrived. Centerdale's population was 16 in 1902, and 15 in 1925. The population was 10 in 1940.
