= North Cedar Community School District =

Public school district in Stanwood, Iowa, United States

Coordinates: 41.894890°N 91.151147°W

Location
- Stanwood, Iowa Cedar County and Jones County United States
- Coordinates: 41.894890, -91.151147

District information
- Type: Public
- Grades: PreK-12
- Established: 1995
- Superintendent: Mark Dohmen
- Schools: 3
- Budget: $13,514,000 (2020-21)
- NCES District ID: 1917100

Students and staff
- Students: 631 (2022-23)
- Teachers: 52.89 FTE
- Staff: 82.59 FTE
- Student–teacher ratio: 11.93
- Athletic conference: Tri Rivers Conference
- District mascot: Knights
- Colors: Purple, Teal and Silver

Other information
- Website: north-cedar.org/Home

The North Cedar Community School District is a rural public school district headquartered in Stanwood, Iowa. The district is in portions of northern Cedar County and a small section of Jones County, and serves the communities of Stanwood, Mechanicsville, Clarence and Lowden, and surrounding unincorporated areas.

North Cedar consists of three schools: elementary schools (preK-6) in Lowden and Mechanicsville, and a Junior/Senior High School (7-12) in Clarence. The district offices are located in Stanwood. The school district is accredited by the North Central Association of Colleges and Schools and the Iowa Department of Education.

== History ==
It was established on July 1, 1995, by the merger of the Clarence-Lowden Community School District and the Lincoln Community School District.

== Schools ==
- North Cedar Lowden Elementary Center, Lowden
- North Cedar Mechanicsville Elementary Center, Mechanicsville
- North Cedar Jr.-Sr. High School, Clarence

=== North Cedar High School ===
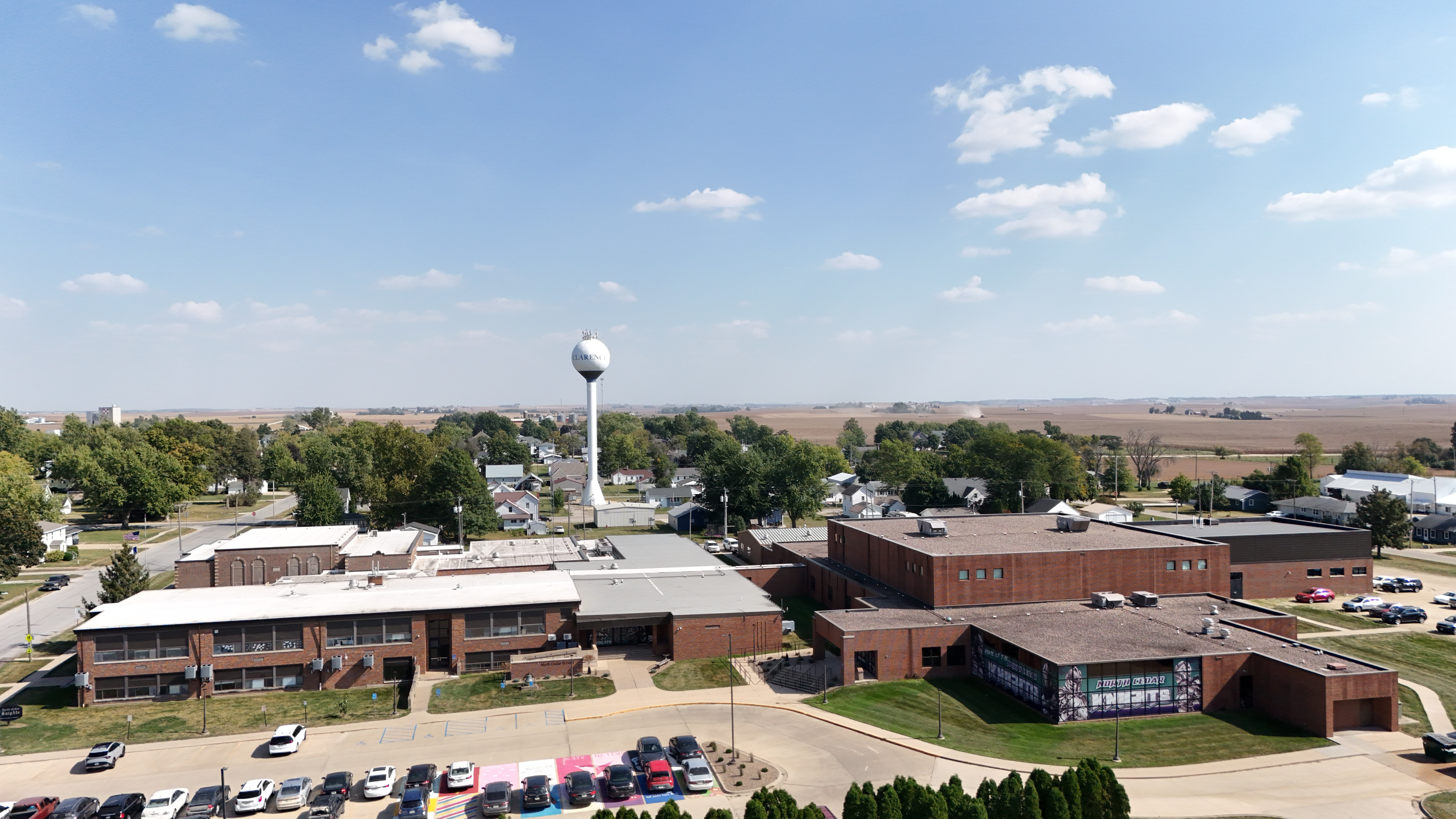
North Cedar Jr./Sr. high school in Clarence

==== Athletics ====
North Cedar High School sports teams are known as the Knights; their uniforms display the school's colors of purple and teal.

The school fields athletic teams in 13 sports, including:

- Summer: Baseball and softball.
- Fall: Football, volleyball, boys' and girls' cross country, and football cheerleading.
- Winter: Boys' basketball, wrestling, and wrestling cheer.
  - Girls' Basketball - 2000 State Champions
- Spring: Boys' and girls' track and field; and boys' and girls' golf.

Outdoor sports, such as football and track and field, are played in Stanwood. Baseball and Softball are played in Lowden. The indoor sports of volleyball, basketball and wrestling, take place at the Jr/Sr High School in Clarence.

North Cedar High School is classified as a 2A school (Iowa's second-smallest tier schools), according to the Iowa High School Athletic Association and Iowa Girls High School Athletic Union; in sports where there are fewer divisions, the Knights are in either the smallest or middle classes, depending on the sport (e.g., Class 2A for wrestling). The school is a member of the sixteen-team Tri-Rivers Conference, which comprises similar-sized schools from communities in eastern Iowa.

North Cedar enjoys its biggest rivalries with neighboring school, Tipton, and also with the West Branch Bears.

== Enrollment ==
View source data.

== See also ==
- List of school districts in Iowa
- List of high schools in Iowa
