= Linn Township, Cedar County, Iowa =

Township in Iowa, US

Linn Township, Cedar County
- Township
- Coordinates: 41°50′11″N 091°17′46″W
- Country: United States
- State: Iowa
- County: Cedar

Area
  - Total: 19.6 sq mi (50.7 km^{2})
  - Land: 19.55 sq mi (50.63 km^{2})
  - Water: 0.027 sq mi (0.07 km^{2})
- Elevation: 774 ft (236 m)

Population (2000)
  - Total: 201
  - Density: 10/sq mi (4/km^{2})
- FIPS code: 19-92643
- GNIS feature ID: 0468280

Linn Township is one of the seventeen townships in Cedar County, Iowa, United States. As of the 2000 census, its population was 201.

== History ==
Linn Township was organized in 1841.

== Geography ==
Linn Township covers an area of 19.58 square miles (50.7 km^{2}) and contains no incorporated settlements. According to the USGS, it contains two cemeteries: Achey and Mason.
