= Cedar County Courthouse (Iowa) =

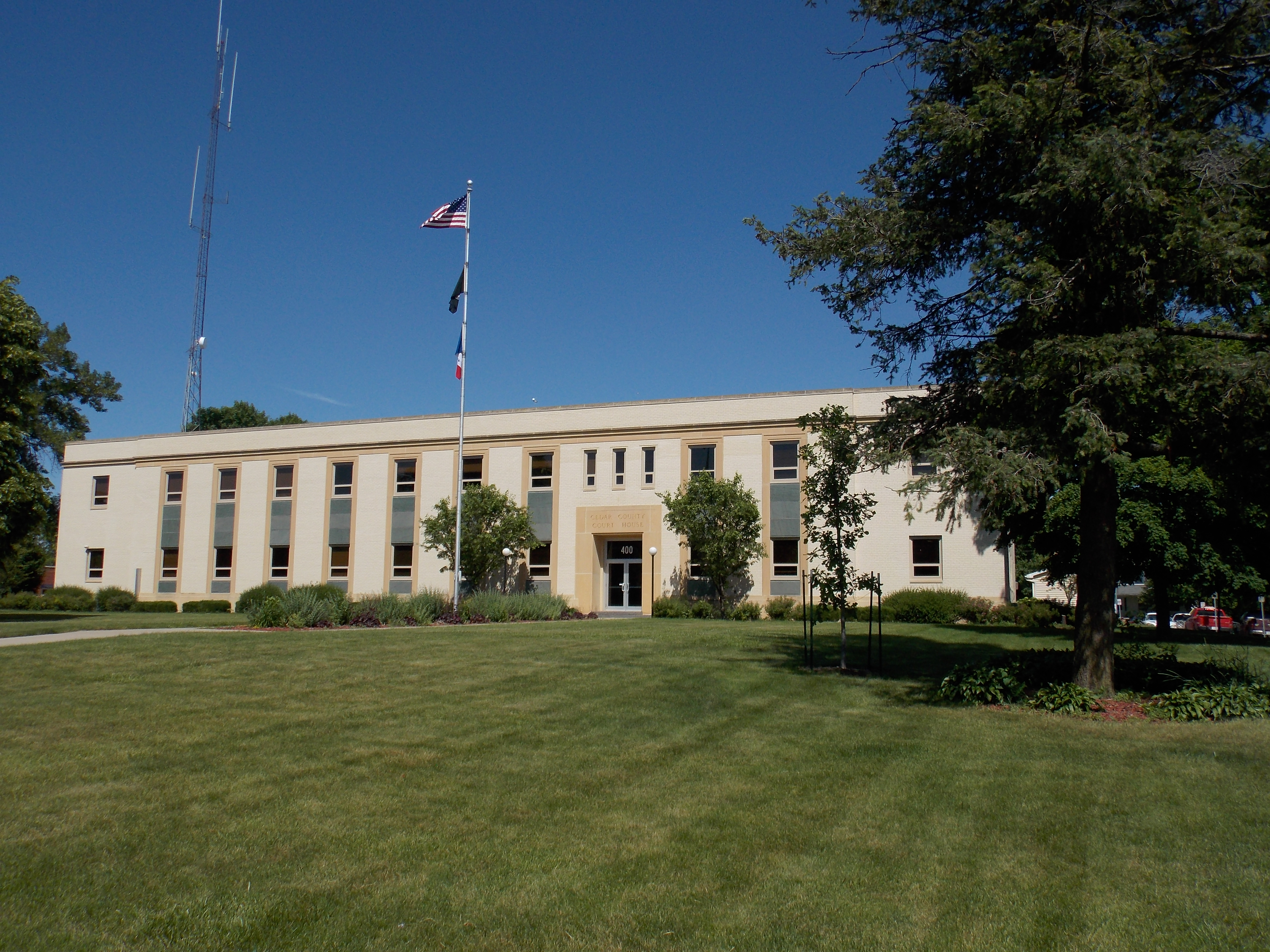
- Cedar County Courthouse
- Interactive map of the Cedar County Courthouse area

General information
- Type: Courthouse
- Architectural style: Modern
- Location: 400 Cedar St., Tipton, Iowa, United States
- Coordinates: 41.769478°N 91.127651°W
- Construction started: 1965
- Completed: 1968

Technical details
- Floor count: 2

The Cedar County Courthouse is located in Tipton, Iowa, United States. The present courthouse is the third structure the county has used for court functions and county administration.

== History ==
Rochester was Cedar County's first county seat. The log building built there as a courthouse and jail may never have been used for court purposes. It was used, however, for school exhibitions, dances, and maybe as a jail. The county seat was moved to Tipton in 1841, but the frame courthouse building was not completed until 1845. It had been built on a square that had been set aside for a courthouse when the town was surveyed. The delay in construction may be attributed to the unusual funding scheme whereby the jail was funded first by the sale of town lots, and when that was paid, they would pay for the courthouse. The unfinished building was occupied by the county. After it was finished it had so much extra space that the second floor was rented to the local Masonic lodge. It was replaced in 1859 with a brick courthouse that featured a tall cupola capped with a dome. It was extensively renovated and enlarged in 1889. The cupola was removed at that time, and a clock tower was added above the main entrance. The tower proved unsafe and it had to be removed in 1948. The present Modern-style brick courthouse was begun in 1965 and completed three years later for about $595,000.
