= Wald, Iowa =

- Unincorporated community
- Location within Iowa
- Coordinates: 41°50′16″N 91°07′57″W
- Country: United States
- State: Iowa
- County: Cedar
- Elevation: 846 ft (258 m)
- Time zone: UTC-6 (Central (CST))
  - Summer (DST): UTC-5 (CDT)
- Area code: 563
- GNIS feature ID: 464788

Wald is an unincorporated community in Cedar County, in the U.S. state of Iowa.

== History ==
Wald was originally called Walden. The community was named for W. D. Walden, a railroad employee. A post office was established at Wald in 1896 and closed in 1898.
