= Fairfield Township, Cedar County, Iowa =

Township in Iowa, US

Fairfield Township, Cedar County
- Township
- Coordinates: 41°49′14″N 091°04′10″W
- Country: United States
- State: Iowa
- County: Cedar

Area
  - Total: 30.74 sq mi (79.61 km^{2})
  - Land: 30.74 sq mi (79.61 km^{2})
  - Water: 0 sq mi (0 km^{2})
- Elevation: 810 ft (247 m)

Population (2000)
  - Total: 268
  - Density: 8.8/sq mi (3.4/km^{2})
- FIPS code: 19-91275
- GNIS feature ID: 0467809

Fairfield Township is one of seventeen townships in Cedar County, Iowa, United States. As of the 2000 census, its population was 268.

== Geography ==
Fairfield Township covers an area of 30.74 square miles (79.6 km^{2}) and contains no incorporated settlements.
