= Iowa Township, Cedar County, Iowa =

Township in Iowa, US

Iowa Township, Cedar County
- Township
- Coordinates: 41°38′56″N 091°12′05″W
- Country: United States
- State: Iowa
- County: Cedar

Area
  - Total: 37.65 sq mi (97.51 km^{2})
  - Land: 37.05 sq mi (95.96 km^{2})
  - Water: 0.59 sq mi (1.54 km^{2})
- Elevation: 748 ft (228 m)

Population (2000)
  - Total: 460
  - Density: 12/sq mi (4.8/km^{2})
- FIPS code: 19-92055
- GNIS feature ID: 0468078

Iowa Township is one of seventeen townships in Cedar County, Iowa, United States. As of the 2000 census, its population was 460.

== History ==
Iowa Township was organized in 1840 The first school in Iowa Township was established about 1845. (or 1841).

== Geography ==
Iowa Township covers an area of 37.65 square miles (97.5 km^{2}) and contains no incorporated settlements. According to the USGS, it contains six cemeteries: Bethel, Burnett, Dunfee, Gray's Ford, North Liberty and Pee Dee.
