= Red Oak Township, Cedar County, Iowa =

Township in Iowa, US

Red Oak Township, Cedar County
- Township
- Coordinates: 41°49′31″N 091°10′53″W
- Country: United States
- State: Iowa
- County: Cedar

Area
  - Total: 23.66 sq mi (61.28 km^{2})
  - Land: 23.66 sq mi (61.28 km^{2})
  - Water: 0 sq mi (0 km^{2})
- Elevation: 820 ft (250 m)

Population (2000)
  - Total: 194
  - Density: 8.3/sq mi (3.2/km^{2})
- FIPS code: 19-93552
- GNIS feature ID: 0468592

Red Oak Township is one of seventeen townships in Cedar County, Iowa, United States. As of the 2000 census, its population was 194.

== History ==
The first cabin in Red Oak Township was built in 1836 by the Oaks family.

== Geography ==
Red Oak Township covers an area of 23.66 square miles (61.3 km^{2}) and contains no incorporated settlements. According to the USGS, it contains one cemetery, Red Oak.
