= Cedar County, Iowa =

County in Iowa, United States

- County
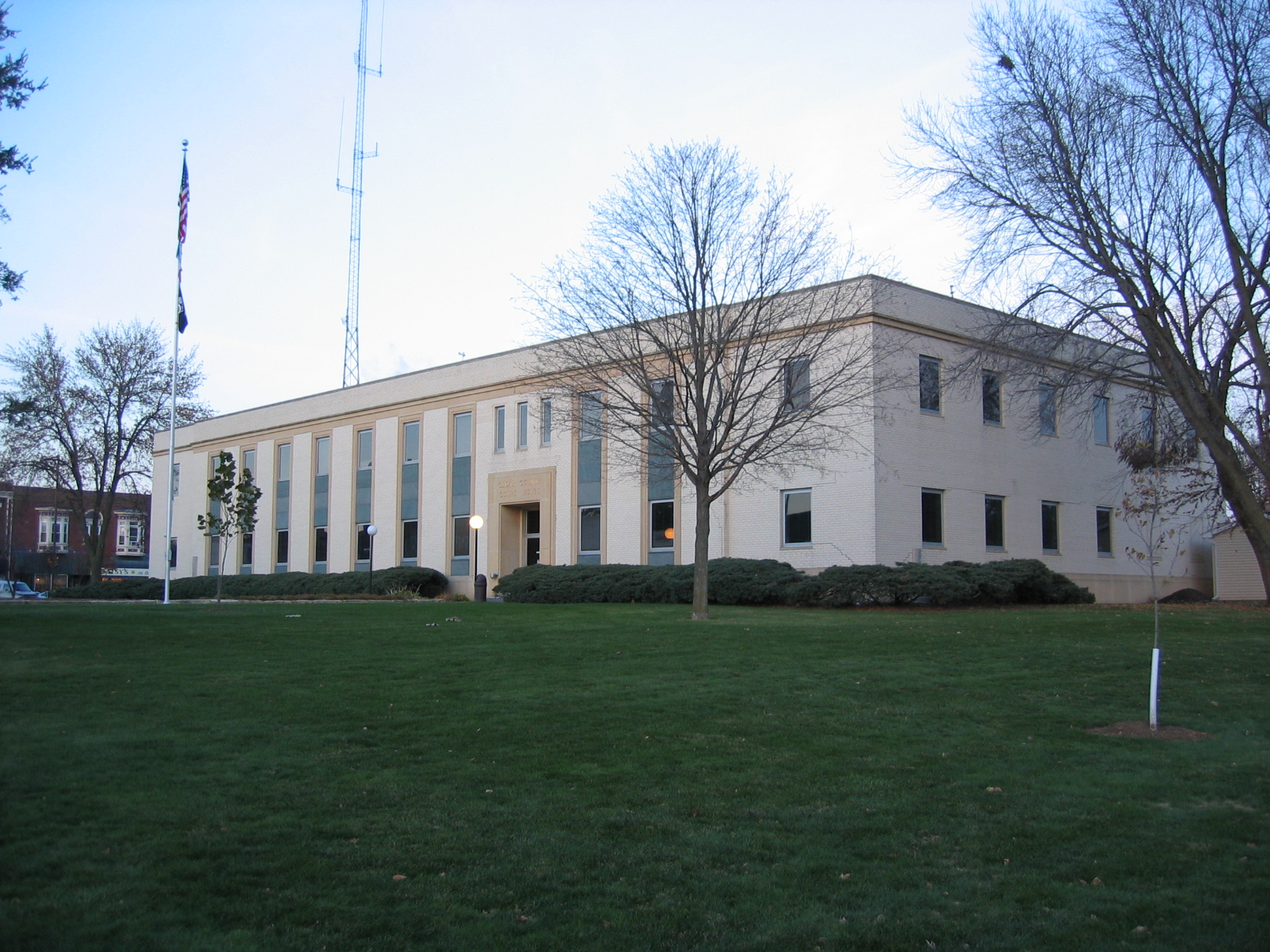
- Cedar County Courthouse

- Location within the U.S. state of Iowa
- Coordinates: 41°46′05″N 91°07′43″W
- Country: United States
- State: Iowa
- Founded: 1837
- Named for: Cedar River
- Seat: Tipton
- Largest city: Tipton

Area
  - Total: 582 sq mi (1,510 km^{2})
  - Land: 579 sq mi (1,500 km^{2})
  - Water: 2.5 sq mi (6.5 km^{2}) 0.4%

Population (2020)
  - Total: 18,505
  - Estimate (2025): 18,359 ▼
  - Density: 32.0/sq mi (12.3/km^{2})
- Time zone: UTC−6 (Central)
  - Summer (DST): UTC−5 (CDT)
- Congressional district: 1st
- Website: cedarcounty.iowa.gov
- Iowa county number 16

Cedar County is a county located in the U.S. state of Iowa. As of the 2020 census, the population was 18,505. Its county seat is Tipton. The county is named for the Cedar River, which runs through the county.

Cedar County is located between the Cedar Rapids, Quad Cities, and Iowa City metropolitan areas, also known as the "Tri-Metro" county. It is the only Iowa county that shares its name with a tree.

== History ==
Cedar County was formed on December 21, 1837, from sections of Dubuque County. It was named for the Cedar River.

In 1840, the City of Tipton, the current county seat, was established.

Before the Civil War, the area around West Branch was an active focal point of the Underground Railroad, a network for the freeing of slaves from the southern states.

The former US President Herbert Hoover (1874-1964) was born in West Branch in Cedar County.

In 1931, Cedar County was the battleground for the Iowa Cow War, where multiple violent disputes over the testing of cattle for bovine tuberculosis occurred.

The Cedar County Sheriff's House and Jail is believed to be the last jail and residence combination still in use when it closed in 2001. It was listed on the National Register of Historic Places in 2003.

== Geography ==
According to the U.S. Census Bureau, the county has a total area of 582 square miles (1,510 km^{2}), of which 579 square miles (1,500 km^{2}) is land and 2.5 square miles (6.5 km^{2}) (0.4%) is water. Rock Creek flows through Cedar County.

=== Major highways ===
- Interstate 80
- U.S. Highway 6
- U.S. Highway 30
- Iowa Highway 38
- Iowa Highway 130

=== Adjacent counties ===
- Jones County (north)
- Clinton County (northeast)
- Scott County (southeast)
- Muscatine County (south)
- Johnson County (west)
- Linn County (northwest)

=== National protected area ===
- Herbert Hoover National Historic Site

== Demographics ==
Historical population
Census	Pop.	Note	%±
1850	3,941		—
1860	12,949		228.6%
1870	19,731		52.4%
1880	18,936		−4.0%
1890	18,253		−3.6%
1900	19,371		6.1%
1910	17,765		−8.3%
1920	17,560		−1.2%
1930	16,760		−4.6%
1940	16,884		0.7%
1950	16,910		0.2%
1960	17,791		5.2%
1970	17,655		−0.8%
1980	18,635		5.6%
1990	17,444		−6.4%
2000	18,187		4.3%
2010	18,499		1.7%
2020	18,505		0.0%
2025 (est.)	18,359	▼	−0.8%
U.S. Decennial Census; 1790-1960 1900-1990; 1990-2000 2010-2018

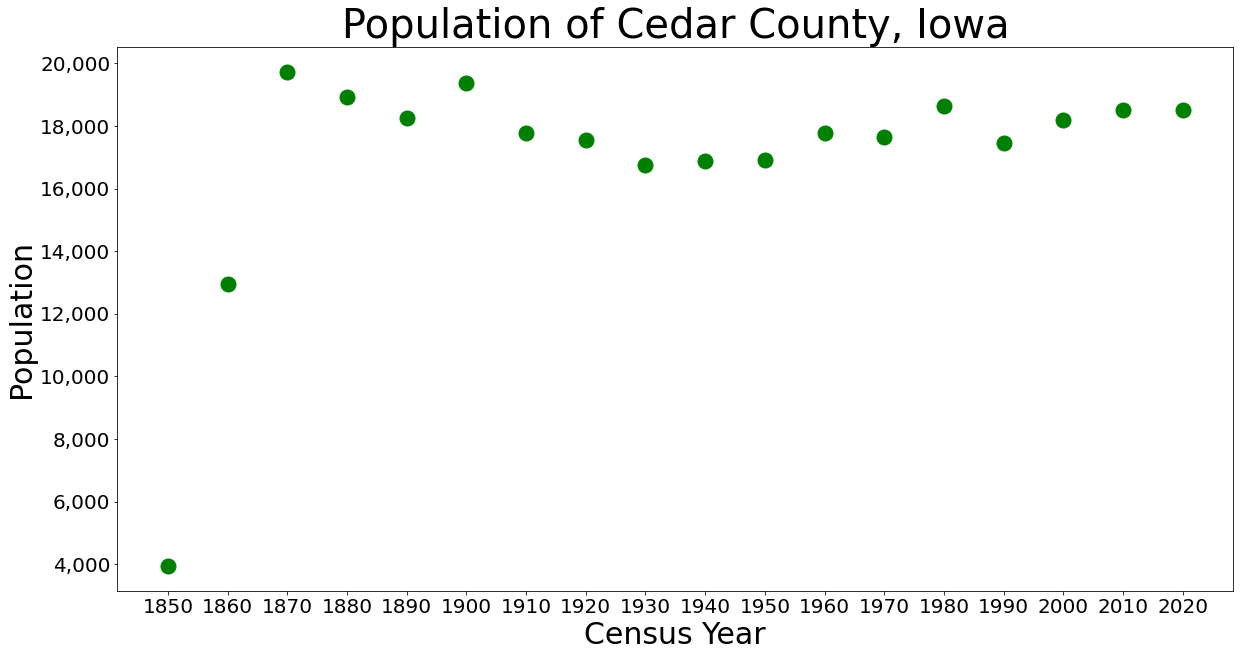
Population of Cedar County from US census data

=== 2020 census ===
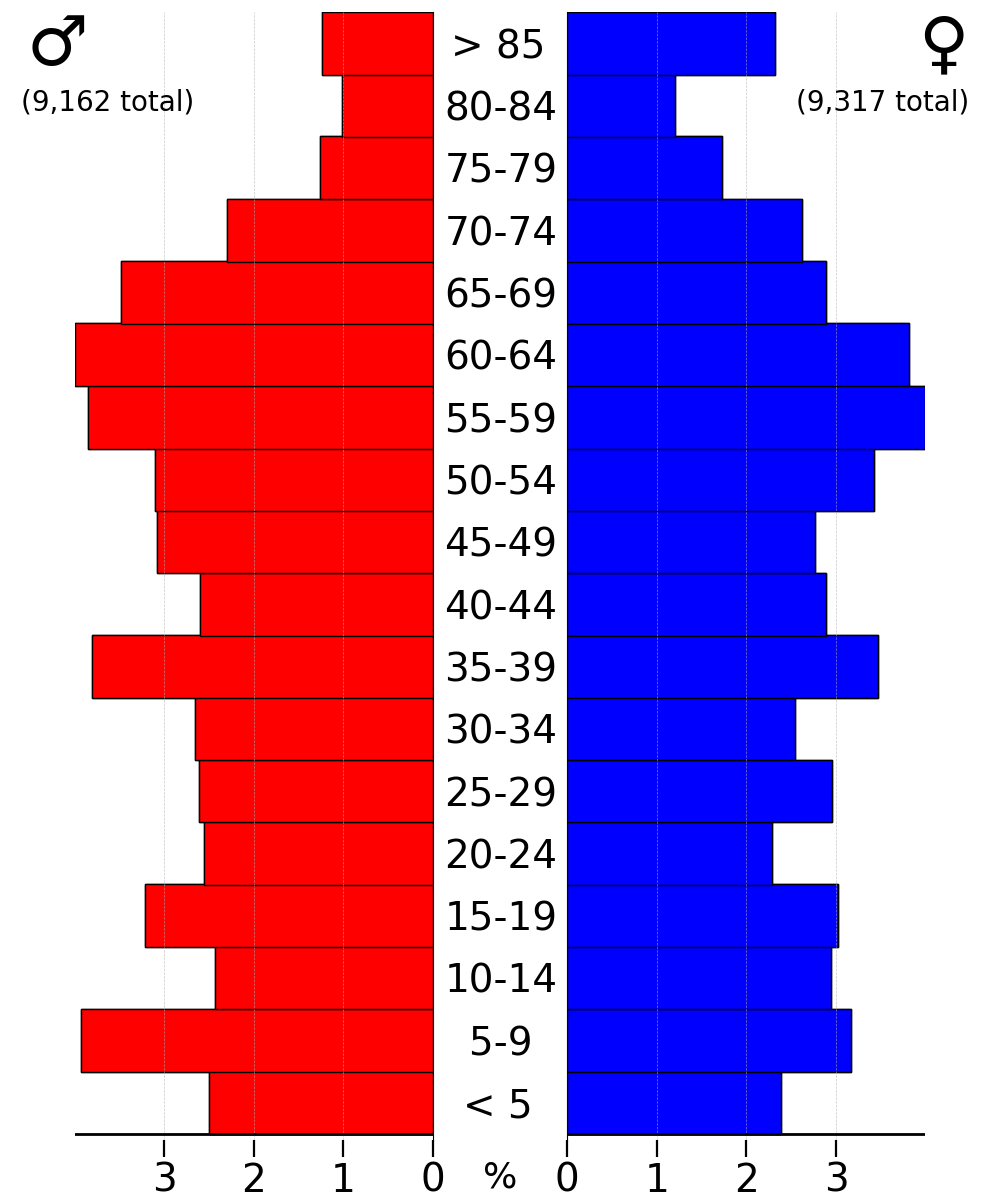
2022 US Census population pyramid for Cedar County from ACS 5-year estimates

As of the 2020 census, the county had a population of 18,505 and a population density of 31.7/sq mi (12.3/km^{2}). The median age was 43.6 years, 22.8% of residents were under the age of 18, and 20.5% of residents were 65 years of age or older. For every 100 females there were 98.7 males, and for every 100 females age 18 and over there were 97.0 males age 18 and over.

96.29% of the population reported being of one race. The racial makeup of the county was 94.4% White, 0.4% Black or African American, 0.3% American Indian and Alaska Native, 0.3% Asian, <0.1% Native Hawaiian and Pacific Islander, 0.8% from some other race, and 3.7% from two or more races. Hispanic or Latino residents of any race comprised 2.5% of the population.

There were 7,594 households in the county, of which 28.3% had children under the age of 18 living in them. Of all households, 54.4% were married-couple households, 17.3% were households with a male householder and no spouse or partner present, and 20.8% were households with a female householder and no spouse or partner present. About 27.2% of all households were made up of individuals and 13.4% had someone living alone who was 65 years of age or older. There were 8,190 housing units, of which 7.3% were vacant. Among occupied housing units, 80.2% were owner-occupied and 19.8% were renter-occupied. The homeowner vacancy rate was 1.8% and the rental vacancy rate was 8.5%.

Less than 0.1% of residents lived in urban areas, while 100.0% lived in rural areas.

=== 2010 census ===
The 2010 census recorded a population of 13,956 in the county, with a population density of 31.9/sq mi (12.3/km^{2}). There were 8,064 housing units, of which 7,511 were occupied.

=== 2000 census ===
As of the census of 2000, there were 18,187 people, 7,147 households, and 5,138 families residing in the county. The population density was 31 people per square mile (12 people/km^{2}). There were 7,570 housing units at an average density of 13 units per square mile (5.0 units/km^{2}). The racial makeup of the county was 98.47% White, 0.19% Black or African American, 0.19% Native American, 0.30% Asian, 0.03% Pacific Islander, 0.26% from other races, and 0.57% from two or more races. 0.94% of the population were Hispanic or Latino of any race.

There were 7,147 households, out of which 33.30% had children under the age of 18 living with them, 61.60% were married couples living together, 6.70% had a female householder with no husband present, and 28.10% were non-families. 23.70% of all households were made up of individuals, and 11.90% had someone living alone who was 65 years of age or older. The average household size was 2.51 and the average family size was 2.96.

In the county, the population was spread out, with 25.30% under the age of 18, 6.90% from 18 to 24, 27.70% from 25 to 44, 23.80% from 45 to 64, and 16.20% who were 65 years of age or older. The median age was 39 years. For every 100 females there were 97.50 males. For every 100 females age 18 and over, there were 94.60 males.

The median income for a household in the county was $42,198, and the median income for a family was $48,850. Males had a median income of $32,008 versus $23,260 for females. The per capita income for the county was $19,200. About 4.00% of families and 5.50% of the population were below the poverty line, including 5.00% of those under age 18 and 7.70% of those age 65 or over.

== Communities ==
=== Cities ===
- Bennett
- Clarence
- Durant
- Lowden
- Mechanicsville
- Stanwood
- Tipton
- West Branch
- Wilton

=== Census-designated places ===
- Downey
- Rochester

=== Unincorporated communities ===
- Ayresville
- Buchanan
- Cedar Bluff
- Cedar Valley
- Centerdale
- Lime City
- Plato
- Massillon
- Springdale
- Sunbury
- Wald

=== Townships ===
Cedar County is divided into seventeen townships:

- Cass
- Center
- Dayton
- Fairfield
- Farmington
- Fremont
- Gower
- Inland
- Iowa
- Linn
- Massillon
- Pioneer
- Red Oak
- Rochester
- Springdale
- Springfield
- Sugar Creek

=== Population ranking ===
The population ranking of the following table is based on the 2020 census of Cedar County. † county seat

Rank	City/Town/etc.	Municipal type	Population (2020 Census)	Population (2024 Estimate)
1	† Tipton	City	3,149	3,155
2	West Branch (partially in Johnson County)	City	2,509	2,976
3	Wilton (mostly in Muscatine County)	City	2,924	2,917
4	Durant (partially in Muscatine and Scott Counties)	City	1,871	1,888
5	Clarence	City	1,039	1,066
6	Mechanicsville	City	1,020	1,034
7	Lowden	City	807	810
8	Stanwood	City	637	645
9	Bennett	City	347	339
10	Rochester	CDP	142	162

== Notable people ==
- Herbert Hoover (1874–1964), the 31st President of the United States (1929–1933) and the first president born west of the Mississippi River (born in West Branch in 1874).
- John Brown (1800–1859), abolitionist, maintained his headquarters at William Maxson's house near the small community of Springdale in Cedar County while planning his Harpers Ferry raid; Edwin and Barclay Coppock of Springdale participated in the raid.
- Lawrie Tatum (1822–1900), an Indian Agent to the Kiowa and Comanche tribes and, beginning in 1884, guardian to future President Herbert Hoover.

== Politics ==
Cedar County, like nearby Louisa County, is a reliable bellwether for the state of Iowa, having voted for the statewide winner in every presidential election since 1952.

United States presidential election results for Cedar County, Iowa
Year	Republican		Democratic		Third party(ies)	
Year	No.	%	No.	%	No.	%
1896	2,717	54.50%	2,128	42.69%	140	2.81%
1900	2,740	55.19%	2,131	42.92%	94	1.89%
1904	2,691	56.94%	1,926	40.75%	109	2.31%
1908	2,455	54.17%	1,986	43.82%	91	2.01%
1912	1,036	23.44%	1,938	43.85%	1,446	32.71%
1916	2,862	63.56%	1,595	35.42%	46	1.02%
1920	5,697	77.88%	1,420	19.41%	198	2.71%
1924	4,625	60.74%	1,478	19.41%	1,512	19.86%
1928	4,856	65.49%	2,517	33.94%	42	0.57%
1932	3,277	40.62%	4,718	58.48%	73	0.90%
1936	3,686	44.76%	4,385	53.25%	164	1.99%
1940	5,521	62.45%	3,293	37.25%	26	0.29%
1944	4,673	63.95%	2,610	35.72%	24	0.33%
1948	3,957	56.40%	2,958	42.16%	101	1.44%
1952	6,176	71.48%	2,447	28.32%	17	0.20%
1956	5,344	64.71%	2,912	35.26%	2	0.02%
1960	5,217	61.92%	3,203	38.02%	5	0.06%
1964	3,106	40.16%	4,617	59.69%	12	0.16%
1968	4,494	59.02%	2,675	35.13%	445	5.84%
1972	4,452	63.39%	2,465	35.10%	106	1.51%
1976	4,308	55.08%	3,354	42.88%	160	2.05%
1980	4,398	56.41%	2,589	33.21%	810	10.39%
1984	4,617	59.59%	3,086	39.83%	45	0.58%
1988	3,373	45.10%	4,032	53.91%	74	0.99%
1992	2,965	35.98%	3,296	40.00%	1,979	24.02%
1996	2,966	38.64%	3,856	50.23%	854	11.13%
2000	4,031	48.31%	4,033	48.33%	280	3.36%
2004	4,869	50.23%	4,747	48.97%	78	0.80%
2008	4,289	44.38%	5,221	54.02%	155	1.60%
2012	4,529	46.94%	4,972	51.53%	148	1.53%
2016	5,295	55.50%	3,599	37.72%	647	6.78%
2020	6,161	57.56%	4,337	40.52%	205	1.92%
2024	6,390	60.03%	4,075	38.28%	179	1.68%

== Education ==
School districts include:

- Bennett Community School District
- Durant Community School District
- Lisbon Community School District
- Midland Community School District
- North Cedar Community School District
- Tipton Community School District
- West Branch Community School District
- West Liberty Community School District
- Wilton Community School District

== See also ==
- National Register of Historic Places listings in Cedar County, Iowa
