= Massillon Township, Cedar County, Iowa =

Township in Iowa, US

Massillon Township, Cedar County
- Township
- Coordinates: 41°54′05″N 090°58′01″W
- Country: United States
- State: Iowa
- County: Cedar

Area
  - Total: 35.08 sq mi (90.85 km^{2})
  - Land: 35.08 sq mi (90.85 km^{2})
  - Water: 0 sq mi (0 km^{2})
- Elevation: 778 ft (237 m)

Population (2000)
  - Total: 330
  - Density: 9.3/sq mi (3.6/km^{2})
- FIPS code: 19-92895
- GNIS feature ID: 0468368

Massillon Township is one of seventeen townships in Cedar County, Iowa, United States. As of the 2000 census, its population was 330.

== Geography ==
Massillon Township covers an area of 35.08 square miles (90.9 km^{2}) and contains no incorporated settlements. According to the USGS, it contains three cemeteries: Brink, Center and Massillon. The township also contains the unincorporated settlement of Massillon, Iowa for which it is named.
