= Gower Township, Cedar County, Iowa =

Township in Iowa, US

Gower Township, Cedar County
- Township
- Coordinates: 41°43′44″N 091°18′25″W
- Country: United States
- State: Iowa
- County: Cedar

Area
  - Total: 34.73 sq mi (89.94 km^{2})
  - Land: 34.47 sq mi (89.27 km^{2})
  - Water: 0.25 sq mi (0.66 km^{2})
- Elevation: 748 ft (228 m)

Population (2000)
  - Total: 528
  - Density: 15/sq mi (5.9/km^{2})
- FIPS code: 19-91593
- GNIS feature ID: 0467918

Gower Township is one of seventeen townships in Cedar County, Iowa, United States. As of the 2000 census, its population was 528.

== History ==
Gower Township is named for Robert Gower, who arrived in 1841 and led the efforts to build a bridge there.

== Geography ==
Gower Township covers an area of 34.72 square miles (89.9 km^{2}) and contains no incorporated settlements. According to the USGS, it contains three cemeteries: Honey Grove, Howard and Saint Josephs.
