= Cedar Bluff, Iowa =

- Unincorporated community
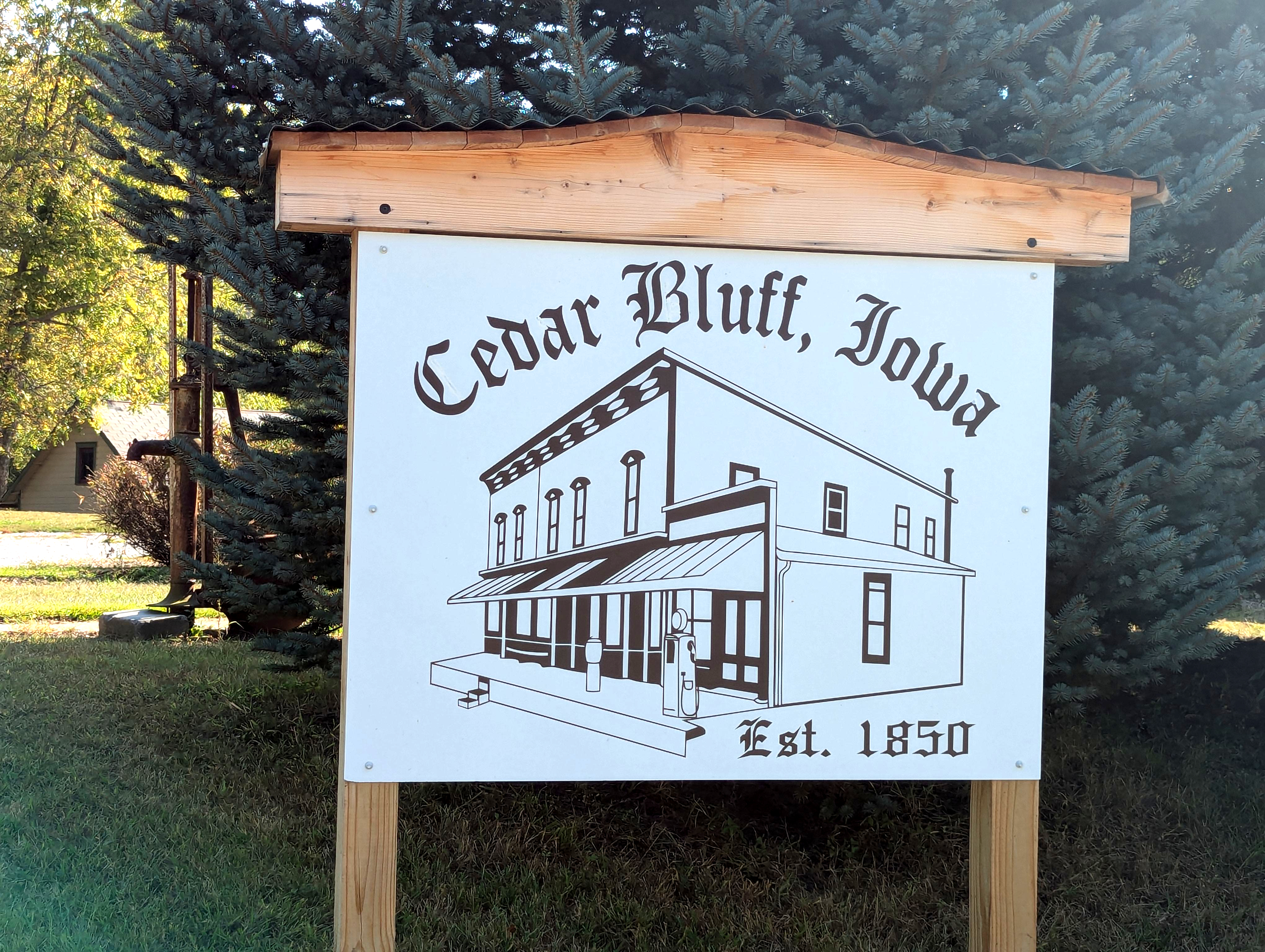
- Welcome Sign in Cedar Bluff

- Location within Iowa
- Coordinates: 41°47′09″N 91°18′30″W
- Country: United States
- State: Iowa
- County: Cedar
- Elevation: 709 ft (216 m)
- Time zone: UTC-6 (Central (CST))
  - Summer (DST): UTC-5 (CDT)
- Area code: 563
- GNIS feature ID: 455223

Cedar Bluff is an unincorporated community in Cedar County, Iowa, United States.

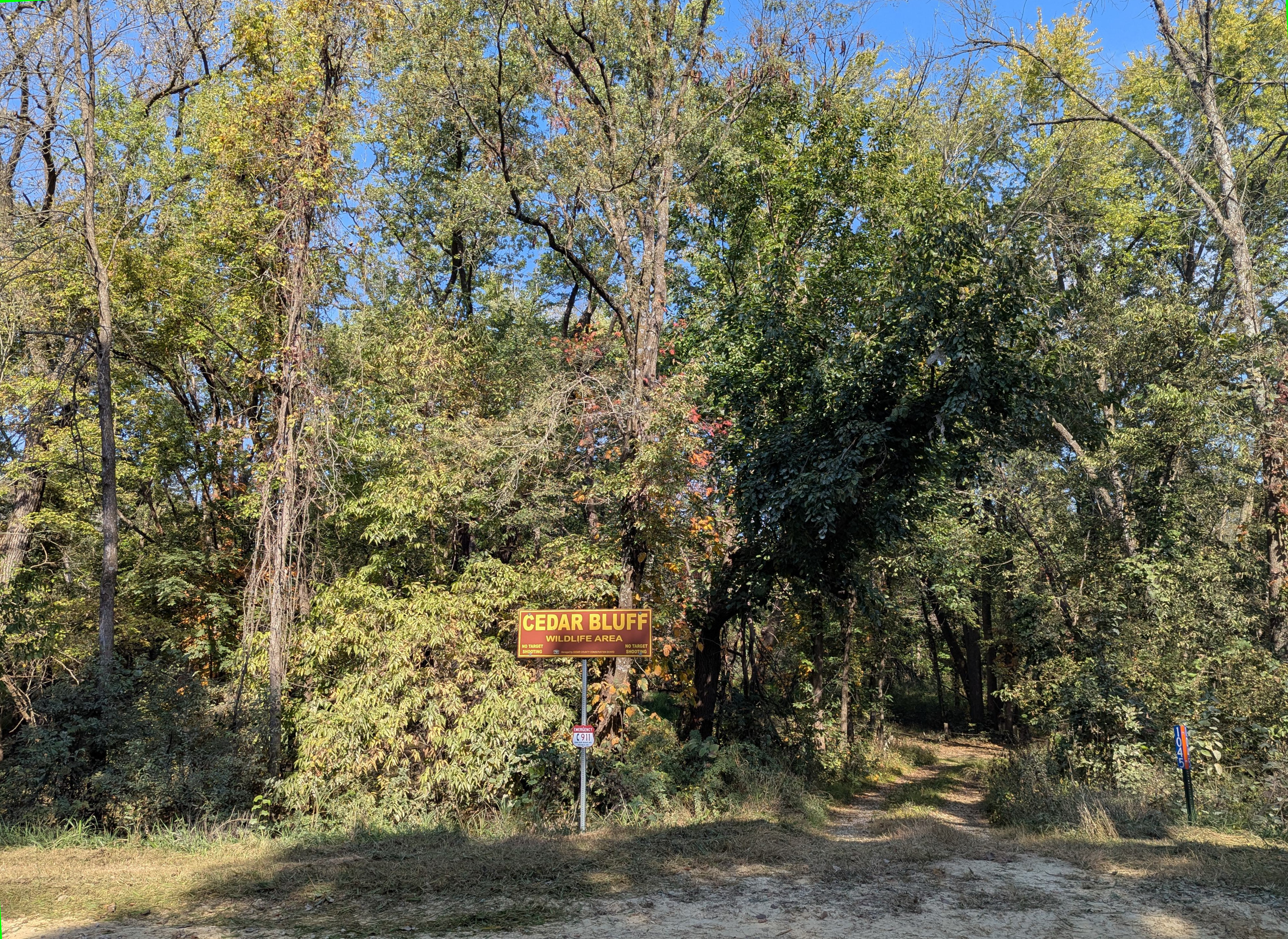
The entrance to the Cedar Bluff Wildlife Area

A post office was established here in 1841; it was then called Cedar River. In 1849, its name was changed to Gower's Ferry. It received its present name, Cedar Bluff, in 1859. The population was 59 in 1940.
