= Rochester, Iowa =

- Census-designated place
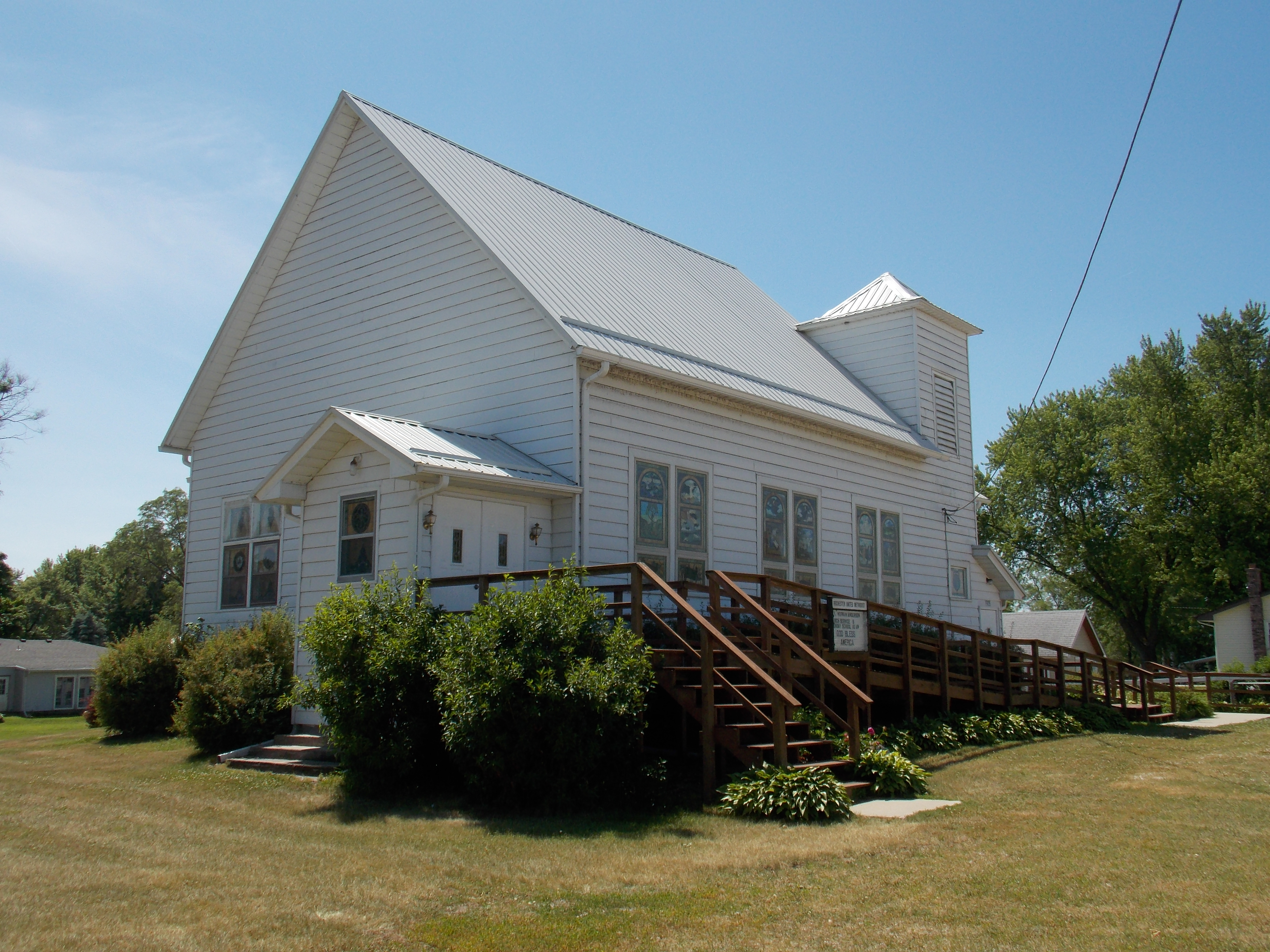
- Rochester United Methodist Church on 3rd Street

- Location within the state of Iowa
- Coordinates: 41°40′29″N 91°09′03″W
- Country: United States
- State: Iowa
- County: Cedar

Area
  - Total: 0.98 sq mi (2.53 km^{2})
  - Land: 0.95 sq mi (2.46 km^{2})
  - Water: 0.023 sq mi (0.06 km^{2})
- Elevation: 696 ft (212 m)

Population (2020)
  - Total: 142
  - Density: 149.2/sq mi (57.61/km^{2})
- Time zone: UTC-6 (Central (CST))
  - Summer (DST): UTC-5 (CDT)
- ZIP code: 52772
- FIPS code: 19-67890
- GNIS feature ID: 2629971

Rochester is an unincorporated community and census-designated place (CDP) in Rochester Township, Cedar County, Iowa, United States. As of the 2020 census it had a population of 142.

== History ==
Rochester is named after Rochester, New York. The city is known for its flour mills, due to its location on the Cedar River. Rochester's population was 53 in 1902.

== Geography ==
Rochester is located in eastern Iowa in south-central Cedar County, along the north bank of the Cedar River. County Road F44 crosses the river just south of the community, and Interstate 80 at Exit 265 is 2 miles (3 km) to the south.

== Demographics ==
=== 2020 census ===
As of the census of 2020, there were 142 people, 60 households, and 46 families residing in the community. The population density was 149.2 inhabitants per square mile (57.6/km^{2}). There were 60 housing units at an average density of 63.0 per square mile (24.3/km^{2}). The racial makeup of the community was 97.2% White, 0.0% Black or African American, 0.0% Native American, 0.0% Asian, 0.0% Pacific Islander, 0.0% from other races and 2.8% from two or more races. Hispanic or Latino persons of any race comprised 2.8% of the population.

Of the 60 households, 25.0% of which had children under the age of 18 living with them, 68.3% were married couples living together, 11.7% were cohabitating couples, 5.0% had a female householder with no spouse or partner present and 15.0% had a male householder with no spouse or partner present. 23.3% of all households were non-families. 15.0% of all households were made up of individuals, 1.7% had someone living alone who was 65 years old or older.

The median age in the community was 50.3 years. 24.6% of the residents were under the age of 20; 2.1% were between the ages of 20 and 24; 17.6% were from 25 and 44; 31.0% were from 45 and 64; and 24.6% were 65 years of age or older. The gender makeup of the community was 52.8% male and 47.2% female.

Historical population
| Census | Pop. | Note | %± |
|---|---|---|---|
| 2010 | 133 | | — |
| 2020 | 142 | | 6.8% |
U.S. Decennial Census

== Education ==
It is in the Tipton Community School District.

== Notable sites ==
Rochester Cemetery is one of the largest and most notable cemetery prairies in the United States. More than 350 species of indigenous American plants, some quite uncommon, are found in Rochester Cemetery, which contains one of the few remaining original North American prairie remnants in the state of Iowa. The cemetery has divided many in the community that think that it looks overgrown, while others appreciate the native feel.
