= Sugar Creek Township, Cedar County, Iowa =

Township in Iowa, US

Sugar Creek Township, Cedar County
- Township
- Coordinates: 41°38′30″N 091°03′19″W
- Country: United States
- State: Iowa
- County: Cedar

Area
  - Total: 24.24 sq mi (62.78 km^{2})
  - Land: 24.24 sq mi (62.78 km^{2})
  - Water: 0 sq mi (0 km^{2})
- Elevation: 738 ft (225 m)

Population (2000)
  - Total: 375
  - Density: 16/sq mi (6/km^{2})
- FIPS code: 19-94023
- GNIS feature ID: 0468756

Sugar Creek Township is one of seventeen townships in Cedar County, Iowa, United States. As of the 2000 census, its population was 375.

== History ==
Sugar Creek Township is named for the Sugar Creek. The name of the creek may refer to either the large number of sugar maples growing along it or to the sweetness of the water.

== Geography ==
Sugar Creek Township covers an area of 24.24 square miles (62.8 km^{2}) and contains no incorporated settlements. According to the USGS, it contains six cemeteries: Centerville, Lime City, Sharon, South Bethel, Sugar Creek Church, and Whitmer.
