= Dayton Township, Cedar County, Iowa =

Township in Iowa, US

Dayton Township, Cedar County
- Township
- Coordinates: 41°54′10″N 091°04′09″W
- Country: United States
- State: Iowa
- County: Cedar

Area
  - Total: 36.54 sq mi (94.64 km^{2})
  - Land: 36.54 sq mi (94.64 km^{2})
  - Water: 0 sq mi (0 km^{2})
- Elevation: 804 ft (245 m)

Population (2000)
  - Total: 1,282
  - Density: 35/sq mi (13.5/km^{2})
- FIPS code: 19-90906
- GNIS feature ID: 0467684

Dayton Township is one of seventeen townships in Cedar County, Iowa, United States. As of the 2000 census, its population was 1,282.

== Geography ==
Dayton Township covers an area of 36.54 square miles (94.6 km^{2}) and contains one incorporated settlement, Clarence. According to the USGS, it contains four cemeteries: Clarence, Dayton Valley, Onion Grove (historical) and Saint Johns.
