= Rochester Township, Cedar County, Iowa =

Township in Iowa, US

Rochester Township, Cedar County
- Township
- Coordinates: 41°39′56″N 091°07′39″W
- Country: United States
- State: Iowa
- County: Cedar

Area
  - Total: 27.03 sq mi (70.02 km^{2})
  - Land: 26.39 sq mi (68.35 km^{2})
  - Water: 0.65 sq mi (1.68 km^{2})
- Elevation: 696 ft (212 m)

Population (2000)
  - Total: 603
  - Density: 23/sq mi (8.8/km^{2})
- FIPS code: 19-93654
- GNIS feature ID: 0468626

Rochester Township is one of seventeen townships in Cedar County, Iowa, United States. As of the 2000 census, its population was 603.

== History ==
Rochester Township is named after Rochester, New York.

There are 3 cemeteries in the township, Hebron, Rochester and Healy. Township Trustees manage both Rochester and Hebron cemeteries while Healy is privately maintained

The town of Rochester used to be the county seat of Cedar County. The county seat was moved to the geographical center of Cedar County, which became Tipton. The reason they moved it to Tipton, is because they were afraid of losing important documents in the flood.

== Geography ==
Rochester Township covers an area of 27.03 square miles (70.0 km^{2}) and contains no incorporated settlements. The unincorporated community of Rochester, a census-designated place, is located along the Cedar River north of the center of the township. According to the USGS, the township contains two cemeteries: Healey and Hebron.
