= Plato, Iowa =

- Unincorporated community
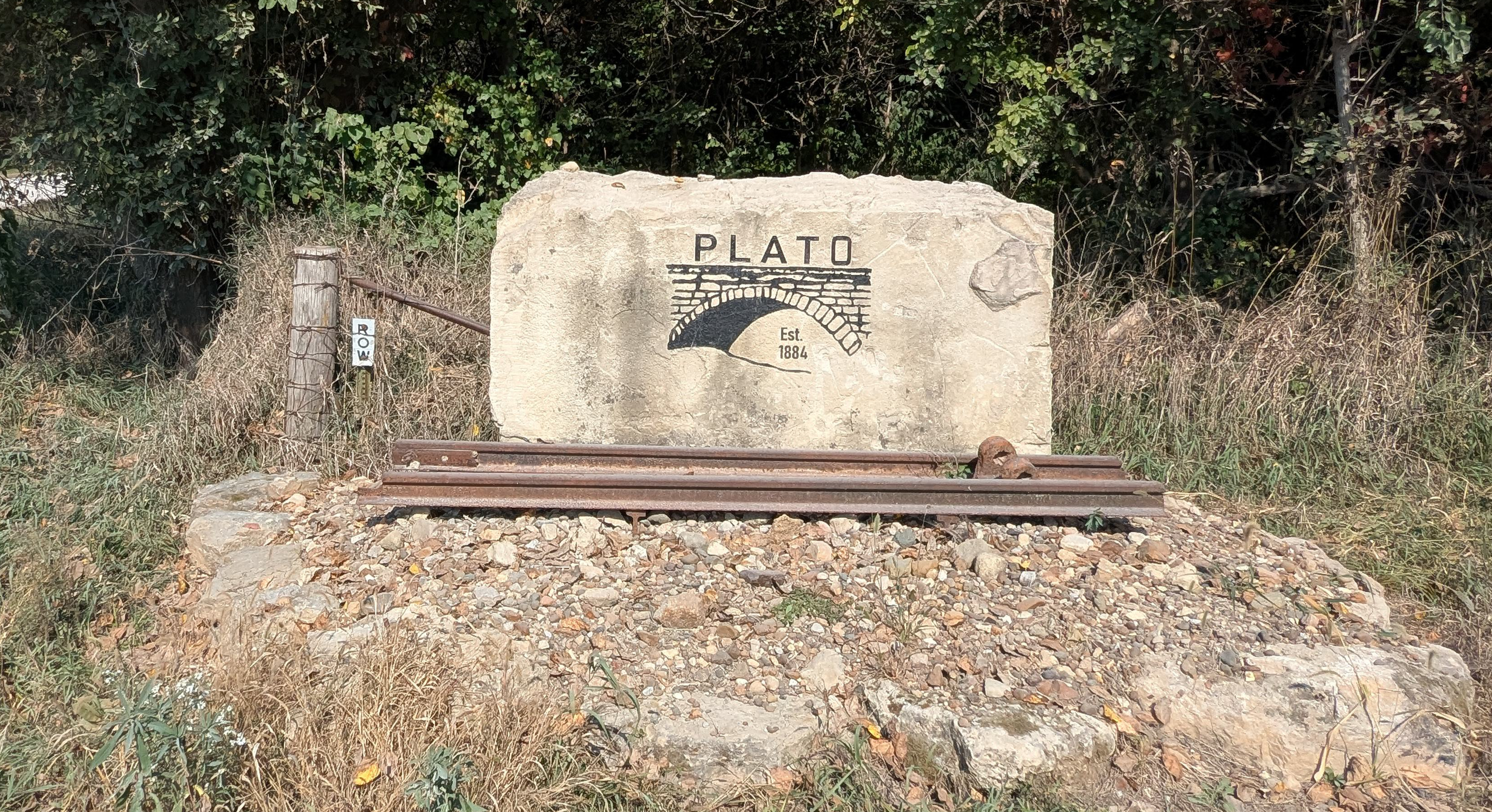
- Welcome sign in Plato

- Location within Iowa
- Coordinates: 41°44′17″N 91°18′31″W
- Country: United States
- State: Iowa
- County: Cedar
- Elevation: 709 ft (216 m)
- Time zone: UTC-6 (Central (CST))
  - Summer (DST): UTC-5 (CDT)
- Area code: 563
- GNIS feature ID: 464232

Plato is an unincorporated community in Cedar County, Iowa, United States. Plato is located at 41°44′17″N 91°18′31″W.

== History ==
The classical Greek philosopher Plato is the town's namesake. The population of the community was 12 in 1902, and 30 in 1925. The population was 10 in 1940.
