= Stanwood, Iowa =

- City
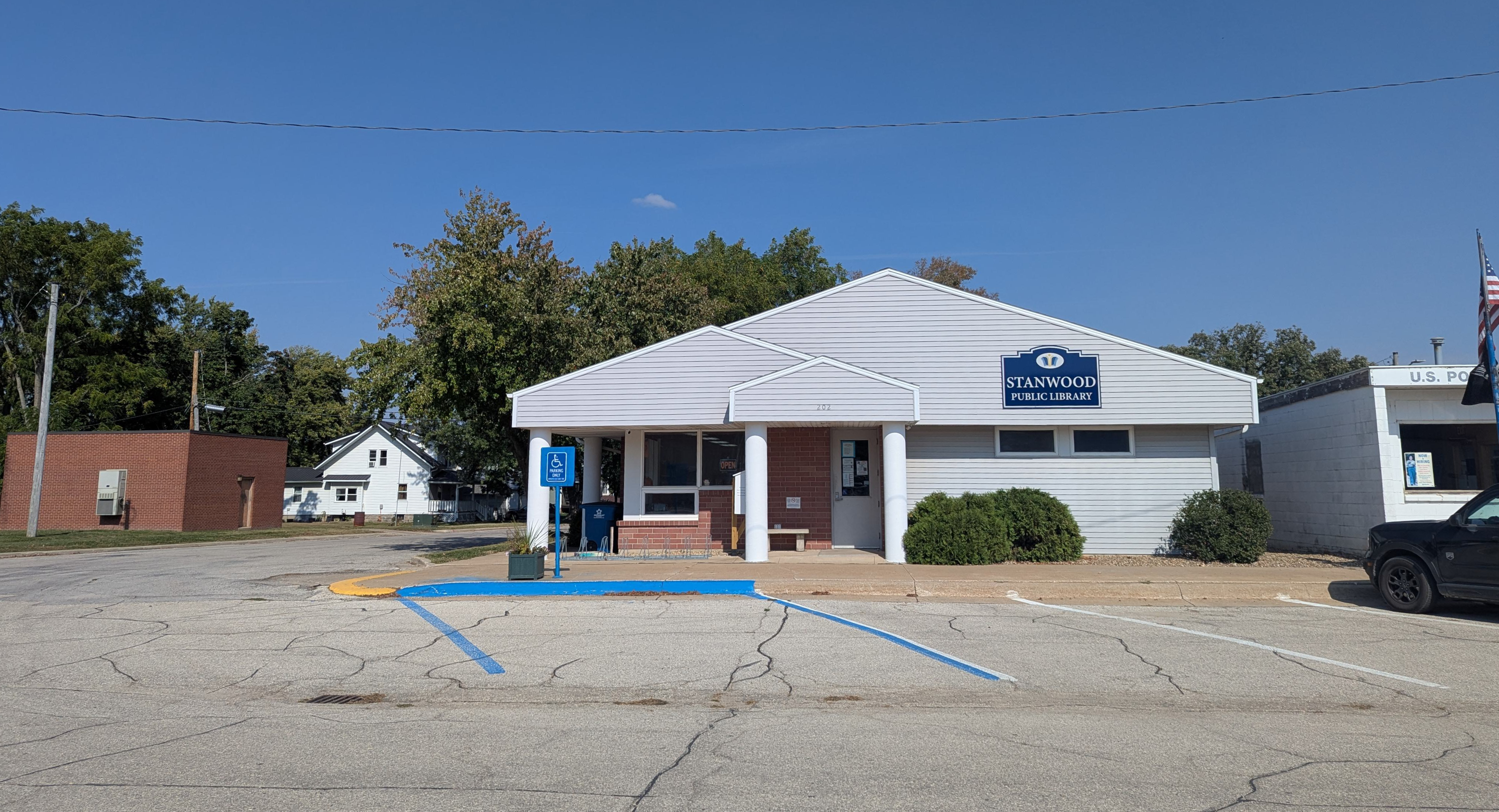
- Stanwood Public Library

- Location of Stanwood, Iowa
- Coordinates: 41°53′34″N 91°08′56″W
- Country: United States
- State: Iowa
- County: Cedar

Area
  - Total: 0.80 sq mi (2.06 km^{2})
  - Land: 0.80 sq mi (2.06 km^{2})
  - Water: 0 sq mi (0.00 km^{2})
- Elevation: 843 ft (257 m)

Population (2020)
  - Total: 637
  - Density: 800.5/sq mi (309.09/km^{2})
- Time zone: UTC-6 (Central (CST))
  - Summer (DST): UTC-5 (CDT)
- ZIP code: 52337
- Area code: 563
- FIPS code: 19-75045
- GNIS feature ID: 2395954
- Website: Official website

Stanwood is a city in Cedar County, Iowa, United States. The population was 637 at the time of the 2020 census.

== History ==
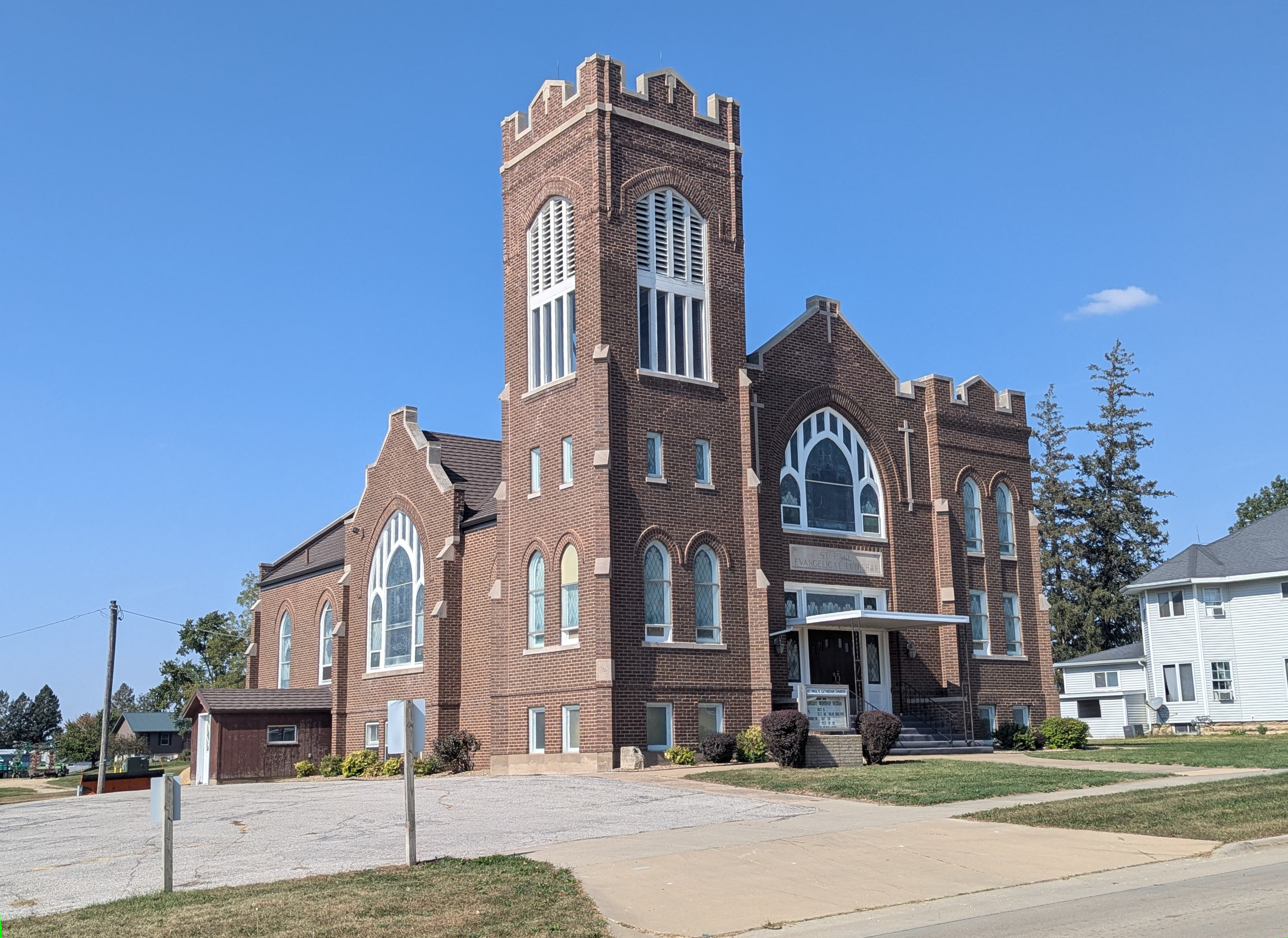
St. Paul's Lutheran Church in Stanwood

Stanwood was platted in 1868. The first house was built in Stanwood in 1869. The city was named for H. P. Stanwood, a railroad official.

== Geography ==
According to the United States Census Bureau, the city has a total area of 0.72 square miles (1.86 km^{2}), all land.

== Demographics ==
Historical populations
Year	Pop.	±%
1870	257	—
1880	254	−1.2%
1890	302	+18.9%
1900	415	+37.4%
1910	511	+23.1%
1920	556	+8.8%
1930	531	−4.5%
1940	569	+7.2%
1950	547	−3.9%
1960	598	+9.3%
1970	642	+7.4%
1980	705	+9.8%
1990	646	−8.4%
2000	680	+5.3%
2010	684	+0.6%
2020	637	−6.9%
Source:"U.S. Census website". United States Census Bureau. and Iowa Data Center; Source: U.S. Decennial Census

=== 2020 census ===
As of the census of 2020, there were 637 people, 268 households, and 177 families residing in the city. The population density was 800.6 inhabitants per square mile (309.1/km^{2}). There were 288 housing units at an average density of 361.9 per square mile (139.7/km^{2}). The racial makeup of the city was 93.6% White, 1.4% Black or African American, 0.5% Native American, 0.0% Asian, 0.0% Pacific Islander, 0.2% from other races and 4.4% from two or more races. Hispanic or Latino persons of any race comprised 1.7% of the population.

Of the 268 households, 34.0% of which had children under the age of 18 living with them, 48.1% were married couples living together, 10.1% were cohabitating couples, 21.6% had a female householder with no spouse or partner present and 20.1% had a male householder with no spouse or partner present. 34.0% of all households were non-families. 26.9% of all households were made up of individuals, 10.8% had someone living alone who was 65 years old or older.

The median age in the city was 40.3 years. 25.7% of the residents were under the age of 20; 5.7% were between the ages of 20 and 24; 23.2% were from 25 and 44; 29.4% were from 45 and 64; and 16.0% were 65 years of age or older. The gender makeup of the city was 50.9% male and 49.1% female.

=== 2010 census ===
As of the census of 2010, there were 684 people, 275 households, and 192 families living in the city. The population density was 950.0 inhabitants per square mile (366.8/km^{2}). There were 295 housing units at an average density of 409.7 per square mile (158.2/km^{2}). The racial makeup of the city was 97.1% White, 0.3% African American, 0.6% Asian, 0.3% from other races, and 1.8% from two or more races. Hispanic or Latino of any race were 2.2% of the population.

There were 275 households, of which 34.5% had children under the age of 18 living with them, 49.1% were married couples living together, 14.2% had a female householder with no husband present, 6.5% had a male householder with no wife present, and 30.2% were non-families. 26.2% of all households were made up of individuals, and 11.3% had someone living alone who was 65 years of age or older. The average household size was 2.49 and the average family size was 2.97.

The median age in the city was 40.3 years. 26.8% of residents were under the age of 18; 6.7% were between the ages of 18 and 24; 22.6% were from 25 to 44; 27.8% were from 45 to 64; and 16.1% were 65 years of age or older. The gender makeup of the city was 49.3% male and 50.7% female.

=== 2000 census ===
As of the census of 2000, there were 680 people, 279 households, and 193 families living in the city. The population density was 1,059.9 inhabitants per square mile (409.2/km^{2}). There were 297 housing units at an average density of 462.9 per square mile (178.7/km^{2}). The racial makeup of the city was 97.79% White, 0.29% African American, 0.44% Native American, 0.29% Asian, and 1.18% from two or more races. Hispanic or Latino of any race were 0.15% of the population.

There were 279 households, out of which 30.5% had children under the age of 18 living with them, 59.9% were married couples living together, 7.9% had a female householder with no husband present, and 30.8% were non-families. 25.4% of all households were made up of individuals, and 12.2% had someone living alone who was 65 years of age or older. The average household size was 2.44 and the average family size was 2.94.

In the city, the population was spread out, with 24.1% under the age of 18, 6.9% from 18 to 24, 28.2% from 25 to 44, 24.3% from 45 to 64, and 16.5% who were 65 years of age or older. The median age was 38 years. For every 100 females, there were 101.2 males. For every 100 females age 18 and over, there were 95.5 males.

The median income for a household in the city was $37,102, and the median income for a family was $42,143. Males had a median income of $30,781 versus $21,691 for females. The per capita income for the city was $16,561. About 7.2% of families and 7.4% of the population were below the poverty line, including 10.8% of those under age 18 and 5.8% of those age 65 or over.

== Education ==
The North Cedar Community School District serves the community. It was established on July 1, 1995, by the merger of the Clarence-Lowden Community School District and the Lincoln Community School District.
