= Mechanicsville, Iowa =

- City
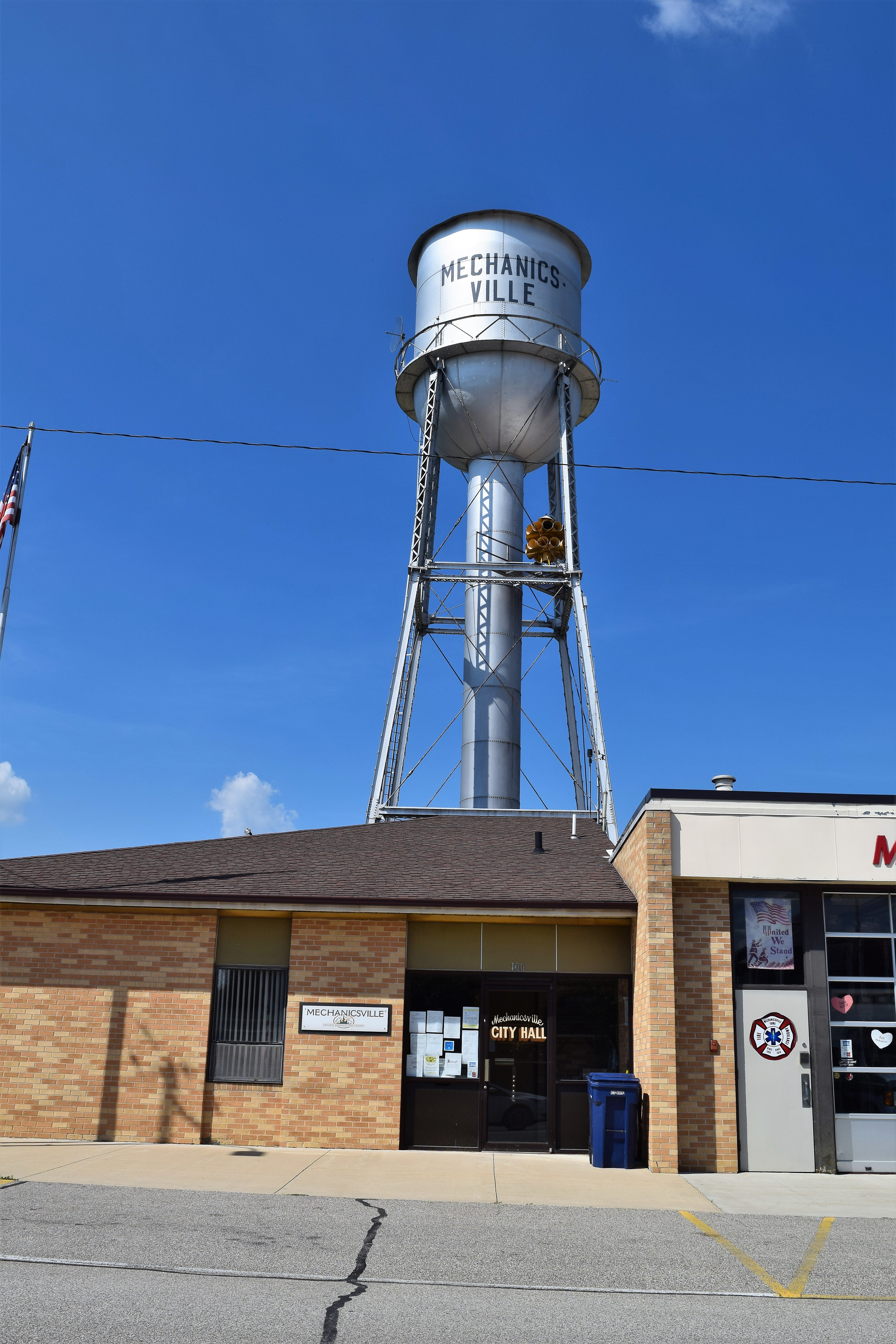
- Mechanicsville city hall and water tower

- Location of Mechanicsville, Iowa
- Coordinates: 41°54′21″N 91°15′01″W
- Country: United States
- State: Iowa
- County: Cedar

Government
  - Type: Mayor-council
  - Mayor: Andrew J. Oberbreckling

Area
  - Total: 0.83 sq mi (2.14 km^{2})
  - Land: 0.83 sq mi (2.14 km^{2})
  - Water: 0.0039 sq mi (0.01 km^{2})
- Elevation: 899 ft (274 m)

Population (2020)
  - Total: 1,020
  - Density: 1,237.2/sq mi (477.67/km^{2})
- Time zone: UTC-6 (Central (CST))
  - Summer (DST): UTC-5 (CDT)
- ZIP code: 52306
- Area code: 563
- FIPS code: 19-50700
- GNIS feature ID: 2395079
- Website: www.cityofmechanicsville.net

Mechanicsville is a city in Cedar County, Iowa, United States. The population was 1,020 at the time of the 2020 census.

== History ==
Mechanicsville was platted in 1855 by Daniel A. Comstock. It was so named from the fact several of its first settlers were mechanics. A fire in 1883 destroyed the south side of the business district.

== Geography ==
According to the United States Census Bureau, the city has a total area of 0.83 square miles (2.15 km^{2}), all land.

== Demographics ==
Historical populations
Year	Pop.	±%
1860	195	—
1870	628	+222.1%
1880	545	−13.2%
1890	612	+12.3%
1900	703	+14.9%
1910	817	+16.2%
1920	812	−0.6%
1930	781	−3.8%
1940	821	+5.1%
1950	850	+3.5%
1960	866	+1.9%
1970	989	+14.2%
1980	1,166	+17.9%
1990	1,075	−7.8%
2000	1,173	+9.1%
2010	1,146	−2.3%
2020	1,020	−11.0%
Source:"U.S. Census website". United States Census Bureau. and Iowa Data Center; Source: U.S. Decennial Census

=== 2020 census ===
As of the 2020 census, there were 1,020 people, 459 households, and 279 families residing in the city. The population density was 1,237.2 inhabitants per square mile (477.7/km^{2}). The median age was 48.3 years. 18.6% of residents were under the age of 18 and 23.0% were 65 years of age or older. For every 100 females, there were 91.7 males, and for every 100 females age 18 and over there were 90.8 males age 18 and over.

0.0% of residents lived in urban areas, while 100.0% lived in rural areas.

Of households, 22.7% had children under the age of 18 living with them. Of all households, 47.5% were married couples living together, 10.5% were cohabitating couples, 19.2% had a male householder with no spouse or partner present, and 22.9% had a female householder with no spouse or partner present. 39.2% of all households were non-families. 31.8% of all households were made up of individuals, and 15.3% had someone living alone who was 65 years of age or older.

There were 488 housing units at an average density of 591.9 per square mile (228.5/km^{2}), of which 5.9% were vacant. The homeowner vacancy rate was 0.3% and the rental vacancy rate was 6.0%.

Racial composition as of the 2020 census
Race	Number	Percent
White	963	94.4%
Black or African American	8	0.8%
American Indian and Alaska Native	5	0.5%
Asian	4	0.4%
Native Hawaiian and Other Pacific Islander	0	0.0%
Some other race	7	0.7%
Two or more races	33	3.2%
Hispanic or Latino (of any race)	31	3.0%

=== 2010 census ===
As of the census of 2010, there were 1,146 people, 471 households, and 315 families living in the city. The population density was 1,380.7 inhabitants per square mile (533.1/km^{2}). There were 496 housing units at an average density of 597.6 units per square mile (230.7 units/km^{2}). The racial makeup of the city was 97.8% White, 0.3% African American, 0.2% Native American, 0.3% Asian, 0.3% from other races, and 1.0% from two or more races. Hispanic or Latino of any race were 1.7% of the population.

There were 471 households, of which 28.7% had children under the age of 18 living with them, 52.4% were married couples living together, 8.9% had a female householder with no husband present, 5.5% had a male householder with no wife present, and 33.1% were non-families. 28.2% of all households were made up of individuals, and 14.3% had someone living alone who was 65 years of age or older. The average household size was 2.34 and the average family size was 2.83.

The median age in the city was 43.1 years. 22.9% of residents were under the age of 18; 6.9% were between the ages of 18 and 24; 22.7% were from 25 to 44; 29.2% were from 45 to 64; and 18.5% were 65 years of age or older. The gender makeup of the city was 47.8% male and 52.2% female.

=== 2000 census ===
As of the census of 2000, there were 1,173 people, 452 households, and 312 families living in the city. The population density was 1,582.5 inhabitants per square mile (611.0/km^{2}). There were 479 housing units at an average density of 646.2 units per square mile (249.5 units/km^{2}). The racial makeup of the city was 98.21% White, 0.09% African American, 0.51% Native American, 0.09% Asian, 0.09% from other races, and 1.02% from two or more races. Hispanic or Latino of any race were 1.36% of the population.

There were 452 households, out of which 33.8% had children under the age of 18 living with them, 54.6% were married couples living together, 9.5% had a female householder with no husband present, and 30.8% were non-families. 27.0% of all households were made up of individuals, and 14.8% had someone living alone who was 65 years of age or older. The average household size was 2.46 and the average family size was 2.97.

25.5% are under the age of 18, 7.9% from 18 to 24, 27.8% from 25 to 44, 19.0% from 45 to 64, and 19.8% who were 65 years of age or older. The median age was 38 years. For every 100 females, there were 90.1 males. For every 100 females age 18 and over, there were 84.4 males.

The median income for a household in the city was $36,053, and the median income for a family was $44,500. Males had a median income of $32,054 versus $23,125 for females. The per capita income for the city was $16,429. About 5.8% of families and 7.9% of the population were below the poverty line, including 11.4% of those under age 18 and 6.0% of those age 65 or over.

== Education ==
The North Cedar Community School District serves the community. It was established on July 1, 1995, by the merger of the Clarence-Lowden Community School District and the Lincoln Community School District.
