= Lowden, Iowa =

- City
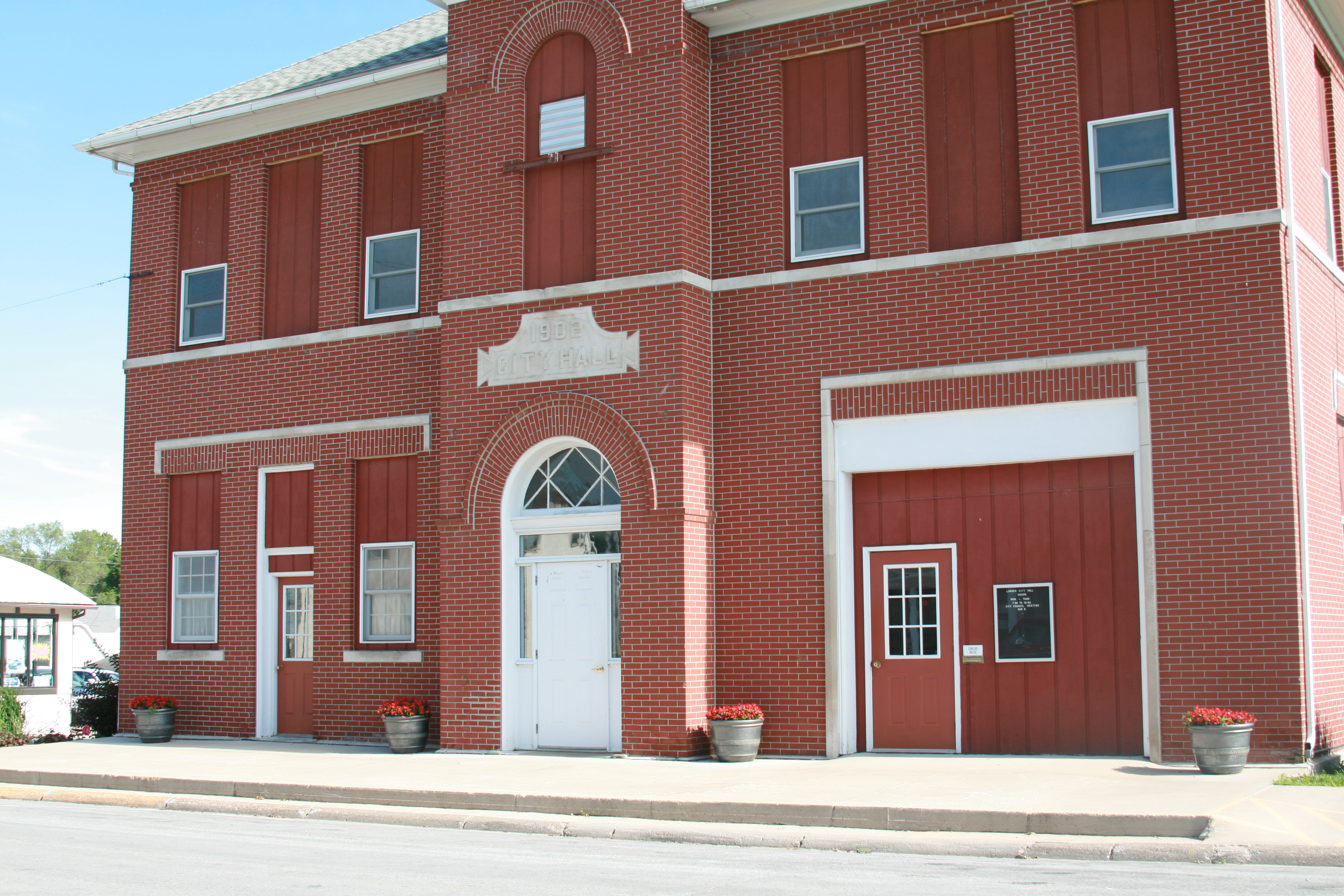
- Lowden City Hall in downtown on Main Street

- Location of Lowden, Iowa
- Coordinates: 41°51′32″N 90°55′22″W
- Country: United States
- State: Iowa
- County: Cedar

Government
  - Mayor: Derrick Lange

Area
  - Total: 1.07 sq mi (2.78 km^{2})
  - Land: 1.07 sq mi (2.78 km^{2})
  - Water: 0 sq mi (0.00 km^{2})
- Elevation: 732 ft (223 m)

Population (2020)
  - Total: 807
  - Density: 751.8/sq mi (290.28/km^{2})
- Time zone: UTC-6 (Central (CST))
  - Summer (DST): UTC-5 (CDT)
- ZIP code: 52255
- Area code: 563
- FIPS code: 19-46920
- GNIS feature ID: 2395777
- Website: Official website

Lowden is a city in Cedar County, Iowa, United States. The population was 807 at the time of the 2020 census.

== History ==
Lowden (historically spelled Louden) was platted in 1857 at the time the Chicago and North Western Railway was projected to be built in the neighborhood. It is named after Loudonville, Ohio, the former hometown of one of its early settlers.

== Geography ==
According to the United States Census Bureau, the city has a total area of 1.02 square miles (2.64 km^{2}), all land.

=== Climate ===
Climate data for Lowden, Iowa (1991–2020)
Month	Jan	Feb	Mar	Apr	May	Jun	Jul	Aug	Sep	Oct	Nov	Dec	Year
Mean daily maximum °F (°C)	29.1 (−1.6)	34.2 (1.2)	47.6 (8.7)	61.6 (16.4)	73.2 (22.9)	82.0 (27.8)	85.2 (29.6)	83.2 (28.4)	77.0 (25.0)	64.0 (17.8)	48.2 (9.0)	34.3 (1.3)	60.0 (15.5)
Daily mean °F (°C)	20.3 (−6.5)	24.7 (−4.1)	37.1 (2.8)	49.4 (9.7)	61.4 (16.3)	70.9 (21.6)	73.7 (23.2)	71.5 (21.9)	64.0 (17.8)	51.5 (10.8)	37.8 (3.2)	26.0 (−3.3)	49.0 (9.5)
Mean daily minimum °F (°C)	11.6 (−11.3)	15.2 (−9.3)	26.6 (−3.0)	37.2 (2.9)	49.6 (9.8)	59.9 (15.5)	62.1 (16.7)	59.8 (15.4)	50.9 (10.5)	38.9 (3.8)	27.4 (−2.6)	17.8 (−7.9)	38.1 (3.4)
Average precipitation inches (mm)	1.58 (40)	1.80 (46)	2.80 (71)	4.10 (104)	4.48 (114)	5.08 (129)	4.55 (116)	4.14 (105)	3.55 (90)	3.16 (80)	2.31 (59)	2.04 (52)	39.59 (1,006)
Average snowfall inches (cm)	11.2 (28)	8.0 (20)	6.2 (16)	1.7 (4.3)	0.0 (0.0)	0.0 (0.0)	0.0 (0.0)	0.0 (0.0)	0.0 (0.0)	0.7 (1.8)	2.9 (7.4)	9.1 (23)	39.8 (100.5)
Source: NOAA

== Demographics ==
Historical populations
Year	Pop.	±%
1890	405	—
1900	544	+34.3%
1910	584	+7.4%
1920	655	+12.2%
1930	697	+6.4%
1940	645	−7.5%
1950	642	−0.5%
1960	641	−0.2%
1970	667	+4.1%
1980	717	+7.5%
1990	726	+1.3%
2000	794	+9.4%
2010	789	−0.6%
2020	807	+2.3%
Source:"U.S. Census website". United States Census Bureau. and Iowa Data Center; Source: U.S. Decennial Census

=== 2020 census ===
As of the census of 2020, there were 807 people, 359 households, and 229 families residing in the city. The population density was 751.8 inhabitants per square mile (290.3/km^{2}). There were 371 housing units at an average density of 345.6 per square mile (133.5/km^{2}). The racial makeup of the city was 95.5% White, 0.0% Black or African American, 0.4% Native American, 0.4% Asian, 0.0% Pacific Islander, 0.2% from other races and 3.5% from two or more races. Hispanic or Latino persons of any race comprised 1.0% of the population.

Of the 359 households, 28.4% of which had children under the age of 18 living with them, 45.7% were married couples living together, 9.2% were cohabitating couples, 28.4% had a female householder with no spouse or partner present and 16.7% had a male householder with no spouse or partner present. 36.2% of all households were non-families. 29.5% of all households were made up of individuals, 16.7% had someone living alone who was 65 years old or older.

The median age in the city was 42.3 years. 26.0% of the residents were under the age of 20; 4.2% were between the ages of 20 and 24; 22.4% were from 25 and 44; 25.4% were from 45 and 64; and 21.9% were 65 years of age or older. The gender makeup of the city was 49.3% male and 50.7% female.

=== 2010 census ===
As of the census of 2010, there were 789 people, 346 households, and 221 families living in the city. The population density was 773.5 inhabitants per square mile (298.7/km^{2}). There were 371 housing units at an average density of 363.7 per square mile (140.4/km^{2}). The racial makeup of the city was 99.1% White, 0.1% African American, 0.3% from other races, and 0.5% from two or more races. Hispanic or Latino of any race were 0.8% of the population.

There were 346 households, of which 27.5% had children under the age of 18 living with them, 49.4% were married couples living together, 8.7% had a female householder with no husband present, 5.8% had a male householder with no wife present, and 36.1% were non-families. 31.8% of all households were made up of individuals, and 20.5% had someone living alone who was 65 years of age or older. The average household size was 2.28 and the average family size was 2.82.

The median age in the city was 42.9 years. 22.8% of residents were under the age of 18; 7.6% were between the ages of 18 and 24; 22.1% were from 25 to 44; 23.8% were from 45 to 64; and 23.6% were 65 years of age or older. The gender makeup of the city was 47.9% male and 52.1% female.

=== 2000 census ===
As of the census of 2000, there were 794 people, 342 households, and 230 families living in the city. The population density was 785.3 inhabitants per square mile (303.2/km^{2}). There were 359 housing units at an average density of 355.0 per square mile (137.1/km^{2}). The racial makeup of the city was 99.12% White, 0.13% African American, 0.13% Asian, 0.63% from other races. Hispanic or Latino of any race were 1.13% of the population.

There were 342 households, out of which 26.3% had children under the age of 18 living with them, 59.1% were married couples living together, 6.1% had a female householder with no husband present, and 32.5% were non-families. 30.4% of all households were made up of individuals, and 18.1% had someone living alone who was 65 years of age or older. The average household size was 2.32 and the average family size was 2.84.

23.9% are under the age of 18, 4.5% from 18 to 24, 26.6% from 25 to 44, 21.5% from 45 to 64, and 23.4% who were 65 years of age or older. The median age was 42 years. For every 100 females, there were 92.3 males. For every 100 females age 18 and over, there were 84.1 males.

The median income for a household in the city was $35,714, and the median income for a family was $45,735. Males had a median income of $32,679 versus $24,063 for females. The per capita income for the city was $18,303. About 4.3% of families and 6.0% of the population were below the poverty line, including 4.3% of those under age 18 and 14.5% of those age 65 or over.

== Parks and recreation ==
Lowden Memorial Park is 17-acre (6.9 ha) park featuring baseball diamonds, disc golf, and a walking path.

== Education ==
The North Cedar Community School District serves the community. It was established on July 1, 1995 by the merger of the Clarence-Lowden Community School District and the Lincoln Community School District. The former was formed on July 1, 1973 by the merger of the Clarence and Lowden school districts.

== Infrastructure ==
Lowden has 20 EMS members and volunteer firemen.
