= Amber, Iowa =

- Unincorporated community
- Location within Iowa Location within the United States
- Coordinates: 42°07′41″N 91°10′49″W
- Country: United States
- State: Iowa
- County: Jones
- Elevation: 1,027 ft (313 m)
- Time zone: UTC-6 ((CST))
  - Summer (DST): UTC-5 (CDT)
- ZIP code: 52205
- Area code: 319
- GNIS feature ID: 454164

Amber is an unincorporated community in Jones County, Iowa, United States. It is located northeast of Anamosa, northwest of Center Junction, south of Monticello and north of Olin. Amber is located approximately in the center of Jones County.

== History ==
What would become Amber started with the Midland railroad depot of the Chicago & North-Western Railway. The founders of Amber were the Hartmans, the Sanfords and J.C. Ramsey. Mrs. C.E. Sanford & son opened a general store and J.C. Ramsey was the agent for the Midland depot. The post office was established in 1873 with T. Hartman being the first postmaster, he was also a trustee for Wayne Township. Originally called Blue Cut, due to a wide strip of blue clay nearby, the name was changed to Amber on July 1, 1878. Amber was named after a character in a novel that a resident had read.

The population of Amber was 82 in 1940.

== Hula Hoop Tree ==
Amber was the home of the Hula Hoop Tree from 2015 until it was cut down in 2020. The lifeless tree which was made so after having been set ablaze not long after the first hula hoops were hoisted upon it, was decorated with hundreds of the plastic hula hoops before it was felled. The tree had its own Facebook page, which remains up despite the tree being down.

Nobody knew why the first hoops came to rest upon the tree but after the initial plastic rings many more hoops made their way onto it. Because the first two hoops appeared after a 2015 storm, there remains the possibility that a guest of wind carried them up there.

== Education ==
Anamosa Community School District operates local area public schools.

== In popular culture ==
During his research for his book Culture Warlords Amber was chosen by the journalist Tal Lavin as the residence of "Ashlynn", a persona which was a honeypot for the white nationalist dating site WhiteDate. A parody of the perfect Aryan female, Lavin had simply plopped "Ashlynn" in the Midwest.
