= 1953 Sarnia tornado outbreak =

Weather event in the United States and Canada

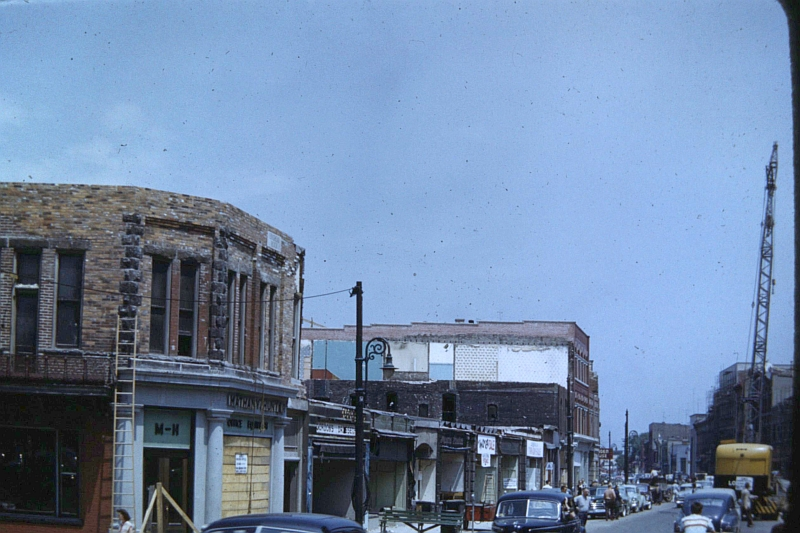
- Damage in Sarnia, Ontario as seen a couple of days following a large F4 tornado.

Meteorological history
- Formed: May 20, 1953
- Dissipated: May 21, 1953

Tornado outbreak
- Tornadoes: 3
- Max. rating: F4 tornado
- Duration: 27 hours

Overall effects
- Fatalities: 8 (+1 non-tornadic)
- Injuries: 123
- Damage: ≥$17.6 million (1953 USD) ≥$212 million (2025 USD)
- Areas affected: Iowa, Michigan, Ontario
- Part of the tornado outbreaks of 1953

The 1953 Sarnia tornado outbreak was a localized but devastating series of severe thunderstorms that affected the Great Lakes region during May 20-21, 1953. The strongest of these storms produced three intense, long-tracked tornadoes in Iowa, Michigan, and Ontario. The worst tornado event was a violent F4 tornado that tore through the cities of Port Huron, Michigan, and Sarnia, Ontario, on May 21, damaging or destroying hundreds of structures and causing dozens of casualties. Overall, the tornadoes killed eight people, injured 123 others, and caused at least $17.6 million (1953 USD) in damage. (Note: An outbreak is generally defined as a group of at least six tornadoes (the number sometimes varies slightly according to local climatology) with no more than a six-hour gap between individual tornadoes. An outbreak sequence, prior to (after) the start of modern records in 1950, is defined as a period of no more than two (one) consecutive days without at least one significant (F2 or stronger) tornado.) Thunderstorm winds also caused an additional fatality when a tree fell on a house in Waterloo, Iowa.

== Meteorological synopsis ==
A low pressure system formed over south central Montana early on May 20, 1953. This low moved eastward into South Dakota as favorable conditions to its east generated scattered severe thunderstorms across the Upper Midwest thanks in part to another low that was moving northeastward through Ontario. Continuing eastward, the original low moved into Minnesota by May 21 as it made a gradual northeastward turn, producing more severe weather across Ohio and Michigan until a high-pressure system pushed out of the area.

== Confirmed tornadoes ==
Confirmed tornadoes by Fujita rating
FU	F0	F1	F2	F3	F4	F5	Total
0	0	0	0	2	1	0	3

- According to Thomas P. Grazulis, an F2 tornado destroyed or damaged a motel and several barns as it affected six farms near Chelsea and Blairstown, Iowa before causing severe damage in Fairfax, on May 20. The tornado reportedly struck Tama and Benton counties in Iowa. However, it is not officially listed. It is also possible that this was actually the beginning stage of second Iowa F3 tornado listed below.

=== May 20 event ===
List of confirmed tornadoes – Wednesday, May 20, 1953 (Note: All dates are based on the local time zone where the tornado touched down; however, all times are in Coordinated Universal Time for consistency.)
F#	Location	County / Parish	State	Start Coord.	Time (UTC)	Path length	Max width	Summary
F3	NE of Zenorsville to SW of Lime Springs	Story, Hardin, Butler, Chicasaw, Howard	IA	42.15°N 93.7°W	03:00–04:25	116.1 mi (186.8 km)	400 yd (370 m)	1 death – A long-tracked, strong tornado family caused major damage while passing through the rural communities of Story City, Hubbard, Ackley, and Southern Alta Vista with most concentrated damage occurring at the later towns. The first member of the family felled trees and was observed as a narrow funnel near Charles City. Many barns, outbuildings, and a silo were destroyed on at least 10 farms. The tornado family also killed hundreds of chickens. The sole fatality came from a farmer who had a heart attack while he was working in a field when the storm struck and therefore indirectly attributable to the tornado at most. No damage value was given for the tornado. Tornado researcher Thomas P. Grazulis assessed the tornado family as having caused F2-level damage.
F3	Eastern Cedar Rapids to Martelle to NNW of Wyoming	Linn, Jones	IA	41.98°N 91.57°W	04:10–05:10	38.6 mi (62.1 km)	400 yd (370 m)	A strong tornado touched down in Vernon View on the eastern side of Cedar Rapids and tracked east-northeastward through mainly rural areas, hitting the town of Martelle and striking areas near Morley before dissipating halfway between Onslow and Wyoming. In all, the tornado affected 10 farms, destroyed or damaged several barns, and unroofed a house. Seven people were injured; four in Linn County and three in Jones County. As listed above, the tornado possibly started as far back as Chelsea, giving it a track of 72 miles (116 km); however it is not officially listed as such. Grazulis classified the tornado as an F2.

=== May 21 event ===
List of confirmed tornadoes – Thursday, May 21, 1953
F#	Location	County / Parish	State / Province	Start Coord.	Time (UTC)	Path length	Max width	Summary
F4	N of Smiths Creek, MI to Port Huron, MI to Sarnia, ON to S of Stratford, ON	St. Clair (MI), Lambton (ON), Middlesex (ON)	MI, ON	41.73°N 98.93°W	21:21–00:00	75–90 mi (121–145 km)	1,760–2,640 yd (1,610–2,410 m)	7 deaths – See article on this tornado – 117 people were injured and losses totaled $17.6 million (1953 USD).

=== Port Huron, Michigan–Sarnia, Ontario ===
Port Huron, Michigan–Sarnia, Ontario
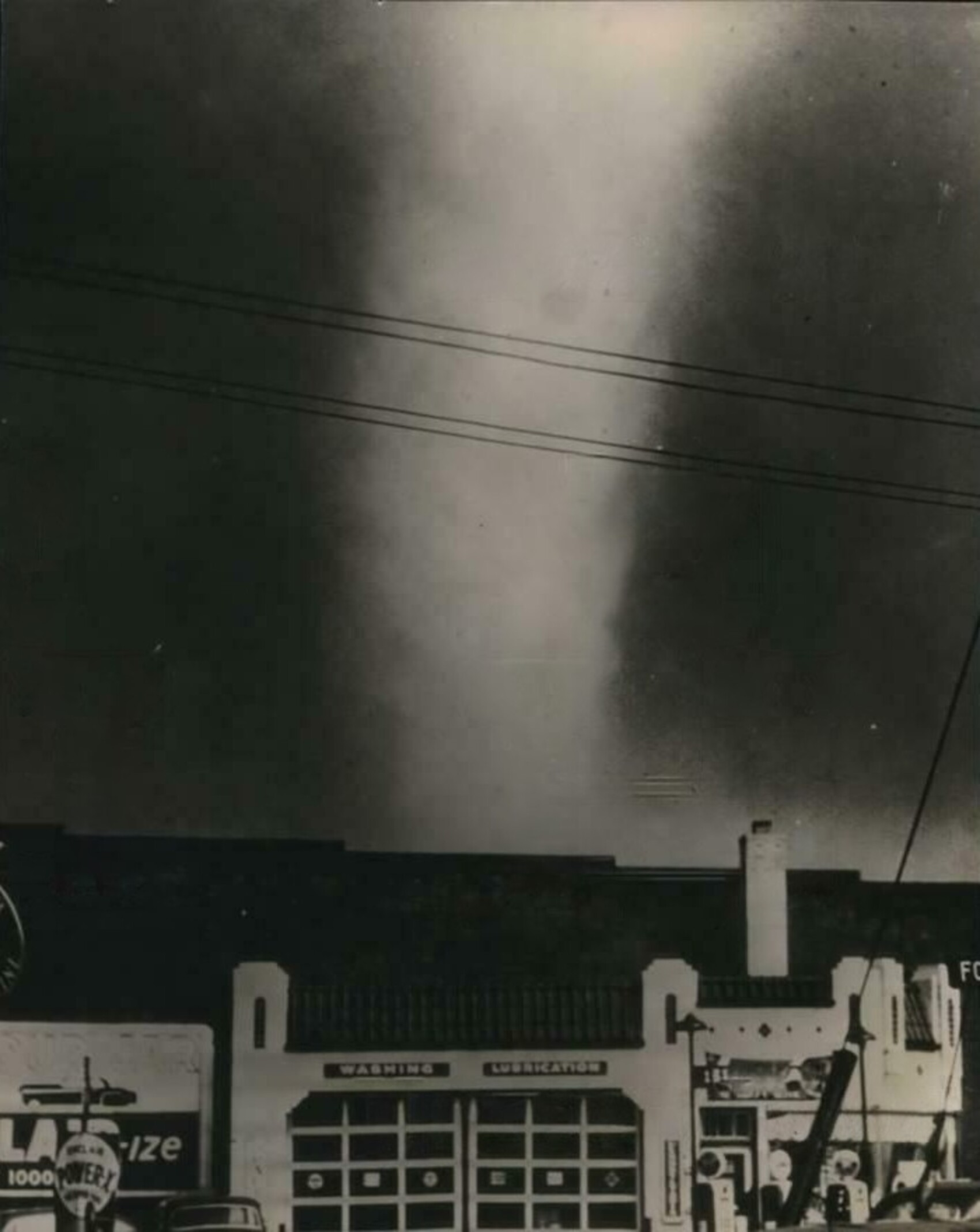
- The tornado as it tracked through Port Huron.

F4 tornado
- on the Fujita scale

Overall effects
- Fatalities: 7
- Injuries: 117
- Damage: $17.6 million (1953 USD)

This large, violent tornado touched down at 4:21 p.m. EST near Smiths Creek, Michigan, southwest of Port Huron. It moved northeast and quickly strengthened before hitting Port Huron, resulting in widespread F3 and F4 damage. Two people were killed in Port Huron and 68 more were injured. Close to 400 homes were damaged or destroyed in the United States with monetary losses totaling $2.6 million ($24.4 million 2018 USD). Crossing the St. Clair River, the 1-mile-wide (1.6 km) tornado moved into Canada just south of Sarnia Harbour. Moving to the northeast, the tornado moved directly through Sarnia, Ontario, where almost 100 commercial buildings sustained damage. At least 150 homes on the more suburban outskirts of the city were damaged and in some instances reduced to rubble. Five people were killed in Sarnia. Before exiting Sarnia, the tornado curved even further to the northeast and began to weaken, as its path narrowed to approximately 30 m (33 yd) across. The tornado then restrengthened as it moved into rural Lambton and Middlesex Counties, where more F4 damage was inflicted upon farmsteads and homes near Nairn, before it dissipated south of Stratford. This suggested a total path length exceeding 120 km (75 mi), though it is highly probable that this damage path was made up of more than one tornado, possibly as many as four. Overall, the tornado was on the ground for 2 hours and 39 minutes, tracked 75–90 miles (121–145 km), and was 1–1.5 miles (1.6–2.4 km) wide at its peak. Seven people were killed, 117 others were injured, and damages were estimated $17.6 million (1953 USD).

== Non-tornadic events ==
Widespread wind damage occurred throughout an 18 county area in Iowa on May 20. Some of the worst damage occurring near Almoral and Elgin where farmsteads were severely damaged. In Waterloo, a man was crushed to death when a tree fell on him while he was in bed. Other towns in the area reported mostly light damage with uprooted trees and disrupted power and communication lines and light scattered damage was reported elsewhere outside these counties as well. Wind and hail damage was also reported in Southern Wisconsin. Trees were uprooted, disrupting power and communication lines to several large cities, including Milwaukee and Madison. Rural areas were particularly hard-hit as farm buildings were damaged and small barns were destroyed. Hail caused some slight damage to crops throughout the region as well. Storm damage was also reported in Michigan the next day with winds damaged a couple of farm buildings northeast of Bath while a home and it contents along US 27 south of St. Johns were completely destroyed by fire after it was struck by lightning.

== See also ==
- List of tornadoes and tornado outbreaks
  - List of North American tornadoes and tornado outbreaks
