= South Fork Township, Delaware County, Iowa =

South Fork Township
- Township
- Location in Delaware County
- Coordinates: 42°20′19″N 91°11′57″W
- Country: United States
- State: Iowa
- County: Delaware

Area
  - Total: 41.82 sq mi (108.32 km^{2})
  - Land: 41.82 sq mi (108.32 km^{2})
  - Water: 0 sq mi (0 km^{2}) 0%
- Elevation: 928 ft (283 m)

Population (2000)
  - Total: 1,228
  - Density: 29/sq mi (11.3/km^{2})
- GNIS feature ID: 0468728

South Fork Township is a township in Delaware County, Iowa, United States. As of the 2000 census, its population was 1,228.

== Geography ==
South Fork Township covers an area of 41.82 square miles (108.32 square kilometers). The streams of Bell Creek and Sand Creek run through this township.

=== Cities and towns ===
- Hopkinton

=== Unincorporated towns ===
- Sand Springs

(This list is based on USGS data and may include former settlements.)

=== Adjacent townships ===
- North Fork Township (north)
- Dodge Township, Dubuque County (northeast)
- Cascade Township, Dubuque County (east)
- Richland Township, Jones County (southeast)
- Lovell Township, Jones County (south)
- Castle Grove Township, Jones County (southwest)
- Union Township (west)
- Delhi Township (northwest)

=== Cemeteries ===
The township contains five cemeteries: Hopkinton, Livingston, Mount Pleasant, Sand Springs and Willard.
