= Cascade Township, Dubuque County, Iowa =

Cascade Township
- Township
- Location in Dubuque County
- Coordinates: 42°20′32″N 91°04′01″W
- Country: United States
- State: Iowa
- County: Dubuque

Area
  - Total: 35.78 sq mi (92.68 km^{2})
  - Land: 35.78 sq mi (92.68 km^{2})
  - Water: 0 sq mi (0 km^{2}) 0%
- Elevation: 925 ft (282 m)

Population (2000)
  - Total: 1,079
  - Density: 30/sq mi (11.6/km^{2})
- Time zone: UTC-6 (CST)
  - Summer (DST): UTC-5 (CDT)
- ZIP codes: 52033, 52046, 52078, 52237
- GNIS feature ID: 0467536

Cascade Township is one of seventeen townships in Dubuque County, Iowa, United States. As of the 2000 census, its population was 1,079.

== History ==
The name of Cascade Township is derived from the cascade, or water power, with which early settlers powered their mills.

== Geography ==
According to the United States Census Bureau, Cascade Township covers an area of 35.78 square miles (92.68 square kilometers).

=== Cities, towns, villages ===
- Cascade (partial)

=== Adjacent townships ===
- Dodge Township (north)
- Taylor Township (northeast)
- Whitewater Township (east)
- Washington Township, Jones County (southeast)
- Richland Township, Jones County (south)
- Lovell Township, Jones County (southwest)
- South Fork Township, Delaware County (west)
- North Fork Township, Delaware County (northwest)

=== Major highways ===
- U.S. Route 151
- Iowa Highway 136

== School districts ==
- Monticello Community School District
- Western Dubuque Community School District

== Political districts ==
- Iowa's 1st congressional district
- State House District 31
- State Senate District 16
