= Hazel Green Township, Delaware County, Iowa =

Hazel Green Township
- Township
- Location in Delaware County
- Coordinates: 42°20′12″N 91°25′29″W
- Country: United States
- State: Iowa
- County: Delaware

Area
  - Total: 36.04 sq mi (93.34 km^{2})
  - Land: 36.04 sq mi (93.34 km^{2})
  - Water: 0 sq mi (0 km^{2}) 0%
- Elevation: 980 ft (300 m)

Population (2000)
  - Total: 408
  - Density: 11/sq mi (4.4/km^{2})
- GNIS feature ID: 0468024

Hazel Green Township is a township in Delaware County, Iowa, USA. As of the 2000 census, its population was 408.

== History ==
Hazel Green Township was established in 1857.

== Geography ==
Hazel Green Township covers an area of 36.04 square miles (93.34 square kilometers). The stream of Golden Branch runs through this township.

=== Cities and towns ===
- Ryan (east edge)

=== Adjacent townships ===
- Milo Township (north)
- Delhi Township (northeast)
- Union Township (east)
- Castle Grove Township, Jones County (southeast)
- Boulder Township, Linn County (south)
- Jackson Township, Linn County (southwest)
- Adams Township (west)
- Prairie Township (northwest)

=== Cemeteries ===
The township contains three cemeteries: Calvary, Golden Prairie and Peace.
