= Frances Theresa Peet Russell =

American author and professor

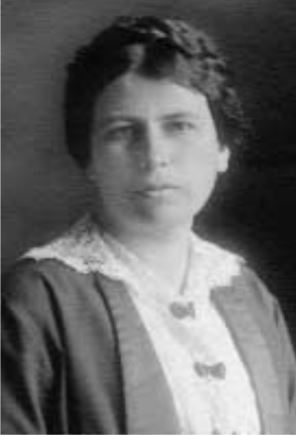
- Born: Frances Theresa Elizabeth Peet; May 18, 1873; Jones County, Iowa
- Died: February 15, 1936 (aged 62)
- Occupations: Author and professor
- Notable work: Satire in the Victorian Novel
- Spouse: Frank B. Russell (m. 1900; died 1903)

Frances Theresa Elizabeth Peet Russell (May 18, 1873 – February 15, 1936) was an American writer and professor. She wrote three books about English literature. Her book Satire in the Victorian Novel may have been the first work to analyze satire in Victorian literature.

== Personal life and career ==
Frances Theresa Elizabeth Peet was born May 18, 1873, in Jones County, Iowa, (Note: Her birth place is variously stated as Anamosa, Iowa, Greenfield Township, and Greenfield Springs, Iowa.) to Emily Jane (née Perkins) and Adelbert Carleton Peet. Often known as Theresa, she was educated in Anamosa, Iowa, and attended the University of Iowa, graduating with a bachelor's degree in 1895. From 1895 to 1900, she was a teacher in Iowa, excluding from 1898 to 1899 when she was at Radcliffe College to complete graduate work.

On June 30, 1900 she married Harvard anthropologist Frank Russell. They moved to Arizona shortly afterwards, and over several years together surveyed for archaeological sites. Frank died in November 1903, and in 1906 Theresa chronicled their travels in a 12-part series in Out West magazine.

She attended Stanford University as an assistant philosophy professor in 1906 and she later attended Columbia University, receiving a Ph.D. in 1920. In 1933, Russell was a poetry judge at a Stanford University competition.

A few years before her death, Russell became a full Professor. She died from cancer on February 15, 1936.

== Works ==
Russell wrote Satire in the Victorian Novel and it was published by Macmillan Publishers in 1920. The book is about satire in English novels that were published in the 1800s. She chronicled thirteen authors in relation to their differences in the use of satire. Russell described satire as "humorous criticism of human foibles and faults, or of life itself, directed especially against deception, and expressed with sufficient art to be accounted as literature". The book goes further by examining irony and sarcasm. The Christian Advocate wrote that satire in Victorian literature was either little written about or not at all until Russell wrote her book. The book The Significance of Anthony Trollope said that Satire in the Victorian Novel is "particularly noteworthy" and mentions page 117 in which Russell states of Anthony Trollope that he is "the real Victorian Shakespeare in the matter of women".

Russell's book about Robert Browning titled One Word More On Browning was published in 1927. She also wrote Touring Utopia which was published by Dial Press in 1932. The book is about utopias in literature. She listed 300 works about utopias and also wrote about actual attempts at creating a utopia.
