= Olin Consolidated Community School District =

School district in Iowa, United States

Coordinates: 41.994107°N 91.139605°W

Location
- Olin, Iowa Jones County United States
- Coordinates: 41.994107, -91.139605

District information
- Type: Local school district
- Grades: PK-6
- Superintendent: Dave Larson
- Schools: 1
- Budget: $3,709,000 (2015-16)
- NCES District ID: 1921720

Students and staff
- Students: 85 (2018-19)
- Teachers: 9.50 FTE
- Staff: 12.63 FTE
- Student–teacher ratio: 8.95
- District mascot: Lions
- Colors: Blue and White

Other information
- Website: www.olin.k12.ia.us

The Olin Consolidated Community School District is a public school district headquartered in Olin, Iowa. The district is completely within Jones County and serves the town of Olin and the surrounding rural areas.

As of 2019, Dave Larson serves as shared superintendent of Olin, Bennett, and Wapsie Valley.

== Schools ==
The district operates a single elementary school in Olin:

- Olin Elementary School

Students from Olin attend secondary school at Anamosa.
