= Union Township, Delaware County, Iowa =

Township in Iowa, USA

Union Township
- Township
- Location in Delaware County
- Coordinates: 42°20′35″N 91°18′55″W
- Country: United States
- State: Iowa
- County: Delaware

Area
  - Total: 29.8 sq mi (77.2 km^{2})
  - Land: 29.80 sq mi (77.19 km^{2})
  - Water: 0.0077 sq mi (0.02 km^{2}) 0.03%
- Elevation: 902 ft (275 m)

Population (2000)
  - Total: 292
  - Density: 9.8/sq mi (3.8/km^{2})
- GNIS feature ID: 0468818

Union Township is a township in Delaware County, Iowa, United States. As of the 2000 census, its population was 292.

== Geography ==
Union Township covers an area of 29.81 square miles (77.2 square kilometers); of this, 0.01 square miles (0.02 square kilometers) or 0.03 percent is water. The streams of Buck Creek, Lime Creek and Plum Creek run through this township.

=== Unincorporated towns ===
- Buck Creek

(This list is based on USGS data and may include former settlements.)

https://pubs.lib.uiowa.edu/annals-of-iowa/article/11033/galley/119590/view/

=== Adjacent townships ===
- Delhi Township (north)
- South Fork Township (east)
- Castle Grove Township, Jones County (south)
- Boulder Township, Linn County (southwest)
- Hazel Green Township (west)
- Milo Township (northwest)

=== Cemeteries ===
The township contains two cemeteries: Buck Creek and Grove Creek.
