= Hale Township =

Hale Township may refer to:

- Hale Township, Garland County, Arkansas, in Garland County, Arkansas
- Hale Township, Warren County, Illinois
- Hale Township, Jones County, Iowa
- Hale Township, McLeod County, Minnesota
- Hale Township, Hardin County, Ohio
