= 1953 Sarnia tornado =

1953 F4 tornado in Michigan, US and Ontario, Canada

Coordinates: 42°58′N 82°24′W

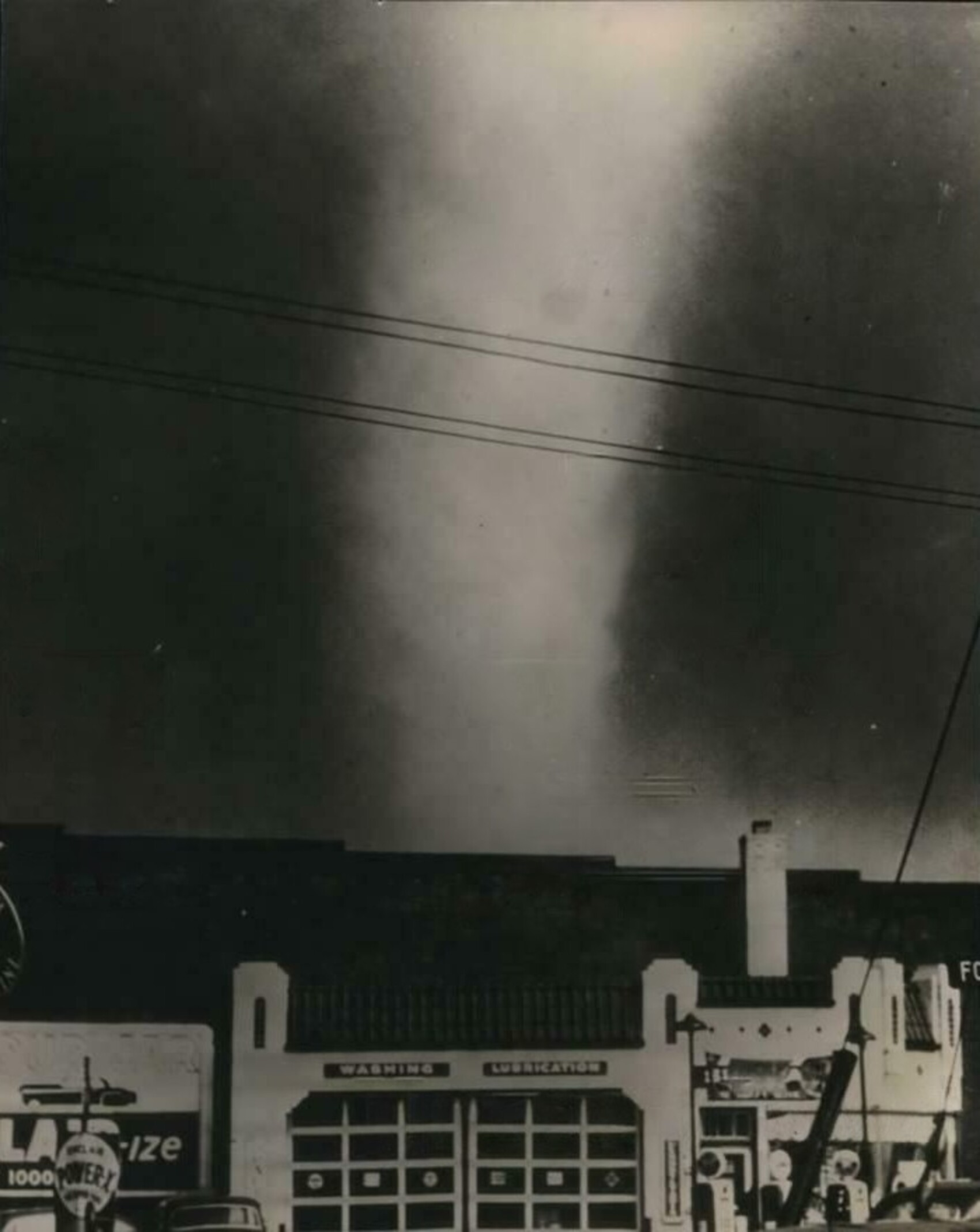
- The tornado as it tracked through Port Huron, Michigan.

Meteorological history
- Formed: May 21, 1953, 4:21 p.m. EDT
- Dissipated: May 21, 1953, 7:00 p.m. EDT
- Duration: 2 hours, 39 minutes

F4 tornado
- on the Fujita scale

Overall effects
- Casualties: 7 fatalities, 117 injuries
- Damage: $17.6 million (1953 USD) $165.6 million (2018 USD)
- Areas affected: Port Huron, Michigan, Sarnia, Ontario, and surrounding area
- Part of the 1953 Sarnia tornado outbreak and tornado outbreaks of 1953

On the afternoon of Thursday, May 21, 1953, a violent F4 tornado struck the cities of Port Huron, Michigan, United States and Sarnia, Ontario, Canada. The long-tracked, over mile-wide tornado destroyed large sections of the downtown areas of both cities, as well scores of neighbourhoods in the surrounding areas and then ending just outside Stratford, Ontario, Canada. Seven people were killed, 117 others were injured, and damages were estimated $17.6 million (1953 USD). The tornado was the last of a two-day severe weather outbreak that also produced two intense tornadoes in Iowa the day before.

== Tornado summary ==
One of many violent tornadoes during this exceedingly active and deadly season, this tornado touched down at 4:21 p.m. near Smiths Creek, Michigan (approximately 10 miles (16 km) southwest of Port Huron). It moved steadily towards the east-northeast at 35 mph (56 km/h) passing through Tappan before devastating the southern edge of Port Huron some 20 minutes later (Grazulis, 1990) resulting in widespread F3 and F4 damage. Two people were killed in Port Huron and 68 more were injured. Close to 400 homes were damaged or destroyed in the United States with monetary losses totalling $2.6 million ($24.4 million 2018 USD)(Grazulis, 1990).

Before crossing the St. Clair River into Canada, the parent thunderstorm dumped heavy amounts of rain and golf-ball-size hail on the city of Sarnia. This circumstance was credited with clearing the streets of motorists and pedestrians, thus reducing the potential number of tornado-related casualties. By 5:45 p.m., however, the over 1 mi (1.6 km) wide tornado roared into Canada just south of Sarnia Harbour (Grazulis, 1990). Moving to the northeast, the tornado passed directly through the downtown area where nearly a hundred commercial buildings sustained damage. A four-floor hotel on the waterfront lost many of its upper floors, as did a furniture store on Christina Street. The auditorium of the Imperial Theatre completely collapsed. Nearby however, a steel-reinforced telephone exchange building received minimal damage, as a result of its sturdy construction.

At least 150 homes on the more suburban outskirts of the city were damaged and, in some instances, reduced to rubble. Before exiting Sarnia, the tornado curved even further to the northeast and began to weaken, as its path narrowed to approximately 30 m (33 yd) across. The nearby radio station CHOK was severely damaged by the tornado as well. As it moved into rural Lambton and Middlesex Counties, more F4 damage was inflicted upon farmsteads and homes near Nairn, before the tornado dissipated south of Stratford around 7 pm EDT (Grazulis, 1990). This suggests a total path length exceeding 120 km (75 mi), though it is highly probable that this damage path was made up of more than one tornado, possibly as many as four. At the very least, there were two other storm tracks that day both of which parallelled the Sarnia storm to its north and south. One of these tracked from Strathroy to northeast of London whereas the other originated near Lambton Shores before weakening near St. Mary's. Significant tornado damage in the F2 to F4 range was also reported with these storms, and it is likely that these parent supercells were also of the cyclic variety. As many as nine individual tornadoes may have touched down during this outbreak. Financial losses in Canada totalled $15 million; five people were killed, 48 were injured, and 500 were left homeless.

Overall, the tornado was on the ground for 2 hours and 39 minutes, tracked 75–90 miles (121–145 km), and was 1–1.5 miles (1.6–2.4 km) wide at its peak. Seven people were killed, 117 others were injured, and damages were estimated $17.6 million (1953 USD).

== Aftermath ==
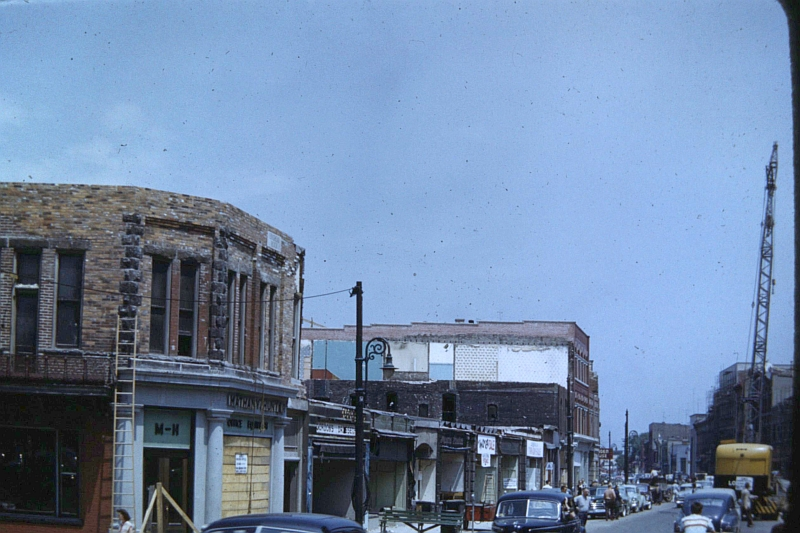
Damage in Sarnia as seen a few days after the tornado

Although CHOK returned to the air within a few hours, it remained under emergency circumstances for several days, and Port Huron's two AM radio stations, WTTH and WHLS, were also off the air and had sustained even more severe damage than CHOK. In the days to come, radio stations in Detroit, Windsor, and London would aid in the relief effort by relaying messages and emergency information from CHOK to listeners around the region. Nevertheless, the work of local radio announcers such as Karl Monk at CHOK and Robin Busse at WTTH, who had kept listeners informed of the storm as it developed until their stations were knocked off the air, was credited for saving many lives.

Both CHOK-AM (1070 kHz) and CHOK-FM (97.5 MHz) were knocked off the air; while the AM station returned to the air later that day, the FM station was never rebuilt and its licence was cancelled in 1957. CHOK would remain an AM-only station until adding an FM rebroadcaster 55 years later.

== See also ==
- List of tornadoes and tornado outbreaks
  - List of North American tornadoes and tornado outbreaks
