= Clay Township, Jones County, Iowa =

Township in Jones County, Iowa, U.S.

Coordinates: 42.1678°N 90.9400°W

Clay Township is a township in Jones County, Iowa, United States.

== History ==
Clay Township was organized in 1844.
