= Madison Township, Jones County, Iowa =

Township in Jones County, Iowa, U.S.

Coordinates: 42.0775°N 91.0731°W

Madison Township is a township in Jones County, Iowa.

== History ==
Madison Township was organized in 1855.
