= North Fork Township, Delaware County, Iowa =

North Fork Township
- Township
- Location in Delaware County
- Coordinates: 42°25′56″N 91°11′30″W
- Country: United States
- State: Iowa
- County: Delaware

Area
  - Total: 36.30 sq mi (94.02 km^{2})
  - Land: 36.3 sq mi (93.9 km^{2})
  - Water: 0.050 sq mi (0.13 km^{2}) 0.14%
- Elevation: 965 ft (294 m)

Population (2000)
  - Total: 512
  - Density: 14/sq mi (5.5/km^{2})
- GNIS feature ID: 0468449

North Fork Township is a township in Delaware County, Iowa, USA. As of the 2000 census, its population was 512.

== Geography ==
North Fork Township covers an area of 36.3 square miles (94.02 square kilometers); of this, 0.05 square miles (0.13 square kilometers) or 0.14 percent is water. The streams of Cooksley Creek, Durion Creek, Penn Creek and Silver Creek run through this township.

=== Unincorporated towns ===
- Gilt Edge

(This list is based on USGS data and may include former settlements.)

=== Extinct towns ===
- Rockville

=== Adjacent townships ===
- Bremen Township (north)
- New Wine Township, Dubuque County (northeast)
- Dodge Township, Dubuque County (east)
- Cascade Township, Dubuque County (southeast)
- South Fork Township (south)
- Delhi Township (west)

=== Cemeteries ===
The township contains one cemetery, Rockville.

=== Major highways ===
- U.S. Route 20
