= Delhi Township, Delaware County, Iowa =

Delhi Township
- Township
- Location in Delaware County
- Coordinates: 42°25′42″N 91°18′26″W
- Country: United States
- State: Iowa
- County: Delaware

Area
  - Total: 35.93 sq mi (93.07 km^{2})
  - Land: 35.66 sq mi (92.35 km^{2})
  - Water: 0.28 sq mi (0.72 km^{2}) 0.77%
- Elevation: 1,007 ft (307 m)

Population (2000)
  - Total: 1,047
  - Density: 29/sq mi (11.3/km^{2})
- GNIS feature ID: 0467701

Delhi Township is a township in Delaware County, Iowa, USA. As of the 2000 census, its population was 1,047.

== Geography ==
Delhi Township covers an area of 35.93 square miles (93.07 square kilometers); of this, 0.28 square miles (0.72 square kilometers) or 0.77 percent is water. The stream of Allison Creek runs through this township.

=== Cities and towns ===
- Delaware (southeast quarter)
- Delhi

=== Adjacent townships ===
- Oneida Township (north)
- Bremen Township (northeast)
- North Fork Township (east)
- South Fork Township (southeast)
- Union Township (south)
- Hazel Green Township (southwest)
- Milo Township (west)

=== Cemeteries ===
The township contains four cemeteries: Allison, Evergreen, Plum Creek and Saint Johns.

=== Major highways ===
- U.S. Route 20
