= Oxford Township, Jones County, Iowa =

Township in Jones County, Iowa, U.S.

Coordinates: 41.9894°N 90.9572°W

Oxford Township is a township in Jones County, Iowa.

== History ==
Oxford Township was organized in 1855.
