= Rome Township, Jones County, Iowa =

Township in Jones County, Iowa, U.S.

Coordinates: 41.9900°N 91.1750°W

Rome Township is a township in Jones County, Iowa, United States.

== History ==
Rome Township was organized in 1842.
