= Fairview, Iowa =

- Unincorporated community
- Location within Iowa Location within the United States
- Coordinates: 42°04′41″N 91°19′48″W
- Country: United States
- State: Iowa
- County: Jones
- Elevation: 974 ft (297 m)
- Time zone: UTC-6 (Central (CST))
  - Summer (DST): UTC-5 (CDT)
- Area code: 319
- GNIS feature ID: 456476

Fairview is an unincorporated community in Jones County, Iowa, United States. Fairview is north of the junction of U.S. Route 151 and Iowa Highway 1 and is southwest of Anamosa.

== History ==
The village of Fairview was laid out in 1841. Fairview's population was 26 in 1902.

== Education ==
Anamosa Community School District operates local area public schools.

== Notable people ==
- Jennie Iowa Berry (1866-1951), National President, Woman's Relief Corps
