= Jackson Township, Jones County, Iowa =

Township in Jones County, Iowa, U.S.

Coordinates: 42.0776°N 91.1901°W

Jackson Township is a township in Jones County, Iowa.

== History ==
Jackson Township was organized in 1851.
