= Wayne Township, Jones County, Iowa =

Township in Jones County, Iowa, U.S.

Coordinates: 42.1650°N 91.1894°W

Wayne Township is a township in Jones County, Iowa.

== History ==
Wayne Township was organized in 1856.
