= Scotch Grove Township, Jones County, Iowa =

Township in Jones County, Iowa, U.S.

Coordinates: 42.1647°N 91.0728°W

Scotch Grove Township is a township in Jones County, Iowa.

== History ==
Scotch Grove Township was organized in 1855. The current population is 446.
