= Monticello Township, Jones County, Iowa =

Home@home

Coordinates: 42°14′N 91°11′W

Monticello Township is a township in Jones County, Iowa. The township was organized in 1847.
