= Fairview Township, Jones County, Iowa =

Township in Jones County, Iowa, U.S.

Coordinates: 42.0764°N 91.3164°W

Fairview Township is a township in Jones County, Iowa, United States.

== History ==
Fairview Township was organized in 1842.

The county seat, the city of Anamosa, was established within the township.
