= Wild Faith =

Book written by Tal Lavin

Wild Faith: How the Christian Right Is Taking Over America
- Author: Tal Lavin
- Genre: Non-fiction
- Publisher: Legacy Lit
- Publication date: 2024
- Pages: 304

Wild Faith: How the Christian Right is Taking Over America is a book written by Tal Lavin.

== Background ==
Wild Faith is a book written by Tal Lavin and published by Hachette Book Group imprint Legacy Lit on October 15, 2024. Lavin spent three years working on the book. Lavin's previous book, Culture Warlords, focused on online extremist groups, and he decided to focus on right-wing Christianity because he felt that many of the ideas espoused in those extremist spaces online have since migrated to the mainstream right-wing. The second half of the book focuses on responses he received from questions he posted online.

Lavin argues that Evangelicals' beliefs have been dismissed as a tiny minority when in fact they are a large movement. For instance, 10 million people in the United States believe spiritual warfare is needed to bring about God's kingdom. Lavin notes that the patriarchal beliefs of Evangelicals lead to submission to authority figures such as pastors and political leaders. Lavin notes that many of these political projects originated in homes with strict parenting and homeschooling. The book covers abuses of power in Evangelical communities and covers reports of child abuse.

== Reception ==
In the Topanga New Times, Jimmy P. Morgan compared the book to The Founding Myth and Jesus and John Wayne. Eric Liebetrau wrote in The Boston Globe that the book's narrative flow is negatively impacted by the number of offenses he tries to cover; however, he also notes that the book is well-researched. In The Conversation, Russell Blackford criticised the book for its proposed solution and its lack of engagement with and refutation of religious beliefs.
