= Dodge Township, Dubuque County, Iowa =

Dodge Township
- Township
- Location in Dubuque County
- Coordinates: 42°25′28″N 91°05′06″W
- Country: United States
- State: Iowa
- County: Dubuque

Area
  - Total: 36.59 sq mi (94.78 km^{2})
  - Land: 36.6 sq mi (94.7 km^{2})
  - Water: 0.031 sq mi (0.08 km^{2}) 0.08%
- Elevation: 1,001 ft (305 m)

Population (2000)
  - Total: 1,204
  - Density: 33/sq mi (12.7/km^{2})
- Time zone: UTC-6 (CST)
  - Summer (DST): UTC-5 (CDT)
- ZIP codes: 52040, 52046, 52078
- GNIS feature ID: 0467717

Dodge Township is one of seventeen townships in Dubuque County, Iowa, United States. As of the 2000 census, its population was 1,204.

== Geography ==
According to the United States Census Bureau, Dodge Township covers an area of 36.6 square miles (94.78 square kilometers); of this, 36.57 square miles (94.7 square kilometers, 99.92 percent) is land and 0.03 square miles (0.08 square kilometers, 0.08 percent) is water.

=== Cities, towns, villages ===
- Dyersville (partial)
- Farley (partial)
- Worthington

=== Adjacent townships ===
- New Wine Township (north)
- Iowa Township (northeast)
- Taylor Township (east)
- Whitewater Township (southeast)
- Cascade Township (south)
- South Fork Township, Delaware County (southwest)
- North Fork Township, Delaware County (west)

=== Cemeteries ===
The township contains three cemeteries: Fairview, Saint Pauls and Worthington Baptist (historical).

=== Major highways ===
- U.S. Route 20
- Iowa Highway 136

== School districts ==
- Western Dubuque Community School District

== Political districts ==
- Iowa's 1st congressional district
- State House District 31
- State House District 32
- State Senate District 16
