= Milo Township, Delaware County, Iowa =

Milo Township
- Township
- Location in Delaware County
- Coordinates: 42°25′26″N 91°25′33″W
- Country: United States
- State: Iowa
- County: Delaware

Area
  - Total: 35.49 sq mi (91.91 km^{2})
  - Land: 35.03 sq mi (90.72 km^{2})
  - Water: 0.46 sq mi (1.19 km^{2}) 1.29%
- Elevation: 950 ft (290 m)

Population (2000)
  - Total: 1,233
  - Density: 35/sq mi (13.6/km^{2})
- GNIS feature ID: 0468385

Milo Township is a township in Delaware County, Iowa, United States. As of the 2000 census, its population was 1,233.

== Geography ==
Milo Township covers an area of 35.49 square miles (91.91 square kilometers); of this, 0.46 square miles (1.19 square kilometers) or 1.29 percent is water. The streams of Sand Creek, Spring Branch, Todds Creek and Turtle Creek run through this township.

=== Cities and towns ===
- Manchester (south edge)

=== Unincorporated towns ===
- Golden

(This list is based on USGS data and may include former settlements.)

=== Adjacent townships ===
- Delaware Township (north)
- Oneida Township (northeast)
- Delhi Township (east)
- Union Township (southeast)
- Hazel Green Township (south)
- Adams Township (southwest)
- Prairie Township (west)

=== Cemeteries ===
The township contains six cemeteries: Baileys Ford, Hamblin, Lillibridge, Milo Township, Sands Farm and Spring Branch.

=== Major highways ===
- U.S. Route 20
