= Jennie Iowa Berry =

American clubwoman

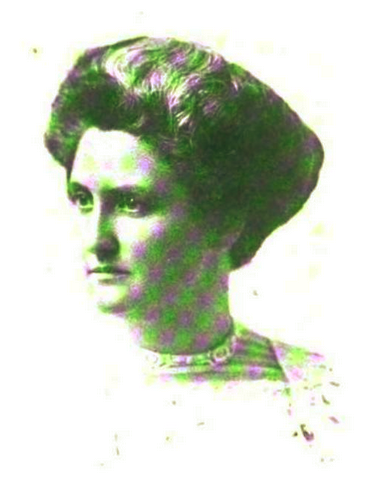
- Jennie I. Berry (1910)
- Born: Jennie Iowa Peet; February 5, 1866; Fairview, Iowa, U.S.
- Died: December 18, 1951 (aged 85); Los Angeles, California, U.S.
- Occupation: Clubwoman
- Known for: National President, Woman's Relief Corps
- Spouse: John Alexander Berry (m. 1887)

Jennie Iowa Berry (née Peet; also known as Mrs. John Alexander Berry; February 5, 1866 - December 18, 1951) was an American charitable organization leader and clubwoman. She served as the 27th National President of the Woman's Relief Corps (WRC).

== Early life and education ==
Jennie Iowa Peet was born in Fairview, Iowa, February 5, 1866. Her parents were Wilbur Riley and Sarah Ellen Gillilan Peet, both of Revolutionary descent. Her mother was a native of West Virginia and her father was born in Iowa Territory.

She was educated in the public schools and in the Epworth Seminary in Iowa.

== Career ==
For seven years after graduating, she taught in the public schools.

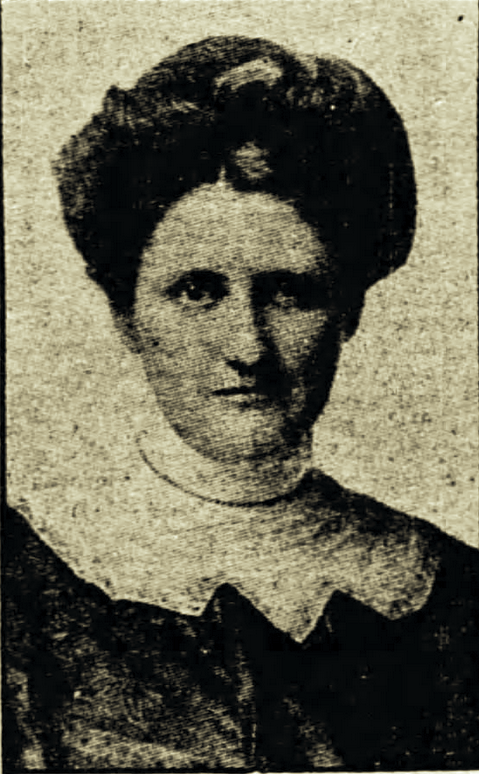
(1909)

Berry was one of the leading patriotic women of Iowa. She held almost every local office and state office in the WRC. She served this organization as the National President in 1909–1910, with a membership of 167,000. Later, she became a member of the committee on revision of national law and was president of "The Past Department President's Association."

She was a charter member of the Daughters of the American Revolution, and served as regent of Ashley Chapter. She was for three years president of the Cedar Rapids Woman's Club and was chair of several of its departments. She served the Iowa Federation of Women's Clubs as corresponding secretary and as chair of several state committees. Berry was a member of the local Library Art Association, and the local YWCA

She was a prominent factor in securing the passage of a law for the appointment of a woman factory inspector to better labor conditions. She contributed many articles to patriotic publications and promoted patriotic education in Iowa.

== Personal life ==
On July 7, 1887, at Troy Mills, Iowa, she married John Alexander Berry.

In religion, Berry was a Presbyterian; she was also a member of the Home Missionary and the Chapel Society connected with it. In politics, she was a Republican. Berry favored woman suffrage.

Jennie Iowa Berry died in Los Angeles, California on December 18, 1951.
