= Frank Russell (anthropologist) =

American anthropologist and ethnologist

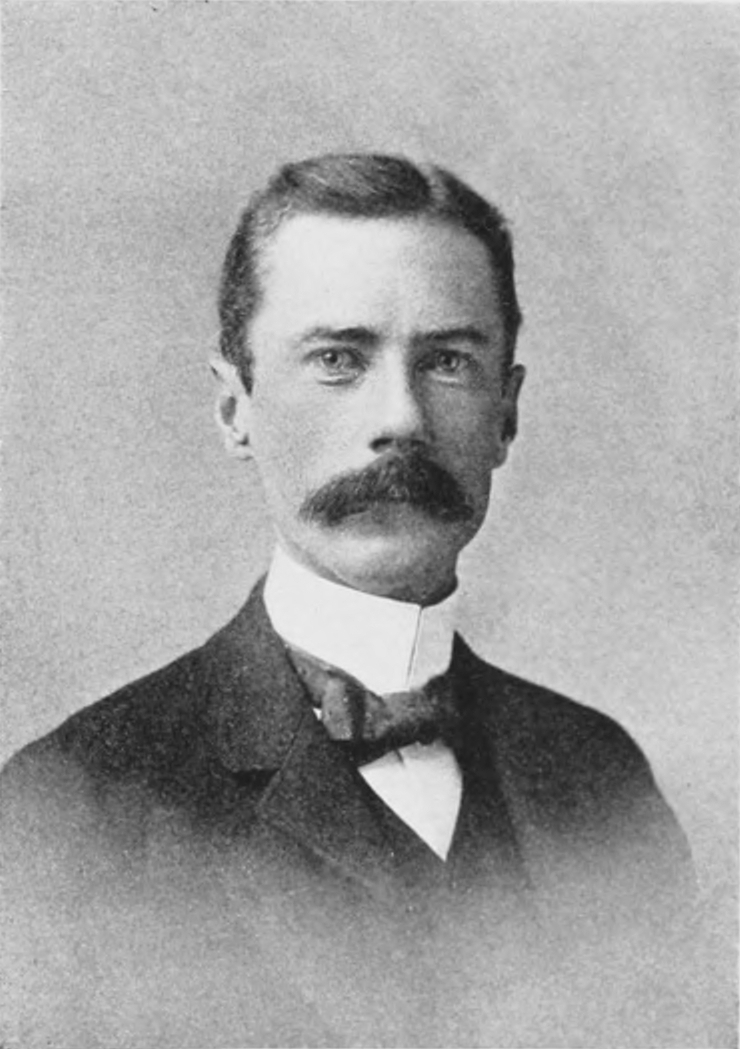
Frank Russell, 1868–1903

Frank B. Russell (August 26, 1868 – November 7, 1903) was an American anthropologist and ethnologist. Russell was Born in Fort Dodge, Iowa, to Elizabeth Carleton and David Chandler Russell. He attended the University of Iowa, receiving the degree of Bachelor of Science in 1892 and Master of Science in 1895. He then attended Harvard University, where he received a Bachelor of Arts in 1896, Master of Arts in 1897 and Doctor of Philosophy in 1898. Previous to this collegiate course, he had spent two and a half years as an explorer alone in the far north of Canada and one year as a portrait painter. His first position as a teacher was that of assistant in zoology at the University of Iowa in 1892. At Harvard, he taught as an assistant in anthropology from 1896 to 1897, and in 1897 was made instructor in anthropology. He became associate editor of The American Naturalist in 1897 and a member of its editorial board in 1899.

During the years 1901–1902, he was connected with the Bureau of American Ethnology. He served as president of the American Folklore Society in 1901 and a vice-president of the American Association for the Advancement of Science.

On June 30, 1900, he was married to educator Theresa Peet. They moved to Arizona shortly afterwards and over several years together surveyed for archaeological sites.

He died from tuberculosis in Kingman, Arizona, November 7, 1903. At his death he was a Councilor of the American Anthropological Association.

His monograph on the native tribes of southern Arizona was posthumously published in 1908.
