= Langworthy, Iowa =

- Unincorporated community
- Location within Iowa Location within the United States
- Coordinates: 42°11′28″N 91°13′27″W
- Country: United States
- State: Iowa
- County: Jones
- Elevation: 860 ft (260 m)
- Time zone: UTC-6 (Central (CST))
  - Summer (DST): UTC-5 (CDT)
- GNIS feature ID: 458223

Langworthy is an unincorporated community in north-central Jones County, Iowa, United States. It lies along U.S. Route 151 north of the city of Anamosa, the county seat of Jones County. Its elevation is 860 feet (262 m).

== History ==
Langworthy was platted in 1858 by Col. W. T. Shaw.

Langworthy's post office was established on 25 January 1875 and discontinued on 18 January 1974, at which time it was attached to the Monticello post office. Although its post office is gone, Langworthy retains its own ZIP Code, 52252.

Langworthy's population in 1915 was 26. The population was 100 in 1940.
