= Wyoming Township, Jones County, Iowa =

Township in Jones County, Iowa, U.S.

Coordinates: 42.0844°N 90.9478°W

Wyoming Township is a township in Jones County, Iowa.

== History ==
Wyoming Township was organized in 1854; it was originally called Pierce Township.
