= Anamosa Community School District =

Public school district in Anamosa, Iowa, United States

Coordinates: 42.105952°N 91.287429°W

Location
- Anamosa, Iowa Jones and Linn counties United States
- Coordinates: 42.105952, -91.287429

District information
- Type: Local school district
- Grades: K–12
- Superintendent: Darren Hanna
- Schools: 3
- Budget: $20,719,000 (2020-21)
- NCES District ID: 1903570

Students and staff
- Students: 1193 (2022-23)
- Teachers: 89.01 FTE
- Staff: 92.02 FTE
- Student–teacher ratio: 13.40
- Athletic conference: River Valley Conference
- District mascot: Raiders
- Colors: Royal and White

Other information
- Website: www.anamosa.k12.ia.us

The Anamosa Community School District (ACSD) is a rural public school district headquartered in Anamosa, Iowa.

It encompasses part of Jones County and a small portion of eastern Linn County. The cities of Anamosa, Martelle and Morley are in the school district, along with the unincorporated communities of Amber, Fairview and Viola. The Anamosa school district currently has three schools. Strawberry Hill Elementary, Anamosa Middle School and Anamosa High School. Their sports teams are called Blue Raiders.

== List of schools ==
- Strawberry Hill Elementary, Anamosa
- Anamosa Middle School, Anamosa
- Anamosa High School, Anamosa

== History ==
When the district was organized into its current form, ACSD had schools in two elementary schools in Anamosa and one each in Martelle, Morley and Viola, along with the middle school and high school in Anamosa. Morley closed in the 1960s followed by West Elementary in Anamosa (For many years called Anamosa Elementary) in 1982. Martelle closed in 1990 and reorganization took place with K-2 attending Strawberry Hill in Anamosa 3–4 at Viola, and 5–8 at the Middle School. Viola closed in 1998 moving K-4 back to Strawberry Hill along with 5th graders who moved over from the Middle School.

== The District's Future ==
With West Middle School nearing 100 years old, a new middle school was built in 2012 on Old Dubuque road in Anamosa thus closing the West Middle School and beginning the start of Anamosa Middle School. The Ellen Kennedy Performing Arts Center opened spring of 2016.

== Anamosa High School ==
=== Athletics ===
Since 2017, the Raiders compete in the River Valley Conference, after leaving the WaMaC Conference. The Raiders compete in the following sports:

- Baseball
- Bowling
- Basketball (boys and girls)
- Cross Country (boys and girls)
- Football
- Golf (boys and girls)
  - Boys' - 1999 Class 2A State Champions
- Soccer (boys and girls)
- Softball
- Swimming (boys and girls)
- Tennis (boys and girls)
- Track and Field (boys and girls)
  - Boys' - 3-time State Champions (1956, 1974, 1975)
- Volleyball
- Wrestling

== See also ==
- List of school districts in Iowa
- List of high schools in Iowa
