= Golden, Iowa =

Unincorporated community in Iowa, US

- Unincorporated community
- Location within Iowa
- Coordinates: 42°23′26″N 91°28′14″W
- Country: United States
- State: Iowa
- County: Delaware
- Elevation: 1,050 ft (320 m)
- Time zone: UTC-6 (Central (CST))
  - Summer (DST): UTC-5 (CDT)
- Area code: 563
- GNIS feature ID: 464160

Golden is an unincorporated community in Milo Township, Delaware County, Iowa, United States.

== Geography ==
The community lies at the junction of Iowa Highway 13 and County Road D42, three miles north of Ryan and 6.5 miles southwest of Manchester, where 275th Street crosses the Canadian National Railway line.

Golden is in section 31 of Milo Township.

== History ==
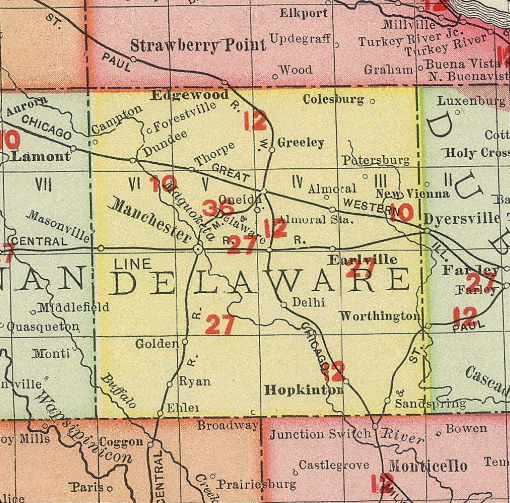
Golden in southwestern Delaware County, Iowa, in 1903

Golden was founded as a rail stop on the Illinois Central Railroad.

The community was founded in Section 31 of Milo Township. Originally called Golden Prairie, a post office opened on March 7, 1870, and changed to the name Golden in 1883. Eugene W. Hawley was the first postmaster.

In 1887, the community's population was 60. The Golden post office closed in 1903, with the introduction of Rural Free Delivery.

By 1914, the community consisted of just a few houses and a general store.

The Golden Congregational Church, southeast of Golden, was founded in October 1927; in 1936, it had 125 members. This church still operates, and observed its 150th anniversary in August 2019.

Golden's population was estimated as 100 in 1940.

== See also ==
- Hartwick, Iowa
