= Jones County Courthouse (Iowa) =

- Jones County Court House
- U.S. National Register of Historic Places
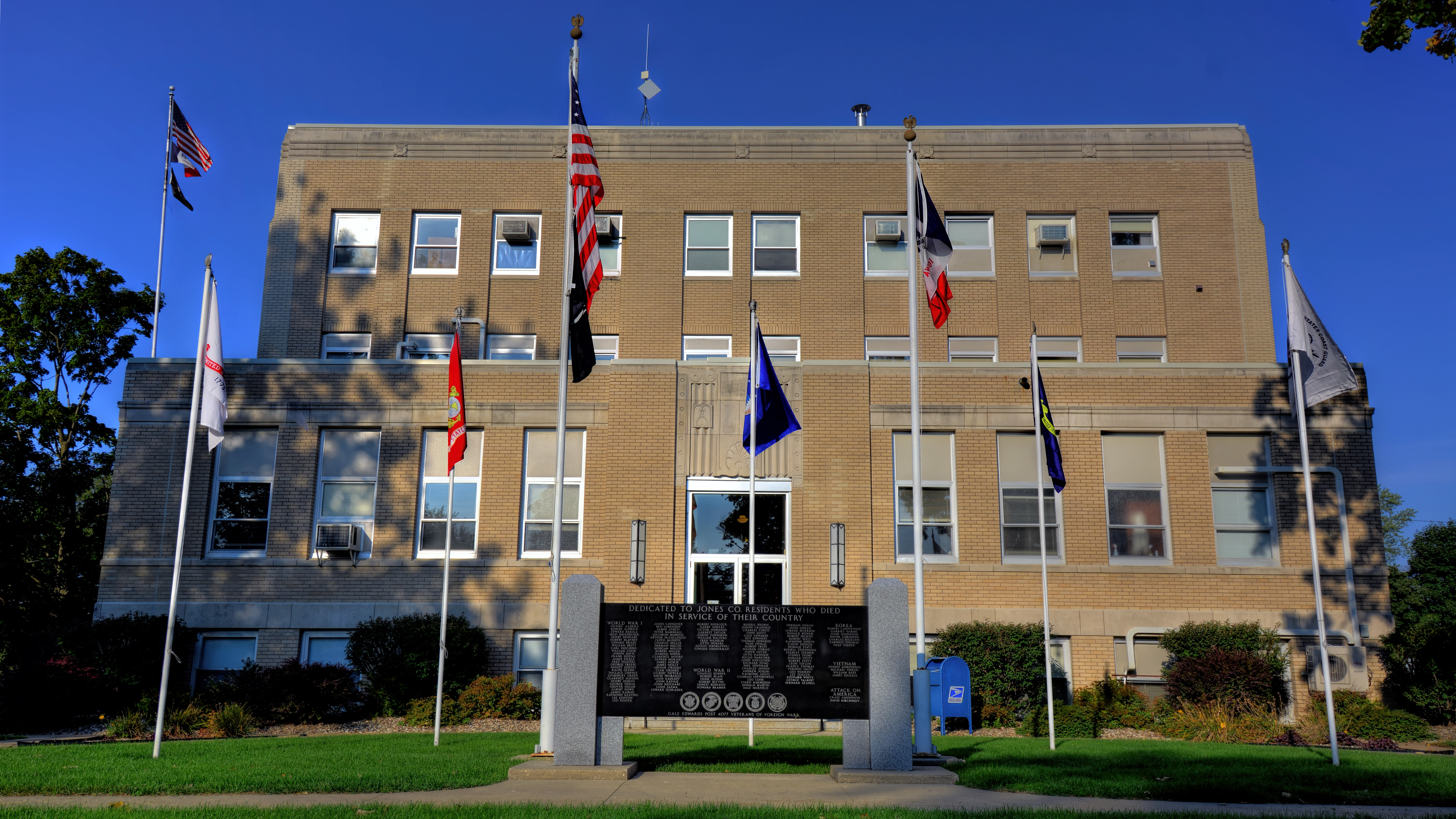

- Location within Iowa Location within the United States
- Location: 500 W. Main St. Anamosa, Iowa
- Coordinates: 42°6′34″N 91°17′24″W
- Area: less than 10 acres (4.0 ha)
- Built: 1937
- Architect: Dougher, Rich and Woodburn
- Architectural style: PWA Moderne
- MPS: PWA-Era County Courthouses of IA MPS
- NRHP reference No.: 03000822
- Added to NRHP: August 28, 2003

The Jones County Courthouse in Anamosa, Iowa, United States was built in 1937. It was listed on the National Register of Historic Places in 2003 as the "Jones County Court House." It is a part of the PWA-Era County Courthouses of IA Multiple Properties Submission, and is the third building the county has used for court functions and county administration.

== History ==
The first Jones County Courthouse was built in 1847 for $800. The building measured 30 by 40 feet (9.1 by 12.2 m), and was occupied on January 3, 1848. The county declared the building unsafe and vacated it in 1864. It was destroyed by fire in 1875. The county rented space until the city of Anamosa appropriated $6,000 to buy the second floor of the Shaw Block to insure the county seat would not move to Center Junction. A plan to build a courthouse in 1920 failed. There was, however, a lack of pride in the county facilities that were declining in condition that threatened the security of county records.

The county board of supervisors applied to the Public Works Administration, or PWA, for a grant to build a new courthouse and a referendum was approved by 77 percent of voters on September 10, 1935. Des Moines architects Dougher, Rich & Woodburn designed the new building. Excavation for the courthouse was begun once the PWA approved the grant. The cornerstone was laid on August 9, 1936. C.C. Larsen & Sons Co. of Council Bluffs won the contract to build the building. Completion was delayed because of contract delays and cost overruns. The building's final construction costs were $200,000. County offices moved into the building in August and the dedication was held on September 10, 1937. Nearly 6,000 people attended the ceremonies. Governor Nelson G. Kraschel delivered the main address. Other speakers included State PWA Director P.P. Hopkins and Justice J.M. Parsons of the Iowa Supreme Court, who was a Jones County native.

== Architecture ==
The architectural style of the building is known as Depression Modern or PWA Moderne. The building features a symmetrical façade with a central section that is flanked by two lower sections. The exterior is composed of buff-colored brick and Bedford limestone trim. It is three stories tall and built on a raised basement. On the interior, the central corridors extend the length of the building, with the county offices opening onto the corridors. The building features multi-colored terrazzo floors, marble wainscoting, and acoustic tiles. The courtroom was originally decorated in dark wood tones and Art Deco ornamentation.

The courthouse is located on a large rectangular plot of land overlooking the Anamosa State Penitentiary on the west side of town. The land had previously been a city park and is a contributing site on the courthouse's nomination to the National Register of Historic Places. The original flagpole in front of the building is a contributing object. The two veterans monuments on the property, one from the 1970s or 1980s, and one from 2002 are non-contributing objects.
