= Tal Lavin =

American journalist and author

Tal Lavin (formerly Talia Lavin; born 1989) is an American journalist. He is the author of Culture Warlords: My Journey into the Dark Web of White Supremacy, published in 2020, and Wild Faith: How the Christian Right Is Taking Over America, published in 2024.

== Life ==
Lavin grew up in Teaneck, New Jersey in a Jewish family and was raised Modern Orthodox. He attended SAR High School and graduated from Harvard University in 2012 with a degree in comparative literature. He was a Fulbright scholar and spent a year in Ukraine from 2012 to 2013. In 2025 Lavin came out as a trans man.

== Career ==
Lavin worked as a fact-checker at The New Yorker. In 2018, he was hired as researcher on far-right extremism by Media Matters for America.

Until January 2019 Lavin wrote a weekly political column in HuffPost, and he also worked as a columnist for MSNBC Daily. His work appeared in the Washington Post as well.

== Bibliography ==
=== Books ===
- Culture Warlords: My Journey into the Dark Web of White Supremacy. Hachette Books. 2020. ISBN 9780306846434
- Wild Faith: How the Christian Right Is Taking Over America. Legacy Lit. 2024. ISBN 9780306829192

=== Essays and reporting ===
- "[Untitled review of The Binc bar]". Goings on About Town. Bar Tab. The New Yorker. 93 (10): 33. April 24, 2017.

=== Critical studies and reviews of Lavin's work ===
Culture warlords

- Szalai, Jennifer (2020-10-14). "An Undercover Trip Into the Rageful Worlds of Incels and White Supremacists". The New York Times. ISSN 0362-4331.
- Kellogg, Carolyn (2020-10-27). "An Expedition Deep Into an Underworld of Online Hate". The New York Times. ISSN 0362-4331.
- "'My goal was to destroy him' – Jewish journalist Talia Lavin on infiltrating white supremacist groups online". independent. 4 July 2021.
- "White Supremacy And Its Online Reach : It's Been a Minute". NPR.org.
- "Culture Warlords: My Journey Into the Dark Web of White Supremacy | Jewish Book Council". www.jewishbookcouncil.org. 2020.
- Venkataramakrishnan, Siddarth (8 February 2021). "'Culture Warlords' — undercover among neo-Nazis". Financial Times.
- Tuttle, Kate (October 22, 2020). "A writer infiltrates the world of white nationalism in 'Culture Warlords' - The Boston Globe". BostonGlobe.com.
