= Hale Township, Jones County, Iowa =

Township in Jones County, Iowa, U.S.

Coordinates: 41.9853°N 91.0811°W

Hale Township is a township in Jones County, Iowa.

== History ==
Hale Township was organized in 1851. It was named for Hon. J. P. Hale.
