= Morley, Iowa =

- City
- Location of Morley, Iowa
- Coordinates: 42°0′24″N 91°14′48″W
- Country: United States
- State: Iowa
- County: Jones

Area
  - Total: 0.085 sq mi (0.22 km^{2})
  - Land: 0.085 sq mi (0.22 km^{2})
  - Water: 0 sq mi (0.00 km^{2})
- Elevation: 797 ft (243 m)

Population (2020)
  - Total: 96
  - Density: 1,121.2/sq mi (432.89/km^{2})
- Time zone: UTC-6 (Central (CST))
  - Summer (DST): UTC-5 (CDT)
- ZIP code: 52312
- Area code: 319
- FIPS code: 19-54030
- GNIS feature ID: 0459231

Morley is a city in Jones County, Iowa, United States. The population was 96 at the time of the 2020 census. It is part of the Cedar Rapids Metropolitan Statistical Area.

== History ==
Morley was laid out circa 1873 on the main line of the Chicago, Milwaukee, St. Paul and Pacific Railroad. First called Viroqua, it was renamed Morley in 1886.

== Geography ==
Morley is located at 42°0′24″N 91°14′48″W (42.006556, -91.246719).

According to the United States Census Bureau, the city has a total area of 0.09 square miles (0.23 km^{2}), all land.

== Demographics ==
Historical populations
Year	Pop.	±%
1930	117	—
1940	119	+1.7%
1950	157	+31.9%
1960	124	−21.0%
1970	123	−0.8%
1980	94	−23.6%
1990	85	−9.6%
2000	88	+3.5%
2010	115	+30.7%
2020	96	−16.5%
Source:"U.S. Census website". United States Census Bureau. and Iowa Data Center; Source: U.S. Decennial Census

=== 2020 census ===
As of the census of 2020, there were 96 people, 40 households, and 27 families residing in the city. The population density was 1,121.2 inhabitants per square mile (432.9/km^{2}). There were 47 housing units at an average density of 548.9 per square mile (211.9/km^{2}). The racial makeup of the city was 90.6% White, 1.0% Black or African American, 0.0% Native American, 0.0% Asian, 0.0% Pacific Islander, 0.0% from other races and 8.3% from two or more races. Hispanic or Latino persons of any race comprised 2.1% of the population.

Of the 40 households, 30.0% of which had children under the age of 18 living with them, 25.0% were married couples living together, 15.0% were cohabitating couples, 37.5% had a female householder with no spouse or partner present and 22.5% had a male householder with no spouse or partner present. 32.5% of all households were non-families. 27.5% of all households were made up of individuals, 7.5% had someone living alone who was 65 years old or older.

The median age in the city was 32.0 years. 30.2% of the residents were under the age of 20; 10.4% were between the ages of 20 and 24; 25.0% were from 25 and 44; 22.9% were from 45 and 64; and 11.5% were 65 years of age or older. The gender makeup of the city was 45.8% male and 54.2% female.

=== 2010 census ===
As of the census of 2010, there were 115 people, 44 households, and 30 families living in the city. The population density was 1,277.8 inhabitants per square mile (493.4/km^{2}). There were 51 housing units at an average density of 566.7 per square mile (218.8/km^{2}). The racial makeup of the city was 99.1% White and 0.9% from two or more races. Hispanic or Latino of any race were 0.9% of the population.

There were 44 households, of which 38.6% had children under the age of 18 living with them, 36.4% were married couples living together, 15.9% had a female householder with no husband present, 15.9% had a male householder with no wife present, and 31.8% were non-families. 25.0% of all households were made up of individuals, and 15.9% had someone living alone who was 65 years of age or older. The average household size was 2.61 and the average family size was 2.93.

The median age in the city was 40.5 years. 30.4% of residents were under the age of 18; 8.7% were between the ages of 18 and 24; 17.4% were from 25 to 44; 27.9% were from 45 to 64; and 15.7% were 65 years of age or older. The gender makeup of the city was 53.9% male and 46.1% female.

=== 2000 census ===
At the 2000 census, there were 88 people, 43 households and 19 families living in the city. The population density was 882.1 inhabitants per square mile (340.6/km^{2}). There were 47 housing units at an average density of 471.1 per square mile (181.9/km^{2}). The racial makeup of the city was 98.86% White, and 1.14% from two or more races.

There were 43 households, of which 27.9% had children under the age of 18 living with them, 32.6% were married couples living together, 4.7% had a female householder with no husband present, and 55.8% were non-families. 46.5% of all households were made up of individuals, and 23.3% had someone living alone who was 65 years of age or older. The average household size was 2.05 and the average family size was 3.05.

25.0% of the population were under the age of 18, 3.4% from 18 to 24, 35.2% from 25 to 44, 15.9% from 45 to 64, and 20.5% who were 65 years of age or older. The median age was 38 years. For every 100 females, there were 125.6 males. For every 100 females age 18 and over, there were 135.7 males.

The median household income was $44,375 and the median family income was $52,500. Males had a median income of $36,250 versus $19,063 for females. The per capita income for the city was $22,167. There were no families and 4.9% of the population living below the poverty line, including no under eighteens and 18.2% of those over 64.

== Education ==
Anamosa Community School District operates schools serving this community.
