= Culture Warlords =

Non-fiction book by Tal Lavin

- Author: Tal Lavin
- Language: English
- Subject: White supremacy
- Genre: Non-fiction
- Published: 2020, Hachette Books
- Media type: Print, e-book, audiobook
- Pages: 288 pages
- ISBN: 978-0-30684-643-4
- Website: hachettebooks.com/titles/talia-lavin/culture-warlords/9780306846434/

Culture Warlords: My Journey into the Dark Web of White Supremacy is a non-fiction book by Tal Lavin. In the book, Lavin describes a project of inventing online personae that allow him to meet and expose fascist white supremacists who gather in online chatrooms and websites; the book also traces the historic roots of these contemporary phenomena.

Time named Culture Warlords one of the 100 must-read books of 2020.

== Publication history ==
Lavin, who is Jewish and the grandchild of Holocaust survivors, became motivated to investigate the topic following white supremacist rallies in Charlottesville, Virginia in 2017, where "Jews will not replace us!" was a rallying cry. This may be in reference to the white genocide conspiracy theory.

In March 2019, Lavin sold Culture Warlords to editor Paul Whitlatch at Hachette Books. It was published on October 13, 2020.

== Content ==
Lavin invented online personae, which allowed him to gain entry to white supremacist websites and chatrooms, gathering information for journalists and anti-fascist activists. The book describes these present-day encounters while also tracing "the distant and near history of the alt-right, from the medieval European blood libel to Henry Ford's mainstreaming of anti-Semitic ideas to Gamergate and the stories of a radicalized adolescent YouTuber."

== Reception ==
Publishers Weekly called the book a "bracing and wide-ranging look at the internet as a breeding ground for racism and misogyny. Readers with a strong stomach for hateful ideology will find plenty of harrowing takeaways." Kirkus gave Culture Warlords a starred review and USA Today named it number one in the "hottest new book releases" for the week it was published.

Writing in The New York Times, Jennifer Szalai said, "One of the marvels of this furious book is how insolent and funny Lavin is." In her review for the Boston Globe, Kate Tuttle notes that while other books treat similar material, Lavin's work "feels particularly insightful, perhaps because [he] understands so deeply both the modern idiom in which these bigots operate today and their historic roots in race science, eugenics, and anti-Semitism."

Time named Culture Warlords one of the 100 must-read books of 2020.
