= Olin, Iowa =

- City
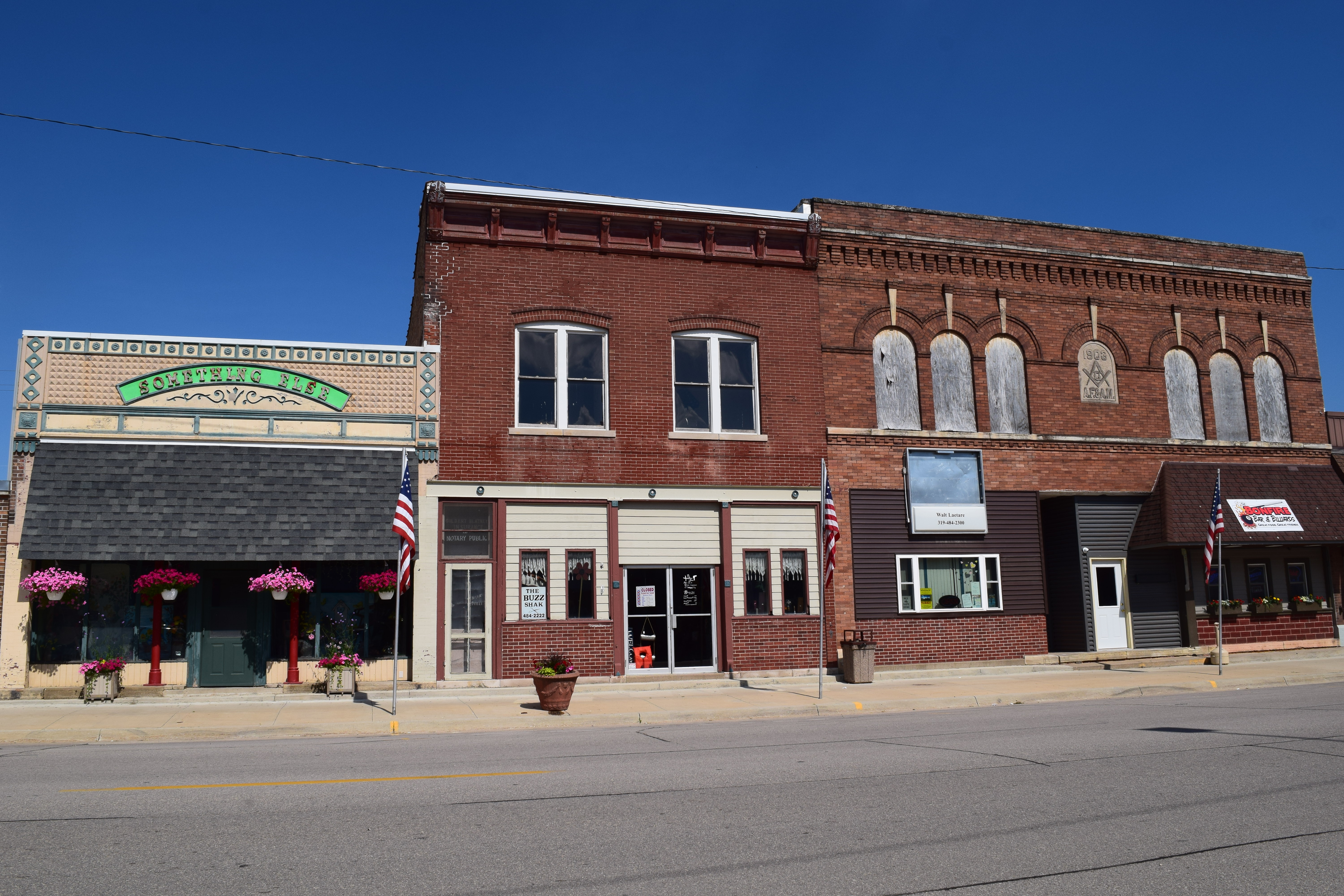
- Downtown Olin

- Location of Olin, Iowa
- Coordinates: 41°59′51″N 91°8′24″W
- Country: United States
- State: Iowa
- County: Jones
- Incorporated: November 14, 1879

Area
  - Total: 1.03 sq mi (2.67 km^{2})
  - Land: 1.02 sq mi (2.65 km^{2})
  - Water: 0.0077 sq mi (0.02 km^{2})
- Elevation: 761 ft (232 m)

Population (2020)
  - Total: 651
  - Density: 637.0/sq mi (245.96/km^{2})
- Time zone: UTC-6 (Central (CST))
  - Summer (DST): UTC-5 (CDT)
- ZIP code: 52320
- Area code: 319
- FIPS code: 19-58980
- GNIS feature ID: 0459851
- Website: www.cityofolin.com

Olin is a city in Jones County, Iowa, United States. The population was 651 at the time of the 2020 census. It is part of the Cedar Rapids Metropolitan Statistical Area.

== History ==
Olin is named for D. A. Olin, general superintendent of the Chicago, Milwaukee, St. Paul and Pacific Railroad.

== Geography ==
Olin is located at 41°59′51″N 91°8′24″W (41.997599, -91.139924).

According to the United States Census Bureau, the city has a total area of 1.04 square miles (2.69 km^{2}), of which 1.03 square miles (2.67 km^{2}) is land and 0.01 square miles (0.03 km^{2}) is water.

== Demographics ==
Historical populations
| Year | Pop. | ±% |
|---|---|---|
| 1880 | 362 | — |
| 1890 | 519 | +43.4% |
| 1900 | 692 | +33.3% |
| 1910 | 659 | −4.8% |
| 1920 | 718 | +9.0% |
| 1930 | 632 | −12.0% |
| 1940 | 707 | +11.9% |
| 1950 | 626 | −11.5% |
| 1960 | 703 | +12.3% |
| 1970 | 710 | +1.0% |
| 1980 | 735 | +3.5% |
| 1990 | 663 | −9.8% |
| 2000 | 716 | +8.0% |
| 2010 | 698 | −2.5% |
| 2020 | 651 | −6.7% |
Source:"U.S. Census website". United States Census Bureau. and Iowa Data Center; Source: U.S. Decennial Census

=== 2020 census ===
As of the census of 2020, there were 651 people, 262 households, and 157 families residing in the city. The population density was 637.0 inhabitants per square mile (246.0/km^{2}). There were 304 housing units at an average density of 297.5 per square mile (114.9/km^{2}). The racial makeup of the city was 95.7% White, 1.7% Black or African American, 0.0% Native American, 0.0% Asian, 0.0% Pacific Islander, 0.0% from other races and 2.6% from two or more races. Hispanic or Latino persons of any race comprised 0.8% of the population.

Of the 262 households, 27.1% of which had children under the age of 18 living with them, 44.7% were married couples living together, 13.0% were cohabitating couples, 20.6% had a female householder with no spouse or partner present and 21.8% had a male householder with no spouse or partner present. 40.1% of all households were non-families. 29.4% of all households were made up of individuals, 14.9% had someone living alone who was 65 years old or older.

The median age in the city was 36.9 years. 26.6% of the residents were under the age of 20; 4.8% were between the ages of 20 and 24; 28.3% were from 25 and 44; 22.9% were from 45 and 64; and 17.5% were 65 years of age or older. The gender makeup of the city was 51.2% male and 48.8% female.

=== 2010 census ===
As of the census of 2010, there were 698 people, 295 households, and 193 families living in the city. The population density was 677.7 inhabitants per square mile (261.7/km^{2}). There were 324 housing units at an average density of 314.6 per square mile (121.5/km^{2}). The racial makeup of the city was 97.3% White, 1.1% African American, 0.1% Native American, 1.0% Asian, 0.1% from other races, and 0.3% from two or more races. Hispanic or Latino of any race were 1.6% of the population.

There were 295 households, of which 29.8% had children under the age of 18 living with them, 49.5% were married couples living together, 11.2% had a female householder with no husband present, 4.7% had a male householder with no wife present, and 34.6% were non-families. 25.1% of all households were made up of individuals, and 10.5% had someone living alone who was 65 years of age or older. The average household size was 2.37 and the average family size was 2.83.

The median age in the city was 40.8 years. 23.4% of residents were under the age of 18; 7.4% were between the ages of 18 and 24; 23.1% were from 25 to 44; 28.9% were from 45 to 64; and 17.2% were 65 years of age or older. The gender makeup of the city was 50.3% male and 49.7% female.

=== 2000 census ===
As of the census of 2000, there were 716 people, 291 households, and 197 families living in the city. The population density was 720.1 inhabitants per square mile (278.0/km^{2}). There were 323 housing units at an average density of 324.8 per square mile (125.4/km^{2}). The racial makeup of the city was 98.32% White, 0.42% African American, 0.28% Native American, and 0.98% from two or more races. Hispanic or Latino of any race were 1.26% of the population.

There were 291 households, out of which 30.9% had children under the age of 18 living with them, 50.9% were married couples living together, 11.7% had a female householder with no husband present, and 32.3% were non-families. 25.8% of all households were made up of individuals, and 13.4% had someone living alone who was 65 years of age or older. The average household size was 2.46 and the average family size was 2.91.

In the city, the population was spread out, with 25.3% under the age of 18, 7.8% from 18 to 24, 28.6% from 25 to 44, 21.1% from 45 to 64, and 17.2% who were 65 years of age or older. The median age was 38 years. For every 100 females, there were 100.6 males. For every 100 females age 18 and over, there were 95.3 males.

The median income for a household in the city was $33,906, and the median income for a family was $39,091. Males had a median income of $30,000 versus $16,250 for females. The per capita income for the city was $14,809. About 7.5% of families and 11.2% of the population were below the poverty line, including 14.6% of those under age 18 and 15.1% of those age 65 or over.

== Education ==
Olin is home to the Olin Consolidated Community School District, serving Olin and the surrounding area. In 2012, the school board voted to close the junior and senior high school, sending them to the Anamosa School District as part of a three-year, whole-grade sharing agreement.

Athletic teams were known as the Lions. The school was part of several athletic conferences, the last one being the Big East. In 2011, the school discontinued its athletic program, opting to begin cooperative programs with Anamosa.
