= Washington Township, Jones County, Iowa =

Township in Jones County, Iowa, U.S.

Coordinates: 42.2522°N 90.9561°W

Washington Township is a township in Jones County, Iowa, United States.

== History ==
Washington Township was organized in 1842.
