= Martelle, Iowa =

- City
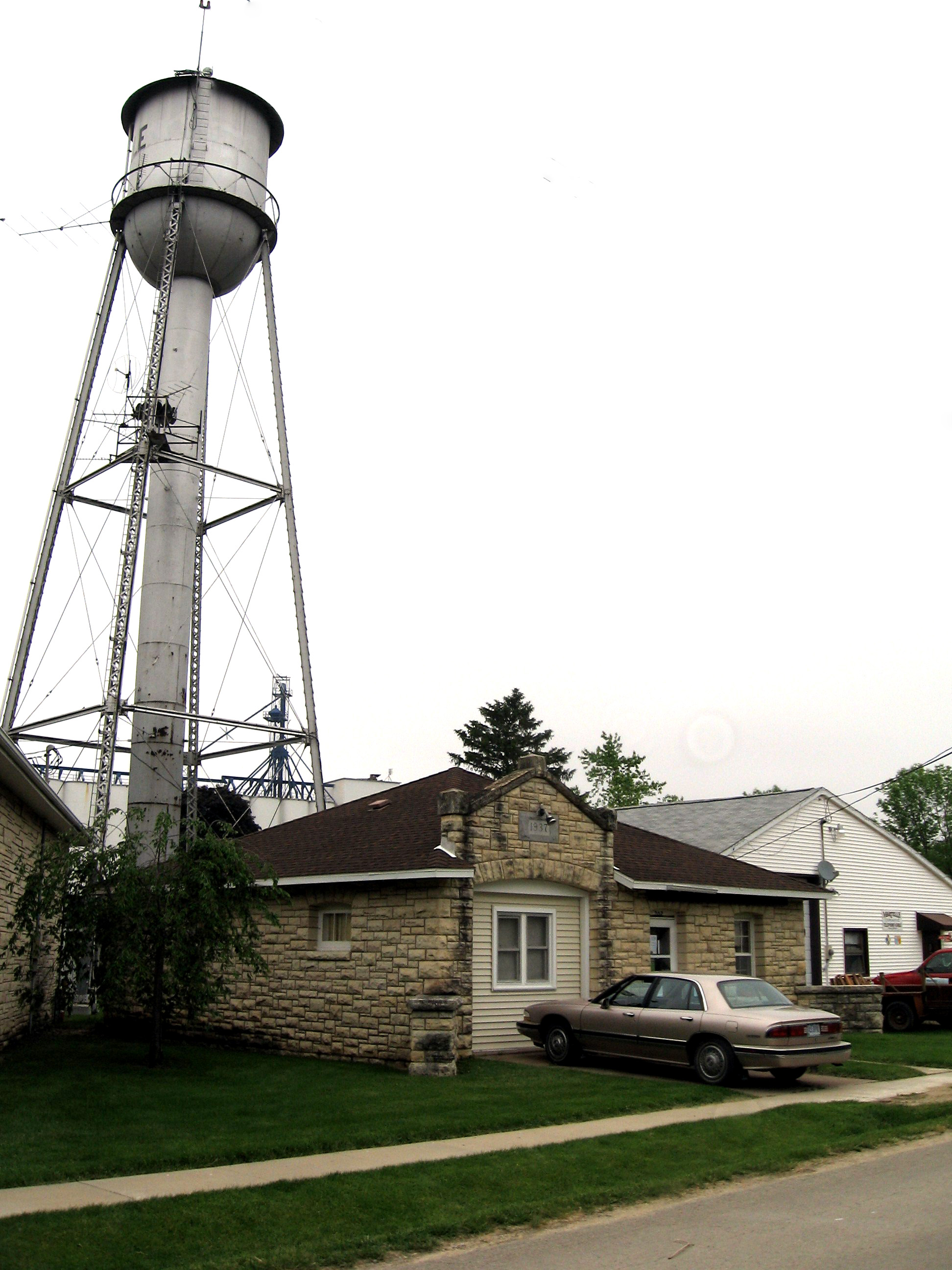
- Water Tower in Martelle, Iowa

- Location of Martelle, Iowa
- Coordinates: 42°1′14″N 91°21′28″W
- Country: United States
- State: Iowa
- County: Jones

Area
  - Total: 0.31 sq mi (0.81 km^{2})
  - Land: 0.31 sq mi (0.81 km^{2})
  - Water: 0 sq mi (0.00 km^{2})
- Elevation: 909 ft (277 m)

Population (2020)
  - Total: 249
  - Density: 800.7/sq mi (309.17/km^{2})
- Time zone: UTC-6 (Central (CST))
  - Summer (DST): UTC-5 (CDT)
- ZIP code: 52305
- Area code: 319
- FIPS code: 19-49845
- GNIS feature ID: 2395027

Martelle, Iowa is a city in Jones County, Iowa, United States. The population was 249 at the time of the 2020 census. It is part of the Cedar Rapids Metropolitan Statistical Area.

== History ==
Martelle was platted in 1872 when the Chicago, Milwaukee, St. Paul and Pacific Railroad was being built through the neighborhood.

== Geography ==
According to the United States Census Bureau, the city has a total area of 0.34 square miles (0.88 km^{2}), all land.

== Demographics ==
Historical populations
Year	Pop.	±%
1880	96	—
1890	125	+30.2%
1900	158	+26.4%
1910	178	+12.7%
1920	156	−12.4%
1930	185	+18.6%
1940	215	+16.2%
1950	228	+6.0%
1960	247	+8.3%
1970	341	+38.1%
1980	316	−7.3%
1990	290	−8.2%
2000	280	−3.4%
2010	255	−8.9%
2020	249	−2.4%
Source:"U.S. Census website". United States Census Bureau. and Iowa Data Center; Source: U.S. Decennial Census

=== 2020 census ===
As of the census of 2020, there were 249 people, 110 households, and 81 families residing in the city. The population density was 800.7 inhabitants per square mile (309.2/km^{2}). There were 116 housing units at an average density of 373.0 per square mile (144.0/km^{2}). The racial makeup of the city was 97.6% White, 0.0% Black or African American, 0.0% Native American, 0.0% Asian, 0.0% Pacific Islander, 0.0% from other races and 2.4% from two or more races. Hispanic or Latino persons of any race comprised 2.0% of the population.

Of the 110 households, 38.2% of which had children under the age of 18 living with them, 55.5% were married couples living together, 6.4% were cohabitating couples, 14.5% had a female householder with no spouse or partner present and 23.6% had a male householder with no spouse or partner present. 26.4% of all households were non-families. 20.9% of all households were made up of individuals, 6.4% had someone living alone who was 65 years old or older.

The median age in the city was 36.1 years. 23.7% of the residents were under the age of 20; 1.6% were between the ages of 20 and 24; 31.7% were from 25 and 44; 29.3% were from 45 and 64; and 13.7% were 65 years of age or older. The gender makeup of the city was 52.2% male and 47.8% female.

=== 2010 census ===
As of the census of 2010, there were 255 people, 114 households, and 81 families living in the city. The population density was 750.0 inhabitants per square mile (289.6/km^{2}). There were 122 housing units at an average density of 358.8 per square mile (138.5/km^{2}). The racial makeup of the city was 97.6% White, 1.6% Asian, and 0.8% from two or more races. Hispanic or Latino of any race were 0.8% of the population.

There were 114 households, of which 19.3% had children under the age of 18 living with them, 61.4% were married couples living together, 7.0% had a female householder with no husband present, 2.6% had a male householder with no wife present, and 28.9% were non-families. 20.2% of all households were made up of individuals, and 10.5% had someone living alone who was 65 years of age or older. The average household size was 2.24 and the average family size was 2.59.

The median age in the city was 45.7 years. 16.5% of residents were under the age of 18; 7.4% were between the ages of 18 and 24; 23.5% were from 25 to 44; 31.4% were from 45 to 64; and 21.2% were 65 years of age or older. The gender makeup of the city was 48.2% male and 51.8% female.

=== 2000 census ===
As of the census of 2000, there were 280 people, 109 households, and 85 families living in the city. The population density was 849.8 inhabitants per square mile (328.1/km^{2}). There were 115 housing units at an average density of 349.0 per square mile (134.7/km^{2}). The racial makeup of the city was 99.29% White, 0.36% Asian, and 0.36% from two or more races.

The median income for a household in the city was $47,500, and the median income for a family was $50,313. Males had a median income of $32,500 versus $21,964 for females. The per capita income for the city was $20,134. About 2.5% of families and 2.9% of the population were below the poverty line, including 2.5% of those under the age of eighteen and none of those sixty-five or over.

== Education ==
Anamosa Community School District operates schools serving this community.
