= Greenfield Township, Jones County, Iowa =

Township in Jones County, Iowa, U.S.

Coordinates: 41.9908°N 91.3069°W

Greenfield Township is a township in Jones County, Iowa.
