= Boulder Township, Linn County, Iowa =

Township in Linn County, Iowa

Coordinates: 42.2514°N 91.4206°W

Boulder Township is a township in Linn County, Iowa.

== History ==
Boulder Township (historically spelled Bowlder) was organized in 1858.
