= Richland Township, Jones County, Iowa =

Township in Jones County, Iowa, U.S.

Coordinates: 42.2522°N 91.0722°W

Richland Township is a township in Jones County, Iowa, United States.

== History ==
Richland Township was organized in 1842.
