= Center Junction, Iowa =

- Census-designated place
- Location of Center Junction, Iowa
- Coordinates: 42°6′59″N 91°5′17″W
- Country: United States
- State: Iowa
- County: Jones

Area
  - Total: 0.73 sq mi (1.90 km^{2})
  - Land: 0.73 sq mi (1.90 km^{2})
  - Water: 0 sq mi (0.00 km^{2})
- Elevation: 909 ft (277 m)

Population (2020)
  - Total: 100
  - Density: 136.2/sq mi (52.58/km^{2})
- Time zone: UTC-6 (Central (CST))
  - Summer (DST): UTC-5 (CDT)
- ZIP code: 52212
- Area code: 563
- FIPS code: 19-12225
- GNIS feature ID: 0455289

Center Junction is an unincorporated village and census-designated place (CDP) in Jones County, Iowa, United States. The population was 100 at the 2020 census. It is part of the Cedar Rapids Metropolitan Statistical Area.

Center Junction was once an incorporated city, but following a special election that served as a referendum on the plan, the city council voted in 2015 to sell off its assets, disband, and turn administration over to the county. When the council took the action, then-Mayor Sandy Ricklefs cited the town's ailing finances as the primary reason for disbanding.

== History ==
Center Junction was laid out in 1871. The town promoters hoped the place would become a junction near the geographical center of Jones County, hence the name. The population was 198 in 1940.

There was a junction between the Chicago & Northwestern Railway and the Chicago, Minneapolis, St. Paul & Pacific Railway at Center Junction for many years. The Chicago & NorthWestern discontinued service on the line in 1951.

== Geography ==
Center Junction is located at 42°6′59″N 91°5′17″W (42.116326, -91.088070).

According to the United States Census Bureau, the city has a total area of 0.55 square miles (1.42 km^{2}), all land.

== Demographics ==
Historical populations
Year	Pop.	±%
1880	190	—
1890	210	+10.5%
1900	255	+21.4%
1910	199	−22.0%
1920	225	+13.1%
1930	198	−12.0%
1940	204	+3.0%
1950	153	−25.0%
1960	201	+31.4%
1970	172	−14.4%
1980	182	+5.8%
1990	166	−8.8%
2000	131	−21.1%
2010	111	−15.3%
2014	111	+0.0%
2015	111	+0.0%
2020	100	−9.9%
Source:"U.S. Census website". United States Census Bureau. and Iowa Data Center; Source: U.S. Decennial Census

=== 2020 census ===
As of the census of 2020, there were 100 people, 44 households, and 29 families residing in the community. The population density was 136.2 inhabitants per square mile (52.6/km^{2}). There were 56 housing units at an average density of 76.3 per square mile (29.4/km^{2}). The racial makeup of the community was 90.0% White, 0.0% Black or African American, 2.0% Native American, 0.0% Asian, 0.0% Pacific Islander, 2.0% from other races and 6.0% from two or more races. Hispanic or Latino persons of any race comprised 3.0% of the population.

Of the 44 households, 11.4% of which had children under the age of 18 living with them, 52.3% were married couples living together, 4.5% were cohabitating couples, 18.2% had a female householder with no spouse or partner present and 25.0% had a male householder with no spouse or partner present. 34.1% of all households were non-families. 29.5% of all households were made up of individuals, 11.4% had someone living alone who was 65 years old or older.

The median age in the community was 54.5 years. 19.0% of the residents were under the age of 20; 3.0% were between the ages of 20 and 24; 18.0% were from 25 and 44; 26.0% were from 45 and 64; and 34.0% were 65 years of age or older. The gender makeup of the community was 52.0% male and 48.0% female.

=== 2010 census ===
As of the census of 2010, there were 111 people, 53 households, and 34 families residing in the city. The population density was 201.8 inhabitants per square mile (77.9/km^{2}). There were 58 housing units at an average density of 105.5 per square mile (40.7/km^{2}). The racial makeup of the city was 100.0% White. Hispanic or Latino of any race were 4.5% of the population.

There were 53 households, of which 17.0% had children under the age of 18 living with them, 56.6% were married couples living together, 3.8% had a female householder with no husband present, 3.8% had a male householder with no wife present, and 35.8% were non-families. 32.1% of all households were made up of individuals, and 15.1% had someone living alone who was 65 years of age or older. The average household size was 2.09 and the average family size was 2.59.

The median age in the city was 49.9 years. 14.4% of residents were under the age of 18; 4.5% were between the ages of 18 and 24; 19.8% were from 25 to 44; 36.9% were from 45 to 64; and 24.3% were 65 years of age or older. The gender makeup of the city was 51.4% male and 48.6% female.

=== 2000 census ===
As of the census of 2000, there were 131 people, 59 households, and 35 families residing in the city. The population density was 326.1 inhabitants per square mile (125.9/km^{2}). There were 65 housing units at an average density of 161.8 per square mile (62.5/km^{2}). The racial makeup of the city was 97.71% White, and 2.29% from two or more races. Hispanic or Latino of any race were 0.76% of the population.

There were 59 households, out of which 25.4% had children under the age of 18 living with them, 55.9% were married couples living together, 5.1% had a female householder with no husband present, and 39.0% were non-families. 33.9% of all households were made up of individuals, and 18.6% had someone living alone who was 65 years of age or older. The average household size was 2.22 and the average family size was 2.89.

In the city, the population was spread out, with 19.8% under the age of 18, 6.1% from 18 to 24, 25.2% from 25 to 44, 29.8% from 45 to 64, and 19.1% who were 65 years of age or older. The median age was 44 years. For every 100 females, there were 98.5 males. For every 100 females age 18 and over, there were 90.9 males.

The median income for a household in the city was $32,917, and the median income for a family was $41,750. Males had a median income of $30,625 versus $20,500 for females. The per capita income for the city was $16,476. There were no families and 5.7% of the population living below the poverty line, including no under eighteens and 17.4% of those over 64.

== See also ==
- List of Discontinued cities in Iowa
