= Nairn, Middlesex County, Ontario =

Community in Ontario, Canada

Coordinates: 43.114°N 81.569°W

Location of Nairn in Ontario

Nairn is a community in the municipality of North Middlesex, located in Middlesex County, Ontario.

Nairn is a small community originally named East Williams. It has a population of around three hundred and sixty people. It contains a public school, a community park, a feed store, a bus depot, an antiques dealer, a local community church and a cemetery.
