= Lovell Township, Jones County, Iowa =

Township in Jones County, Iowa, U.S.

Coordinates: 42.2478°N 91.1847°W

Lovell Township is a township in Jones County, Iowa.

== History ==
Lovell Township was organized in 1898.
