= Castle Grove Township, Jones County, Iowa =

Township in Jones County, Iowa, US

Coordinates: 42.2528°N 91.3053°W

Castle Grove Township is a township in Jones County, Iowa.

== History ==
Castle Grove Township was organized in 1855. The area used to have a Catholic Church, Immaculate Conception Catholic Church, however, the church now sits empty, there is a cemetery next to the building, and just up the street is the Lutheran Cemetery. The Parish of Immaculate Conception was founded in the 1850s and the current church building was completed in 1877, after multiple attempts to build the church were plagued with severe weather and malicious destruction via a fire to the first building the night it was completed, the church also had a school building behind it, that was made from the remaining structure that was struck by a tornado during the rebuilding after the fire. After this church was completed it remained a prominent fixture among the Iowa cornfields for more than 120 years. Effective July 1 of 2002, the church would no longer held weekly Mass, and was downgraded to Oratory status, keeping it available for weddings, funerals, and on Dec 8th for the feast day of the Immaculate Conception, the diocese officially closed the church in 2007 or 2008 and the property, excluding the cemetery was sold to a private owner shortly thereafter. In July 2002, the parishioners of Immaculate Conception had to start attending Mass in nearby Monticello, Hopkinton, or Prairieburg. The church now sits abandoned. The diocese still owns the adjacent cemetery. The parish itself dated back to 1854 and the current building was built in 1877, after the previous church was maliciously burned down on the night it was completed, prior to that, a log church had been built and dedicated to St. Aloysius Gonzaga, the parish namesake was changed to honor the dogma of the Immaculate Conception of the Blessed Virgin Mary, which was approved by the Catholic Church in 1854.
