= Jones County, Iowa =

County in Iowa, United States

- County
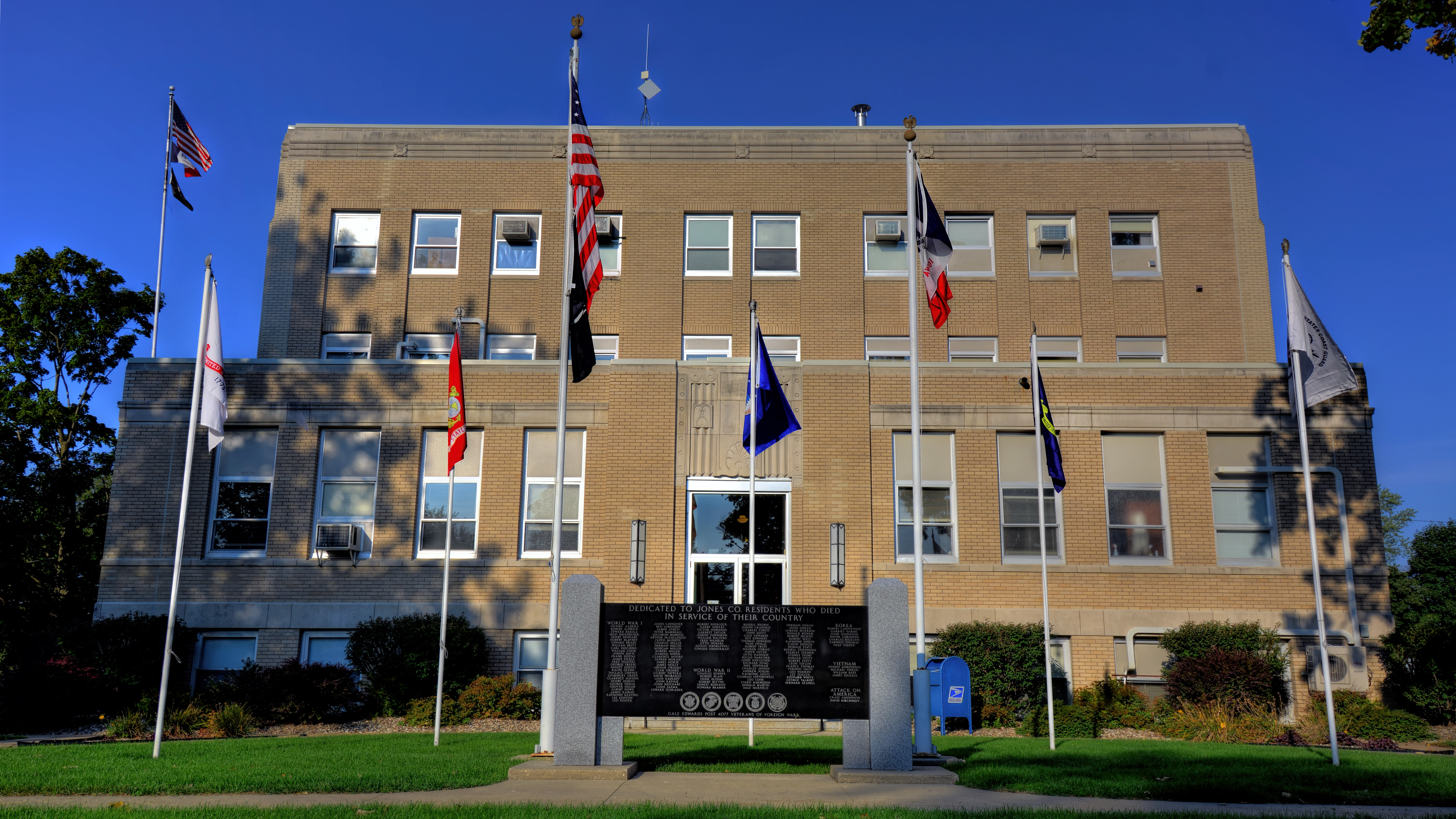
- The Jones County Courthouse in Anamosa

- Location within the U.S. state of Iowa
- Coordinates: 42°07′12″N 91°08′05″W
- Country: United States
- State: Iowa
- Founded: December 21, 1837
- Named for: George Wallace Jones
- Seat: Anamosa
- Largest city: Anamosa

Area
  - Total: 577 sq mi (1,490 km^{2})
  - Land: 576 sq mi (1,490 km^{2})
  - Water: 1.4 sq mi (3.6 km^{2}) 0.2%

Population (2020)
  - Total: 20,646
  - Estimate (2025): 21,253 ▲
  - Density: 35.8/sq mi (13.8/km^{2})
- Time zone: UTC−6 (Central)
  - Summer (DST): UTC−5 (CDT)
- Congressional district: 1st
- Website: www.jonescountyiowa.gov
- Iowa county number 53

Jones County is a county in the U.S. state of Iowa. As of the 2020 census the population was 20,646. The county seat and the largest city is Anamosa. The county was founded in 1837 and named after George Wallace Jones, a United States senator and member of Congress.

Jones County is included in the Cedar Rapids metropolitan area.

== Geography ==
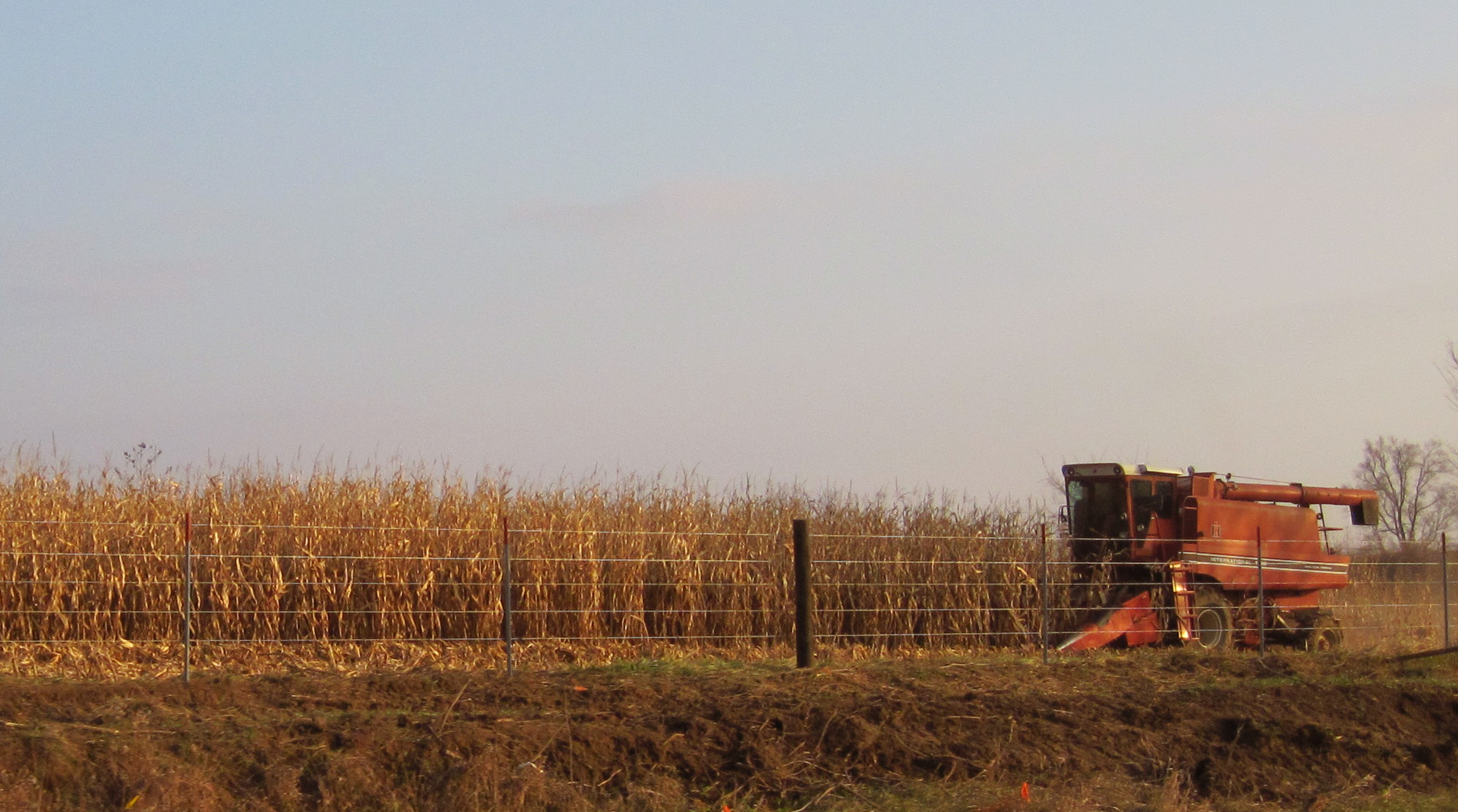
Harvesting corn during the record 2009 season in Jones County.

According to the United States Census Bureau, the county has a total area of 577 square miles (1,490 km^{2}), of which 576 square miles (1,490 km^{2}) is land and 1.4 square miles (3.6 km^{2}) (0.2%) is water.

=== Major highways ===
- U.S. Highway 151
- Iowa Highway 1
- Iowa Highway 38
- Iowa Highway 64
- Iowa Highway 136

=== Airport ===
Monticello Regional Airport (MXO) serves the county and surrounding communities.

=== Adjacent counties ===
- Delaware County (northwest)
- Dubuque County (northeast)
- Jackson County (east)
- Clinton County (southeast)
- Cedar County (south)
- Linn County (west)

== Parks ==
- Wapsipinicon State Park - Anamosa
- Central Park
- Pictured Rocks County Park
- Wapsipinicon State Park – This 400-acre park includes hiking, climbing, nature study, fishing in the Wapsipinicon River, modern camping, picnicking and golf. The park is covered with vegetation and trees, and hik¬ing reveals a multitude of flowers and wildlife. A road makes a complete circle of the park, winding between the river and bluffs, where the view is great. Included along the drive is a trip through the oldest plant¬ing of white pine in Iowa. There are also several caves such as Horse Thief Cave and Ice Cave. The Wapsi has long been famous for its channel and flathead catfish, as well as spring crappies and bullheads, especially below the dam at the park's entrance. Bass, walleye and northern also inhabit the waters. Of the 30 campsites, 15 have electricity. Running water and hot showers are available for modern camping, and mushroom hunting is allowed. Wapsipinicon Country Club maintains a nine-hole golf course in the park. The park has two lodges – one heated and one for summer use – that are available upon reservation with the park ranger. For more information, call 319-462-2761. For information about golfing, call the Wapsipinicon Country Club at 319-462-3930.
- Central Park: This 217-acre park is located four miles southeast of Amber off County Roads X44 and E29 and Central Park Road. Campsites and the park's 25-acre lake are the main draws to Central Park. Campsites range from primitive to full hook-up. Central Parks other amenities include a swimming beach, sand volleyball area, horseshoe pits, playground, boat ramp, hiking trails, rental pavilions, handicapped-accessible fishing pier, picnic areas, rental cabins and a nature center. The Central Park Nature Center is open 1-5 p.m. Saturdays and Sundays, Memorial Day through Labor Day weekend.
- Pictured Rocks Park – Located south of Monticello off Highway 38, this park offers hiking, climbing and access to the Maquoketa River. Picnic shelters, restrooms, playground equipment, and a boat ramp are available.
- Whitewater Canyon – Known for its beauty, the Whitewater Canyon area totals 562 acres of timber, restored prairie, and riverine habitat. Public hunting and fishing are allowed, and mowed hiking trails provide year-round recreational opportunities. This area is located east of Cascade on Highway 151, and south on Curoe Road.
- Mon-Maq Dam – Located one mile northeast of Monticello along the Maquoketa River, this river access includes 63 acres of riverine habitat. Known for its fishing holes, the Mon-Maq Dam area provides fishing fun for local anglers. Sandy areas downstream from the dam serve as put-in sites for canoeists and kayakers.
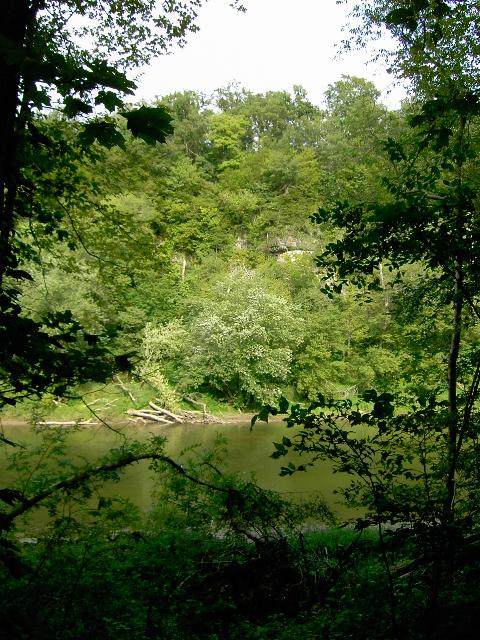

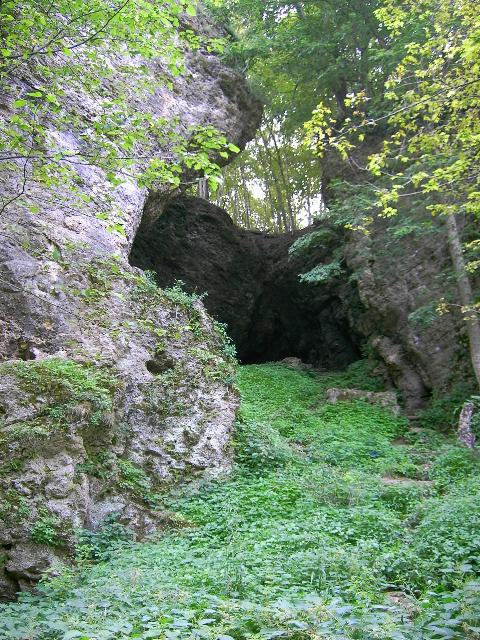

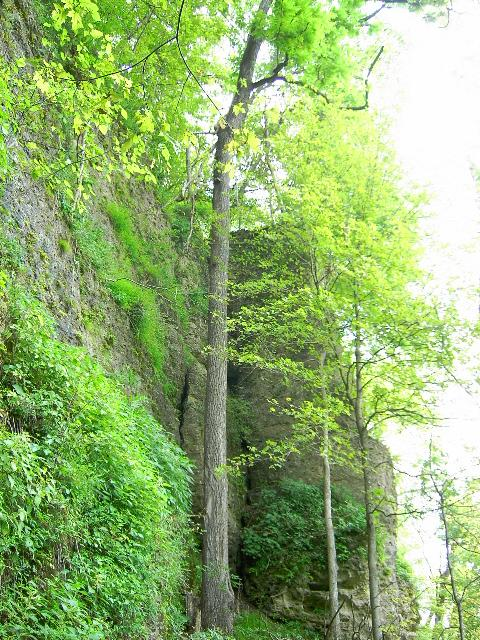

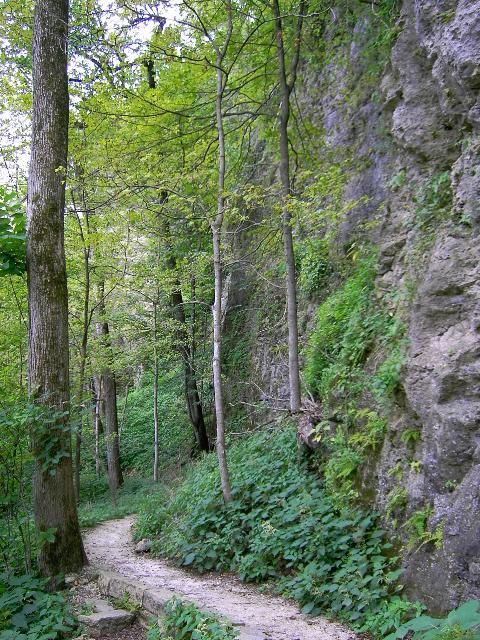

== Demographics ==
Historical population
Census	Pop.	Note	%±
1850	3,007		—
1860	13,306		342.5%
1870	19,731		48.3%
1880	21,052		6.7%
1890	20,233		−3.9%
1900	21,954		8.5%
1910	19,050		−13.2%
1920	18,607		−2.3%
1930	19,206		3.2%
1940	19,950		3.9%
1950	19,401		−2.8%
1960	20,693		6.7%
1970	19,868		−4.0%
1980	20,401		2.7%
1990	19,444		−4.7%
2000	20,221		4.0%
2010	20,638		2.1%
2020	20,646		0.0%
2025 (est.)	21,253	▲	2.9%
U.S. Decennial Census; 1790–1960 1900–1990; 1990–2000 2010–2020

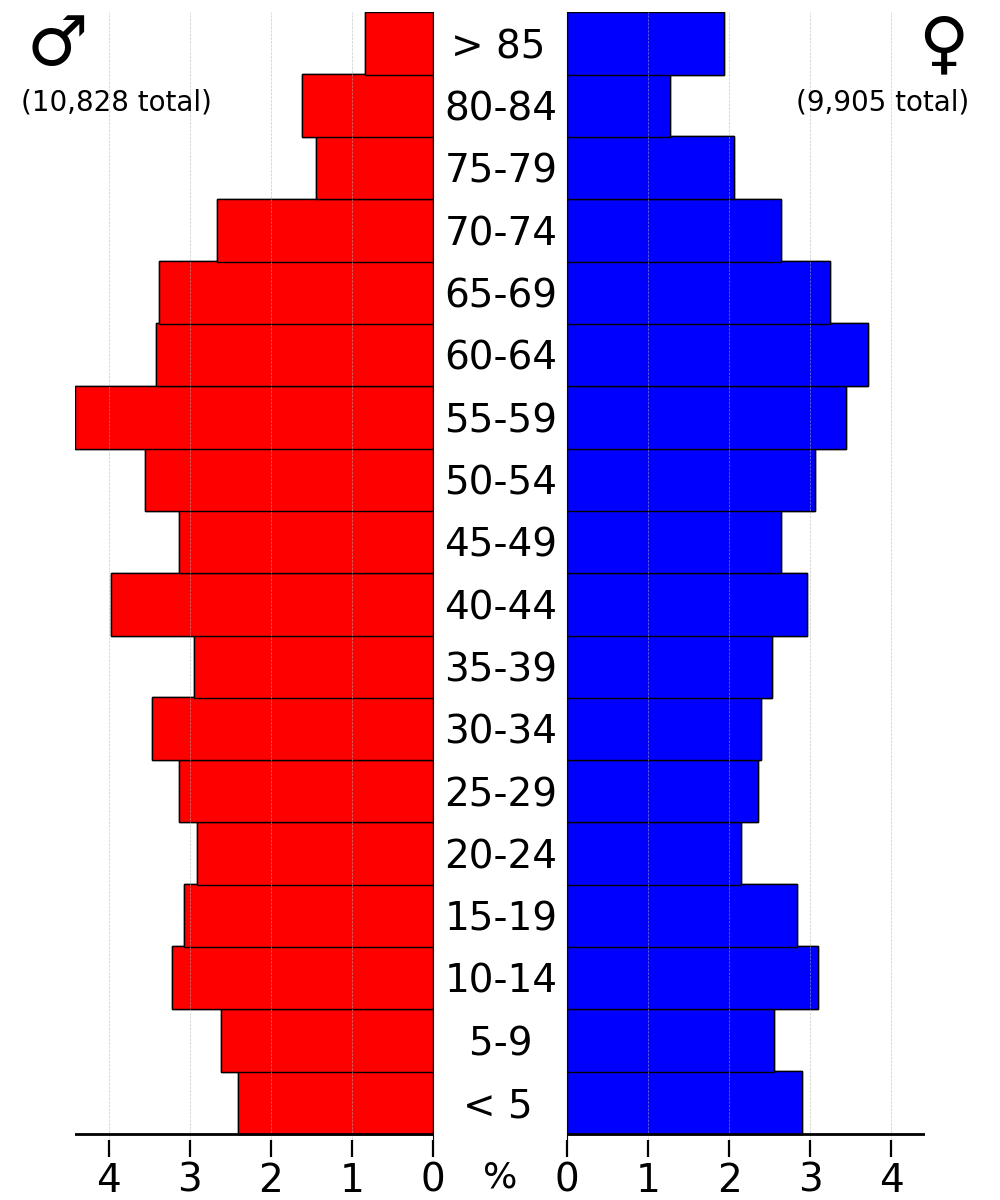
2022 US Census population pyramid for Jones County from ACS 5-year estimates

=== 2020 census ===
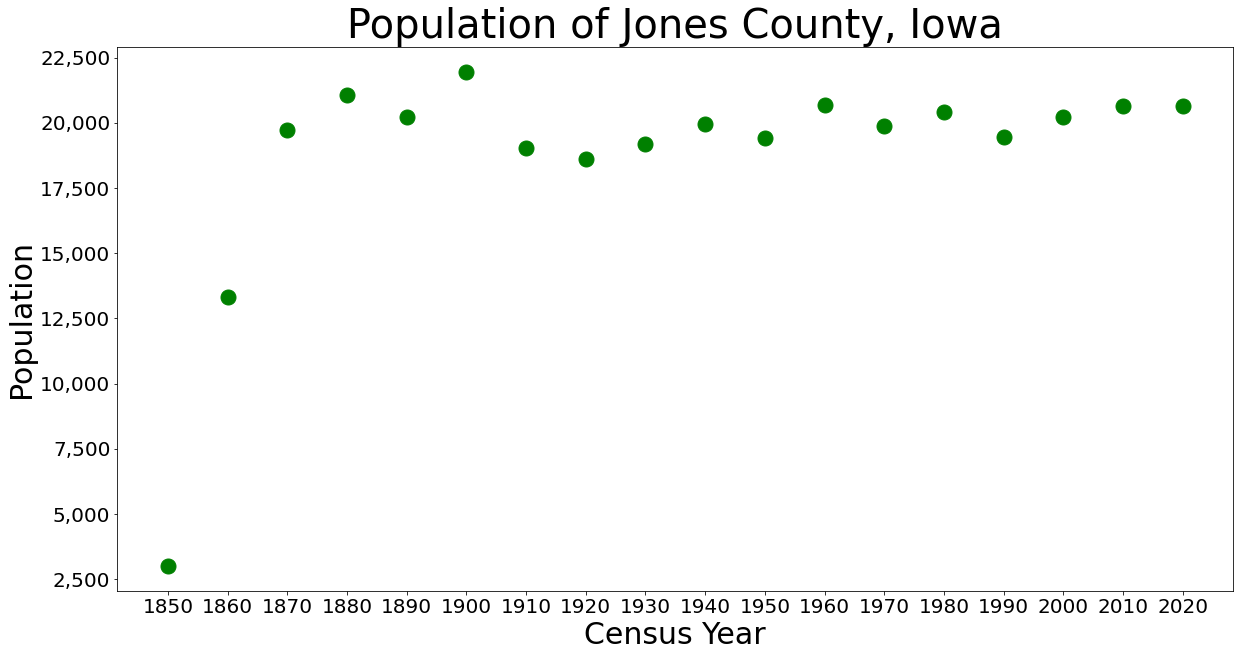
Population of Jones County from the U.S. census data

As of the 2020 census, the county had a population of 20,646 and a population density of 35.9/sq mi (13.9/km^{2}). The median age was 43.3 years, 21.3% of residents were under the age of 18, and 20.9% of residents were 65 years of age or older. For every 100 females there were 111.7 males, and for every 100 females age 18 and over there were 112.6 males age 18 and over.

96.76% of the population reported being of one race. The racial makeup of the county was 93.2% White, 2.1% Black or African American, 0.3% American Indian and Alaska Native, 0.3% Asian, <0.1% Native Hawaiian and Pacific Islander, 0.9% from some other race, and 3.2% from two or more races. Hispanic or Latino residents of any race comprised 2.4% of the population.

26.2% of residents lived in urban areas, while 73.8% lived in rural areas.

There were 8,113 households in the county, of which 27.6% had children under the age of 18 living in them. Of all households, 53.6% were married-couple households, 18.2% were households with a male householder and no spouse or partner present, and 20.8% were households with a female householder and no spouse or partner present. About 28.2% of all households were made up of individuals and 13.8% had someone living alone who was 65 years of age or older.

There were 8,871 housing units, of which 8,113 were occupied; 78.5% were owner-occupied and 21.5% were renter-occupied, with a homeowner vacancy rate of 1.7% and a rental vacancy rate of 10.1%.

=== 2010 census ===
The 2010 census recorded a population of 20,638 in the county, with a population density of 35.9/sq mi (13.9/km^{2}). There were 8,911 housing units, of which 8,151 were occupied.

=== 2000 census ===
As of the 2000 census, there were 20,221 people, 7,560 households, and 5,299 families residing in the county. The population density was 35 inhabitants per square mile (14/km^{2}). There were 8,126 housing units at an average density of 14 per square mile (5.4/km^{2}). The racial makeup of the county was 96.68% White, 1.79% Black or African American, 0.32% Native American, 0.22% Asian, 0.23% from other races, and 0.78% from two or more races. 1.05% of the population were Hispanic or Latino of any race.

There were 7,560 households, out of which 31.00% had children under the age of 18 living with them, 59.00% were married couples living together, 7.90% had a female householder with no husband present, and 29.90% were non-families. 25.30% of all households were made up of individuals, and 12.50% had someone living alone who was 65 years of age or older. The average household size was 2.47 and the average family size was 2.95.

In the county, the population was spread out, with 24.10% under the age of 18, 7.90% from 18 to 24, 29.00% from 25 to 44, 23.30% from 45 to 64, and 15.80% who were 65 years of age or older. The median age was 38 years. For every 100 females, there were 109.30 males. For every 100 females age 18 and over, there were 111.60 males.

The median income for a household in the county was $37,449, and the median income for a family was $44,269. Males had a median income of $31,039 versus $22,075 for females. The per capita income for the county was $17,816. About 6.20% of families and 8.60% of the population were below the poverty line, including 8.80% of those under age 18 and 10.20% of those age 65 or over.

== Communities ==
=== Cities ===
- Anamosa
- Cascade
- Martelle
- Monticello
- Morley
- Olin
- Onslow
- Oxford Junction
- Wyoming

=== Census-designated places ===
- Center Junction
- Stone City

=== Other unincorporated communities ===
- Amber
- Argand
- Canton (partial)
- Cass
- Castle Grove
- East Monticello
- Edinburgh
- Fairview
- Hale
- Langworthy
- Oxford Mills
- Scotch Grove
- Temple Hill

=== Townships ===
- Cass
- Castle Grove
- Clay
- Fairview
- Greenfield
- Hale
- Jackson
- Lovell
- Madison
- Monticello
- Oxford
- Richland
- Rome
- Scotch Grove
- Washington
- Wayne
- Wyoming

=== Population ranking ===
The population ranking of the following table is based on the 2020 census of Jones County.

† county seat

Rank	City/Town/etc.	Municipal type	Population (2020 Census)	Population (2024 Estimate)
1	† Anamosa	City	5,450	5,616
2	Monticello	City	4,040	4,062
3	Cascade (partially in Dubuque County)	City	2,386	2,610
4	Olin	City	651	655
5	Wyoming	City	523	535
6	Oxford Junction	City	424	402
7	Martelle	City	249	255
8	Onslow	City	201	200
9	Stone City	CDP	186	199
10	Center Junction	CDP	100	118
11	Morley	City	96	89

== Politics ==
After voting for the Democratic nominee in its first two elections in 1848 and 1852 prior to the founding of the Republican Party, Jones County thereafter leaned Republican until 1988. It voted Democrat only four times between 1856 and 1984, in 1912 for Woodrow Wilson when he won with a plurality of the vote after former Republican Theodore Roosevelt ran as the Progressive candidate, leading to a fracture in the national Republican Party, then backing Franklin D. Roosevelt in his two landslide victories of 1932 and 1936, and then supporting Lyndon B. Johnson during his 1964 landslide. From 1988 to 2012, Jones County favored the Democratic nominee in each election. In 2016, Donald Trump flipped the county back to the Republican column, capturing over 56% of the county's vote, the best Republican performance in the county since the 1972 landslide victory of Richard Nixon. Trump increased his vote share to almost 60% in 2020 and increased his margin of victory to over 21%, the first election in the county decided by a margin of over 20% since 1964.

United States presidential election results for Jones County, Iowa
Year	Republican		Democratic		Third party(ies)	
Year	No.	%	No.	%	No.	%
1896	3,057	57.84%	2,143	40.55%	85	1.61%
1900	3,021	58.72%	2,052	39.88%	72	1.40%
1904	2,833	59.17%	1,834	38.30%	121	2.53%
1908	2,453	52.11%	2,176	46.23%	78	1.66%
1912	1,622	35.52%	2,189	47.93%	756	16.55%
1916	2,848	58.62%	1,966	40.47%	44	0.91%
1920	5,962	70.46%	2,436	28.79%	63	0.74%
1924	4,524	57.14%	2,212	27.94%	1,182	14.93%
1928	5,090	62.83%	2,976	36.74%	35	0.43%
1932	3,500	41.17%	4,952	58.25%	49	0.58%
1936	4,141	44.26%	5,052	54.00%	163	1.74%
1940	5,630	56.70%	4,273	43.04%	26	0.26%
1944	4,453	55.44%	3,563	44.36%	16	0.20%
1948	4,290	51.55%	3,915	47.04%	117	1.41%
1952	6,070	66.90%	2,991	32.97%	12	0.13%
1956	5,605	62.51%	3,352	37.38%	10	0.11%
1960	5,541	58.52%	3,924	41.44%	4	0.04%
1964	3,154	36.37%	5,511	63.55%	7	0.08%
1968	4,513	53.65%	3,415	40.60%	484	5.75%
1972	4,962	58.23%	3,468	40.70%	91	1.07%
1976	4,463	50.54%	4,245	48.07%	123	1.39%
1980	4,506	50.56%	3,521	39.50%	886	9.94%
1984	4,907	55.82%	3,825	43.51%	59	0.67%
1988	3,496	42.71%	4,641	56.70%	48	0.59%
1992	3,071	34.51%	3,508	39.42%	2,321	26.08%
1996	3,083	35.93%	4,668	54.40%	830	9.67%
2000	4,201	45.95%	4,690	51.30%	252	2.76%
2004	4,834	48.45%	5,054	50.65%	90	0.90%
2008	4,405	44.01%	5,446	54.42%	157	1.57%
2012	4,721	45.18%	5,534	52.96%	194	1.86%
2016	5,720	56.45%	3,787	37.37%	626	6.18%
2020	6,572	59.81%	4,213	38.34%	204	1.86%
2024	6,820	62.11%	3,942	35.90%	218	1.99%

== See also ==
- National Register of Historic Places listings in Jones County, Iowa
