= List of unincorporated communities in Iowa =

This is a list of unincorporated communities in the U.S. state of Iowa, arranged in alphabetical order. This list contains a number of historical communities which no longer exist, and also includes a number of disincorporated cities.

== A ==
- Abbott
- Abingdon
- Adaville
- Adaza
- Adelphi
- Albany
- Albaton
- Alice
- Allen
- Allendorf
- Almont
- Almoral
- Alpha
- Amana
- Amber
- Ambrose
- Amish
- Amund
- Anderson
- Andover
- Andrews
- Angus
- Arbor Hill
- Ardon
- Argand
- Argo
- Argyle
- Armah
- Armour
- Arnold
- Artesian
- Ascot
- Ash Grove
- Ashawa
- Ashland
- Astor
- Athelstan (Disincorporated in 2004)
- Attica
- Atwood
- Augusta
- Aureola
- Austinville
- Avery
- Avon
- Avon Lake
- Ayresville

== B ==
- Bailey
- Baird
- Balfour
- Ballyclough
- Bangor
- Bard
- Barney
- Barrell
- Bartlett
- Bauer
- Beaches Resort
- Beaverdale
- Beckwith
- Beebeetown
- Beech
- Belinda
- Belknap
- Bell
- Bellefountain
- Beloit
- Bennettsville
- Benson
- Bentley
- Bentonsport
- Berea
- Berlin
- Berne
- Bernhart
- Bernina
- Berwick
- Bethany Hall
- Bethel
- Bethelhem
- Bethesda
- Beulah
- Bidwell
- Big Mound
- Big Rock
- Bingham
- Birchwood Estates
- Black Corners
- Black Hawk
- Blackhawk
- Bladensburg
- Blanden
- Blessing
- Bliedorn
- Blockly
- Bloomington
- Bluff Creek
- Bluff Park
- Bluffton
- Boies
- Bolan
- Bolton
- Bonair
- Booneville
- Border Plains
- Botna
- Bowsher
- Boyd
- Boyer
- Boyer River
- Bradford, Franklin County, Iowa
- Bradford, Chickasaw County, Iowa
- Brainard
- Brazil
- Bremer
- Brevick
- Bricker
- Bridgeport
- Bristol
- Bromley
- Brompton
- Brook Mount
- Brookdale
- Brooks
- Brookville
- Browns
- Brownsville
- Brownville
- Brucewell
- Brushy
- Bryant
- Bryantsburg
- Bubona
- Buchanan
- Buck Creek
- Buck Creek
- Buckhorn
- Buckingham
- Bucknell
- Budd
- Buena Vista
- Buffalo Heights
- Bulgers Hollow
- Bullard
- Burchinal
- Burdette
- Burnside
- Burr Oak
- Bushville
- Butler Center
- Buxton

== C ==
- Cairo
- Caldwell Siding
- Calhoun
- California Junction
- Caloma
- Cambria
- Cameron
- Cameron
- Camp Dodge
- Campbell
- Canby
- Canfield
- Canoe
- Canton
- Capitol Heights
- Carbondale
- Carl
- Carmel
- Carnarvon
- Carnes
- Carney
- Carnforth
- Carrollton
- Carrville
- Cartersville
- Casino Beach
- Cass
- Castle Grove
- Castle Hill
- Cathedral Square
- Cattese
- Cedar
- Cedar Bluff
- Cedar City
- Cedar Falls Junction
- Cedar Hills
- Cedar Knoll Park
- Cedar Valley
- Center Grove
- Center Junction (Disincorporated in 2015)
- Centerdale
- Central Heights
- Ceres
- Chaney
- Chapin
- Charleston
- Chautauqua
- Cheney
- Chequest
- Chickasaw
- Church
- Churchville
- Clara
- Clark
- Clarkdale
- Clay Mills
- Clayton Center
- Cleves
- Cliffland
- Climax
- Climbing Hill
- Clinton Center
- Cloud
- Cloverdale
- Clucas
- Clyde
- Coal City
- Coal Creek
- Coal Valley
- Coalville
- Collett
- Columbia
- Commerce
- Communia
- Competine
- Confidence
- Conger
- Conover
- Conroy
- Consol
- Cool
- Cooper
- Cordova
- Corley
- Cornelia
- Cornell
- Cosgrove
- Coster
- Cottage
- Cottage Hill
- Cottonville
- Cou Falls
- Covington
- Cranston
- Crathorne
- Crestwood
- Creswell
- Cricket
- Crisp
- Crocker
- Croton

== D ==
- Dahlonega
- Dairyville
- Dalby
- Dale
- Dales Ford
- Danville Center
- Darbyville
- Davis Corners
- Dayfield
- Daytonville
- Dean
- Deer Creek
- Deerfield
- Delphos (Disincorporated in 2017)
- Denhart
- Denmark
- Denova
- Depew
- Devon
- Dewar
- Dewey
- Diamond
- Diamondhead Lake
- Dickieville
- Dillon
- Dinsdale
- Dixie
- Dodgeville
- Donnan (Disincorporated in 1991)
- Donnelley
- Dorchester
- Doris
- Doubleday
- Douds
- Douglass
- Dover
- Dover Mills
- Downers Grove
- Downey
- Dresden
- Drew
- Dudley
- Dumfries
- Dunbar
- Duncan
- Durham
- Dutchtown

== E ==
- Eagle Center
- Eagle City
- Eagle Point
- Easley
- East Amana
- East Canton
- East Creston
- East Des Moines
- East Iron Hills
- East Monticello
- East Ottumwa
- East Pleasant Plain
- East Rapids
- East Rickardsville
- Easton Place
- Ebys Mill
- Echo
- Eckards
- Eden
- Edenville
- Edinburg
- Edmore
- Edna
- Egralharve
- Ehler
- Eldorado
- Eleanor
- Elk River Junction
- Elkton
- Ellmaker
- Elm Spring
- Elmira
- Elon
- Elrick Junction
- Elvira
- Elwood
- Emeline
- Emery
- Enterprise
- Ericson
- Estates West
- Euclid
- Eureka
- Evander
- Evans
- Evanston
- Eveland
- Ewart
- Exeelsior

== F ==
- Fairport
- Fairview
- Fairville
- Fallow
- Fanslers
- Farlin
- Farrar
- Farson
- Faulkner
- Fern
- Fernald
- Festina
- Fielding
- Fillmore
- Finchford
- Fiscus
- Fisk
- Five Points
- Flagler
- Florence
- Florenceville
- Floyd Crossing
- Folletts
- Folsom
- Forbush
- Ford
- Forestville
- Forsyth
- Fort Des Moines
- Foster
- Frankville
- Frederic
- Fredsville
- Freeman
- Freeport
- Frith Spur
- Froelich
- Frytown
- Fulton

== G ==
- Galbraith
- Galesburg
- Galland
- Garden City
- Gardiner
- Garfield
- Garland
- Garretville
- Garry Owen
- Gatesville
- Gaza
- Genoa
- Georgetown
- Gerled
- German Valley
- Germantown
- Germanville
- Giard
- Gibbsville
- Gifford
- Gilliatt
- Gilt Edge
- Givin
- Glade
- Gladstone
- Gladwin
- Glasgow
- Glen Ellen
- Glendon
- Goddard
- Golden
- Gonoa Bluff
- Gosport
- Grable
- Grace Hill
- Granite
- Grant City
- Gravel Pit
- Great Oaks
- Green Acres
- Green Brier
- Green Castle
- Green Center
- Green Island (Disincorporated in 1993)
- Green Mountain
- Greenbush
- Gridley
- Griffen
- Gunder
- Guss

== H ==
- Hagerty
- Hale
- Haley
- Halfa
- Hamerville
- Hanford
- Hanley
- Hanna
- Hanover
- Hard Scratch
- Hardin
- Harrisburg
- Harrison
- Hart
- Harvard
- Haskins
- Hastie
- Hauntown
- Haven
- Havre
- Hawley
- Hawleyville
- Hawthorne
- Hayfield
- Hayfield Junction
- Hebron
- Helena
- Henshaw
- Herndon
- Herrold
- Hesper
- Hiattsville
- Hickory Grove
- Hicks
- High Amana
- High Creek
- High Point
- Highland
- Highland Center
- Highland Park
- Highlandville
- Highview
- Hillsdale
- Hilltop
- Hiteman
- Hobarton
- Hocking
- Hodge
- Holbrook
- Holiday Lake
- Holiday Village
- Holly Springs
- Holmes
- Holt
- Homer
- Homestead
- Honey Creek
- Hopeville
- Hoprig
- Horton
- Howardville
- Howe
- Hughs
- Huntington
- Hurley
- Huron
- Hurstville (Disincorporated in 1985)
- Hutchins

== I ==
- Iconium
- Illinois Grove
- Illyria
- Indiana
- Indianapolis
- Indianola Junction
- Ion
- Iowa Center
- Iowa Falls Junction
- Ira
- Ironhills
- Irving
- Irvington
- Island Grove
- Ivester
- Iveyville
- Ivy

== J ==
- Jackson
- Jacksonville
- Jacobs
- James
- Jamestown
- Jamison
- Jay
- Jerico
- Jerome
- Jewell
- Jones Siding
- Jordan
- Jordans Grove
- Jubilee
- Judd
- Julien
- Junction Switch
- Juniata

== K ==
- Kalo
- Kemper
- Kendallville
- Kenfield
- Kennebec
- Kennedy
- Kent (Disincorporated in 2003)
- Kentner
- Kenwood
- Kesley
- Key West
- Kidder
- Kilbourn
- Killduff
- Kimze
- King
- Kingston
- Kline
- Klinger
- Klondike
- Knittel
- Knoke
- Knowlton
- Konigsmark
- Kossuth
- Koszta

== L ==
- La Crew
- Lacelle
- Lacey
- Ladoga
- Lafayette
- Lake Panorama
- Lakeview
- Lakewood
- Lakewood Corner
- Lakewood Park
- Lakonta
- LaMoille
- Langdon
- Langworthy
- Lanscaster
- Lansrud
- Lanyon
- Larland
- Last Chance
- Lattnerville
- Latty
- Lavinia
- Lawn Hill
- Lawrenceburg
- Leando
- Lear
- Lebanon (Van Buren County)
- Lebanon (Sioux County)
- Leeds
- Leslie
- Leverett
- Levey
- Lexington
- Liberty
- Liberty Center
- Lidtke Mill
- Lima
- Lime City
- Linby
- Lincoln Center
- Lindale Manor
- Linn Junction
- Linwood
- Little Cedar
- Little Groves
- Little Turkey
- Littleport (Disincorporated in 2005)
- Littleton
- Lizard
- Loch Burns
- Lockman
- Locust
- Logansport
- Long Point
- Lorah
- Lore
- Loring
- Lotts Creek
- Louisa
- Louise
- Lourdes
- Loveland
- Lovington
- Lowell
- Ludlow
- Lundgren
- Lunsford
- Luray
- Luton
- Lycurgus
- Lyman
- Lyndale
- Lyons

== M ==
- Mackey
- Macy
- Magill
- Maine
- Malone
- Malta
- Mammen
- Manteno
- Maple Hill
- Maple Leaf
- Maple River
- Mapleside
- Marietta
- Mark
- Marquisville
- Marsh
- Martinstown
- Mary Hill
- Maryville
- Mason City Junction
- Massey
- Massillon
- Maud
- Maulsby
- Max
- Maxon
- May City
- McBride
- McGargels Ford
- McGregor Heights
- McNally
- McPaul
- McPherson
- McPherson
- Mederville
- Medora
- Mekee
- Meltonville
- Mercer
- Merrimac
- Meskwaki Settlement
- Metz
- Meyer
- Miami
- Middle Amana
- Middleburg
- Midland
- Midvale
- Midway, Floyd County
- Midway, Johnson County
- Midway, Linn County
- Midway, Woodbury County
- Midway Beach
- Miller
- Millman
- Millnerville
- Millrock
- Mills
- Millville (Disincorporated in 2014)
- Millville Siding
- Mineola
- Miner
- Minerva
- Moingona
- Mona
- Moneek
- Moneta (Disincorporated in 1999)
- Monette
- Moningers
- Monteith
- Monterey
- Montgomery
- Monti
- Montpelier
- Mooar
- Moran
- Morgan
- Morhain
- Morningside
- Morse
- Morton Mills
- Moscow
- Motor
- Mount Carmel
- Mount Clare
- Mount Etna
- Mount Hamill
- Mount Joy
- Mount Lucia
- Mount Sterling (Disincorporated in 2012)
- Mount Union (Disincorporated in 2017)
- Mount Zion
- Munterville
- Murphy

== N ==
- Nahant
- Nanito
- Nansen
- Napier
- Nashville
- Nasset
- Navan
- Neptune
- Neska
- Nevinville
- New Albion
- New Boston
- New Buda
- New Buffalo
- New Dixon
- New Era
- New Haven
- New York
- Newbern
- Newburg (Jasper County)
- Newburg (Poweshiek County)
- Newkirk
- Newport
- Nilesville
- Nira
- Nishna
- Noble
- Nora Junction
- Nordness
- Norris Siding
- North Bellevue
- North Branch
- North Cedar
- North Welton
- Northfield
- Norway Center
- Norwich
- Norwood
- Norwoodville
- Nugent
- Nyman

== O ==
- Oakdale
- Oakfield
- Oakland Mills
- Oakley
- Oakwood
- Oasis
- Olaf
- Old Balltown
- Old Peru
- Old Town
- Old Tripoli
- O'Leary
- Olivet
- Olmitz
- Onawa Junction
- Oneida (Disincorporated in 1994)
- O'Neill
- Ontario
- Oralabor
- Oran
- Orange
- Ord
- Orilla
- Ormanville
- Orson
- Orton
- Ortonville
- Osborne
- Osgood
- Oswalt
- Otis
- Otley
- Otranto
- Ottawa
- Ottawa
- Otter Creek
- Otterville
- Ottumwa Junction
- Ovia
- Owego
- Owen
- Oxford Mills
- Ozark

== P ==
- Pacific City
- Packard
- Page Center
- Palm Grove
- Palmyra
- Panther
- Paralta
- Paris
- Park View
- Parkview Terrace
- Payne
- Pekin
- Peoria
- Percival
- Perkins
- Perlee
- Perry Yard
- Pershing
- Peter
- Petersburg (Delaware County)
- Petersburg (Muscatine County)
- Petersville
- Pettis
- Philby
- Phillips
- Pickering
- Pickwick
- Pierceville
- Pigeon
- Pilot Grove
- Pilot Rock
- Piper
- Pittsburg (Montgomery County)
- Pittsburg (Van Buren County)
- Pitzer
- Plainview (Disincorporated in 1987)
- Plato
- Platteville
- Pleasant Corner
- Pleasant Grove
- Pleasant Grove
- Pleasant Prairie
- Pleasant Valley
- Plessis
- Plymouth Junction
- Polen
- Polk City Junction
- Poplar
- Port Louisa
- Portland
- Potosia
- Potter
- Powersville
- Prairie Grove
- Prairiebell
- Primrose
- Probstei
- Prole
- Prussia
- Purdy

== Q ==
- Quandahl
- Quarry
- Quick
- Quincy

== R ==
- Racine
- Raleigh
- Rands
- Raymar
- Red Line
- Reeceville
- Reeve
- Republic
- Rexfield
- Richard
- Richfield
- Richmond
- Rider
- Ridgeport
- Ridgeview Park
- Ridley
- Ridotto
- Riggs
- Rising Sun
- Ritter
- River Junction
- River Sioux
- Roberts
- Robertson
- Robinson
- Rochester
- Rock Creek
- Rockdale
- Rockton
- Rockville
- Roelyn
- Rogers
- Rogersville
- Rorbeck
- Roscoe
- Rose
- Rosedale
- Roselle
- Roseville
- Ross
- Rosserdale
- Rossville
- Rough Woods Hill
- Roxie
- Rubens Siding
- Rubio
- Ruble
- Rushville
- Rusk
- Rutledge

== S ==
- Salina
- Samoa
- Sand Springs
- Sandusky
- Santiago
- Saratoga
- Sattre
- Saude
- Savannah
- Sawyer
- Saxon
- Saylor
- Saylor Station
- Saylorville
- Schley
- Sciola
- Scotch Grove
- Scotch Ridge
- Scott
- Secor
- Sedan
- Seigel
- Selection
- Selma
- Seneca
- Seney
- Severs
- Sewal
- Sexton
- Shady Grove
- Shady Oak
- Shaffton
- Sharon
- Sharon
- Sharon Center
- Shawondasse
- Sheridan
- Sherman
- Sherton Heights
- Sherwood
- Shipley
- Shunem
- Siam
- Silver Lake
- Sinclair
- Sixmile
- Sixteen
- Skunk River
- Slifer
- Smiths
- Smyrna
- Snefs
- Sollberg
- Solomon
- Somber
- South Amana
- South Augusta
- South Garry Owen
- South Switch Junction
- Spaulding
- Spencers Grove
- Sperry
- Spring Fountain
- Spring Grove
- Spring Valley
- Springdale
- Springhole
- Springwater
- St. Benedict
- St. Joseph
- St. Sebald
- Stacyville Junction
- Stanzel
- State Center Junction
- Stennett
- Sterling
- Steuben
- Stevens
- Stiles
- Stillwell
- Stilson
- Stone City
- Stonega
- Strahan
- Strand
- Streepy
- Stringtown
- Sulphur Springs
- Summerset
- Summit
- Summit
- Summit
- Summitville
- Sun Valley Lake
- Sunbury
- Sunshine
- Sutliff
- Swanton
- Swanwood
- Swedesburg
- Sweetland Center

== T ==
- Taintor
- Talleyrand
- Talmage
- Tara
- Taylor
- Taylorsville
- Teeds Grove
- Temple Hill
- Tenmile
- Tenville
- Terre Haute
- Thirty
- Thomasville
- Thompson Corner
- Thorpe
- Thoten
- Ticonic
- Tileville
- Tilton
- Tioga
- Tipperary
- Titu
- Toddville
- Toeterville
- Toolesboro
- Tracy
- Trenton
- Triboji Beach
- Troy
- Troy Mills
- Turkey River
- Tuskeego
- Twin Lakes
- Twin Springs
- Tyrone

== U ==
- Ulmer
- Union Center
- Union Mills
- Unique
- Updegraff
- Upper South Amana
- Utica

== V ==
- Valdora
- Valley
- Valley Junction
- Van
- Van Buren
- Van Cleve
- Vandalia
- Vanhorn
- Vanmeter
- Vanwert
- Ventura Heights
- Veo
- Vera
- Verdi
- Vernon
- Vernon Springs
- Vernon View
- Viele
- Village Creek
- Vilmar
- Vincennes
- Vinje
- Viola
- Viola Center
- Vista
- Volney
- Voorhies

== W ==
- Wadleigh
- Wald
- Wales
- Wall Lake Station
- Wallace
- Wallin
- Walnut City
- Walnut Grove
- Wanamaker
- Waneta
- Wanetta Corner
- Wapsie
- Ward
- Ware
- Washburn
- Washington Mills
- Washington Prairie
- Waterman
- Watkins
- Watson
- Watterson
- Waubeek
- Waukon Junction
- Waupeton
- Waverly Junction
- Weller
- West Amana
- West Cedar Rapids
- West Grove
- West Iron Hills
- West Le Mars
- West Saint Marys
- West Yards
- Western
- Weston
- Westview
- Wever
- Wheelerwood
- White Cloud
- White Elm
- White Oak
- Whitebreast
- Whittier
- Wichita
- Wick
- Wightman
- Wilke
- Wilkins
- Willard
- Willett
- Williamstown
- Wilmar
- Winchester
- Windham
- Winkelmans
- Wiscotta
- Wise
- Wolf
- Wolf Lake Addition
- Wood
- Woodland
- Woodland Hills
- Woodward
- Worthington Acres
- Wren
- Wright
- Wyman

== X ==
- Xenia, Dallas County
- Xenia, Hardin County

== Y ==
- Yampa
- Yarmouth
- Yellow River
- Yeomans
- York
- York Center
- Yorkshire

== Z ==
- Zaneta
- Zenorsville
- Zero
- Zion
- Zook Spur

== See also ==
- List of census-designated places in Iowa
- List of discontinued cities in Iowa
