= Zaneta =

Zaneta may refer to:

- Zaneta, Iowa, an unincorporated community in Grundy County, Iowa, United States

== People ==
- Żaneta Cwalina-Śliwowska (born 1978), Polish politician
- Žaneta Đukić Perišić (born 1956), Serbian literary scholar and historian
- Żaneta Glanc (born 1983), Polish discus thrower
- Žaneta Jaunzeme-Grende (born 1964), Latvian politician and businesswoman
- Zaneta Mascarenhas (born 1980), Australian politician
- Żaneta Skowrońska (born 1979), Polish dressage rider
- Žaneta Tóthová (born 1984), Slovak handball player
- Zaneta Wyne (born 1990), American retired professional soccer player
