= Fairville =

Fairville may refer to the following places:

- Fairville, New Brunswick, Canada

== United States ==
- Fairville, California, a place in California
- Fairville, Iowa
- Fairville, Louisiana, in St. Mary Parish
- Fairville, Missouri
- Fairville, New York
- Fairville, Pennsylvania
