= Ivester =

Ivester is a surname. Notable people with the surname include:

- Douglas Ivester (born 1947), American businessman
- Sally Ivester, American murder victim
- Tom Ivester (born 1969), American politician

== See also ==
- Ivester, Iowa, an unincorporated community in the US state of Iowa
