= Depew =

Depew may refer to:

== Places ==
United States

- Depew, Iowa, an unincorporated community
- Depew, Missouri, an unincorporated community
- Depew, New York, a village
- Depew, Ohio, an unincorporated community
- Depew, Oklahoma, a town

== People with the surname ==
- Chauncey Depew (1834–1928), American politician and lawyer
- Hap Depew (1887–1940), American cinematographer
- Joseph Depew (1912–1988), American actor and director
- Diezel Depew, Mayor, City of Edgewater, FL
