= Belinda, Iowa =

- Unincorporated community
- Location within Iowa
- Coordinates: 41°08′20″N 93°11′32″W
- Country: United States
- State: Iowa
- County: Lucas
- Time zone: UTC-6 (Central (CST))
  - Summer (DST): UTC-5 (CDT)
- Area code: 712
- GNIS feature ID: 454487

Belinda is an unincorporated community in Lucas County, in the U.S. state of Iowa.

== Geography ==
Belinda is located in Lucas County on Iowa Highway 14. It is in Pleasant Township.

== History ==
Belinda was a rural post office located on the line between sections 7 and 8 of Pleasant Township. Belinda's post office operated from 1858 to 1908. Belinda was also the site of J.E. Wood's General Store, as well as a blacksmith, and a wagon and repair shop.

The Belinda Church was organized in 1849, originally in the home of Hiram Moon; the church membership at that time was 10. The denomination was the Disciples of Christ.

The community's population was 40 in 1890, 44 in 1900, and 25 in 1918.

== See also ==
- Zero, Iowa
