= Page City =

Page City may refer to:

- Page City, Iowa, an extinct hamlet in Page County.
- Page City, Kansas, an unincorporated community in Logan County
- Page City, Missouri, an unincorporated community in Lafayette County
