= Vilmar =

Vilmar may refer to:

- Vilmar, Iowa, unincorporated community in the United States
- August Friedrich Christian Vilmar (1800–1868), German Neo-Lutheran theologian
- Vilmar (footballer) (born 1968), full name Vilmar Barbosa Santos, Brazilian footballer

== See also ==
- Sabia (footballer) (born 1982), full name Vilmar da Cunha Rodrigues, Brazilian footballer
