= Viola Center, Iowa =

Former unincorporated community in United States

- Former Unincorporated community
- Location within Iowa
- Coordinates: 41°48′21″N 94°48′08″W
- Country: United States
- State: Iowa
- County: Audubon
- Elevation: 1,444 ft (440 m)
- Time zone: UTC-6 (Central (CST))
  - Summer (DST): UTC-5 (CDT)
- Area code: 712
- GNIS feature ID: 462582

Viola Center was an unincorporated community in Audubon County, Iowa, in the United States.

Formerly the site of the Viola Center Episcopal Methodist Church, a high school, a post office, a store, and a telephone exchange, Viola Center lost its post office in 1903, its high school in the 1950s, and the telephone company, store, and church. The Viola Center Cemetery remains about 1 mile (1.6 km) north of the former community.

== Geography ==
Viola Center was one mile south of the center of Viola Township, at the junction of County Highway N36 and 140th Street. It was 6 miles (9.7 km) northeast of Ross, Iowa.

== History ==
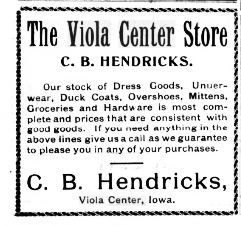
Advertisement for the Viola Center Store, in Viola Center, Audubon County, Iowa

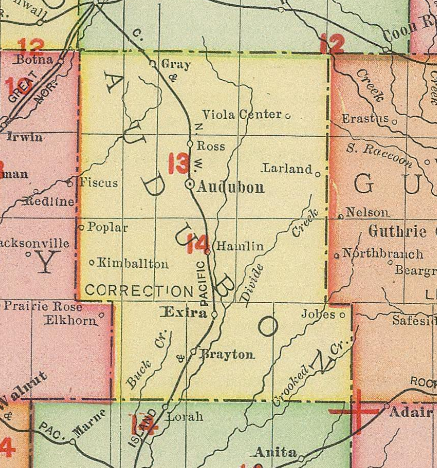
Audubon County, Iowa in 1903, showing the location of Viola Center.

A post office was established in Viola Center on March 6, 1878, and remained in operation until it was discontinued on March 21, 1903. In 1887, Viola Center's population was estimated at 50 residents.

The Viola Center Episcopal Methodist Church was built in 1887; before the building's construction, the congregation gathered locally. The church was home to many community gatherings, including an annual Christmas Tree program; in 1920, the Christmas Tree gathering at the church was "packed to its utmost capacity", according to the newspaper report in nearby Audubon.

In 1900, Viola Center had a store, a church, and a post office. A school was located one mile to the north, and another school, the Morland schoolhouse, one mile south of Viola Center. The church was still present in 1930. The Viola Center High School opened in December 1906. Attendance was estimated at 15–20 students. The high school closed in the 1950s, and was demolished in 2020.

The Coon Rapids and Viola Center Telephone Company operated in Viola Center in the early 1920s, and at that time comprised 11.25 miles (18.11 km) of telephone line.

Viola Center's population was 52 in 1915, and was 69 residents in 1925. The population was 15 in 1940.

Today, Viola Center is nearly empty, and is sometimes considered a ghost town.

The Viola Center Cemetery is located more than a mile north of the townsite, at 41°49'25'N 094°48'07'W.

== See also ==
- Larland, Iowa
