= Iconium, Iowa =

- Unincorporated community in the United States
- Location within Iowa
- Coordinates: 40°53′29″N 92°57′19″W
- Country: United States
- State: Iowa
- County: Appanoose
- Elevation: 994 ft (303 m)
- Time zone: UTC-6 (Central (CST))
  - Summer (DST): UTC-5 (CDT)
- Area code: 641
- GNIS feature ID: 457742

Iconium is an unincorporated community in Appanoose County, Iowa, United States.

== History ==
A post office was established in Iconium in 1853, and remained in operation until it was discontinued in 1903. The community is named after the ancient city of Konya (Latin: Iconium), in Turkey.

The population of Iconium was 132 in 1940.

== See also ==
- Forbush, Iowa
