= Bingham, Iowa =

- Unincorporated community
- Location within Iowa
- Coordinates: 40°44′03″N 95°17′20″W
- Country: United States
- State: Iowa
- County: Page
- Elevation: 1,102 ft (336 m)
- Time zone: UTC-6 (Central (CST))
  - Summer (DST): UTC-5 (CDT)
- Area code: 712
- GNIS feature ID: 454639

Bingham is an unincorporated community in Grant Township, Page County, Iowa, United States. Bingham is located along County Highway M41, 5.1 miles (8.2 km) east-southeast of Shenandoah.

== History ==
Bingham was settled in the late 1870s at the junction of the Wabash Railroad and the West Tarkio River in southern Grant Township. Bingham's population was 22 in 1902, and 75 in 1925. The population was 38 in 1940.
