= Ross Grain Elevator =

- U.S. National Register of Historic Places
- Location within Iowa Location within the United States
- Location: 5940 Main St. Ross, Iowa
- Coordinates: 41°46′25.3″N 94°55′19.6″W
- Area: 1.75 acres (0.71 ha)
- NRHP reference No.: 100002575
- Added to NRHP: June 20, 2018

The Ross Grain Elevator is a historic building located in Ross, Iowa, United States. It was built in 1881 by Charles Stuart, a Civil War veteran who was a forwarding agent for the Chicago and Northwestern Railroad. The wooden structure rests on a limestone foundation. By the early 20th century the elevator was sheathed in corrigated steel to guard against the sparks that came off of the locomotives at the nearby depot, no longer extant. The elevator is made up of three interconnected buildings that include the elevator itself, an annex, and the brick scale-engine house. At one time the property contained two grain elevators, a depot, stock yards, cob houses, town dump, coal shed and other related structures. The railroad discontinued operations here in the 1940s, and the other buildings were removed over the years. The elevator itself was used on a farm into the 1970s. It has not been used since then, but its internal mechanisms are still extant. The elevator was listed on the National Register of Historic Places in 2018.
