= Churchville, Iowa =

- unincorporated community
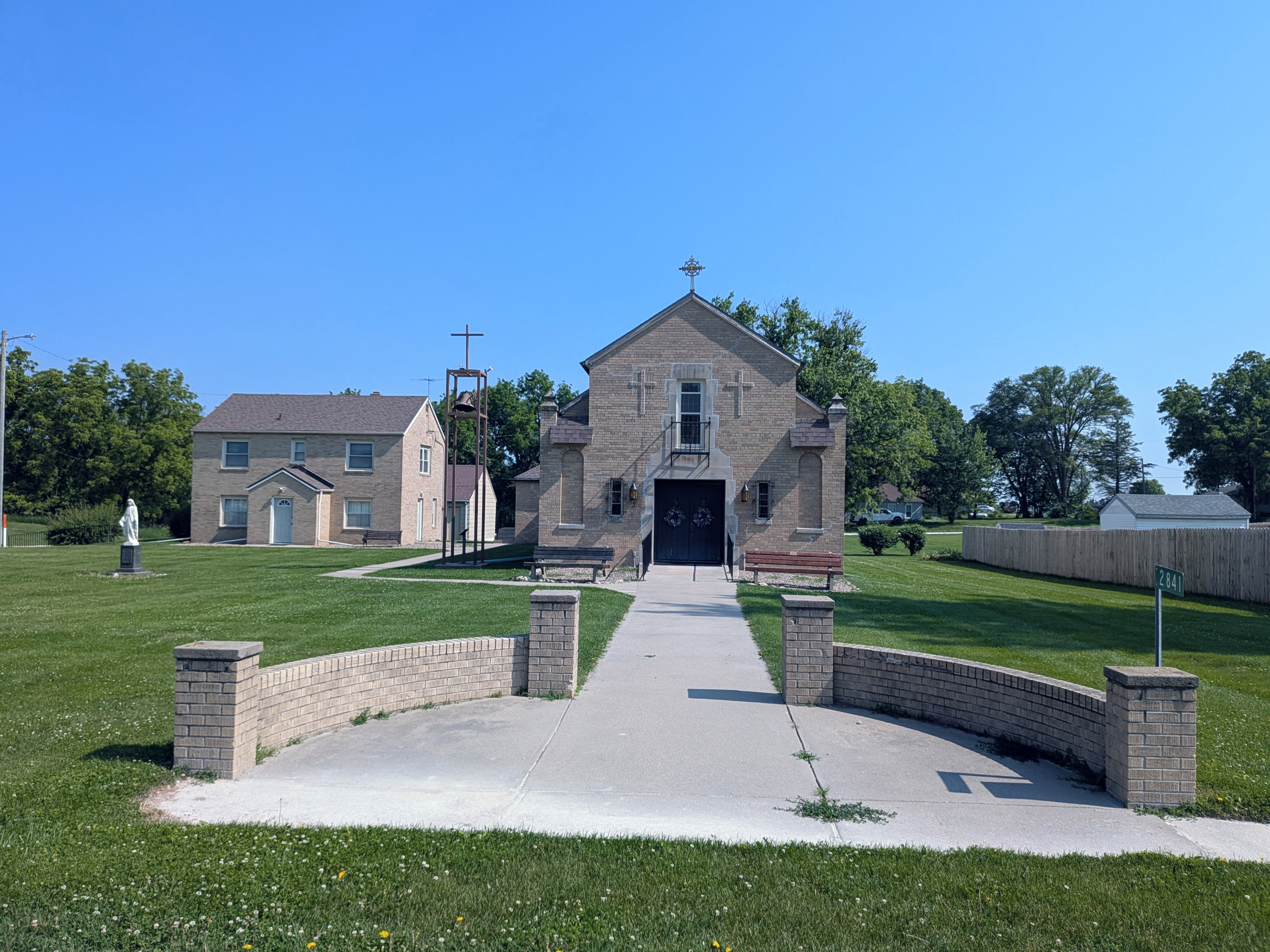
- Shrine of the Assumption Catholic Church in Churchville

- Location within the state of Iowa Churchville, Iowa (the United States)
- Country: United States
- State: Iowa
- County: Warren County
- Surveyed: 1854
- Founder: John Churchman
- Elevation: 971 ft (296 m)
- Time zone: UTC-6 (Central (CST))
  - Summer (DST): UTC-5 (CDT)
- Postal code: 50211
- Area code: 515
- GNIS feature ID: 455413

Churchville is an unincorporated community in Warren County, Iowa, United States.

== Geography ==
Churchville is located in Jefferson Township at the intersection of Churchville Street and 30th Avenue. It is 1.5 miles (2.4 km) southwest of Prole and two miles (3.2 km) north of Martensdale at an altitude of 971 feet (296 m).

== History ==
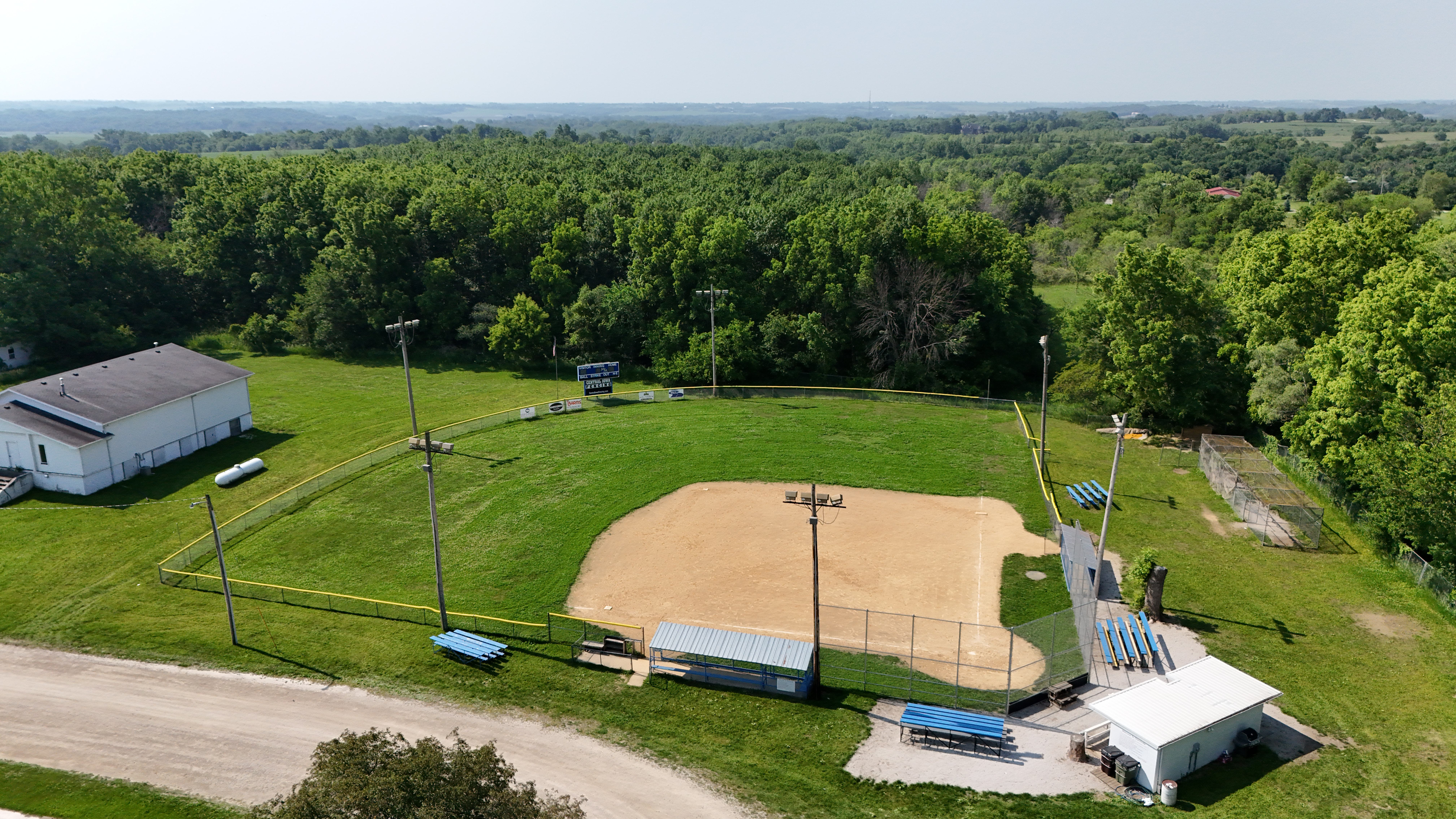
The Little League Baseball field in Churchville

Churchville was founded by John Churchman in 1854.

The Church of the Assumption, a Catholic church, was constructed in 1859 under the Archdiocese of Dubuque. The building, the oldest Catholic church in the county, was destroyed in a fire in March 1933 and rebuilt soon afterward. Calvary Cemetery, which dates from at least 1854, has been associated with the Church of the Assumption and is located about a mile west of the community. The last regular mass for the parish (established in 1890) was August 28, 2014. Parishioners were asked by the Des Moines Diocese to move to a larger parish. The building will continue to serve as a shrine where mass may be celebrated once a month and on special occasions.

A rail line was established at Churchville by the late 1800s. Churchville's population was 62 in 1902. The town won two complaints (1917 and 1920) against Chicago Great Western Railroad for repair of the local stock yards for shipping animals to market.

Rail service to Churchville was discontinued in July 1921. Churchville's population was 80 in 1925. The population was 75 in 1940.

== Notable residents ==
- Adam Walsh (1901–1985) American football player and coach

== See also ==
- Prole, Iowa
