= Bailey, Iowa =

Former community in Iowa

- Unincorporated community
- Location within Iowa Location within the United States
- Coordinates: 43°27′54″N 92°36′29″W
- Country: United States
- State: Iowa
- County: Mitchell
- Founded: November 26, 1886
- Incorporated: 1901
- Dissolved: 1928
- Elevation: 1,283 ft (391 m)
- Time zone: UTC-6 (Central (CST))
  - Summer (DST): UTC-5 (CDT)
- Area code: 641
- GNIS feature ID: 464454

Bailey was a community in Wayne Township, Mitchell County, Iowa, United States. Founded in 1886 as a whistle stop, it was briefly known as Wapsie. The community lay north of the Wapsipinicon River.

The town of Bailey's population peaked in the early 1900s. Bailey was an incorporated town from 1901 to 1928, but residents voted to dissolve the incorporation. Following the closure of the municipal government, post office, rail station, schools, and businesses, Bailey still appears on maps of Mitchell County, but only a few farms mark the area today. A shared use nature trail lies at the eastern edge of Bailey.

== History ==
=== 1800s ===
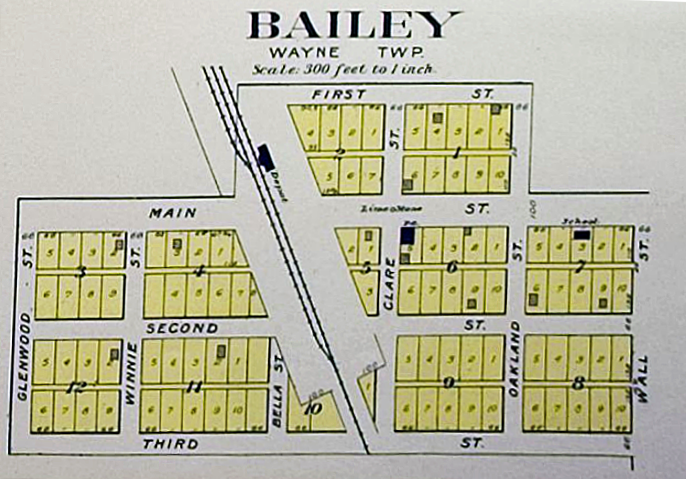
The plat map of Bailey showed the grid of planned roads.

The first white person in Section 23 of Wayne Township was John Bailey, who settled there in summer 1855, and who lived there until his 1882 death. In 1856, a number of other settlers arrived; they settled the area which would eventually become Bailey. This included Ed Proctor, Isaac Carter, Mosses Page, and Leroy Foot. Mr Foot opened the first store in the township, in a rough cabin with no floor, in Section 21; the store carried "a small stock of groceries, tobacco and whiskey". This store only lasted a few months before relocating out of the Bailey area, and moving to the southern part of Wayne Township. Religious services around that time were held in the home of Foot, beginning in spring 1856, with Reverend Holbrook, a Methodist minister, presiding. A post office called Wapsie was established in Section 22 in January 1883, but was discontinued in 1887.

Bailey was platted on November 26, 1886, by Isaac Carter and J. Austin Bailey, following construction of the Winona and Southwestern Railroad (later part of the Chicago Great Western Railway) through the area. The town plat, in Section 22 of Wayne Township, divided the community into a grid of twelve blocks, with the rail line running diagonally northwest–southeast. The north–south streets were named Glenwood, Winnie, Bella, Clare, Oakland, and Wall, while the east–west streets were named (or numbered) First, Main, Second, and Third.

The Bailey post office, historically the second post office in Section 22 of the township, was established on March 10, 1887. Bailey's population was 50 residents that year.

=== Early 1900s ===
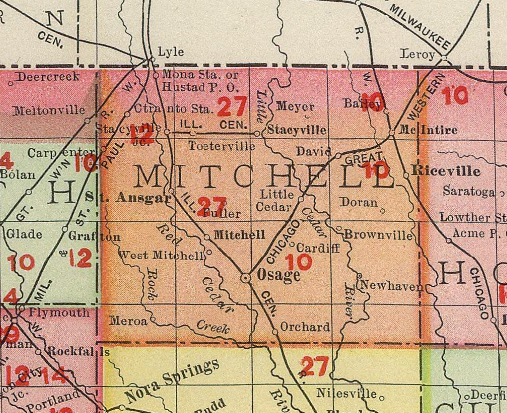
Bailey in Mitchell County, Iowa, in 1903

Bailey became an incorporated town in 1901. In the early 1900s, the community included a bakery and grocery, an apiarist, and a dry goods store, in addition to the post office, school, and the rail station. The population of Bailey was 42 in 1902. In 1911, the county atlas showed 15 buildings in the platted part of the community, including the school, railroad depot, and post office along Main Street. After incorporation, Bailey's population steadily grew, and was estimated at 225 in 1918; the population of the town was 209 in 1925. These were Bailey's peak years. A 1918 history of Mitchell County stated, "A rivalry between this village and McIntire has hindered the substantial growth of both."

=== Decline ===
In 1928, the incorporated town of Bailey was officially dissolved; newspapers reported that residents had scheduled a vote to return jurisdiction to the county over the issue of the graveling of two roads within the town's limits. Residents balked at this expenditure, and Bailey returned to unincorporated community status.

Bailey historical population
Year	Pop.	±%
1887	50	—
1900	42	−16.0%
1910	225	+435.7%
1920	209	−7.1%
1940	50	−76.1%
1950	N/A	—
Source: U.S. Decennial Census, Cram's Modern Atlas

The community gradually eroded as the residents left for other communities. One loss was the post office. Open since 1887, Bailey's post office closed on January 31, 1940. That year, Bailey's population was 50, less than one fourth of its peak population.

It was reported in April 1944 that enrollment at the Bailey School was just six students; the Bailey School was merged with the nearby Wayne Township School #1 in Autumn 1944, and it was estimated that combined enrollment (to be held at the Bailey School) would be 15–20 students. It was hoped that the merger would provide a solution to the lack of teachers in the rural area.

A new Bailey School was dedicated on November 29, 1951. The school featured two large classrooms, a basement gymnasium/auditorium, and indoor bathrooms. The building narrowly escaped destruction shortly before its opening when a fire was discovered by a teacher; the fire was extinguished by fire brigades from Riceville, McIntire, and LeRoy, Minnesota, with minimal damage to the school.

By 1961, the Bailey School was only being used for students from kindergarten through second grade; a November 1961 proposal would move students to a new combined K-12 building in nearby Riceville. The Bailey School was open as late as spring 1962.

In 1965, The Chicago Great Western Railway, the rail line which had passed through Bailey for over 75 years, ended passenger service. The rail line was removed in 1982, and the line became the Wapsi-Great Western Line (WGWL) Trail; the northern branch of this shared use nature trail goes north from Riceville to the Minnesota border. There is a picnic area where the trail reaches Bailey.

Little remains today of Bailey aside from nearby farms, and the site is commonly referred to as a ghost town. Two natural areas, the Wapsi River Wildlife Area and the Pinicon Alders Wildlife Area, are adjacent to Bailey.

== Geography ==
Bailey was located in the northern portion of Mitchell County along the Chicago Great Western Railway, in Wayne Township. It was near the junction of County Highway A19 (also known as Bailey Street, or 485th Street) and Valley Avenue, and still appears on Iowa Department of Transportation maps. The community was just north of the Wapsipinicon River, a 300 mi (480 km) long tributary of the Mississippi River.

== See also ==
- List of unincorporated communities in Iowa
