= Juniata, Iowa =

- ghost town
- Location within Iowa
- Coordinates: 42°34′48.93″N 95°08′52.98″W
- Country: United States
- State: Iowa
- County: Buena Vista
- Elevation: 1,385 ft (422 m)
- Time zone: UTC-6 (Central (CST))
  - Summer (DST): UTC-5 (CDT)
- Area code: 712
- GNIS feature ID: 464599

Juniata was an unincorporated community in Buena Vista County, located in the U.S. state of Iowa.

== Geography ==
Juniata was south of Outlet Creek, on U.S. Highway 71.

== History ==
Juniata was originally called Northam, but the name was changed due to a supposed similarity between Northam and Marathon. The name of the community was pronounced "Ju-ne-at-ta," according to a 1909 source.

The community was founded alongside the Milwaukee Road. The still-new community was described in 1914: "The town of Juniata is surrounded by large and productive farms. A general store is needed, also a stock buyer, a meat market, butter and egg store, a boarding house and a bank."

Juniata was built diagonally along the rail line. The community was platted by P.H. Toohey and by 1908, boasted a Methodist Episcopal church.

Juniata's population was 11 in 1915, and was 10 in 1940.

Outlet Creek, just north of Juniata and west of Newell, is noted for its catfish, bullheads, and crappie.

== See also ==
- List of unincorporated communities in Iowa
