= Lizard, Iowa =

- former unincorporated community
- Location within Iowa
- Coordinates: 42°38′05″N 94°30′40″W
- Country: United States
- State: Iowa
- County: Pocahontas
- Elevation: 1,197 ft (365 m)
- Time zone: UTC-6 (Central (CST))
  - Summer (DST): UTC-5 (CDT)
- GNIS feature ID: 464100

Lizard is a former unincorporated community in Pocahontas County, in the U.S. state of Iowa.

Lizard was first settled in 1857 and acquired a school district in 1860. A post office was established in 1868 and a Catholic church in 1871. The post office closed in 1902 and the church in 1984.

The community was briefly known as Buda.

== Geography ==
The community was on County Road C66 near the junction of 320th Avenue.

== History ==
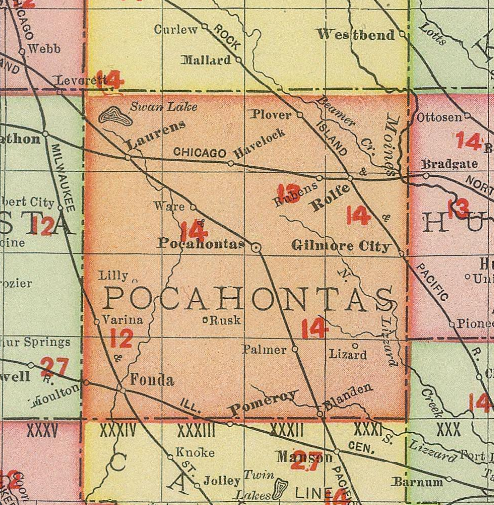
Lizard was located in the southeastern part of Pocahontas County, Iowa.

Lizard was founded in Lizard Township, and takes its name from nearby Lizard Creek. Lizard was one of the earliest settlements in Pocahontas County, with John Quinlan and his family being the first to settle there in 1857. Early religious services took place in the homes of Patrick Forey and James T. White. In 1858, according to The Pioneer History of Pocahontas County, Iowa, "a few more settlers came to the Lizard settlement".

The Lizard School District was formed in 1860.

The Lizard post office was established in December 1868, was renamed Buda in 1872, was returned to the name Lizard in 1875, was discontinued in 1884, was reestablished in 1891, and was discontinued in 1902, with the establishment of Rural Free Delivery.

A number of other businesses and organizations were also located in Lizard. A store and inn, first owned by Garret Shoonmaker, operated in the 1880s; for a number of years, the post office was also located here.

The Lizard Catholic Church was dedicated on July 6, 1871. It was renamed St. Patrick on the Lizard Catholic Church. The building was replaced in 1930; the church observed its centennial on September 17, 1972, and closed in 1984.

Gradually, Lizard declined as a settlement. Lizard's population was just 6 residents in 1915.

== See also ==
- Rubens, Iowa
- Ware, Iowa
