= Hardin B. Cloud =

American politician

Hardin B. Cloud (May 5, 1850 – April 11, 1901) was an American farmer, merchant, and businessman.

Born in Girard, Illinois, Cloud moved to Iowa in 1870. Cloud was a farmer and livestock dealer. He also was a merchant and postmaster for the community of Cloud, Iowa. From 1884 to 1886, Cloud served in the Iowa House of Representatives on the Greenback-Democrat ticket. Cloud died suddenly while staying in a hotel in Chariton, Iowa; he had been in ill-health.
