= Wapsie, Iowa =

- unincorporated community
- Location within Iowa
- Coordinates: 42°42′54″N 92°11′58″W
- Country: United States
- State: Iowa
- County: Bremer
- Elevation: 1,030 ft (310 m)
- Time zone: UTC-6 (Central (CST))
  - Summer (DST): UTC-5 (CDT)
- GNIS feature ID: 464111

Wapsie is an unincorporated community in Franklin Township in Bremer County, Iowa, United States.

== Geography ==
Wapsi is in section 6 of Franklin Township. It is at the junction of Sable Avenue and Iowa Highway 3 (230th Street).

== History ==
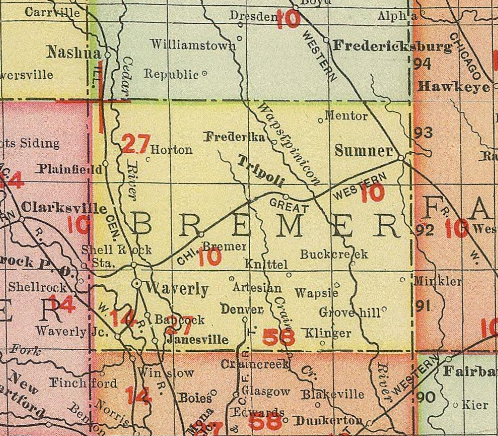
Wapsie in Bremer County, Iowa, in 1903

Wapsie was founded one mile west of the banks of the Wapsipinicon River. The Wapsie post office opened on October 10, 1890, and closed on January 14, 1905.

Wapsie's population was 25 in 1887, was 27 in 1902, and was 21 in 1917.

The community of Wapsie in Bremer County is not to be confused with the town of Bailey, formerly known as Wapsie, in Mitchell County; both communities were near the Wapsipinicon River, but in different parts of the state. Wapsie has also been spelled Wapsi.
