= Girard, Illinois =

- City
- Location in Macoupin County, Illinois
- Coordinates: 39°26′48″N 89°46′55″W
- Country: United States
- State: Illinois
- County: Macoupin
- Township: Girard

Area
  - Total: 0.93 sq mi (2.42 km^{2})
  - Land: 0.93 sq mi (2.42 km^{2})
  - Water: 0 sq mi (0.00 km^{2})
- Elevation: 669 ft (204 m)

Population (2020)
  - Total: 1,785
  - Density: 1,911.2/sq mi (737.91/km^{2})
- Time zone: UTC-6 (CST)
  - Summer (DST): UTC-5 (CDT)
- ZIP code: 62640
- Area code(s): 217, 447
- FIPS code: 17-29392
- GNIS feature ID: 2394904

Girard is a city in Macoupin County, Illinois, United States. The population was 1,785 at the 2020 census, down from 2,103 in 2010.

== History ==
Girard is named for Stephen Girard. When the village incorporated as a city, it became politically separate from Girard Township which surrounded it.

== Geography ==
Girard is located in northeastern Macoupin County. Illinois Route 4 passes through the center of town as Third Street, leading southwest 14 miles (23 km) to Carlinville, the county seat, and north-northeast 26 miles (42 km) to Springfield, the state capital.

According to the U.S. Census Bureau, Girard has a total area of 0.93 square miles (2.41 km^{2}), all land. The city drains west to tributaries of the East Fork of Otter Creek, flowing southwest to Hodges and then Macoupin Creek, a west-flowing tributary of the Illinois River. Sunset Lake and Otter Lake are 4 and 6 miles (6 and 10 km) west of Girard, respectively.

== Demographics ==
Historical population
| Census | Pop. | Note | %± |
|---|---|---|---|
| 1880 | 1,024 | | — |
| 1890 | 1,524 | | 48.8% |
| 1900 | 1,661 | | 9.0% |
| 1910 | 1,891 | | 13.8% |
| 1920 | 2,387 | | 26.2% |
| 1930 | 1,760 | | −26.3% |
| 1940 | 1,741 | | −1.1% |
| 1950 | 1,740 | | −0.1% |
| 1960 | 1,734 | | −0.3% |
| 1970 | 1,881 | | 8.5% |
| 1980 | 2,246 | | 19.4% |
| 1990 | 2,164 | | −3.7% |
| 2000 | 2,245 | | 3.7% |
| 2010 | 2,103 | | −6.3% |
| 2020 | 1,785 | | −15.1% |
U.S. Decennial Census

=== 2020 census ===
As of the 2020 census, Girard had a population of 1,785. The median age was 40.9 years. 22.9% of residents were under the age of 18 and 19.3% of residents were 65 years of age or older. For every 100 females, there were 93.2 males, and for every 100 females age 18 and over, there were 92.1 males.

0.0% of residents lived in urban areas, while 100.0% lived in rural areas.

There were 755 households in Girard, of which 27.4% had children under the age of 18 living in them. Of all households, 40.7% were married-couple households, 20.7% were households with a male householder and no spouse or partner present, and 28.6% were households with a female householder and no spouse or partner present. About 32.5% of all households were made up of individuals, and 16.7% had someone living alone who was 65 years of age or older.

There were 899 housing units, of which 16.0% were vacant. The homeowner vacancy rate was 2.1% and the rental vacancy rate was 15.0%.

Racial composition as of the 2020 census
| Race | Number | Percent |
|---|---|---|
| White | 1,647 | 92.3% |
| Black or African American | 10 | 0.6% |
| American Indian and Alaska Native | 8 | 0.4% |
| Asian | 4 | 0.2% |
| Native Hawaiian and Other Pacific Islander | 0 | 0.0% |
| Some other race | 2 | 0.1% |
| Two or more races | 114 | 6.4% |
| Hispanic or Latino (of any race) | 29 | 1.6% |

=== 2000 census ===
As of the 2000 census, there were 2,245 people, 864 households, and 565 families living in the city. The population density was 2,398.9 inhabitants per square mile (926.2/km^{2}). There were 926 housing units at an average density of 989.5 per square mile (382.0/km^{2}). The racial makeup of the city was 98.93% White, 0.13% African American, 0.13% Native American, 0.04% Asian, 0.09% from other races, and 0.67% from two or more races. Hispanic or Latino of any race were 1.11% of the population.

There were 864 households, out of which 34.0% had children under the age of 18 living with them, 48.0% were married couples living together, 12.4% had a female householder with no husband present, and 34.6% were non-families. 28.7% of all households were made up of individuals, and 15.2% had someone living alone who was 65 years of age or older. The average household size was 2.49 and the average family size was 3.07.

In the city, the population was spread out, with 26.5% under the age of 18, 8.5% from 18 to 24, 28.6% from 25 to 44, 19.3% from 45 to 64, and 17.1% who were 65 years of age or older. The median age was 36 years. For every 100 females, there were 94.0 males. For every 100 females age 18 and over, there were 87.5 males.

The median income for a household in the city was $31,806, and the median income for a family was $39,028. Males had a median income of $29,537 versus $22,266 for females. The per capita income for the city was $15,090. About 10.2% of families and 13.2% of the population were below the poverty line, including 19.8% of those under age 18 and 9.7% of those age 65 or over.

== Recreation ==
Girard is located at the south end of the Sangamon Valley Trail right-of-way.

== Notable people ==
- Hardin B. Cloud, farmer, merchant, and Iowa state legislator; born in Girard
- Charlotte Pierce, silent film actress; born in Girard
- Fountain L. Thompson, U.S. senator for North Dakota in early 20th Century; raised in Girard
