= Oakley, Iowa =

- Unincorporated community
- Location within Iowa Location within the United States
- Coordinates: 41°06′04″N 93°21′55″W
- Country: United States
- State: Iowa
- County: Lucas
- Township: Liberty
- Elevation: 978 ft (298 m)
- Time zone: UTC-6 (Central (CST))
  - Summer (DST): UTC-5 (CDT)
- Area code: 641
- GNIS feature ID: 459774

Oakley is an unincorporated community in Liberty Township, Lucas County, Iowa, United States. Oakley is located along county highways H20 and S23,6.2 miles (10.0 km) north-northwest of Chariton.

== History ==
Founded in the 1800s, Oakley's population was 70 in 1902. The population was 50 in 1940.
