= Attica, Iowa =

- Unincorporated community
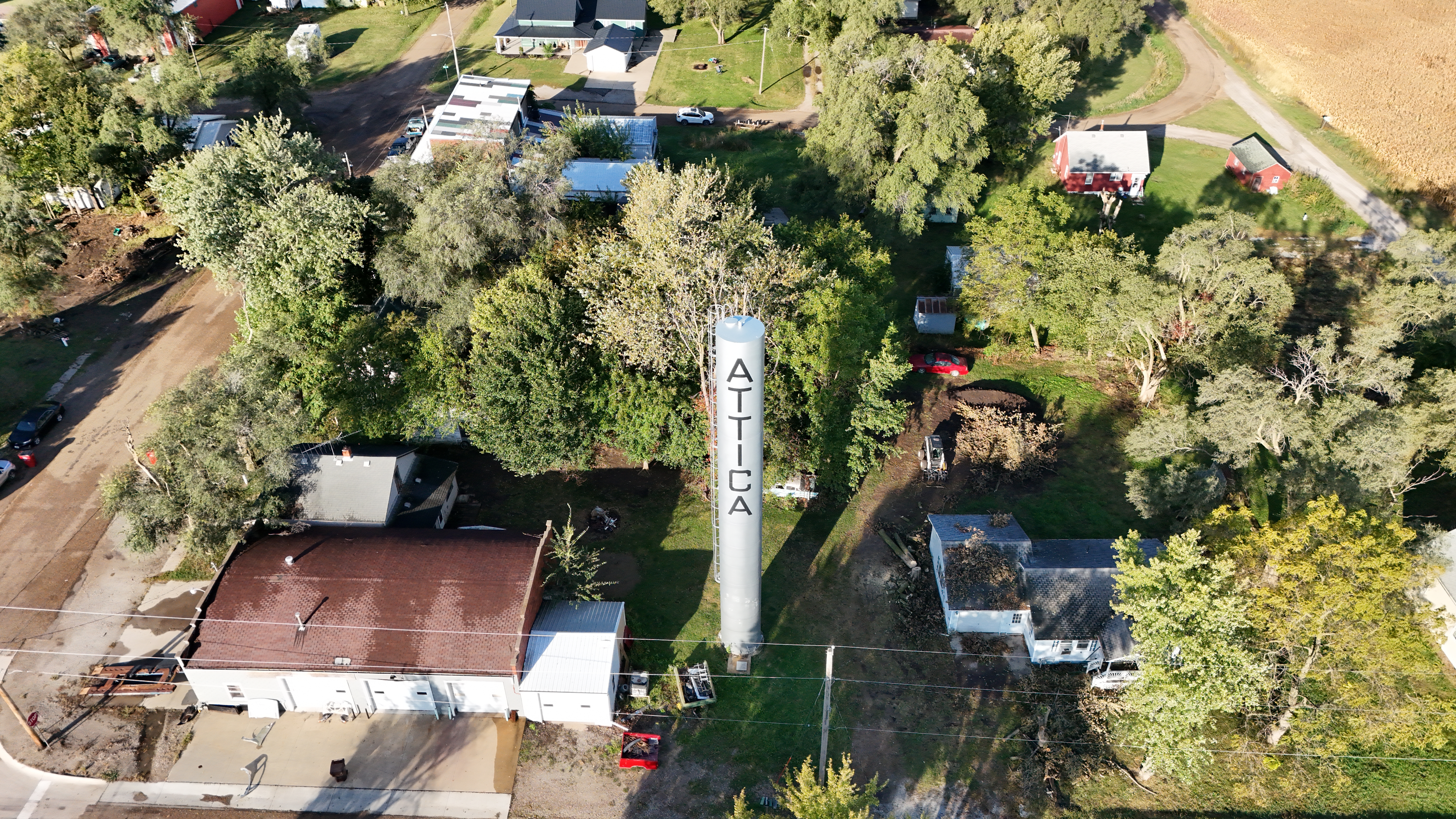
- Attica's Water Tower

- Location within Iowa Location within the United States
- Coordinates: 41°13′47″N 93°00′58″W
- Country: United States
- State: Iowa
- County: Marion
- Elevation: 919 ft (280 m)

Population (United States Census)
  - Total: no official census count
- Time zone: UTC-6 (Central (CST))
  - Summer (DST): UTC-5 (CDT)
- GNIS feature ID: 454277

Attica is an unincorporated community in Marion County, Iowa, United States.

== Geography ==
It lies approximately 6 mi (9.7 km) south of Knoxville on Iowa Highway 5. A notable landmark around the area is the Hammond Covered Bridge located south of town off of Highway G-76 on 170th.

== History ==
The community is one of the oldest in the county, and was platted by the county surveyor Stanford Doud on May 16, 1847, for James Barker and Nathaniel and Rhoda Cockelreas. The plat was filed under the name Barkersville, in honor of one of the founders, James Barker. The first home and business were owned by Barker, and he also served as the first postmaster.

On December 28, 1852, he name was changed from Barkersville to Attica after a petition was circulated to change the name of the community. The Iowa Legislature passed a bill entitled "An act to change the name of Barkersville in Marion County to Attica." At that time, there was also a school and a hotel.

In 1914, there was a post office, three general stores, and the hotel; the population was 125. The population was 130 in 1940.

== See also ==
- Cloud, Iowa
