= Miodrag Perišić =

Serbian writer, literary critic and politician

- Миодраг Перишић
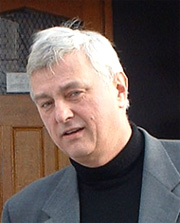
- Perišić in January 2003

Minister of Information of FR Yugoslavia
- In office 14 July 1992 – 2 March 1993
- Preceded by: Position established
- Succeeded by: Slobodan Ignjatović

Personal details
- Born: 31 July 1948 Subotica, PR Serbia, FPR Yugoslavia
- Died: 6 May 2003 (aged 54) Ottawa, Ontario, Canada
- Resting place: Belgrade New Cemetery
- Party: Democratic Party
- Spouse: Žaneta Đukić Perišić
- Profession: Author, politician

Miodrag Perišić (Serbian Cyrillic: Миодраг Перишић; 31 July 1948 – 6 May 2003) was a Serbian writer, literary critic and politician.

He was one of the founders and a vice-president of the Serbian modern-day Democratic Party, the first Minister of Information of the Federal Republic of Yugoslavia and the country's ambassador to Canada from 2001 until his death in May 2003.

== Biography ==
Although born in Subotica, Perišić completed primary and secondary school education in Belgrade. He received a BA degree in philosophy at Belgrade University's faculty of arts and sciences, department of philosophy. During his studies he participated in editing and publishing of the journals Student and Vidici, and later worked as editor of the journal Književna reč (Literary Word). Perišić freelanced until 1978 when he started to work as secretary of the Ivo Andrić Foundation in Belgrade until 1984. From 1984 to 1992 he was editor-in-chief of the journal, Književne novine (Literary Gazette). He was an active member in the Serbian PEN Centre and a vice president of the International PEN, the worldwide association of writers.

In fall 1991, Perišić was a guest of the Hoover Institution on War, Revolution and Peace at the University of Stanford (California). In fall and winter 1991-92 he was a guest at several universities in United States and gave lectures about roots of Yugoslav crisis, role of the intellectuals, and causes of SFR Yugoslavia's disintegration. In November and December 1999, he visited the John F. Kennedy School of Government and gave lectures at William Howard Taft University.

Perišić authored several books, and published anthology of modern Serbian poetry. His latest book was Razvaline ideološkog raja (The Ruins of Ideological Paradise), published in 1995.

== Political career ==
With a group of like-minded activists, including Zoran Đinđić and Vojislav Koštunica, Perišić re-established the Democratic Party in Serbia in 1989. In summer 1992 he was elected as a member of the first Federal Government of the Federal Republic of Yugoslavia as the Minister of Information in the Cabinet of Milan Panić. In the same year, he was elected as the Democratic Party representative in the Federal Parliament. From 1994 to 2000 he was a Vice President of the Democratic Party, and in the period from 1996 to 2000 he was a federal representative elected by the Coalition "Zajedno" ("Together").

Perišić co-founded the Council for Democratic Changes in Serbia, a non-governmental organization where he was the president of the Political Committee until December 2000. On 5 October 2000, he was among the citizens who welcomed the overthrow of Slobodan Milošević on the stairway of the Federal Parliament building. He was appointed an Ambassador of FR Yugoslavia in Ottawa, Canada in 2001, where he was highly appreciated by the Serbian immigration, working steadily on greater interconnectedness of the diaspora and its integration into political and social life of Serbia and Montenegro.

Former Foreign Minister Goran Svilanović emphasized that Perišić "with his dignity of an intellectual, had opened many doors which for others had been closed, in such a way succeeding to bring one small country, as it is Serbia and Montenegro, into the society of the great".

== Family ==
He was married to the former Žaneta Đukić; the couple had twin daughters.

== Death ==
Perišić died of a heart attack on a treadmill during a workout at the University of Ottawa, one month short of his two-year mandate. He was 54 years old. He is interred in the Belgrade New Cemetery.
