= Ladoga, Iowa =

- Extinct Hamlet
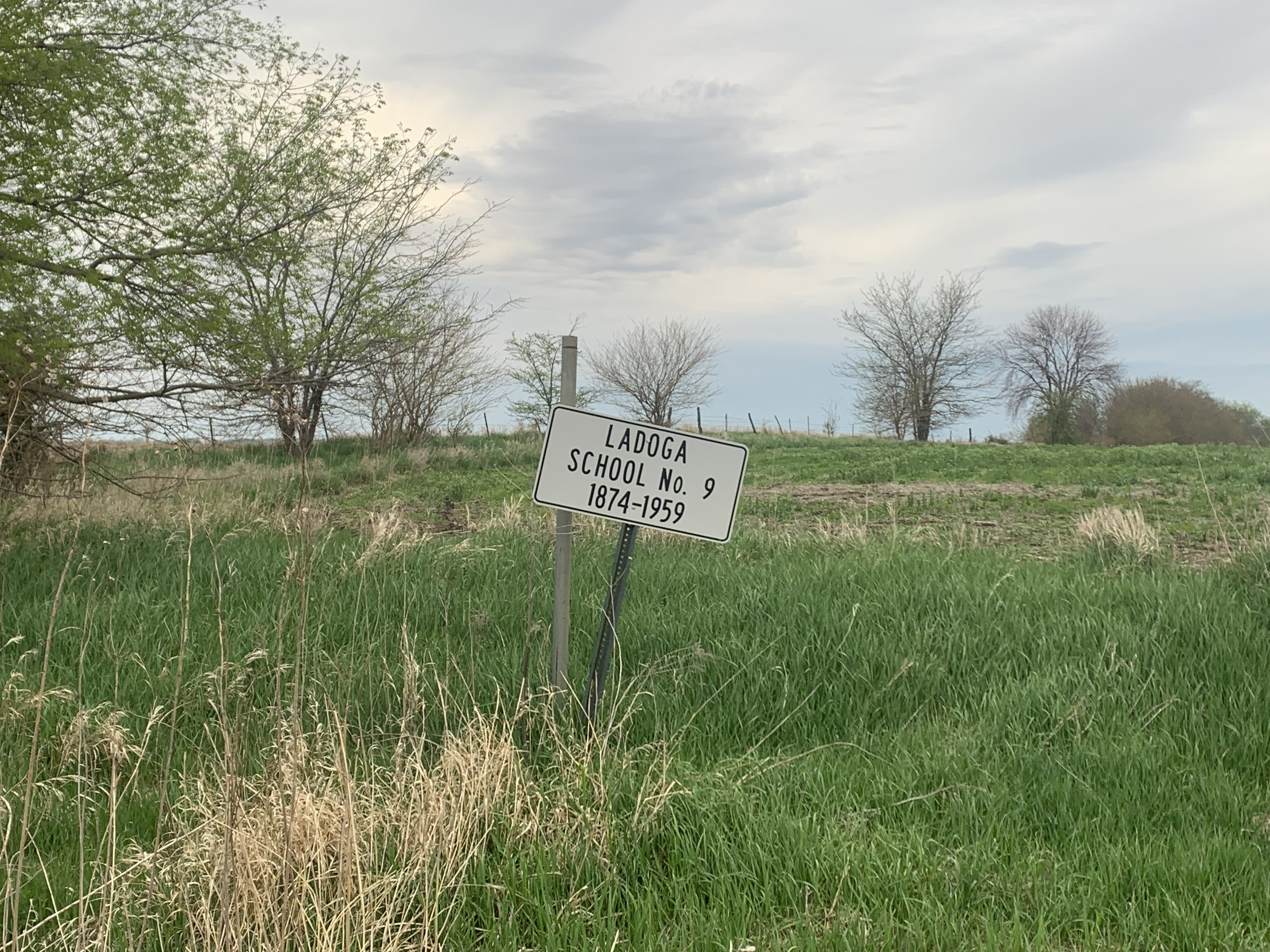
- Site of Ladoga School No. 9 southwest of Gravity, Iowa

- Location within Iowa
- Coordinates: 40°44′30″N 94°47′43″W
- Country: United States
- State: Iowa
- County: Taylor
- Elevation: 1,220 ft (370 m)
- Time zone: UTC-6 (Central (CST))
  - Summer (DST): UTC-5 (CDT)
- Area code: 712
- GNIS feature ID: 464606

Ladoga is an extinct hamlet in Washington Township, Taylor County, Iowa, United States. Ladoga is located along County Route J35, 3 miles (4.8 km) west-southwest of Gravity.

== History ==
Ladoga's population was just 8 in 1902, and 15 in 1925. The population was 3 in 1940. There is nothing remaining from Ladoga besides a sign marking where the school was.
