= Bard, Iowa =

- unincorporated community
- Location within Iowa
- Coordinates: 41°14′25″N 91°17′15″W
- Country: United States
- State: Iowa
- County: Louisa County
- Elevation: 604 ft (184 m)
- Time zone: UTC-6 (Central (CST))
  - Summer (DST): UTC-5 (CDT)
- GNIS feature ID: 464282

Bard was an unincorporated community in Louisa County, in the U.S. state of Iowa.

== Geography ==
Bard was located at 41°14′25″N 91°17′15″W.

== History ==
The Cedar Rapids and Burlington Railway Company built a rail line through the Louisa County communities of Morning Sun, Wapello, Bard, and Columbus Junction circa 1869.

Bard became one of 17 villages in the county, with Louisa County historian Arthur Springer in 1912 writing, "The county now has Wapello, Columbus Junction, Morning Sun, Columbus City, Oakville, Grandview, Lettsville, Cotter or Cotterville, Wyman, Cairo, Fredonia, Elrick Junction, Toolsboro, Marsh, Gladwin, Newport and Bard, being seventeen in all." The Bard post office began operations in 1876.

The community's population was 25 in 1890.

The Bard post office closed in 1901.

On April 27, 1929, a tornado hit the Bard area. The tornado damaged a swath of land two miles long and 220 yards wide, causing $2,100 in damages.

Bard's population was 15 in 1940.

== See also ==
Toolesboro, Iowa
