= Nansen, Iowa =

- Former unincorporated community
- Location within Iowa
- Coordinates: 43°06′43″N 92°14′16″W
- Country: United States
- State: Iowa
- County: Chickasaw County
- Time zone: UTC-6 (Central (CST))
  - Summer (DST): UTC-5 (CDT)

Nansen was an unincorporated community in Chickasaw County, Iowa, United States. It was at the junction of 170th Street and Pembroke Avenue.

== History ==
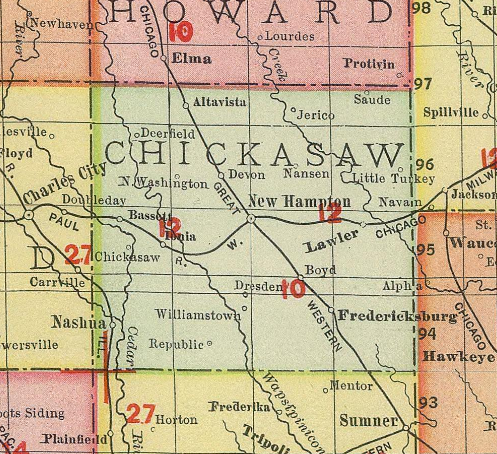
Nansen in Chickasaw County, Iowa, in 1903

Nansen was established in Section 10 of Jacksonville Township, (Note: The name was misspelled as Mansen in the 1930 Annals of Iowa publication; this was noted and corrected in the 1931 edition.) a few miles northeast of the county seat of New Hampton.

Nansen's post office operated from 1897 to 1904. The community's population was 22 in 1902.

Nansen was noted in a 1932 article about Chickasaw County's lost villages.
