= Sewal, Iowa =

- Unincorporated community
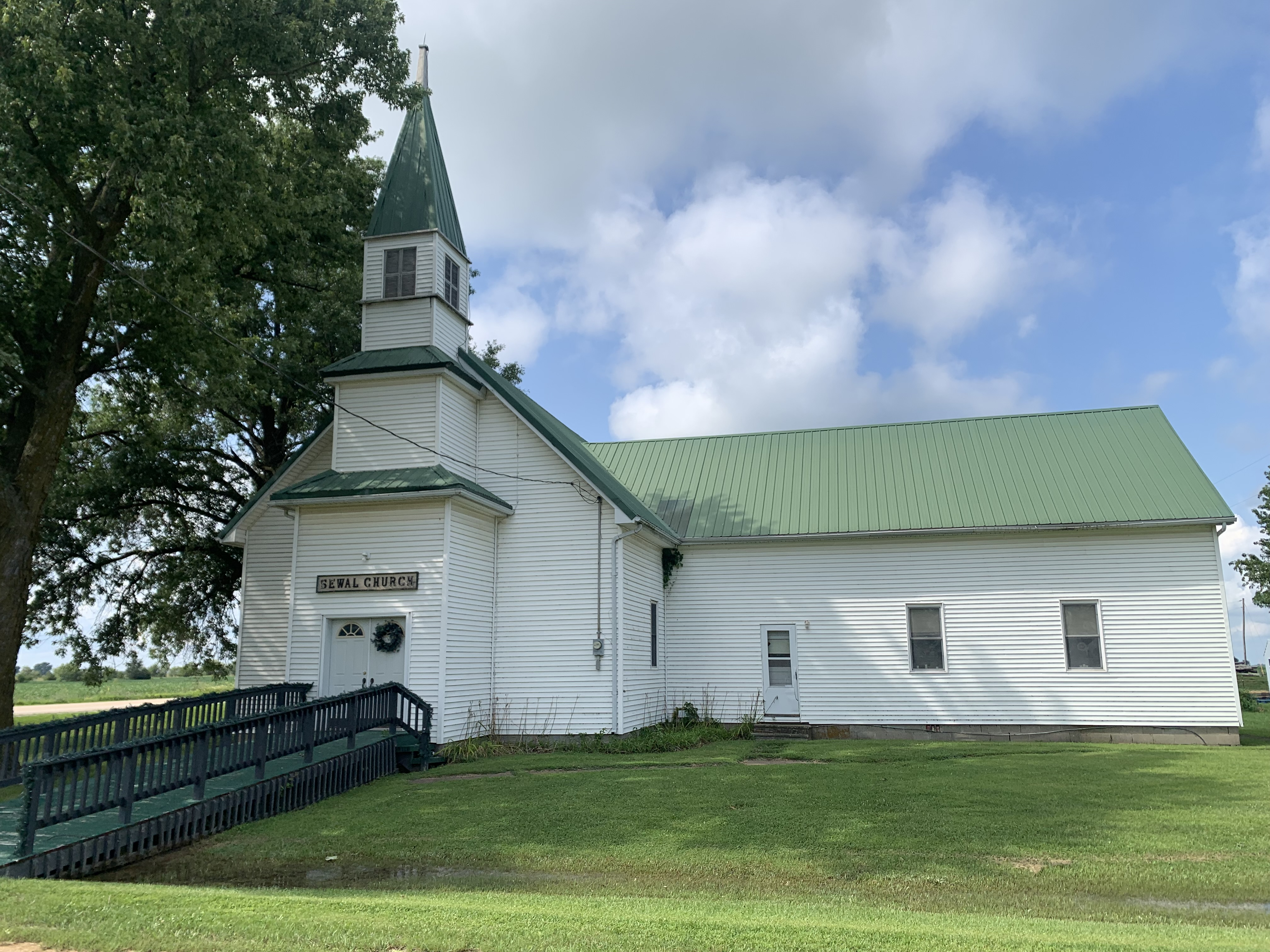
- Sewal Church

- Location within Iowa
- Coordinates: 40°38′39″N 93°15′32″W
- Country: United States
- State: Iowa
- County: Wayne
- Elevation: 1,100 ft (340 m)
- Time zone: UTC-6 (Central (CST))
  - Summer (DST): UTC-5 (CDT)
- ZIP code: 50060
- Area code: 641
- GNIS feature ID: 461513

Sewal is an unincorporated community in Wayne County, Iowa, United States. Located in south central Iowa, the community lies along County Highway S40 in the south-central portion of the county, 5 miles (8.0 km) north of the Iowa–Missouri state border.

The similarly small community of Harvard lies about 4 miles (6.4 km) north of Sewal along County Highway S40. Sewal is located alongside the Dakota, Minnesota, and Eastern Railroad.
