= Spaulding, Iowa =

- Unincorporated community
- Location within Iowa
- Coordinates: 41°08′45″N 94°22′13″W
- Country: United States
- State: Iowa
- County: Union
- Elevation: 1,322 ft (403 m)
- Time zone: UTC-6 (Central (CST))
  - Summer (DST): UTC-5 (CDT)
- Area code: 641
- GNIS feature ID: 464294

Spaulding is an unincorporated community in Spaulding Township, Union County, Iowa, United States. Spaulding is located along county highways H20 and P27, 6 miles (9.7 km) north of Creston.

== History ==
Spaulding's population was 58 in 1902, and 50 in 1925. The population was 50 in 1940.
