= Oralabor, Iowa =

- Unincorporated community
- Location within Iowa
- Coordinates: 41°42′00″N 93°35′17″W
- Country: United States
- State: Iowa
- County: Polk
- Elevation: 965 ft (294 m)
- Time zone: UTC-6 (Central (CST))
  - Summer (DST): UTC-5 (CDT)
- Area code: 515
- GNIS feature ID: 459877

Oralabor is an unincorporated community in Polk County, Iowa, United States.

== History ==
Coal mining was the primary economic activity in Oralabor in the early 1900s. A depot on the Chicago & North Western Railway stood in Oralabor. The etymology of the name Oralabor is likely from the Latin phrase “Ora Et Labora” which means to pray and work.

Oralabor's population was 76 in 1925. The population was estimated at 100 in 1940.
