= Rubens, Iowa =

- former unincorporated community
- Location within Iowa Location within the United States
- Country: United States
- State: Iowa
- County: Pocahontas
- Elevation: 1,197 ft (365 m)
- Time zone: UTC-6 (Central (CST))
  - Summer (DST): UTC-5 (CDT)
- GNIS feature ID: 466288

Rubens is a ghost town in Pocahontas County, in the U.S. state of Iowa.

== History ==
The post office in the community was variously called Powhattan, Powhatan, and Reubens before it closed in 1884. Rubens was named for Peter Paul Rubens, a Flemish painter.
