= Platteville, Iowa =

- Extinct hamlet
- Location within Iowa
- Coordinates: 40°38′24″N 94°33′24″W
- Country: United States
- State: Iowa
- County: Taylor
- Elevation: 1,227 ft (374 m)
- Time zone: UTC-6 (Central (CST))
  - Summer (DST): UTC-5 (CDT)
- Area code: 641
- GNIS feature ID: 464703

Platteville is an extinct hamlet in Gay and Jefferson Townships, Taylor County, Iowa, United States. Platteville is located along 280th Street, 8.9 miles (14.3 km) east-southeast of Bedford.

== History ==
Founded in the 1800s, Platteville's population was 75 in 1902.
