= Grant Township, Page County, Iowa =

Township in Page County, Iowa, U.S.

Coordinates: 40°45′52″N 95°18′32″W

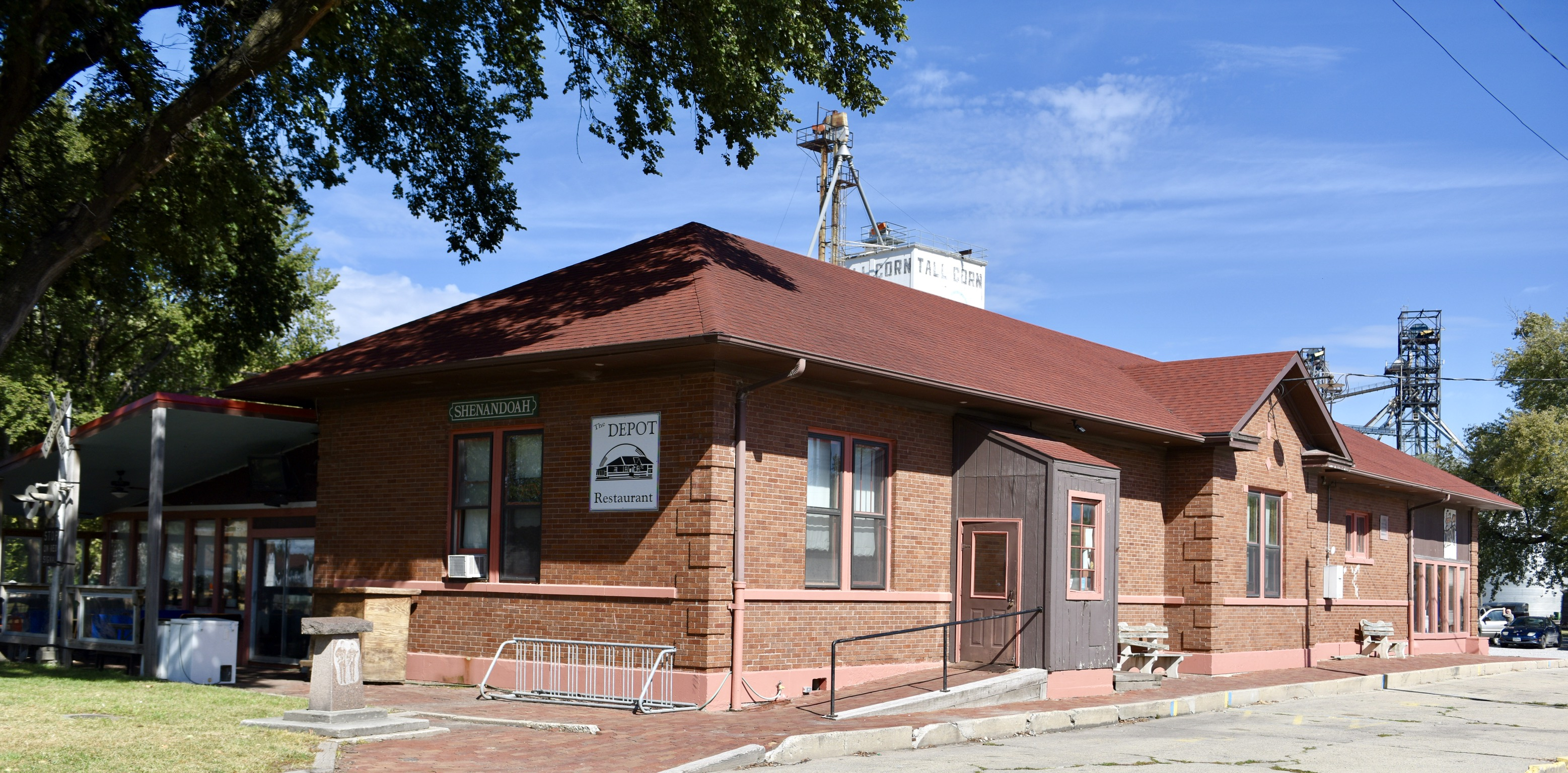
Wabash Combindation Depot in western Shenandoah.

Grant Township is a township in Page County, Iowa, United States.

== History ==
Grant Township (Township 69, Range 39) was surveyed in June 1852 by Thomas D. Evans was established in 1870.
