= Ivester, Iowa =

- unincorporated community
- Location within Iowa Location within the United States
- Country: United States
- State: Iowa
- County: Grundy County
- Elevation: 1,119 ft (341 m)
- Time zone: UTC-6 (Central (CST))
  - Summer (DST): UTC-5 (CDT)
- GNIS feature ID: 464591

Ivester is an unincorporated community in Grundy County, Iowa, United States.

== Geography ==
Ivester is located on County Road T19 9 miles (14 km) west of Grundy Center. It is in Melrose Township.

== History ==
Founded in 1871, Ivester was named after Charles Ivester Keiter, the editor of The Atlas, a Grundy Center newspaper.

Ivester had a post office and a German Baptist Church in the late 1800s. Founded in 1871, the congregation is still active as the Ivester Church of the Bretheren. Circa 1915, Iverster was also the site of a general store, a blacksmith shop, and a creamery.

The post office at Ivester closed in 1904.

In 2019, after ten years of debate, the Grundy County Board of Supervisors approved a 35-mill wind farm in Ivester. The wind farm was controversial, drawing both detractors and supporters.

The Ivester site is sometimes referred to as a ghost town.

== See also ==
- Zaneta, Iowa
