= Guss, Iowa =

- Unincorporated community
- Location within Iowa
- Coordinates: 40°50′31″N 94°51′29″W
- Country: United States
- State: Iowa
- County: Taylor
- Elevation: 1,204 ft (367 m)
- Time zone: UTC-6 (Central (CST))
  - Summer (DST): UTC-5 (CDT)
- Area code: 712
- GNIS feature ID: 464570

Guss is an unincorporated community situated in Nodaway Township, Taylor County, Iowa, United States. Guss is located along County Route N26, approximately 8.2 miles (13.2 km) northwest of the town of Gravity.

== History ==
Founded in the 1800s, Guss had a population of 25 people in 1902.
