= Pleasant Township, Lucas County, Iowa =

Township in Lucas County, Iowa, U.S.

Coordinates: 41.1219°N 93.1419°W

Pleasant Township is a township in Lucas County, Iowa, USA.

== History ==
Pleasant Township was established in 1855.
