= Cloud, Iowa =

- Unincorporated community
- Location within Iowa Location within the United States
- Coordinates: 41°10′30″N 93°14′07″W
- Country: United States
- State: Iowa
- County: Marion
- Elevation: 935 ft (285 m)
- Time zone: UTC-6 (Central (CST))
  - Summer (DST): UTC-5 (CDT)
- Area code: 641
- GNIS feature ID: 464265

Cloud is an unincorporated community in Marion County, Iowa, United States.

== Geography ==
Cloud is located in the southern part of Dallas Township, just 1 mile (1.6 km) from the Lucas County line.

== History ==
Cloud was founded in the 1800s; no town plat ever existed. Cloud was founded near the railroad line of the Chicago, Rock Island & Pacific Railroad that was built in the early 20th century through the southwestern part of Marion County.

Cloud's population was 14 in 1902.

== Notable people ==
Hardin B. Cloud, Iowa state legislator, farmer, and merchant lived in Cloud; he also served as postmaster for Cloud.

== See also ==
- Columbia, Iowa
