= Chequest, Iowa =

- Unincorporated community
- Location within the state of Iowa Chequest (the United States)
- Coordinates: 40°49′42″N 92°14′45″W
- Country: United States
- State: Iowa
- County: Davis
- Elevation: 722 ft (220 m)
- Time zone: UTC-6 (Central (CST))
  - Summer (DST): UTC-5 (CDT)
- GNIS feature ID: 464335

Chequest was an unincorporated community in Davis County, Iowa, United States. Its elevation is 722 feet (287 m). It was on County Road V42 near Chequest Creek.

== History ==
The Chequest post office opened under the name Hall in 1884, was changed to Chequest in 1887, and closed permanently in 1905.

Chequest's population was 15 in 1887, 13 in 1902, 42 in 1917, and 15 in 1925. The population was 11 in 1940.
