= Fredsville, Iowa =

- Unincorporated community
- Location within Iowa
- Country: US
- State: Iowa
- County: Grundy County
- Elevation: 1,014 ft (309 m)
- Time zone: UTC-6 (Central (CST))
  - Summer (DST): UTC-5 (CDT)
- GNIS feature ID: 456755

Fredsville is an unincorporated community in Grundy County, Iowa.

== History ==
The town of Fredsville began when Danish settlers came to the highest area in Grundy County in the mid-1800s. Although small, the town had a creamery.

In 1871, the Fredsville settlers organized a Lutheran church congregation. At the time, they called it Fairfield Scandinavian Lutheran Congregation. The name befit the town's location in Fairfield Township of Grundy County. However, it has been renamed to Fredsville Evangelical Lutheran Church, which continues to be an active congregation of the Evangelical Lutheran Church in America.

Fredsville's population was 52 in 1902.

Although the town of Fredsville still appears when searched on Google Maps, it is no longer an incorporated location.
