= Maple River, Iowa =

- Unincorporated community
- Location within Iowa
- Coordinates: 42°05′53″N 94°56′07″W
- Country: United States
- State: Iowa
- County: Carroll
- Elevation: 1,276 ft (389 m)
- Time zone: UTC-6 (Central (CST))
  - Summer (DST): UTC-5 (CDT)
- Area code: 712
- GNIS feature ID: 458786

Maple River is an unincorporated community in Carroll County, in the U.S. state of Iowa.

== History ==
A post office was established as Maple River Junction in 1877, and renamed Maple River in 1883; the post office remained in operation until it was discontinued in 1968. The community took its name from a nearby stream lined with soft maple trees.

Maple River's population was 76 in 1902, and 108 in 1925. The population was estimated at 100 in 1940.
