= Canoe, Iowa =

- Unincorporated community
- Location within the state of Iowa Canoe, Iowa (the United States)
- Coordinates: 43°21′03″N 91°39′15″W
- Country: United States
- State: Iowa
- County: Winneshiek
- Elevation: 958 ft (292 m)
- Time zone: UTC-6 (Central (CST))
  - Summer (DST): UTC-5 (CDT)
- GNIS feature ID: 465557

Canoe is an unincorporated community in northeastern Winneshiek County, Iowa, United States.

== History ==
A post office was established in August 1857, and remained in operation off and on until being discontinued in December 1905. Canoe's population was 15 in 1925. The population was also 15 in 1940.
