= Liberty Township, Lucas County, Iowa =

Township in Lucas County, Iowa, U.S.

Coordinates: 41.1236°N 93.3825°W

Liberty Township is a township in Lucas County, Iowa, United States.

== History ==
Liberty Township was established in 1852.
