= Žaneta Đukić Perišić =

Žaneta Đukić-Perišić (Serbian Cyrillic: Жанета Ђукић-Перишић; born 1956 in Belgrade, Yugoslavia) is a Serbian literary scholar and literary historian.

== Biography ==
Žaneta Đukić-Perišić was raised in Belgrade and graduated in literature and theory of literature at the Faculty of Philology of the University of Belgrade. She continued her postgraduate studies in Leningrad and Belgrade again, obtaining her magister degree with a thesis on Alexander Veselovsky and the second thesis on the protagonist of the narrative Zanos i stradanje Tome Galusa (Fervor and Suffering of Toma Galus) by Ivo Andrić. Đukić-Perišić obtained her doctorate as PhD at the Faculty of Philosophy of the University of Novi Sad in 2011.

She received the Isidora Sekulić Award 2012 for one of her numerous studies on life and work of Ivo Andrić, which is the main topic in almost all of her academic writing. She has been a member of the Ivo Andrić Foundation since 1983 and was appointed as its managing director in 2016. She was married to Miodrag Perišić.

Žaneta Đukić-Perišić can be seen in the TV documentary series Biti čovek: Ivo Andrić (Being Human: Ivo Andrić; 2015).

== Awards ==
Her awards include:

- Isidora Sekulić Award, 2012
- Vuk Award (Vukova nagrada), 2023

== Bibliography (selection) ==
- Kavaljer svetog duha: o jednom nedovršenom romanu Ive Andrića (Kavaljer svetog duha: about an unfinished novel by Ivo Andrić), Ivo Andrić Foundation, Belgrade 1992, ISBN 86-81131-04-4.
- Jewish Portraits in the Works of Ivo Andrić (edited by Sofija Škorić), Serbian Literary Company, Toronto 2005, ISBN 0-9730264-6-4.
- Pisac i priča : stvaralačka biografija Ive Andrića (Writer and story: creative biography of Ivo Andrić), Akademska knjiga, Novi Sad 2012, ISBN 978-86-6263-016-2.
- Na početku svih staza : Andrić i Višegrad (At the beginning of all the trails: Andrić and Višegrad, Vukotić media, Belgrade 2015, ISBN 978-86-89613-31-5.
