= Oakfield, Iowa =

- Unincorporated community
- Location within Iowa
- Coordinates: 41°32′00″N 94°54′28″W
- Country: United States
- State: Iowa
- County: Audubon
- Elevation: 1,280 ft (390 m)
- Time zone: UTC-6 (Central (CST))
  - Summer (DST): UTC-5 (CDT)
- Area code: 712
- GNIS feature ID: 464205

Oakfield is a former unincorporated community in Audubon County, Iowa, United States, located half a mile east of Brayton.

== History ==
The first store was built in Oakfield in 1855, and the town's name was suggested by a resident who originally came from Oakfield, New York. The first school was built in 1858. When the railroad passed through Brayton, however, it began to decline. By 1929, it had been reduced to only a general store and a few houses. The Oakfield Academy school operated for many years and has been preserved.

A post office was established in Oakfield in 1859 and remained in operation until it was discontinued in 1875.
