= Norwich, Iowa =

- Extinct hamlet
- Location within Iowa
- Coordinates: 40°44′33″N 95°15′24″W
- Country: United States
- State: Iowa
- County: Page
- Elevation: 1,168 ft (356 m)
- Time zone: UTC-6 (Central (CST))
  - Summer (DST): UTC-5 (CDT)
- Area code: 712
- GNIS feature ID: 464674

Norwich is an extinct hamlet in Tarkio Township, Page County, Iowa, United States. Norwich is located along Iowa Highway 2, 6.5 miles (10.5 km) east-southeast of Shenandoah.

== History ==
Founded in the 1800s, Norwich's population was 88 in 1902, and 70 in 1925. The population was 60 in 1940. Nothing remains of the village today.
