= Harvard, Iowa =

- Unincorporated community
- Location within Iowa
- Coordinates: 40°41′24″N 93°16′10″W
- Country: United States
- State: Iowa
- County: Wayne
- Elevation: 1,090 ft (330 m)
- Time zone: UTC-6 (Central (CST))
  - Summer (DST): UTC-5 (CDT)
- ZIP code: 50060
- Area code: 641
- GNIS feature ID: 457306

Harvard is an unincorporated community in Wayne County, Iowa, United States. Located in south central Iowa, the community lies along County Highway S40 in the south-central portion of the county, 9 miles (14 km) north of the Iowa–Missouri state border.

The similarly small community of Sewal lies about 4 miles (6.4 km) south of Harvard along County Highway S40. Harvard is located alongside the historic Mormon Trail.
