= Washington Prairie, Iowa =

- unincorporated community
- Location in Iowa
- Country: United States
- State: Iowa
- County: Winneshiek County
- Elevation: 1,217 ft (371 m)
- Time zone: UTC-6 (CST)
  - Summer (DST): UTC-5 (CDT)
- GNIS feature ID: 464056

Washington Prairie is an unincorporated community in Winneshiek County, Iowa, in the United States.

== History ==
Washington Prairie's population was 14 in 1902, and was 20 in 1925. The population was 20 in 1940.
