= Wayne Township, Mitchell County, Iowa =

Township in Mitchell County, Iowa, U.S.

Coordinates: 43.4644°N 92.6131°W

Wayne Township is a township in Mitchell County, Iowa, United States.

== History ==
Wayne Township was first settled in 1853.
