= Bliedorn, Iowa =

Historical community

Coordinates: 41°54′09″N 90°40′42″W

- Unincorporated community
- Location within Iowa
- Country: United States
- State: Iowa
- County: Clinton
- Time zone: UTC-6 (Central (CST))
  - Summer (DST): UTC-5 (CDT)

Bliedorn was a hamlet in Clinton County, Iowa, on the Bliedorn Road at Latitude: 41° 54' 9 N, Longitude: 90° 40' 42 W.

== History ==
The Bliedorn post office was open 1900–1903, and its population was 12 in 1902.
