= Fairville, Iowa =

- Unincorporated community
- Location within Iowa
- Coordinates: 43°09′22″N 94°27′48″W
- Country: United States
- State: Iowa
- County: Palo Alto
- Elevation: 1,299 ft (396 m)
- Time zone: UTC-6 (Central (CST))
  - Summer (DST): UTC-5 (CDT)
- Area code: 712
- GNIS feature ID: 456526

Fairville is an unincorporated community in Fairfield Township, Palo Alto County, Iowa, United States. Fairville is located along county highway B20, 11.5 miles (18.5 km) east-northeast of Emmetsburg.

== History ==
Fairville's population was 54 in 1925. The population was 17 in 1940.
