= Zero, Iowa =

- former unincorporated community
- Location within Iowa Location within the United States
- Coordinates: 40°59′00″N 93°07′38″W
- Country: United States
- State: Iowa
- County: Lucas
- Elevation: 942 ft (287 m)

Population (2000)
  - Total: 0
- Time zone: UTC-6 (Central (CST))
  - Summer (DST): UTC-5 (CDT)
- GNIS feature ID: 464296

Zero is a ghost town and former unincorporated community in Lucas County, in the U.S. state of Iowa. between Russell and Melrose.

== History ==
Zero was platted in 1883 as a mining community, with the townsite being divided into five streets and 61 lots. There was a post office and the general store was operated by Henry Gettinger. The Zero Mine closed in 1886 due to flooding in the mine. Zero's population was estimated at 200 in 1887, and was 35 in 1902.

Zero's population continued to decline throughout the twentieth century. In 1978, the Lucas County Genealogical Society wrote, "Only a couple of old wooden buildings and a few foundations remain of the old town [...] Today Zero, Iowa, is losing its contest with time. Fred Schreck is the last person living there in 1978 and he is 78 years old. The few buildings that remain have deteriorated past the point of ugliness and have achieved a weathered beauty of their own. The lovely countryside is closing in on the once proud house and sagging barn, and the shingle roofs no longer hold back the rain."

Little remains of the original townsite.
