= Vilmar, Iowa =

- Unincorporated community
- Location within the state of Iowa Vilmar, Iowa (the United States)
- Coordinates: 42°49′05″N 92°49′46″W
- Country: United States
- State: Iowa
- County: Butler
- Elevation: 1,053 ft (321 m)
- Time zone: UTC-6 (Central (CST))
  - Summer (DST): UTC-5 (CDT)

Vilmar, also known as Wilmar, is an unincorporated community in Butler County, Iowa, United States. It lies west of Iowa Highway 14 5.5 miles southwest of the community of Greene.

== History ==
Vilmar was founded by German families. The German Evangelical Lutheran St. Johannes Church was built in 1883, the grounds included a parsonage and confirmation school. St. John's Lutheran Church - Vilmar still operates in the community.

Vilmar's population was 21 in 1915, and 15 in 1925. The population was 25 in 1940.
