= Larland, Iowa =

- Unincorporated community
- Location within Iowa
- Coordinates: 41°43′54″N 94°45′47″W
- Country: United States
- State: Iowa
- County: Audubon
- Elevation: 1,371 ft (418 m)
- Time zone: UTC-6 (Central (CST))
  - Summer (DST): UTC-5 (CDT)
- Area code: 712
- GNIS feature ID: 458233

Larland was a rural unincorporated community in Audubon County, Iowa, in the United States. It was located about 9 miles east of Aududon, the county seat, in Melville Township.

== History ==
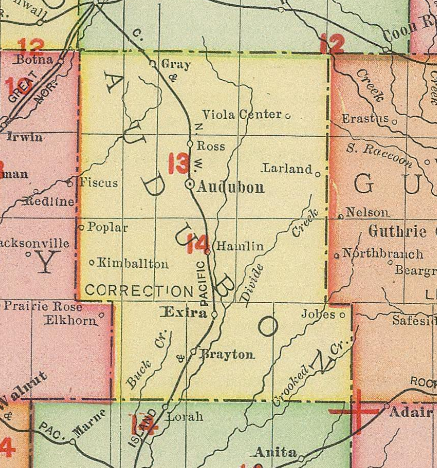
Larland appeared on the 1903 Rand McNally State of Iowa map.

A rural farming community, a post office was established in Larland on April 30, 1890, and remained in operation until it was discontinued on May 15, 1902. Larland was located in the eastern part of Melville Township, near the county line.

The community once had a general store, and more than one rural school was located in Larland, including the Union Schools and the Melville Schools.

Larland's population was 28 in 1902, and 30 in 1924. Years of rural migration emptied the area, and by 1932, Larland was considered abandoned. The population was 10 in 1940.

The Des Moines Register noted in 1989 the community no longer existed.
