= Columbia, Iowa =

- Unincorporated community
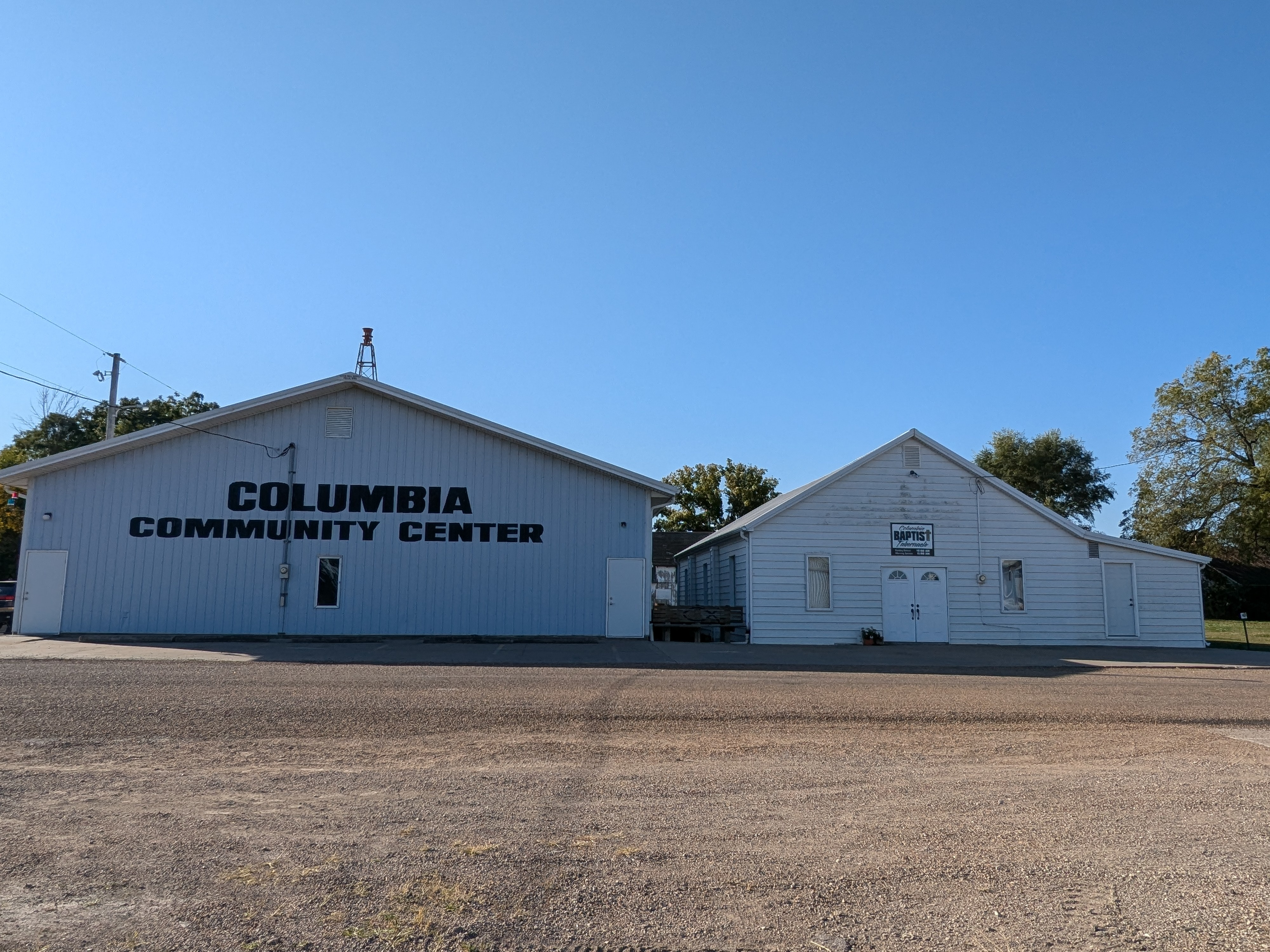
- Columbia Community Center and Baptist Tabernacle

- Location within Iowa Location within the United States
- Coordinates: 41°10′31″N 93°09′00″W
- Country: United States
- State: Iowa
- County: Marion
- Time zone: UTC-6 (Central (CST))
  - Summer (DST): UTC-5 (CDT)

Columbia is an unincorporated community in Marion County, Iowa, United States.

== History ==
The population of Columbia was 160 in 1940.
