= Forbush, Iowa =

- Unincorporated community
- Location within Iowa
- Coordinates: 40°46′08″N 92°52′38″W
- Country: United States
- State: Iowa
- County: Appanoose
- Elevation: 984 ft (300 m)
- Time zone: UTC-6 (Central (CST))
  - Summer (DST): UTC-5 (CDT)
- Area code: 641
- GNIS feature ID: 464548

Forbush is an unincorporated community in Appanoose County, Iowa, United States.

== History ==
A post office was established in Forbush in 1894, and remained in operation until being discontinued in 1903.
