= Page Center, Iowa =

- Extinct hamlet
- Location within Iowa
- Coordinates: 40°42′44″N 95°07′47″W
- Country: United States
- State: Iowa
- County: Page
- Elevation: 1,201 ft (366 m)
- Time zone: UTC-6 (Central (CST))
  - Summer (DST): UTC-5 (CDT)
- Area code: 712
- GNIS feature ID: 464693

Page Center, also known as Page City, is an extinct hamlet in Harlan Township, Page County, Iowa, United States. Page Center is located along County Highway M60, 5.2 miles (8.4 km) west-southwest of Clarinda.

== History ==
Page's population was estimated at 25 in 1887, was 53 in 1902, and was 32 in 1925. The population was 25 in 1940.
