= Depew, Iowa =

- Unincorporated community
- Location within Iowa
- Coordinates: 43°11′03″N 94°32′33″W
- Country: United States
- State: Iowa
- County: Palo Alto
- Elevation: 1,289 ft (393 m)
- Time zone: UTC-6 (Central (CST))
  - Summer (DST): UTC-5 (CDT)
- Area code: 712
- GNIS feature ID: 455886

Depew is an unincorporated community in Independence Township, Palo Alto County, Iowa, United States. Depew is located along county highways B20 and N60, 8.7 miles (14.0 km) northeast of Emmetsburg.

== History ==
Depew's population was 25 in 1902, and just 10 in 1925. The population was 20 in 1940.
