= Prole, Iowa =

- Unincorporated community
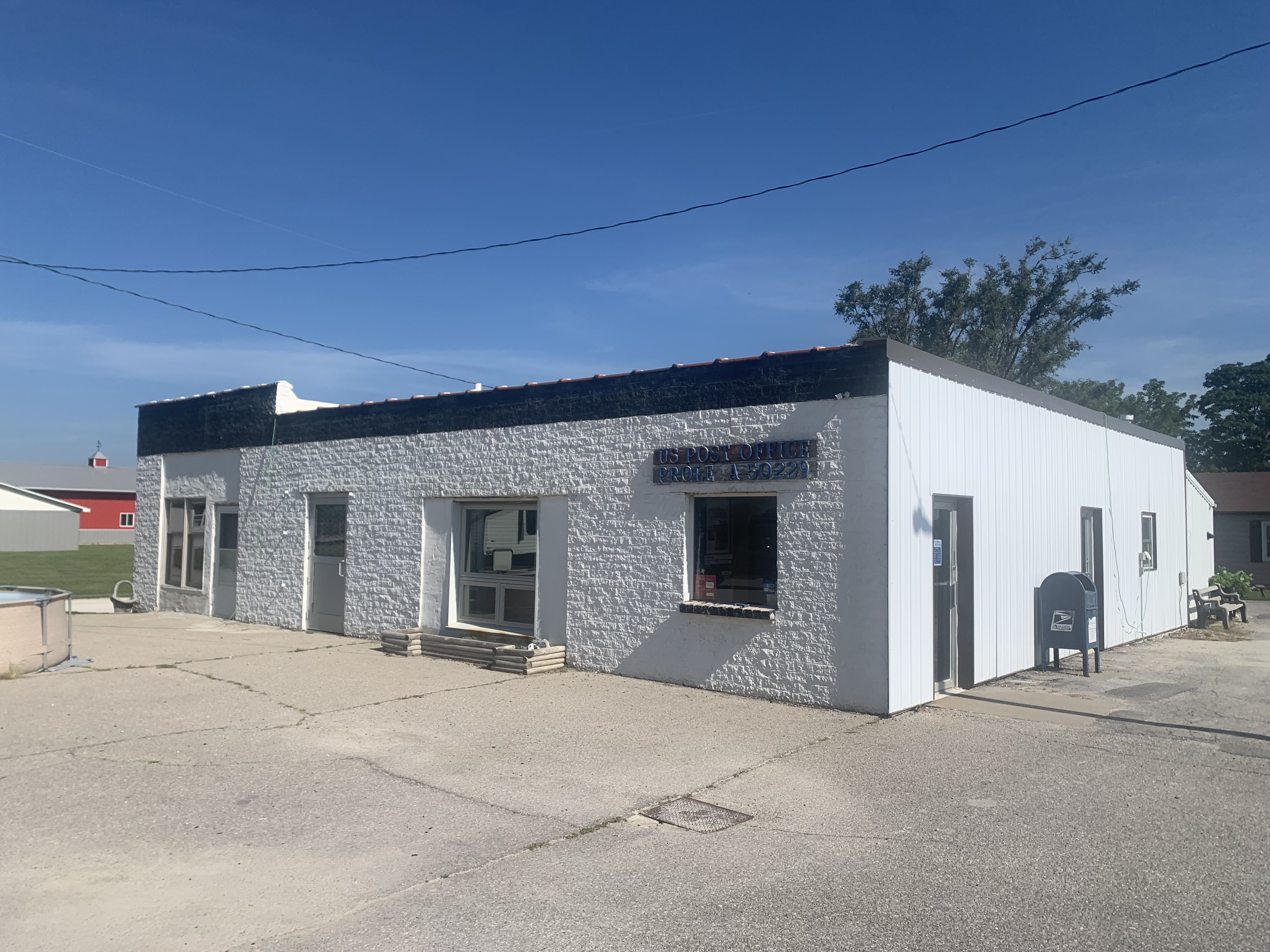
- Prole post office

- Location within the state of Iowa Prole, Iowa (the United States)
- Coordinates: 41°24′33″N 93°43′38″W
- Country: United States
- State: Iowa
- County: Warren
- Elevation: 978 ft (298 m)
- Time zone: UTC-6 (Central (CST))
  - Summer (DST): UTC-5 (CDT)
- ZIP codes: 50229
- Area code: 515
- GNIS feature ID: 460458

Prole (/prɔɪ/ PROY) is an unincorporated community in northwestern Warren County, Iowa, United States. It lies along Iowa Highway 28 northwest of the city of Indianola, the county seat of Warren County. Its elevation is 978 feet (298 m). Prole has a post office, with the ZIP code of 50229,

== History ==
Prole was laid out in 1884. The post office has been in operation in Prole since 25 September 1884.

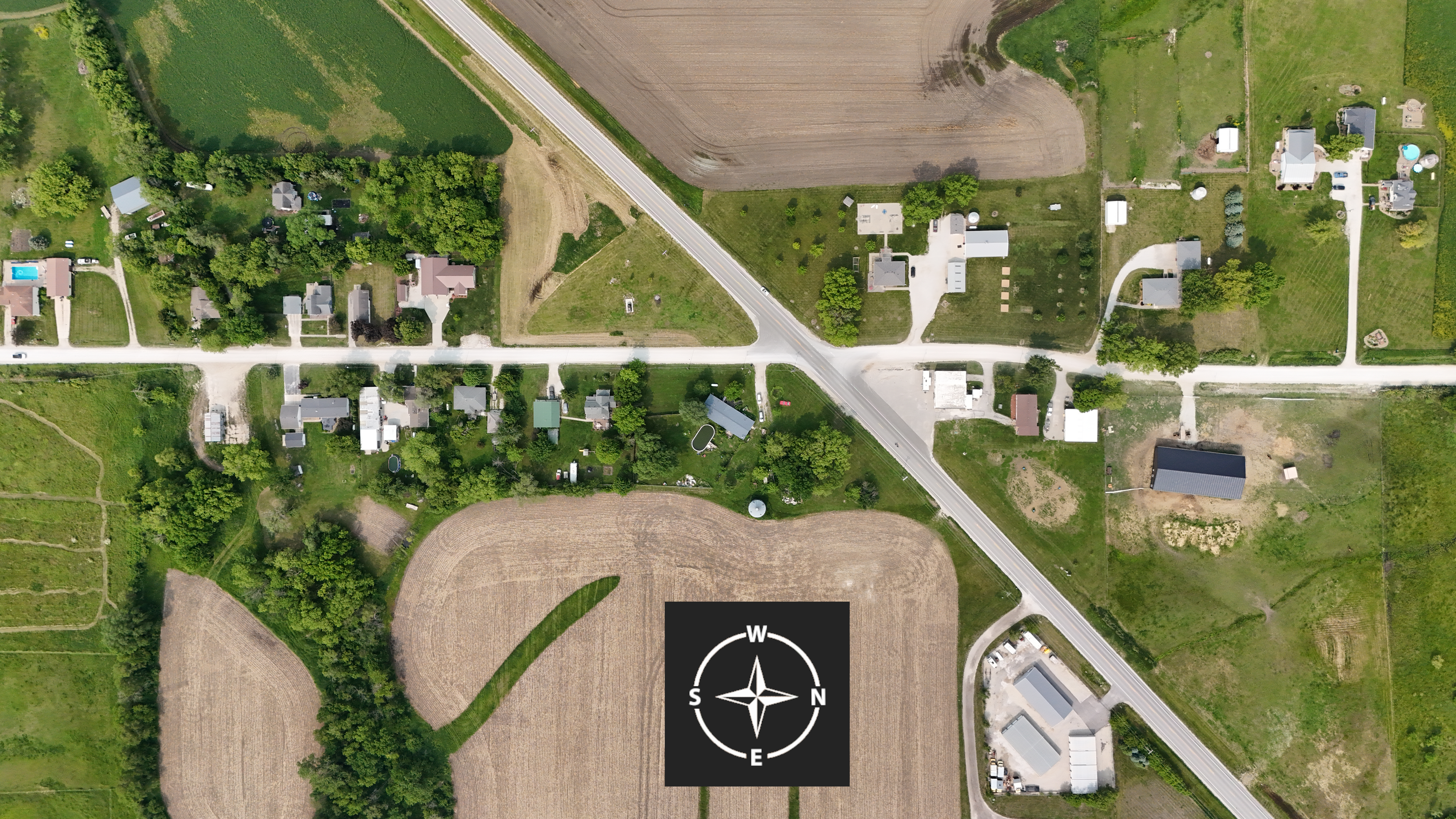
An aerial view of Prole, taken on May 31, 2025

Prole's population was 21 in 1902, and 55 in 1925. The population was 37 in 1940.
