= Ross, Iowa =

- Unincorporated community
- Location within Iowa
- Coordinates: 41°46′27″N 94°55′08″W
- Country: United States
- State: Iowa
- Counties: Audubon
- Elevation: 1,394 ft (425 m)
- Time zone: UTC-6 (Central (CST))
  - Summer (DST): UTC-5 (CDT)
- ZIP code: 50025
- Area code: 712
- FIPS code: 19-68835
- GNIS feature ID: 0460813

Ross is an unincorporated community in Audubon County, Iowa, in the United States.

== History ==
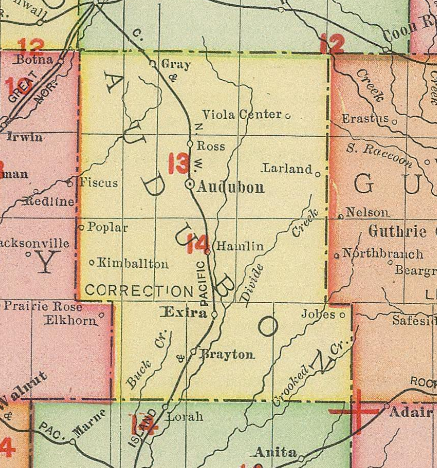
Ross appears on the 1903 Rand McNally State of Iowa map.

Ross was platted in July 1882, in Leroy Township's Section 4. It was named in honor of a local farmer.

Among the establishments in the community of Ross were the post office (established in 1883), a blacksmith shop, a lumber yard, a general store, a hardware store, and Ross Grain Elevator, now listed on the National Register of Historic Places. A railroad depot was completed in 1885.

Ross' population was 55 in 1902. By 1915, both Methodist and Lutheran churches operated in Ross. The population was 70 in 1940.
