= Zaneta, Iowa =

- unincorporated community
- Location within Iowa Location within the United States
- Country: USA
- State: Iowa
- County: Grundy County
- Elevation: 909 ft (277 m)
- Time zone: UTC-6 (Central (CST))
  - Summer (DST): UTC-5 (CDT)
- GNIS feature ID: 464812

Zaneta is an unincorporated community in Grundy County, Iowa, United States.

== Geography ==
It is located on County Road D35 west of Hudson.

== History ==
Zaneta was founded in the 1800s. It was named after Zanesville, Ohio; the "Zane" portion was retained while "ta" was added "for euphony". A Methodist church was built at Zaneta in 1902, moved from North Fork.

Zaneta's population was 16 in 1915, and just 12 in 1925.

In 1940, Zaneta's population was 18 residents.
