= Waterloo–Cedar Falls metropolitan area =

Coordinates: 42.49°N 92.34°W

Waterloo–Cedar Falls, IA Waterloo–Cedar Falls, IA Metropolitan Statistical Area, Cedarloo Area
- Metropolitan Statistical Area
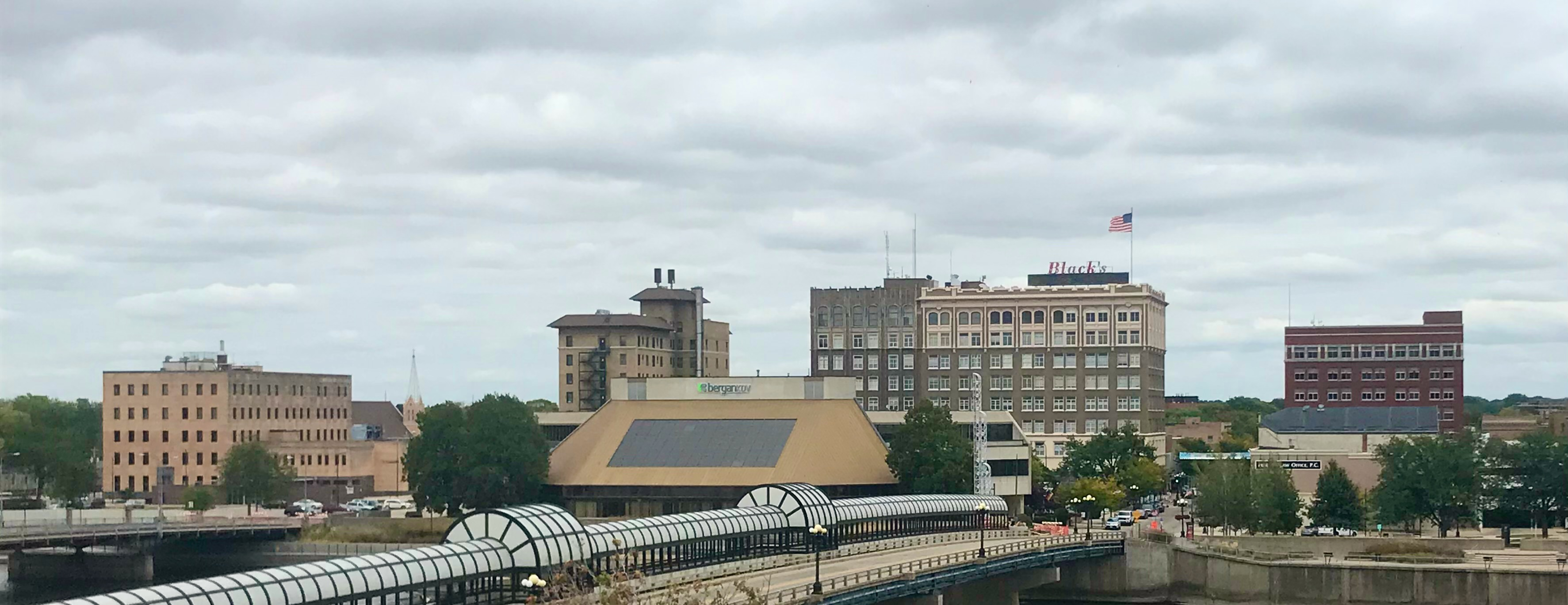
- Waterloo Skyline 2022
Interactive Map of Waterloo–Cedar Falls, IA MSA
City of Waterloo
City of Cedar Falls
Waterloo–Cedar Falls, IA MSA
- Country: United States
- State: Iowa
- Principal cities: Waterloo; Cedar Falls
- Time zone: UTC−6 (CST)
  - Summer (DST): UTC−5 (CDT)

The Waterloo–Cedar Falls Metropolitan Statistical Area, as defined by the United States Census Bureau, is an area consisting of three counties in Iowa, anchored by the cities of Waterloo and Cedar Falls. As of the 2000 census, the MSA had a population of 163,706 (though a July 1, 2009 estimate placed the population at 164,913). As of the 2010 Census, the MSA had a population of 169,484.

== Counties ==
- Black Hawk
- Bremer
- Grundy

== Communities ==
=== Places with more than 50,000 inhabitants ===
- Waterloo (Principal city)

=== Places with 25,000 to 50,000 inhabitants ===
- Cedar Falls (Principal city)

=== Places with 10,000 to 25,000 inhabitants ===
- Waverly

=== Places with 1,000 to 10,000 inhabitants ===
- Conrad
- Denver
- Dike
- Elk Run Heights
- Evansdale
- Grundy Center
- Hudson
- Janesville
- Jesup (partial)
- La Porte City
- Reinbeck
- Sumner (partial)
- Tripoli

=== Places with 500 to 1,000 inhabitants ===
- Dunkerton
- Gilbertville
- Raymond
- Readlyn
- Wellsburg

=== Places with fewer than 500 inhabitants ===
- Beaman
- Frederika
- Holland
- Morrison
- Plainfield
- Stout

=== Unincorporated places ===
- Bremer
- Deanville
- Dewar
- Eagle Center
- Finchford
- Glasgow
- Siegel
- Spring Lake
- Voorhies
- Washburn

== Townships ==
- Barclay (Black Hawk County)
- Beaver (Grundy County)
- Bennington (Black Hawk County)
- Big Creek (Black Hawk County)
- Black Hawk (Black Hawk County)
- Black Hawk (Grundy County)
- Cedar Falls (Black Hawk County)
- Cedar (Black Hawk County)
- City of Sumner (Bremer County)
- City of Waterloo (Black Hawk County)
- City of Waverly (Bremer County)
- Clay (Grundy County)
- Colfax (Grundy County)
- Dayton (Bremer County)
- Douglas (Bremer County)
- Eagle (Black Hawk County)
- East Waterloo (Black Hawk County)
- Fairfield (Grundy County)
- Felix (Grundy County)
- Fox (Black Hawk County)
- Franklin (Bremer County)
- Frederika (Bremer County)
- Fremont (Bremer County)
- German (Grundy County)

- Grant (Grundy County)
- Jackson (Bremer County)
- Jefferson (Bremer County)
- Lafayette (Bremer County)
- Le Roy (Bremer County)
- Lester (Black Hawk County)
- Lincoln (Black Hawk County)
- Lincoln (Grundy County)
- Maxfield (Bremer County)
- Melrose (Grundy County)
- Mount Vernon (Black Hawk County)
- Orange (Black Hawk County)
- Palermo (Grundy County)
- Pleasant Valley (Grundy County)
- Polk (Bremer County)
- Poyner (Black Hawk County)
- Shiloh (Grundy County)
- Spring Creek (Black Hawk County)
- Sumner No. 2 (Bremer County)
- Union (Black Hawk County)
- Warren (Bremer County)
- Washington (Black Hawk County)
- Washington (Bremer County)
- Washington (Grundy County)

== Demographics ==
As of the census of 2000, there were 163,706 people, 63,527 households, and 41,855 families residing within the MSA. The racial makeup of the MSA was 90.62% White, 6.29% African American, 0.15% Native American, 0.86% Asian, 0.04% Pacific Islander, 0.75% from other races, and 1.29% from two or more races. Hispanic or Latino of any race were 1.56% of the population.

The median income for a household in the MSA was $39,163, and the median income for a family was $48,108. Males had a median income of $33,119 versus $22,549 for females. The per capita income for the MSA was $19,075.

== See also ==
- Iowa census statistical areas
