= Iowa's 11th Senate district =

American legislative district

Iowa's 11th State Senate district
Senator
Julian Garrett; R

The 11th District of the Iowa Senate is located in central Iowa, and is currently composed of Warren County and parts of Marion County.

== Current elected officials ==
Julian Garrett is the senator currently representing the 11th District.

The area of the 11th District contains two Iowa House of Representatives districts:

- The 21st District (represented by Brooke Boden)
- The 22nd District (represented by Stanley Gustafson)

The district is also located in Iowa's 1st congressional district, which is represented by U.S. Representative Mariannette Miller-Meeks.

== List of Representatives ==
Representative	Party	Dates	Residence	Notes
Thomas Hughes	Democrat	1846-1847	Johnson County	
Freeman Alger	Democrat	1848-1851	Muscatine County	
George W. Lucas	Democrat	1852-1855	Fremont County	
Samuel Dale	Democrat	1856-1859	Taylor County	
John Johnson	Democrat	1860-1861	Ottumwa, Iowa	
Jacob Dixon	Republican	1862-1863	Ottumwa, Iowa	
Daniel P. Stubbs	Republican	1864-1867	Fairfield, Iowa	
Theron Woolson	Republican	1868-1869	Henry County	
John P. West	Republican	1870-1875	Henry County	
John Woolson	Republican	1876-1877	Mount Pleasant, Iowa	
Moses McCoid	Republican	1878	Fairfield, Iowa	McCoid was elected to the US House of Representatives for Iowa's 1st congressional district in 1878.
Sanford Boling	Republican	1880-1883	Fairfield, Iowa	
Francis Duncan	Republican	1844-1887	Columbus Junction, Iowa	
James Barnett	Independent	1888-1891	Indianola, Iowa	
James Jamison	Republican	1892-1895	Osceola, Iowa	
William Berry	Democrat	1896-1899	Warren County	
William Tallman	Republican	1900-1903	Osceola, Iowa	
James Jamison	Republican	1904-1908	Osceola, Iowa	
Aaron Proudfoot	Republican	1909-1912	Warren County	
LeMerton Crist	Republican	1913-1916	Osceola, Iowa	
Aaron Proudfoot	Republican	1917-1920	Warren County	
Lloyd Thurston	Republican	1921-1924	Osceola, Iowa	Thurston was elected to the US House of Representatives for Iowa's 5th congressional district in 1924.
Charles Kern	Republican	1925-1928	Warren County	
Wesley Lowe	Republican	1929-1932	Clarke County	
William S. Beardsley	Republican	1933-1940	Warren County	
Floyd Jones	Republican	1941-1948	Osceola, Iowa	
Loyd Van Patten	Republican	1949-1952	Warren County	
George Bellman	Republican	1953-1956	Warren County	
J. Louis Fisher	Republican	1957-1964	Osceola, Iowa	
Bass Van Gilst	Democrat	1965-1966	Mahaska County	
Stanley Heaberlin	Democrat	1967-1968	Pleasantville, Iowa	
Charles Laverty	Republican	1969-1970	Indianola, Iowa	
Charles Sullivan	Republican	1971	Woodbury County	Senator Sullivan died in office in 1971.
George Gross	Democrat	1971-1972	Sioux City, Iowa	
Gene Kennedy	Democrat	1973-1974	Dubuque County	
Richard Norpel	Democrat	1975-1976	Jackson County	
Stephen Bisenius	Republican	1977-1982	Dubuque County	
John Jensen	Republican	1983-2002	Bremer County	
William Dotzler	Democrat	2003-2012	Waterloo, Iowa	
Hubert Houser	Republican	2013-2014	Pottawattamie County	
Tom Shipley	Republican	2015-2022	Nodaway, Iowa	
Julian Garrett	Republican	2023-present	Warren County	

== Historical district boundaries ==
Map	Description	Years effective	Notes
	Benton County Cedar County; Linn County	1846-1849	From 1846 to 1857, district numbering was not utilized by the Iowa State Legislature. This convention was added with the passing of the 1857 Iowa Constitution. Numbering of districts pre-1857 is done as a matter of historic convenience.
	Benton County Cedar County; Linn County; Tama County	1850-1851	
	Adams County Fremont County; Mills County; Montgomery County; Page County; Ringgold County; Taylor County; Union County	1852-1859	
	Wapello County	1860-1863	
	Jefferson County	1864-1867	
	Henry County	1868-1877	
	Jefferson County	1878-1883	
	Louisa County Washington County	1884-1887	
	Clarke County Warren County	1888-1962	
	Keokuk County Mahaska County	1963-1966	
	Marion County Warren County	1967-1970	
	Woodbury County (partial): Sioux City	1971-1972	In 1970, the Iowa Legislature passed an amendment to the Iowa Constitution setting forth the rules for legislative redistricting in order to abide by the rules established by the Reynolds v. Sims Supreme Court case. The first reapportionment map created by the Republican controlled legislature was deemed unconstitutional, but was still used for the 1970 election.
	Delaware County (partial) Dubuque County (partial); Jackson County (partial); Jones County (partial)	1973-1982	
	Black Hawk County (partial) Bremer County; Butler County; Grundy County	1983-1992	
	Black Hawk County (partial) Bremer County; Butler County; Grundy County	1993-2002	
	Black Hawk County (partial): Eagle Township; East Waterloo Township; Poyner Township; Orange Township; Elk Run Heights; Evansdale; Raymond; Eastern half of Waterloo	2003-2012	
	Adams County Cass County (partial): Excluding; Benton Township; Franklin Township; Grant Township; Lincoln Township; Anita; Wiota; Pottawattamie County (partial): Excluding; Carter Lake; Council Bluffs; Union County	2013-2022	
	Marion County (partial): Franklin Township; Knoxville Township; Union Township; Knoxville; Warren County	2023-present	

== See also ==
- Iowa General Assembly
- Iowa Senate
