= Interstate 380 (Iowa) =

Auxiliary Interstate Highway in Iowa, United States

Interstate 380
- I-380 highlighted in red

Route information
- Auxiliary route of I-80
- Maintained by Iowa DOT
- Length: 72.969 mi (117.432 km)
- Existed: c. September 19, 1973–present
- History: Under construction 1973–1985
- NHS: Entire route

Major junctions
- South end: I-80 / US 218 / Iowa 27 at Coralville
- US 30 / US 151 in Cedar Rapids; US 151 Bus. in Cedar Rapids; US 20 / Iowa 27 in Black Hawk County
- North end: US 218 in Waterloo

Location
- Country: United States
- State: Iowa
- Counties: Johnson; Linn; Benton; Buchanan; Black Hawk

Highway system
- Interstate Highway System; Main; Auxiliary; Suffixed; Business; Future; Iowa Primary Highway System; Interstate; US; State; Secondary; Scenic
← Iowa 376	→ Iowa 404

Interstate 380 (I-380) is a 73-mile (117 km) auxiliary Interstate Highway in eastern Iowa. The route extends from I-80 near Coralville to Waterloo. I-380 connects the cities of Cedar Rapids and Waterloo, the state's second- and sixth-largest cities, respectively, to the Interstate Highway System. Except for its last 1.5 miles (2.4 km) north of U.S. Highway 20 (US 20), I-380 runs concurrently with Iowa Highway 27 (Iowa 27), which represents Iowa's portion of the 560-mile (900 km) Avenue of the Saints highway connecting Saint Louis, Missouri, with Saint Paul, Minnesota.

Construction of I-380 took 12 years to complete, ending in 1985. After the Interstate opened, US 218 was moved onto the new freeway south of Cedar Rapids. In the 1990s, the I-380 corridor was selected as part of the Avenue of the Saints corridor, which Iowa designated as Iowa 27 in 2001. I-380 has been affected by two major floods, the Great Flood of 1993 and the Iowa flood of 2008, both of which closed the road at the Iowa River for two weeks.

== Route description ==
I-380 begins where US 218 and Iowa 27 cross I-80 in Coralville in Johnson County. From the interchange, I-380, US 218, and Iowa 27, the route assigned to the Avenue of the Saints highway in Iowa run concurrently toward Cedar Rapids. The Interstate heads north and serves North Liberty. North of North Liberty, the freeway runs parallel to the former routing of US 218 and Iowa 965; here, the two highways cross the Iowa River. After crossing into Linn County, the three routes enter the Cedar Rapids city limits near Eastern Iowa Airport. Three miles (4.8 km) north of the airport, I-380 intersects US 30 and US 151 at a combination interchange. At this interchange, US 218 splits away from I-380 and Iowa 27.

Through Cedar Rapids, the I-380 freeway is elevated relative to the nearby streets and residential neighborhoods. As it approaches downtown and the Cedar River, the freeway takes a tight, 90-degree turn to the east, crosses the river and squeezes between a Quaker Oats Company plant and Alliant Energy PowerHouse, before turning back 90 degrees to the north. Between downtown and the Coldstream–29th Street interchange, I-380 serves as a dividing line between residential areas to the east and industry to the west. Toward the northern end of Cedar Rapids, industry is replaced with commerce as I-380/Iowa 27 meet Iowa 100, locally known as Collins Road, at a volleyball interchange.

The freeway leaves Cedar Rapids and enters Hiawatha, where there are two interchanges, one at Blairs Ferry Road, which shares a southbound collector ramp with Collins Road, but has its own exit and entrance ramps. There is also a diamond interchange with Tower Terrace Road, before continuing northbound. Quickly escaping the Cedar Rapids area, I-380 turns to the northwest and passes through predominantly rural areas with small communities and farms dotting the way. Because of its northwestern angle, I-380 enters four counties within 30 miles (48 km), as counties in Iowa are generally rectangular in shape. It passes Center Point in northwestern Linn County, Urbana in northeastern Benton County, where it meets Iowa 150, and Brandon in southwestern Buchanan County. The Interstate travels into Black Hawk County, heading northwest for seven miles (11 km) before turning north for three miles (4.8 km) until a directional T interchange with US 20.

Together with US 20, I-380 and Iowa 27 travel west toward Waterloo and Cedar Falls. The three routes pass the eastern Waterloo suburbs of Raymond, Evansdale, and Elk Run Heights. Almost immediately after crossing the Cedar River again, I-380 splits away from US 20 and Iowa 27 and rejoins US 218 at a three-level stack interchange. I-380 and US 218 head north to the east of the Crossroads Center shopping mall. I-380 ends at the traffic light at Mitchell Avenue one-half mile (800 m) north of the interchange which serves the Crossroads Center. US 218 continues to the north at this point.

== History ==
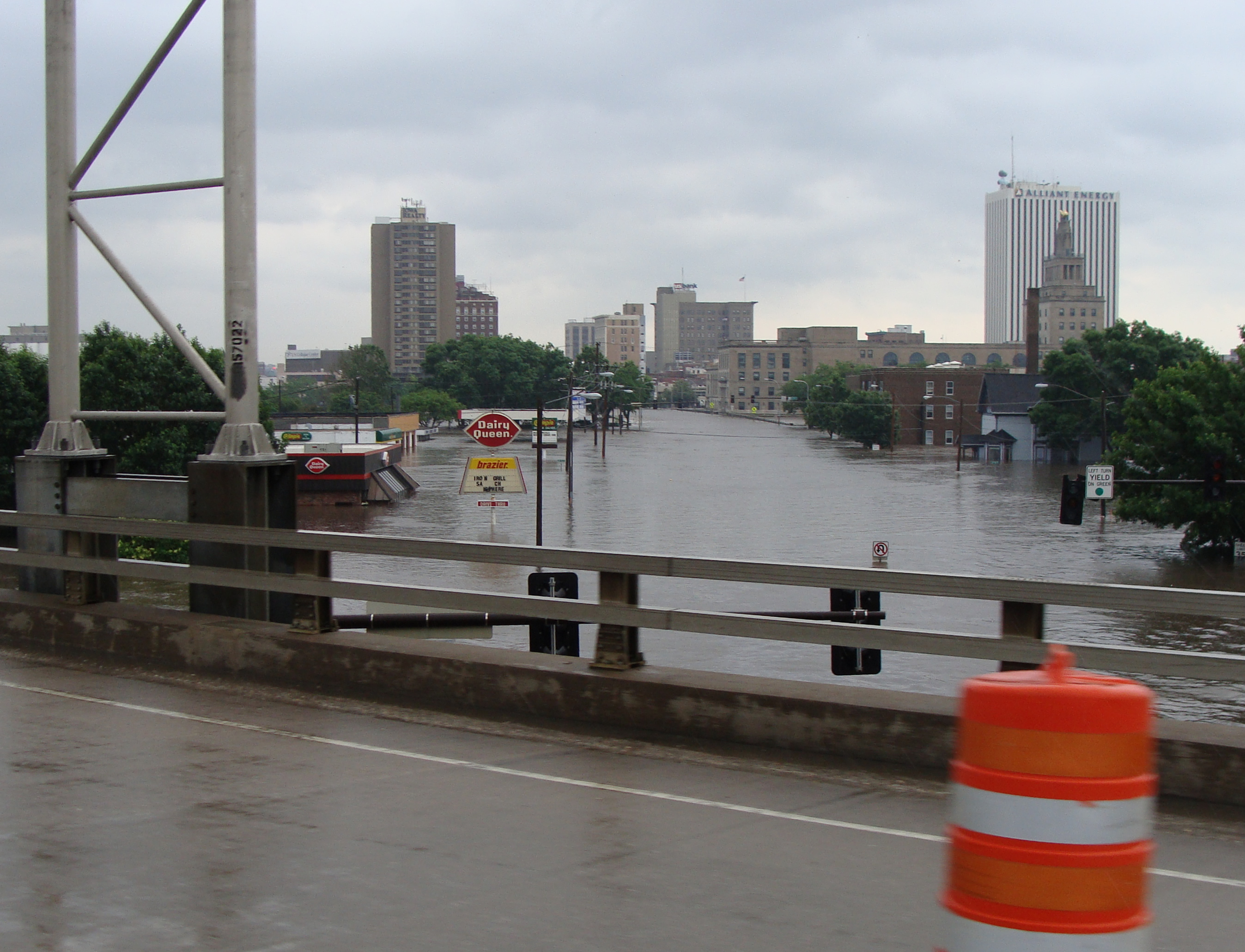
A view of Cedar Rapids from I-380 during the 2008 flood

The first section of I-380 opened to traffic on September 19, 1973. That section connected Eastern Iowa Airport to I-80 at Coralville. Within three years, the Interstate had been extended into Cedar Rapids at the Cedar River. The bridge which crossed the river would not open until June 1979. By the end of 1981, I-380 was a continuous road to the Coldstream Avenue/Glass Road interchange. The Interstate was originally scheduled to be open by December 25, 1984, but weather delays pushed back the construction timetable. The last section of I-380 to be completed opened on September 12, 1985.

In 1985, US 218 was bypassed around Iowa City and Coralville, joining I-380 at the I-80 interchange. US 218 to Cedar Rapids was replaced by Iowa 965. In the early 1990s, most of I-380 was designated as part of the Avenue of the Saints corridor, which connects Saint Louis, Missouri, to Saint Paul, Minnesota. Avenue of the Saints route markers were erected along the route the next year. In August 2001, the Avenue of the Saints in Iowa was given a single designation, Iowa 27, to facilitate following the route through the state.

In 2019, the Iowa Department of Transportation (Iowa DOT) began reconstructing I-80/I-380 interchange from its originally designed cloverleaf interchange into a turbine interchange. During the construction process in March 2021, the eastbound ramps from I-80 utilized the new flyover bridges while transit from northbound US 218 to westbound I-80 required a detour via the next interchange at Forevergreen Road. The Iowa DOT projected frequent night closures of portions of the interchange to continue until completion of the upgrade, which was set to be completed in 2025. However, the project was completed well ahead of schedule in late-August 2023.

=== Flooding ===
I-380 crosses two of Iowa's major rivers, the Iowa and Cedar rivers. Both rivers have affected the Interstate during major floods, as the case was in 1993 and 2008. During the Great Flood of 1993, I-380 and Iowa 965 were both closed at the Iowa River's Coralville Lake reservoir between July 13 and 28. The roads reopened after the lake's waters receded enough to allow Iowa DOT inspectors to check the three bridges over the water.

The Iowa flood of 2008 affected the same section of I-380 at the Iowa River in much the same fashion as in 1993. I-380 and former Iowa 965 were closed at the Iowa River on June 13 until July 3. In Cedar Rapids, flooding did not close I-380; the only bridge not to close, though traffic was restricted through the city. The flooding damage was much more severe in Cedar Rapids than in Iowa City. The Cedar River crested at over 31 feet (9.4 m) on June 13, causing hundreds of millions of dollars in damage.

== Future ==
In the Summer of 2024, IDOT began a $112 million project to repair roads and build additional lanes along I-380 from north of North Liberty to Cedar Rapids. A new diverging diamond interchange is also being built at Wright Brothers Boulevard near the Eastern Iowa Airport.

== Exit list ==
County	Location	mi	km	Exit	Destinations	Notes
Johnson	Coralville	0.000	0.000		US 218 south / Iowa 27 south – Mount Pleasant, Keokuk	Southern end of US 218/Iowa 27/AOTS overlap; continuation south of interchange
Johnson	Coralville	0.000	0.000	97 0	I-80 – Iowa City, Des Moines	Southern terminus and signed as exit 0, northbound exit signed as 97; I-80 exit 239
Johnson	North Liberty	2.040	3.283	2	Forevergreen Road	
Johnson	North Liberty	4.049	6.516	4	CR F28 – North Liberty	
Johnson	Jefferson Township	10.863	17.482	10	CR F12 – Swisher, Shueyville	
Linn	Cedar Rapids	13.821	22.243	13	Ely, The Eastern Iowa Airport	Former Iowa 84
Linn	Cedar Rapids	16.332	26.284	16	US 30 / US 151 / US 218 north – Mt. Vernon, Tama	Northern end of US 218 overlap; northbound exits signed 16A (eastbound) and 16B (westbound)
Linn	Cedar Rapids	17.590	28.308	17	33rd Avenue SW – Hawkeye Downs	
Linn	Cedar Rapids	18.346	29.525	18	Wilson Avenue SW	
Linn	Cedar Rapids	19.417	31.249	19A	To US 151 Bus. / Diagonal Drive / 5th Avenue SW – Downtown	Northbound exit and southbound entrance only
Linn	Cedar Rapids	19.752	31.788	19B	US 151 Bus. (1st Avenue W) – Veterans Memorial Stadium, Kingston Stadium, Ice Arena	No southbound entrance, northbound exit signed as exit 19C
Linn	Cedar Rapids	19.752	31.788	19C	1st Street W	Northbound exit only
Linn	Cedar Rapids	20.159	32.443	20A	To US 151 Bus. / 1st Street East – Downtown	No northbound exit
Linn	Cedar Rapids	20.597– 20.651	33.148– 33.235	20B	7th Street E – Alliant Energy PowerHouse	Entrances to highway are on 8th Street
Linn	Cedar Rapids	21.570	34.714	21	H Avenue, J Avenue	J Avenue only signed northbound
Linn	Cedar Rapids	22.351– 22.676	35.970– 36.493	22	Coldstream–29th Street; Glass Road – 32nd Street	
Linn	Cedar Rapids	23.377	37.622	23	42nd Street	Southbound access via exit 24B
Linn	Cedar Rapids	23.889	38.446	24A	Iowa 100 (Collins Road)	Southbound access and northbound entrance via exit 24B
Linn	Hiawatha	24.372	39.223	24B	Blairs Ferry Road	
Linn	Hiawatha	25.282	40.687	25	Boyson Road	
Linn	Hiawatha	26.381	42.456	26	Tower Terrace Road	Diverging diamond interchange (DDI) opened on June 22, 2023
Linn	Monroe Township	28.853	46.434	28	CR E34 – Toddville, Robins	
Linn	Center Point	35.836	57.672	35	CR W36 – Center Point	Former Iowa 921
Benton	Urbana	41.876	67.393	41	Urbana	Former Iowa 383
Benton	Urbana	43.545	70.079	43	Iowa 150 – Vinton, Independence	
Buchanan	Jefferson Township	49.957	80.398	49	Brandon	Former Iowa 283
Buchanan–Black Hawk county line	Jefferson–Spring Creek township line	55.360	89.093	55	CR V65 – Jesup	
Black Hawk	Fox Township	62.231	100.151	62	CR D38 – Gilbertville	
Black Hawk	Poyner Township	64.647– 65.820	104.039– 105.927	65	US 20 east – Dubuque	Southern end of US 20 overlap
Black Hawk	Poyner Township	66.495	107.013	66	Raymond, Gilbertville	Former Iowa 297
Black Hawk	Evansdale	68.402	110.082	68	Evansdale Drive – Elk Run Heights	
Black Hawk	Evansdale	70.674	113.739	70	River Forest Road	
Black Hawk	Waterloo	71.179– 71.698	114.551– 115.387	71	US 20 west / Iowa 27 north – Cedar Falls US 218 south – La Porte City	Northern end of US 20, Iowa 27, and AOTS overlaps; southern end of US 218 overlap; signed as exit 71A (US 218) and 71B (US 20/Iowa 27)
Black Hawk	Waterloo	72.390	116.500	72	San Marnan Drive	Former Iowa 412
Black Hawk	Waterloo	72.969	117.432		US 218 north / Mitchell Avenue	Northern end of US 218 overlap; continuation beyond northern end
1.000 mi = 1.609 km; 1.000 km = 0.621 mi: Concurrency terminus; Incomplete access
