= Washburn, Iowa =

- Census-designated place
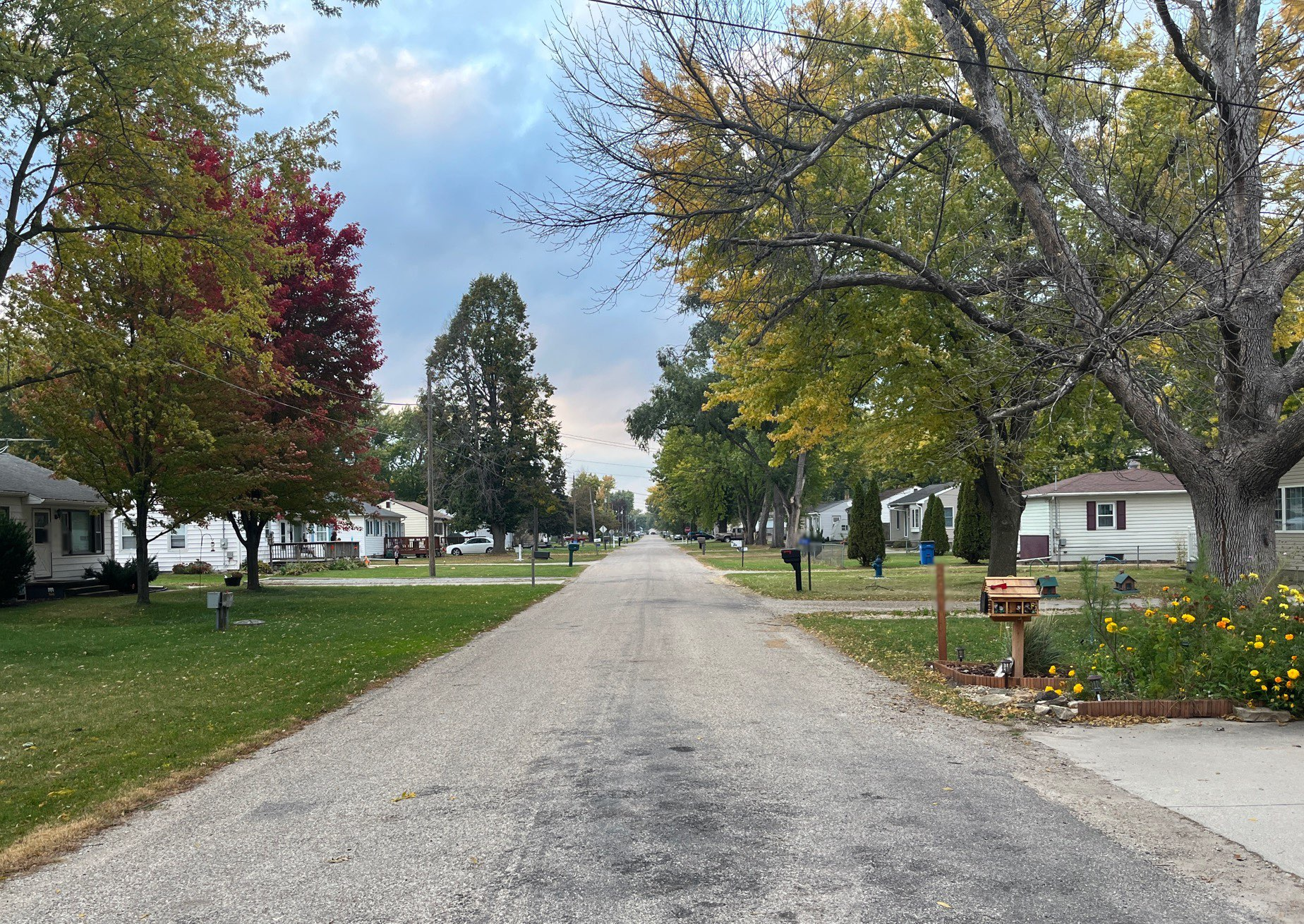
- Residential street In Washburn

- Location within the state of Iowa
- Coordinates: 42°24′40″N 92°16′07″W
- Country: United States
- State: Iowa
- County: Black Hawk

Area
  - Total: 1.25 sq mi (3.23 km^{2})
  - Land: 1.24 sq mi (3.20 km^{2})
  - Water: 0.012 sq mi (0.03 km^{2})
- Elevation: 833 ft (254 m)

Population (2020)
  - Total: 870
  - Density: 703.7/sq mi (271.71/km^{2})
- Time zone: UTC-6 (Central (CST))
  - Summer (DST): UTC-5 (CDT)
- ZIP code: 50702
- FIPS code: 19-82290
- GNIS feature ID: 2630601

Washburn is an unincorporated town and census-designated place (CDP) in Black Hawk County, Iowa, United States. Washburn lies south of Waterloo on U.S. Route 218. Other towns near Washburn are Gilbertville and La Porte City. The community is part of the Waterloo–Cedar Falls Metropolitan Statistical Area.

As of the 2020 census, Washburn had a population of 870.

== Demographics ==
Historical population
Census	Pop.	Note	%±
2010	876		—
2020	870		−0.7%
U.S. Decennial Census

=== 2020 census ===
As of the census of 2020, there were 870 people, 380 households, and 256 families residing in the community. The population density was 703.7 inhabitants per square mile (271.7/km^{2}). There were 394 housing units at an average density of 318.7 per square mile (123.1/km^{2}). The racial makeup of the community was 92.9% White, 1.5% Black or African American, 0.0% Native American, 0.3% Asian, 0.0% Pacific Islander, 0.3% from other races and 4.9% from two or more races. Hispanic or Latino persons of any race comprised 3.8% of the population.

Of the 380 households, 25.3% of which had children under the age of 18 living with them, 55.8% were married couples living together, 5.8% were cohabitating couples, 16.8% had a female householder with no spouse or partner present and 21.6% had a male householder with no spouse or partner present. 32.6% of all households were non-families. 25.3% of all households were made up of individuals, 14.5% had someone living alone who was 65 years old or older.

The median age in the community was 42.0 years. 23.6% of the residents were under the age of 20; 6.9% were between the ages of 20 and 24; 22.2% were from 25 and 44; 26.3% were from 45 and 64; and 21.0% were 65 years of age or older. The gender makeup of the community was 53.1% male and 46.9% female.

== History ==
Washburn was platted in 1880. Washburn's population was 79 in 1902, and 94 in 1925.

The 2010 census recorded a population of 876 for the Washburn CDP.

== Education ==
Washburn is in the Waterloo Community School District. It is currently serviced by Orange Elementary, Hoover Middle, and Waterloo West High.
