= Barclay Township =

Barclay Township may refer to the following townships in the United States:

- Barclay Township, Black Hawk County, Iowa
- Barclay Township, Cass County, Minnesota
