= Waterloo Community School District =

Public school district in Waterloo, Iowa, United States

Location
- Waterloo, Iowa Black Hawk County United States
- Coordinates: 42.485445°N 92.333564°W

District information
- Type: Local school district
- Grades: K-12
- Established: 1942
- Superintendent: Dr. Jared Smith
- Schools: 19
- Budget: $175,597,000 (2020-21)
- NCES District ID: 1930480

Students and staff
- Students: 10,645 (2022-23)
- Teachers: 769.91 FTE
- Staff: 867.10 FTE
- Student–teacher ratio: 13.83
- Athletic conference: Mississippi Valley (Waterloo West); Iowa Alliance (Waterloo East)

Other information
- Website: www.waterlooschools.org

Waterloo Community School District (WCSD) is a public school district headquartered in Waterloo, Iowa.

It is entirely in Black Hawk County. In addition to almost all of Waterloo the municipalities of Elk Run Heights, Evansdale, Gilbertville, and Raymond are in the district limits, as well as the census-designated place of Washburn. It also covers a portion of Cedar Falls.

There was originally a single school district in Waterloo, but in 1866 the district split in two, with a Waterloo and an East Waterloo district, until 1942, when they merged into the Independent School District of Waterloo.

== History ==
In 2015 the district drew up plans for a school bond with a value of $47 million.

In 2023 the district revealed that it planned to build a consolidated high school. In July 2024, these plans were formally approved by the Waterloo Community School Board. On 8 October 2025, the new school, mascot, and colors were officially announced. The school will be called Waterloo United High School, and their mascot will be the Titans. Colors will be black and Vegas Gold. The athletics conference affiliation is yet to be determined. The new high school will be located at the current Central Middle School and Waterloo Career Center.

== Schools ==
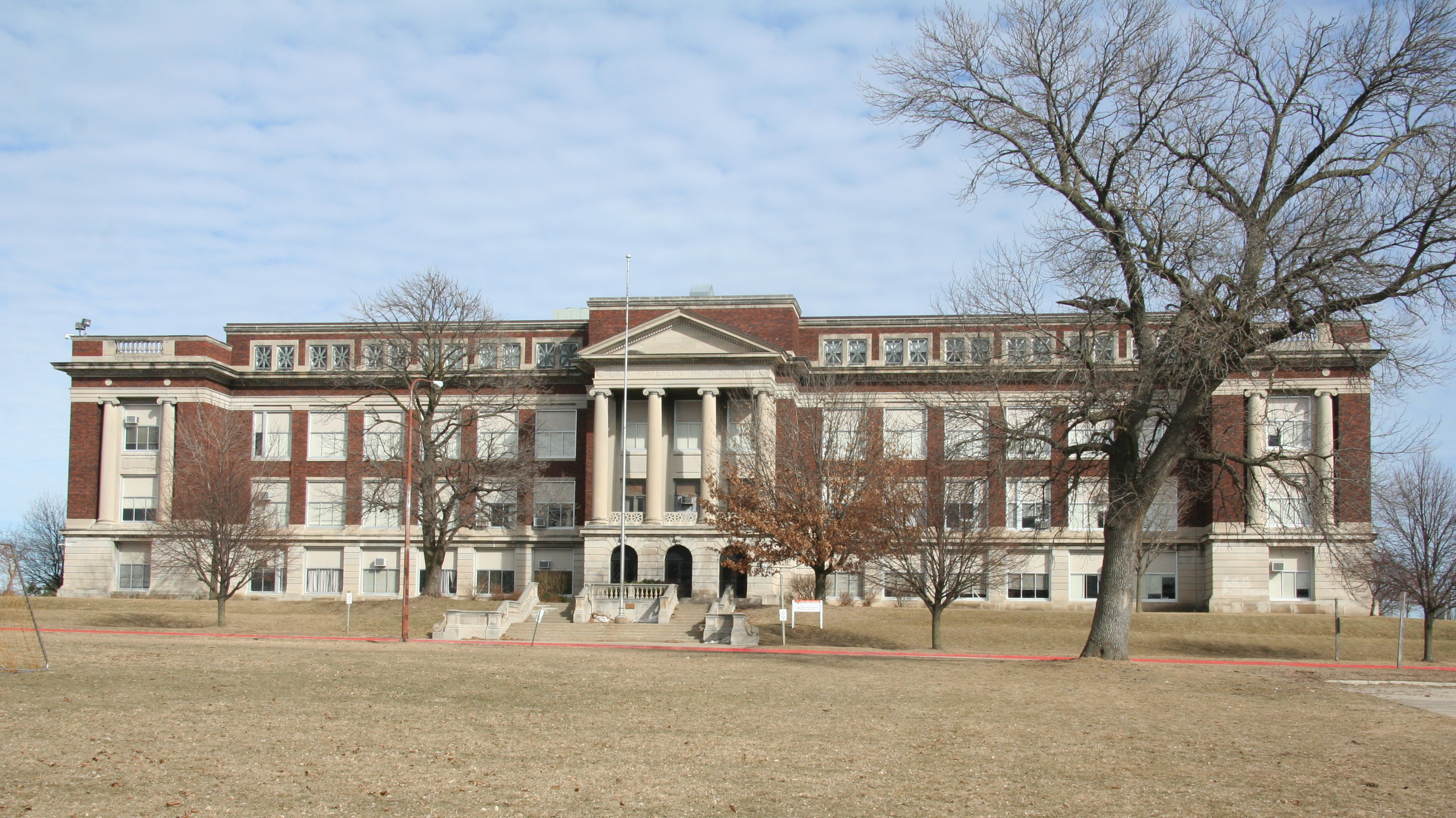
Waterloo East High School

=== High ===
- Waterloo East
- Waterloo West
- Waterloo Career Center

=== Middle ===
- Bunger Middle School (Evansdale)
- Central Middle School
- George Washington Carver Academy
- Hoover Middle School

=== Elementary / PreSchools ===
- Fred Becker Elementary School
- Dr. Walter Cunningham School for Excellence
- Lou Henry Elementary School
- Highland Elementary School
- Irving Elementary School
- Kingsley Elementary School
- Kittrell Elementary School
- Lincoln Elementary School
- Lou Henry Elementary School
- Lowell Elementary School
- Orange Elementary School
- Poyner Elementary School (Evansdale) - Located on the site of the former St. Nicholas Catholic Church.
- Elk Run PreSchool [permanently closed]

== See also ==
- List of school districts in Iowa
