= Benson, Iowa =

- Unincorporated community
- Location within Iowa
- Coordinates: 42°32′33″N 92°32′32″W
- Country: United States
- State: Iowa
- County: Black Hawk
- Elevation: 906 ft (276 m)
- Time zone: UTC-6 (Central (CST))
  - Summer (DST): UTC-5 (CDT)
- GNIS feature ID: 464458

Benson is an unincorporated community in Black Hawk County, in the U.S. state of Iowa.

== Geography ==
Benson was located in Cedar Falls Township.

== History ==
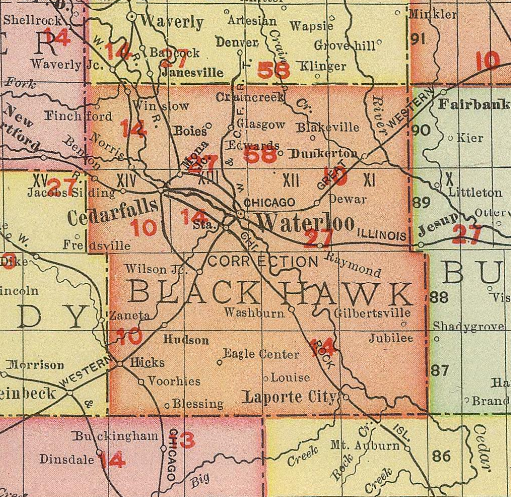
Benson in Black Hawk County, Iowa, in 1903

Benson was founded on the Illinois Central Railroad in Cedar Falls Township. In the early 20th century, Benson was home to a blacksmith shop, a general store, and a dairy. Around this time, Benson was described as a "very small village" in The History of Black Hawk County, Iowa. The Benson school (#2 in the township) had two teachers.

Benson's population was 25 in 1900.

The community also had a lumber yard and a coal dealer. In 1906, the rail line at Benson was abandoned in favor of another Illinois Central Rail route, causing the closure of the depot in Benson. Despite a $15,000 lawsuit filed by three Benson businesses (citizens Lumber Company, S.C. Canfield Coal company, and Lee Canfield general merchandise), representatives from the Illinois Central Railroad maintained that business was not sufficient to keep the depot in operation.

The population of Benson was 35 in 1920, and in 1940 was 25.

== See also ==
Voorhies, Iowa
