= Black Hawk County Courthouse (Iowa) =

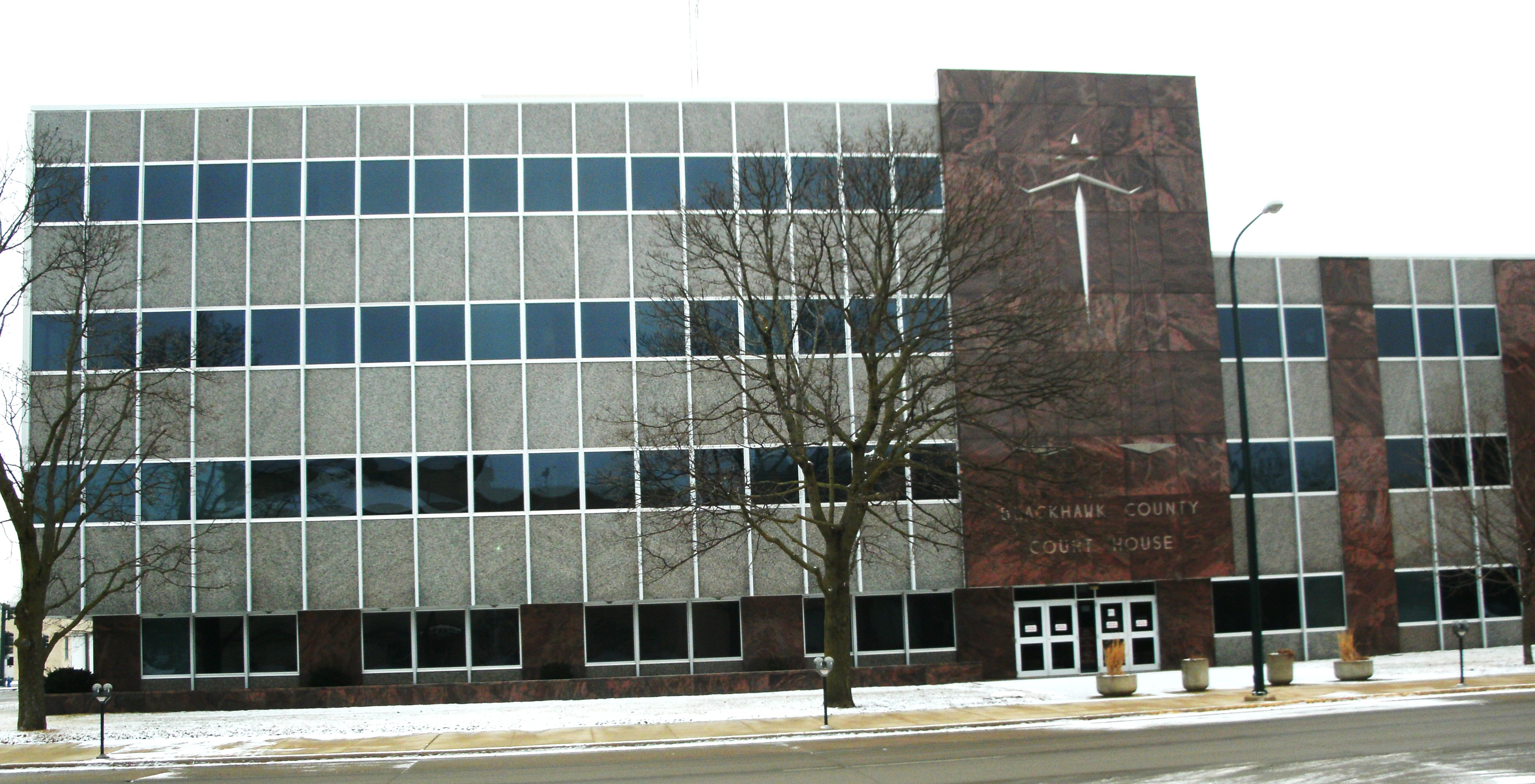
- Black Hawk County Courthouse
- Interactive map of the Black Hawk County Courthouse area

General information
- Type: Courthouse
- Architectural style: International Style
- Location: 316 E. 5th St., Waterloo, Iowa, United States
- Coordinates: 42.498551°N 92.333080°W
- Completed: 1964

Technical details
- Floor count: Four

Other information
- Public transit access: 4 5 MET Transit

The Black Hawk County Courthouse is located in downtown Waterloo, Iowa, United States. It is the third dedicated courthouse to house the county's offices since it was created in 1843.

== History ==
Cedar Falls was Black Hawk County's first county seat. The county never had a courthouse there, but instead, rented office space for its needs. The Black Hawk County Board of Commissioners decided to move the county seat to Waterloo on December 10, 1855. Judge John Randall was given the authority to build the county's first courthouse and to decide its location. A contract for its construction was let for $12,747.61, but its final costs came in at about $27,000. The two-story Federal-style building featured a cupola and six massive two-story pillars on the main facade. The first attempt to replace the original courthouse was defeated on November 8, 1898, but a resolution passed for a new courthouse and jail on November 6, 1900. The two-story Beaux Arts structure was built on a raised basement. It featured a central tower capped with a dome and a single-story portico over the main entrance. It was dedicated in the autumn of 1902, and the old courthouse was demolished five years later.

The current facility opened in August 1964 and replaced the 1902 structure, which had become inadequate. The building contains 101,700 square feet (9,400 m^{2}) of space, and its exterior is composed of polished red and black stone. It was built for $2,850,000. At the time of opening, it housed all county offices including the sheriff and jail, which moved to their own facility across Lafayette Street in 1995.
