= Crossroads Center =

Crossroads Center may refer to:

- Crossroads Center (St. Cloud, Minnesota)
- Crossroads Center (Waterloo, Iowa)
