= Blessing, Iowa =

Historical community

- Unincorporated community
- Location within Iowa
- Coordinates: 42°18′42″N 92°27′22″W
- Country: United States
- State: Iowa
- County: Black Hawk
- Elevation: 997 ft (304 m)
- Time zone: UTC-6 (Central (CST))
  - Summer (DST): UTC-5 (CDT)
- Area code: 319
- GNIS feature ID: 464152

Blessing is a historical unincorporated community in the southern portion of Black Hawk County, Iowa, United States.

== History ==
Blessing was named after James J. Blessington.

In 1882 a Roman Catholic church was built in Blessing by Fr. O'Brien, resident priest at Eagle Center. The Church was attached to Eagle Center as a mission until 1892, when Fr. Sheehy arrived as a resident pastor. The use of the church as a Roman Catholic parish was discontinued, however Blessing Cemetery remains an active cemetery.

Blessing's population was 25 in 1902.
