= Crossroads Mall (Waterloo, Iowa) =

Crossroads Center
- Location: Waterloo, Iowa, United States
- Coordinates: 42.462°N 92.322°W
- Opened: March 1970; 56 years ago
- Closed: December 2025; 11 months ago (demolition began in January 2026)
- Developer: Crossroads Center Inc.
- Manager: ATI Group
- Owner: ATI Group
- Num. of anchor tenants: 5 (all vacant)
- Floor area: 847,099 sq ft (78,698.1 m^{2})
- Floors: 2
- Public transit: 5 10 MET Transit
- Website: shopcrossroadscenter.com

Crossroads Center was a shopping mall located in Waterloo, Iowa, United States. It was built in 1970 as one of the first malls in Iowa. It has five vacant anchors formerly occupied by Sears, Dillard's, Gordmans, Younkers, and At Home. It is owned by ATI Group. It is located in the heart of a retail hub that includes a 12 screen theater, Best Buy, Super Target (opened 2000), Walmart, Barnes & Noble, and many other national tenants. The mall is located near the interchange of Interstate 380 and U.S. Highway 20.

== History ==
Crossroads Center Inc. announced plans for the mall in 1967, along with two other malls of the same name: one in St. Cloud, Minnesota and one in Fort Dodge, Iowa.

The Sears anchor store opened first, on March 24, 1969. The mall itself opened one year later, in March 1970, as the only two-story mall in Iowa. The JCPenney anchor store opened along with the mall, as did Black's department store. Black's became Donaldson's in 1978 and then Carson Pirie Scott in 1987. The store closed on September 30, 1989.

The upper level of the JCPenney anchor store was converted to a Herberger's anchor store in 1989. In 1991, Sears rented a 57,000 sq ft portion of its anchor store to become a Phar-Mor pharmacy. In 1993, 1/2 Price Store (later renamed Gordmans) took over that space. Herberger's was renamed Younkers in 1997. The mall was renovated in 1997 at a cost of $4 million. At the same time, Dillard's constructed a new 155,000 sq ft anchor store connected to the mall, at a cost of $20 million, rather than leasing space. The Dillard's anchor store opened on August 13, 1997. All 1/2 Price Store locations were renamed Gordmans in 2000.

=== Decline, closure and demolition ===
On January 8, 2015, it was announced that JCPenney would close, as part of a plan to close 39 locations nationwide. At Home replaced the store in 2016. On January 4, 2018, it was announced that Sears would close, as part of a plan to close 103 stores nationwide. The store closed in April 2018. On April 18, 2018, Younkers parent company, the Bon-Ton, announced they would be completely liquidating and closing all stores including the one at Crossroads. The store closed on August 29, 2018. On May 11, 2020, Gordmans announced that it would be closing as the parent company is also going out of business. Just eight days later, Dillard's announced that this location would close. This left At Home as the only traditional anchor store. On August 2, 2023, it was announced that At Home would be closing by November 2023, which left the mall with no anchors. The mall closed in December 2025 when its last remaining tenant, a pizza restaurant, reached the end of its lease, with demolition beginning in January 2026 to make way for a mixed use retail/housing development.
