= Iowa Highway 965 =

State highway in Iowa, United States

Iowa Highway 965
- Coral Ridge Avenue
- Iowa 965 highlighted in red

Route information
- Maintained by Iowa DOT
- Length: 0.382 mi (615 m)
- Existed: June 26, 1985–present

Major junctions
- South end: US 6 in Coralville
- North end: I-80 in Coralville

Location
- Country: United States
- State: Iowa
- Counties: Johnson

Highway system
- Iowa Primary Highway System; Interstate; US; State; Secondary; Scenic
← Iowa 960	→ Iowa 1

Iowa Highway 965 (Iowa 965) is a very short state highway in Coralville, Iowa that connects U.S. Highway 6 (US 6) to Interstate 80 (I-80) as there is no direct access between the two routes. Prior to 2003, Iowa 965 was a much longer route, extending to Cedar Rapids along the former alignment of US 218 (which now follows the parallel I-380).

== Route description ==
Iowa 965 begins at a T-intersection with U.S. Route 6 on the southwestern edge of Coralville along Coral Ridge Avenue. On the east side of Coral Ridge Avenue is Coral Ridge Mall, a super-regional shopping center. There are two access roads from Iowa 965 to Coral Ridge Mall, one of which is connected to the eastbound exit ramp from Interstate 80. Iowa 965 intersects the I-80 eastbound entrance ramp passes beneath the main interstate. The Iowa 965 designation ends at the intersection of the entrance and exit ramps for westbound I-80. Iowa 965 is signed as "TO US 6" from Interstate 80. Iowa 965 continued north through a developing part of Coralville towards North Liberty. Despite Coralville and North Liberty sharing a city limit boundary, farmland still existed between the two communities. In North Liberty, former Iowa 965 is still known as Highway 965. Before turning to the northwest, Highway 965 crossed a Cedar Rapids and Iowa City Railway (Crandic) line. North of North Liberty, Iowa 965, officially known as Johnson County Road W60, entered the Coralville Lake basin. Highway 965 and the Crandic line passed beneath Interstate 380 just before crossing the Iowa River.

North of the Iowa River, Iowa 965 straightened out and headed due north towards Swisher, intersecting Johnson County Road F12. It entered Linn County, where it is no farther than 600 yards (550 m) away from Interstate 380 until the former Iowa 965's northern end in Cedar Rapids. Shortly after entering Linn County, the highway entered the Cedar Rapids city limits. Sixth Street SW, as it is known in Cedar Rapids, intersects Wright Brothers Blvd SW, formerly Iowa Highway 84, which connects to The Eastern Iowa Airport. As Cedar Rapids nears, Sixth Street SW passes through a light industrial zone, flanked to the west by an Archer Daniels Midland corn processing plant. Prior to 2003, Iowa Highway 965 ended at an interchange with US 30 / US 151 / US 218.

== History ==
Current Iowa 965 highlighted in red and the former extent highlighted in gray

Iowa Highway 965 was designated on June 26, 1985, replacing a relocated segment of U.S. Route 218. With the construction of Interstate 380, an adjoining segment of freeway was built south of Interstate 80 around the west side of Iowa City. When it was finished, US 218 was relocated onto the new segment and onto I-380. In 1994, Iowa 965 was turned over to the city of North Liberty, creating two segments of Iowa 965. On July 1, 2003, the remainder of Iowa 965 in Johnson County was turned over to the county. In 2004, the Linn County section was turned over.

During the Iowa flood of 2008, flood waters approached and closed the I-380 and Highway 965 bridges. The Highway 965 bridge reopened to traffic on July 3, 2008, after closing on June 13, 2008.

== Major intersections ==
The entire route is in Coralville, Johnson County.

mi	km	Destinations	Notes
0.000	0.000	US 6 (2nd Street) – Coralville, Iowa City, Marengo	
0.382	0.615	I-80 – Davenport, Des Moines	
1.000 mi = 1.609 km; 1.000 km = 0.621 mi
