= Finchford, Iowa =

- Unincorporated community
- Location within Iowa
- Coordinates: 42°37′38″N 92°32′38″W
- Country: United States
- State: Iowa
- County: Black Hawk
- Elevation: 886 ft (270 m)
- Time zone: UTC-6 (Central (CST))
  - Summer (DST): UTC-5 (CDT)
- Area code: 319
- GNIS feature ID: 456590

Finchford is an unincorporated community in Union Township, Black Hawk County, Iowa, United States. The community is at the intersection of county highways C55 and T71, 4.5 miles (7.2 km) west-southwest of Janesville.

== History ==
Finchford's population was 50 in 1887, and was 36 in 1902. The population was 75 in 1940.
