= George W. Lucas (politician) =

American politician (1807–1881)

George Washington Lucas (9 December 1807 – 30 December 1881) was an American politician.

Lucas was born on 9 December 1807 in Scioto County, Ohio. He moved to Greene County, Illinois, where he met and married Jane Spalding on 19 December 1833. The couple had eight children, and later moved to Fremont County, Iowa. While living in Fremont County, Lucas was elected to the Iowa Senate between 1852 and 1856, as a Democratic legislator for District 11. At the time, the district included the counties of Fremont, Mills, Montgomery, Adams, Union, Ringgold, Taylor, and Page. Lucas was the state senator responsible for introducing the bill that moved Iowa's capital from Iowa City to Des Moines. Lucas died on 30 December 1881 in Holt County, Missouri.
