= East Waterloo Township, Iowa =

Township in Iowa, US

East Waterloo Township, Black Hawk County
- Township
- Coordinates: 42°30′40″N 092°15′56″W
- Country: United States
- State: Iowa
- County: Black Hawk

Area
  - Total: 14.81 sq mi (38.36 km^{2})
  - Land: 14.68 sq mi (38.03 km^{2})
  - Water: 0.13 sq mi (0.34 km^{2})
- Elevation: 890 ft (270 m)

Population (2000)
  - Total: 5,936
  - Density: 404/sq mi (156.1/km^{2})
- FIPS code: 19-91128
- GNIS feature ID: 0467759

East Waterloo Township is one of seventeen rural townships in Black Hawk County, Iowa, United States. As of the 2000 census, its population was 5936.

== Geography ==
East Waterloo Township covers an area of 14.81 square miles (38.4 km^{2}) and contains two incorporated settlements: Elk Run Heights and Evansdale. According to the USGS, it contains two cemeteries: George Wyth Memorial State Park and Mount Zion.
