= West High School (Waterloo, Iowa) =

Public secondary school in Waterloo, Iowa, United States

Waterloo West High School

Location
- 425 East Ridgeway Avenue; Waterloo, Iowa 50702; United States; 42°28′12″N 92°21′04″W

Information
- Type: Public High School
- Established: 1922
- School district: Waterloo Community School District
- Principal: Brian Ortman
- Staff: 99.12 (FTE)
- Grades: 9–12
- Enrollment: 1,713 (2023-2024)
- Student to teacher ratio: 17.28
- Colors: Old Rose and black
- Nickname: Wahawks
- Affiliation: Mississippi Valley Conference
- Website: www.waterlooschools.org/schoolsites/westhigh/

Waterloo West High School is one of three public high schools under the auspices of the Waterloo Community School District in Waterloo, Iowa. The school is located at the intersection of E. Ridgeway Ave. and Baltimore Ave.

== Mascot ==
The school mascot is Westy the Wahawk. The name "Wahawk" is a portmanteau of the city name (Waterloo) and the county name (Black Hawk). Much controversy has surrounded the mascot, which was once an Indian chief thought to be politically incorrect. It was later changed to a flying eagle flying through a flaming hoop but was changed back after 3 years.

The logo is currently the "Flying W," a capital "W" with a feather hanging off of it. More recently an arrow has been added behind the "Flying W". This is also the only school in the United States with "Old Rose" as its school color.

== Demographics ==
In the 2015–2016 school year, West High had an enrollment of 1,638 students. The racial makeup of the school during the 2015–2016 school year was 60% White, 18.5% African-American, 10% Hispanic, 4.6% Multiracial, 4.5% Asian and 2.4% from other races.

== Athletics ==
The Wahawks compete in the Mississippi Valley Conference in the following sports:

- Cross Country
- Volleyball
- Football
- Basketball
  - Boys' 1925 Class A State Champions
- Wrestling
  - 17-time State Champions (1942, 1943, 1944, 1945, 1946, 1951, 1952, 1955, 1959, 1965, 1966, 1967, 1969, 1971, 1972, 1977, 1989)
- Swimming
- Track and Field
  - Boys' 1981 Class AA State Champions
- Golf
  - Boys' 10-time State Champions (1950, 1951, 1955, 1956, 1957, 1971, 1972, 1973, 1977, 1998)
  - Girls' 4-time State Champions (1956, 1957, 1981, 1993)
  - Coed 5-time State Champions (1972, 1973, 1980, 1981, 1985)
- Soccer
- Softball
- Baseball
  - 1991 Class 4A State Champions
- Tennis
  - Boys' 1991 Class 2A State Champions
- Bowling
  - Girls' 2013 Class 2A State Champions
  - Boys' 2-time Class 3A State Champions (2020, 2023)

== Notable alumni ==
- David L. Baker, Iowa Supreme Court justice
- Bob Bowlsby, Big 12 Conference commissioner (2012–current), athletic director at Stanford University (2006–2012) University of Iowa (1990–2006).
- Dan Gable, 1972 Olympic gold medalist in freestyle wrestling at 1972 Summer Olympics, former head wrestling coach at University of Iowa.
- Molly Goodenbour, women's basketball coach, University of San Francisco
- Nikole Hannah-Jones, journalist
- Don Perkins, former professional football player, Pro Bowl running back for Dallas Cowboys
- Cal Petersen, American professional ice hockey player
- Jack Rule, Jr., former professional golfer who played on PGA Tour in 1960s
- Mike van Arsdale, retired mixed martial artist; current MMA coach
- Emily West, country music singer-songwriter, signed with Capitol Records; America's Got Talent (season 9) runner up

== See also ==
- List of high schools in Iowa
