= Black Hawk Township, Black Hawk County, Iowa =

Township in Iowa, US

Black Hawk Township, Black Hawk County
- Township
- Coordinates: 42°25′02″N 092°28′20″W
- Country: United States
- State: Iowa
- County: Black Hawk

Area
  - Total: 31.37 sq mi (81.25 km^{2})
  - Land: 31.37 sq mi (81.24 km^{2})
  - Water: 0.0077 sq mi (0.02 km^{2})
- Elevation: 906 ft (276 m)

Population (2000)
  - Total: 2,494
  - Density: 80/sq mi (30.7/km^{2})
- FIPS code: 19-90246
- GNIS feature ID: 0467455

Black Hawk Township is one of seventeen rural townships in Black Hawk County, Iowa, United States. As of the 2000 census, its population was 2,494.

== Geography ==
Black Hawk Township covers an area of 31.37 square miles (81.2 km^{2}) and contains one incorporated settlement, Hudson. According to the USGS, it contains three cemeteries: Cedar Valley, Hudson and Zion Lutheran.
