= Lester Township, Black Hawk County, Iowa =

Township in Iowa, US

Lester Township, Black Hawk County
- Township
- Coordinates: 42°35′38″N 092°08′21″W
- Country: United States
- State: Iowa
- County: Black Hawk

Area
  - Total: 35.86 sq mi (92.87 km^{2})
  - Land: 35.83 sq mi (92.79 km^{2})
  - Water: 0.027 sq mi (0.07 km^{2})
- Elevation: 945 ft (288 m)

Population (2000)
  - Total: 1,504
  - Density: 42/sq mi (16.2/km^{2})
- FIPS code: 19-92427
- GNIS feature ID: 0468208

Lester Township is one of seventeen rural townships in Black Hawk County, Iowa, United States. As of the 2000 census, its population was 1504.

== Geography ==
Lester Township covers an area of 35.86 square miles (92.9 km^{2}) and contains one incorporated settlement, Dunkerton. According to the USGS, it contains two cemeteries: Fairview-Lester and Lester Township.
