= Big Creek Township, Black Hawk County, Iowa =

Township in Iowa, US

Big Creek Township, Black Hawk County
- Township
- Coordinates: 42°19′09″N 092°12′48″W
- Country: United States
- State: Iowa
- County: Black Hawk

Area
  - Total: 25.85 sq mi (66.96 km^{2})
  - Land: 25.40 sq mi (65.78 km^{2})
  - Water: 0.46 sq mi (1.18 km^{2})
- Elevation: 869 ft (265 m)

Population (2000)
  - Total: 2,640
  - Density: 104/sq mi (40.1/km^{2})
- FIPS code: 19-90234
- GNIS feature ID: 0467451

Big Creek Township is one of seventeen rural townships in Black Hawk County, Iowa, United States. As of the 2000 census, its population was 2640.

== Geography ==
Big Creek Township covers an area of 25.86 square miles (67.0 km^{2}) and contains one incorporated settlement, La Porte City. According to the USGS, it contains one cemetery, Westview.
