= Bennington Township, Black Hawk County, Iowa =

Township in Iowa, US

Bennington Township, Black Hawk County
- Township
- Coordinates: 42°36′07″N 092°14′56″W
- Country: United States
- State: Iowa
- County: Black Hawk

Area
  - Total: 36.06 sq mi (93.39 km^{2})
  - Land: 36.06 sq mi (93.39 km^{2})
  - Water: 0 sq mi (0 km^{2})
- Elevation: 994 ft (303 m)

Population (2000)
  - Total: 500
  - Density: 14/sq mi (5.4/km^{2})
- FIPS code: 19-90198
- GNIS feature ID: 0467439

Bennington Township is one of seventeen rural townships in Black Hawk County, Iowa, United States. As of the 2000 census, its population was 500.

== Geography ==
Bennington Township covers an area of 36.06 square miles (93.4 km^{2}) and contains no incorporated settlements. According to the USGS, it contains five cemeteries: Bennington Township, Gresham, Pioneer, Saint John's Evangelical Lutheran Church and Saint Johns Lutheran.
