= Cedar Township, Black Hawk County, Iowa =

Township in Iowa, US

Cedar Township, Black Hawk County
- Township
- Coordinates: 42°22′53″N 092°15′26″W
- Country: United States
- State: Iowa
- County: Black Hawk

Area
  - Total: 28.09 sq mi (72.74 km^{2})
  - Land: 27.3 sq mi (70.8 km^{2})
  - Water: 0.75 sq mi (1.95 km^{2})
- Elevation: 830 ft (253 m)

Population (2000)
  - Total: 1,761
  - Density: 64/sq mi (24.9/km^{2})
- FIPS code: 19-90525
- GNIS feature ID: 0467549

Cedar Township is one of seventeen rural townships in Black Hawk County, Iowa, United States. As of the 2000 census, its population was 1761.

== Geography ==
Cedar Township covers an area of 28.09 square miles (72.8 km^{2}) and contains no incorporated settlements. According to the USGS, it contains two cemeteries: Anton and Washburn.
