= Poyner Township, Black Hawk County, Iowa =

Township in Iowa, US

Poyner Township, Black Hawk County
- Township
- Coordinates: 42°27′42″N 092°12′56″W
- Country: United States
- State: Iowa
- County: Black Hawk

Area
  - Total: 35.26 sq mi (91.33 km^{2})
  - Land: 34.79 sq mi (90.11 km^{2})
  - Water: 0.47 sq mi (1.22 km^{2})
- Elevation: 863 ft (263 m)

Population (2000)
  - Total: 2,581
  - Density: 74/sq mi (28.6/km^{2})
- FIPS code: 19-93477
- GNIS feature ID: 0468567

Poyner Township is one of seventeen rural townships in Black Hawk County, Iowa, United States. As of the 2000 census, its population was 2,581.

== History ==
The township was named for Nathan Poyner, a pioneer minister.

== Geography ==
Poyner Township covers an area of 35.26 square miles (91.3 km^{2}) and contains two incorporated settlements: Gilbertville and Raymond. According to the USGS, it contains four cemeteries: Poyner Township, Saint Joseph's, Saint Mary's and Saint Mary's Catholic.
