= Washington Township, Black Hawk County, Iowa =

Township in Iowa, US

Washington Township, Black Hawk County
- Township
- Coordinates: 42°36′23″N 092°27′52″W
- Country: United States
- State: Iowa
- County: Black Hawk

Area
  - Total: 15.0 sq mi (38.8 km^{2})
  - Land: 14.61 sq mi (37.83 km^{2})
  - Water: 0.37 sq mi (0.97 km^{2})
- Elevation: 879 ft (268 m)

Population (2000)
  - Total: 647
  - Density: 44/sq mi (17.1/km^{2})
- FIPS code: 19-94452
- GNIS feature ID: 0468902

Washington Township is one of seventeen rural townships in Black Hawk County, Iowa, United States. As of the 2000 census, its population was 647.

== Geography ==
Washington Township covers an area of 14.98 square miles (38.8 km^{2}) and contains no incorporated settlements. According to the USGS, it contains four cemeteries: Cedar Valley Memorial Gardens, Highland, Newell and Washington Chapel.
