= Mount Vernon Township, Black Hawk County, Iowa =

Township in Iowa, US

Mount Vernon Township, Black Hawk County
- Township
- Coordinates: 42°36′26″N 092°23′12″W
- Country: United States
- State: Iowa
- County: Black Hawk

Area
  - Total: 31.68 sq mi (82.06 km^{2})
  - Land: 31.68 sq mi (82.06 km^{2})
  - Water: 0 sq mi (0 km^{2})
- Elevation: 920 ft (280 m)

Population (2000)
  - Total: 1,098
  - Density: 35/sq mi (13.4/km^{2})
- FIPS code: 19-93039
- GNIS feature ID: 0468418

Mount Vernon Township is one of seventeen rural townships in Black Hawk County, Iowa, United States. As of the 2000 census, its population was 1098.

== Geography ==
Mount Vernon Township covers an area of 31.68 square miles (82.1 km^{2}) and contains no incorporated settlements. According to the USGS, it contains four cemeteries: East Janesville, Mount Vernon Evangelical, Saint Paul United Church of Christ and Saint Pauls.
