= Dewar, Iowa =

- Unincorporated town
- Location within the state of Iowa Dewar, Iowa (the United States)
- Coordinates: 42°31′32″N 92°13′09″W
- Country: United States
- State: Iowa
- County: Black Hawk
- Elevation: 889 ft (271 m)
- Time zone: UTC-6 (Central (CST))
  - Summer (DST): UTC-5 (CDT)
- ZIP codes: 50623
- Area code: 319
- GNIS feature ID: 455900

Dewar is an unincorporated town in eastern Black Hawk County, Iowa, United States. It lies northeast of the city of Waterloo, the county seat of Black Hawk County. Although Dewar is unincorporated, it has a post office with the ZIP code of 50623, which opened on 25 October 1887.

== History ==
Dewar (formerly known as Emert) was platted in 1888. Dewar's population was 22 in 1902, and 40 in 1925. The population was 84 in 1940.
