= Union Township, Black Hawk County, Iowa =

Township in Iowa, US

Union Township, Black Hawk County
- Township
- Coordinates: 42°36′24″N 092°31′32″W
- Country: United States
- State: Iowa
- County: Black Hawk

Area
  - Total: 18.27 sq mi (47.33 km^{2})
  - Land: 18.0 sq mi (46.7 km^{2})
  - Water: 0.24 sq mi (0.63 km^{2})
- Elevation: 945 ft (288 m)

Population (2000)
  - Total: 941
  - Density: 52/sq mi (20.1/km^{2})
- FIPS code: 19-94173
- GNIS feature ID: 0468809

Union Township is one of seventeen rural townships in Black Hawk County, Iowa, United States. As of the 2000 census, its population was 941.

== Geography ==
Union Township covers an area of 18.27 square miles (47.3 km^{2}) and contains no incorporated settlements. According to the USGS, it contains three cemeteries: Finchford, Finchford Cemetery and Gerholdt.
