= Metropolitan Transit Authority of Black Hawk County =

Transit agency in Black Hawk County, Iowa

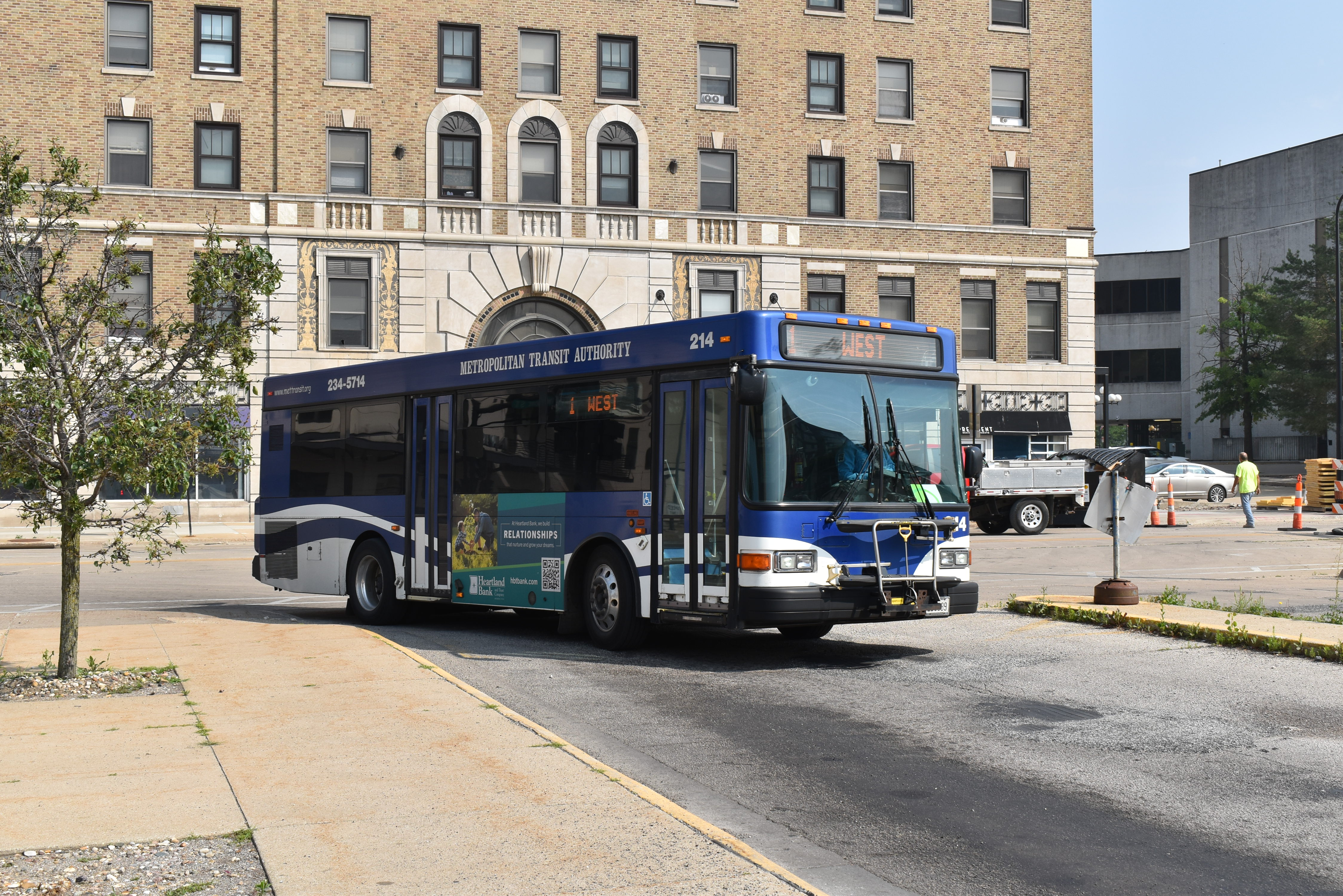
- A MET Transit bus in June 2023
- Founded: 1972
- Headquarters: 1515 Black Hawk Street
- Locale: Waterloo, Iowa
- Service area: Black Hawk County, Iowa
- Service type: bus service, paratransit
- Routes: 12
- Fleet: Gillig Low Floor
- Website: mettransit.org

The Metropolitan Transit Authority of Black Hawk County, marketed as MET Transit, is the primary provider of mass transportation in the cities of Waterloo and Cedar Falls, Iowa. The agency was founded in 1972, after the private National City Lines, which had operated public transit under contract from the city, pulled out of providing fixed routes, which led to the city directly taking over this service.

MET Transit is a flag down system, which means there are no dedicated bus stops, and a bus may be flagged down at any near side intersection along a route.

== Routes ==
- 1 Westside-Ansborough Ave
- 2 Westside-Baltimore St
- 3 Eastside-Donald St
- 4 Eastside-Lafayette St
- 5 Crossroads-West 11th St
- 5L Crossroads-Laporte Rd
- 6 Cedar Falls-University
- 7 Cedar Falls-Rainbow
- 8 West Loop
- 9 Cedar Falls Loop
- 10 Hawkeye Community College-UNI
- 11 UNI Panther Shuttle

== Facilities ==
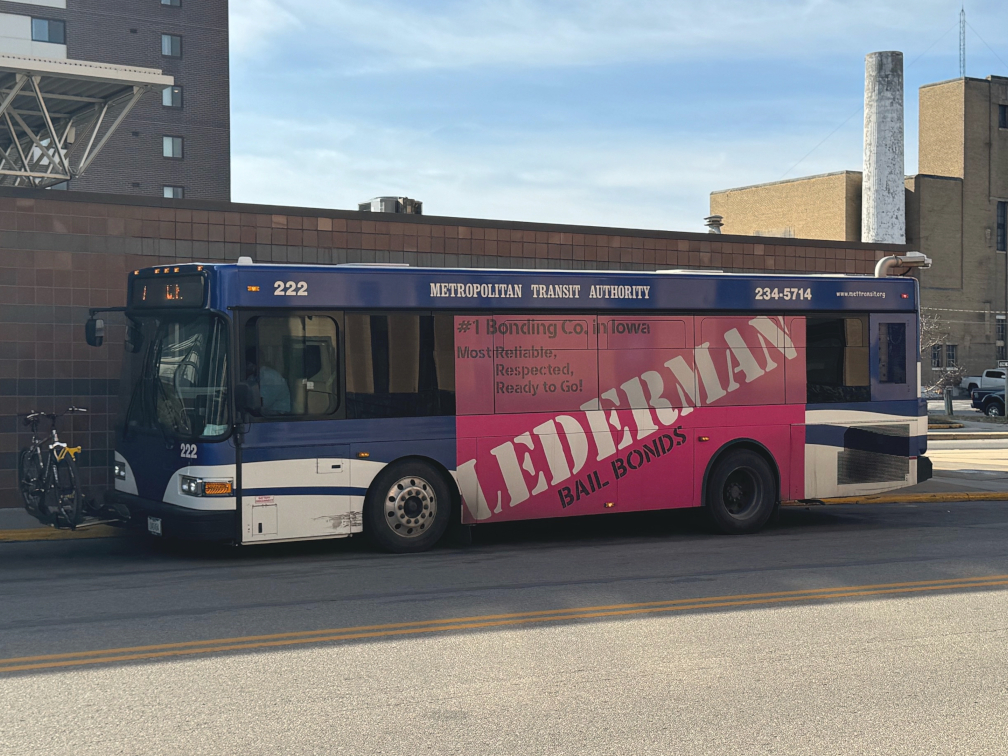
MET Transit 2022 Gillig Low Floor 29' #222 at Central Transfer.

- Central Transfer - This facility is located at 416 Sycamore Street in downtown Waterloo and opened February 26, 1989. The $327,000 structure provides an indoor waiting area, restrooms, vending machines, as well as an information desk. The facility serves as the primary transfer hub of MET Transit and also provides connections to intercity bus services operated by Burlington Trailways.
- UNI Multimodal Transportation Center - This facility, located at 1215 West 23rd St, on the UNI Campus in Cedar Falls, was constructed in 2010. The facility provides an indoor waiting area with restrooms and information. Bike lockers and over 490 vehicle parking spaces are also available. A solar array on the roof provides all the electricity needs of the $9.7 million building.

== Fixed Route Ridership ==
The ridership and service statistics shown here are of fixed route services only and do not include demand response. Per capita statistics are based on the Waterloo urbanized area as reported in NTD data. Starting in 2011, 2010 census numbers replace the 2000 census numbers to calculate per capita statistics.

	Ridership	Change	Ridership per capita
2005	345,203	n/a	3.19
2006	349,957	▲1.38%	3.23
2007	405,426	▲15.85%	3.74
2008	452,612	▲11.64%	4.18
2009	454,033	▲0.31%	4.19
2010	462,755	▲1.92%	4.27
2011	455,237	▼1.62%	4.01
2012	497,421	▲9.27%	4.39
2013	511,969	▲2.92%	4.51
2014	426,274	▼16.74%	3.76
2015	426,905	▲0.15%	3.76
2016	452,608	▲6.02%	3.99
2017	429,234	▼5.16%	3.78
2018	368,744	▼14.09%	3.25
2019	351,264	▼4.74%	3.1
2020	313,464	▼10.76%	2.76

== See also ==
- List of bus transit systems in the United States
