= Spring Creek Township, Black Hawk County, Iowa =

Township in Iowa, US

Spring Creek Township, Black Hawk County
- Township
- Coordinates: 42°20′53″N 092°06′48″W
- Country: United States
- State: Iowa
- County: Black Hawk

Area
  - Total: 28.2 sq mi (73.1 km^{2})
  - Land: 27.81 sq mi (72.03 km^{2})
  - Water: 0.41 sq mi (1.07 km^{2})
- Elevation: 890 ft (270 m)

Population (2000)
  - Total: 332
  - Density: 12/sq mi (4.6/km^{2})
- FIPS code: 19-93966
- GNIS feature ID: 0468736

Spring Creek Township is one of seventeen rural townships in Black Hawk County, Iowa, United States. As of the 2000 census, its population was 332.

== Geography ==
Spring Creek Township covers an area of 28.22 square miles (73.1 km^{2}) and contains no incorporated settlements. According to the USGS, it contains three cemeteries: Pleasant Hill, Spring Creek and Zion Lutheran.
