= Cedar Falls Township, Black Hawk County, Iowa =

Township in Iowa, US

Coordinates: 42.53°N 92.53°W

Cedar Falls Township, Black Hawk County
- Township
- Country: United States
- State: Iowa
- County: Black Hawk

Area
  - Total: 19.20 sq mi (49.73 km^{2})
  - Land: 19.20 sq mi (49.73 km^{2})
  - Water: 0 sq mi (0.0 km^{2})

Population (2000)
  - Total: 325
  - Density: 17/sq mi (6.5/km^{2})
- FIPS code: 19-90575
- GNIS feature ID: 0467566

Cedar Falls Township is one of seventeen rural townships in Black Hawk County, Iowa, United States. As of the 2000 census, its population was 325.

== Geography ==
Cedar Falls Township covers an area of 19.2 square miles (50 km^{2}) and contains no incorporated settlements.
