= Fox Township, Black Hawk County, Iowa =

Township in Iowa, US

Fox Township, Black Hawk County
- Township
- Coordinates: 42°25′49″N 092°06′46″W
- Country: United States
- State: Iowa
- County: Black Hawk

Area
  - Total: 34.46 sq mi (89.25 km^{2})
  - Land: 34.46 sq mi (89.25 km^{2})
  - Water: 0 sq mi (0 km^{2})
- Elevation: 942 ft (287 m)

Population (2000)
  - Total: 520
  - Density: 15/sq mi (5.8/km^{2})
- FIPS code: 19-91374
- GNIS feature ID: 0467845

Fox Township is one of seventeen rural townships in Black Hawk County, Iowa, United States. As of the 2000 census, its population was 520.

== Geography ==
Fox Township covers an area of 34.46 square miles (89.3 km^{2}) and contains no incorporated settlements.
