= Eagle Township, Black Hawk County, Iowa =

Township in Iowa, US

Eagle Township, Black Hawk County
- Township
- Coordinates: 42°20′28″N 092°21′10″W
- Country: United States
- State: Iowa
- County: Black Hawk

Area
  - Total: 36.61 sq mi (94.83 km^{2})
  - Land: 36.61 sq mi (94.81 km^{2})
  - Water: 0.0077 sq mi (0.02 km^{2})
- Elevation: 942 ft (287 m)

Population (2000)
  - Total: 511
  - Density: 14/sq mi (5.4/km^{2})
- FIPS code: 19-91092
- GNIS feature ID: 0467747

Eagle Township is one of seventeen rural townships in Black Hawk County, Iowa, United States. As of the 2000 census, its population was 511.

== History ==
Eagle Township was organized in 1858.

== Geography ==
Eagle Township covers an area of 36.62 square miles (94.8 km^{2}) and contains no incorporated settlements. According to the USGS, it contains two cemeteries: Eagle and Saint Mary's of Mount Carmel.
