= Barclay Township, Iowa =

Township in Iowa, US

Barclay Township, Black Hawk County
- Township
- Coordinates: 42°31′02″N 092°07′54″W
- Country: United States
- State: Iowa
- County: Black Hawk

Area
  - Total: 36.02 sq mi (93.29 km^{2})
  - Land: 36.02 sq mi (93.29 km^{2})
  - Water: 0 sq mi (0 km^{2})
- Elevation: 991 ft (302 m)

Population (2000)
  - Total: 542
  - Density: 15/sq mi (5.8/km^{2})
- FIPS code: 19-90126
- GNIS feature ID: 0467414

Barclay Township is one of seventeen rural townships in Black Hawk County, Iowa, United States. As of the 2000 census, its population was 542.

== Geography ==
Barclay Township covers an area of 36.02 square miles (93.3 km^{2}) and contains no incorporated settlements. According to the USGS, it contains three cemeteries: New Barclay, Old Barclay and Saint Francis.
