= Evansdale, Iowa =

Evansdale
- City
- Nickname: Edale
- Location of Evansdale, Iowa
- Coordinates: 42°27′30″N 92°15′39″W
- Country: US
- State: Iowa
- County: Black Hawk
- Incorporated: November 13, 1947

Area
  - Total: 4.06 sq mi (10.52 km^{2})
  - Land: 4.00 sq mi (10.35 km^{2})
  - Water: 0.066 sq mi (0.17 km^{2})
- Elevation: 840 ft (260 m)

Population (2020)
  - Total: 4,561
  - Density: 1,141.3/sq mi (440.65/km^{2})
- Time zone: UTC-6 (Central (CST))
  - Summer (DST): UTC-5 (CDT)
- ZIP code: 50707
- Area code: 319
- FIPS code: 19-25995
- GNIS feature ID: 1936018
- Website: evansdale.govoffice.com

Evansdale is a city in Black Hawk County, Iowa, United States. The population was 4,561 in the 2020 census, an increase from 4,526 in 2000. It is part of the Waterloo–Cedar Falls Metropolitan Statistical Area.

== Geography ==
According to the United States Census Bureau, the city has a total area of 4.12 square miles (10.67 km^{2}), of which 4.05 square miles (10.49 km^{2}) is land and 0.07 square miles (0.18 km^{2}) is water.

Evansdale is a border-to-border suburb of Waterloo.

== History ==
Evansdale began in 1947, when residents of the Home Acres and River Forest Area adjoining Waterloo's east city limits faced a common drainage problem and formed the Home Acres Improvement Association. In August of that year, the Association petitioned for incorporation as a town and presented its documents to District Judge William T. Evans through Parkersburg attorney Dale Van Eman, hence Evansdale. The poll resulted in a 205-106 vote for incorporation. The area's growth can be traced back to the turn of the century. Situated in East Waterloo Township, Evansdale evolved from several developed sections. Around the turn of the century, William T. Evans owned a farm just south of Watermelon Avenue in what is approximately the present route of Highway 20. Lafayette Road, an extension of Lafayette Street from Waterloo, cut through the Evans' farm. Just east of Evans' farm was a farm owned by Julia B. Richards. The County School #1 sat on the corner of Richards' property in what eventually became known as Evans Crossing. This was the first of the sections which later became Evansdale.

Other large farmers in the area at the time were: Mary C. Crumrine, Jacob Griffith, Samuel R. White, C.C. Wolf, Hugh Newell, Lore Alford, James Gardner, George Shirley, J.H. Johnston, August Westendorf, Frederick Timmermann and Carl Bunger. Another section of land ca land owned by C.C. Wolf. The land was located between what is now Grand Blvd. and the present site of Evans Road. In the early 1900s, Wolf built the Elk Run Hotel as a summer resort. The hotel had a large ballroom and dining room and was well known by the residents of northeast Iowa. Commuter trains of the Illinois Central railroad brought weekend visitors to the resort, which faced the Cedar River.At that time, Wolf, who was originally from Parkersburg, began to plat lots in the area. However, his hotel business failed, and in 1928 William Fox formed the Home Acres Land Association and developed the land formerly owned by Wolf and some additional land in Evansdale. Mr. Fox operated an insurance agency in Evansdale for many years. The Home Acres Land Association was originally headquartered in the Elk Run Hotel. A third section, developed before Fox's land development, was Casebeer Heights. Lore Alford, a prominent Waterloo lawyer owned the land at the turn of the century. He sold the property to Jack Casebeer, a Waterloo restaurant owner. Casebeer developed the land as a summer resort. Other sections of Evansdale were developed just prior to 1941 but it was the building boom following the War that created the problems that precipitated the incorporation of the city. Shortly thereafter, on November 1, 1947, 110 voters turned out to elect the only ticket on the ballot at the time, with William Wiltfang as mayor. The first council meeting was conducted November 24, 1947, in an abandoned chicken house owned by Councilman Boelman. Since that time, Evansdale's growth has been steady but complicated. With the growth of the city the installation of sewers and water lines were necessary to keep pace with the needs of the community. Progress was complicated by the introduction of the Urban Renewal program in 1969. However, the program provided a fresh start for the city, with new housing and renovations that gave Evansdale a new look.

== Government ==
Evansdale is administered by a five-member city council and a mayor. One council member is elected from each of Evansdale's four wards, and one is elected at-large. As of 2007, the mayor was Doug Faas. Who has served as a former Evansdale City Council member, and also previously served as a board member on the Waterloo Community School Board. His predecessor was Chad Deutsch. Deutsch was elected in 2007 after unsuccessful attempts in 2001 and 2005 to unseat former Mayor John Mardis, and served three terms as Mayor.The current mayor is DeAnne Kobliska.

In 2007, the city had a budget of $3.8 million and a tax rate of $6.75 per $1000 of taxable property valuation. The city built a new community response center to house police and fire rescue, which were outgrowing their respective areas.

== Demographics ==
Historical population
Census	Pop.	Note	%±
1950	3,571		—
1960	5,738		60.7%
1970	5,038		−12.2%
1980	4,798		−4.8%
1990	4,638		−3.3%
2000	4,526		−2.4%
2010	4,751		5.0%
2020	4,561		−4.0%
U.S. Decennial Census

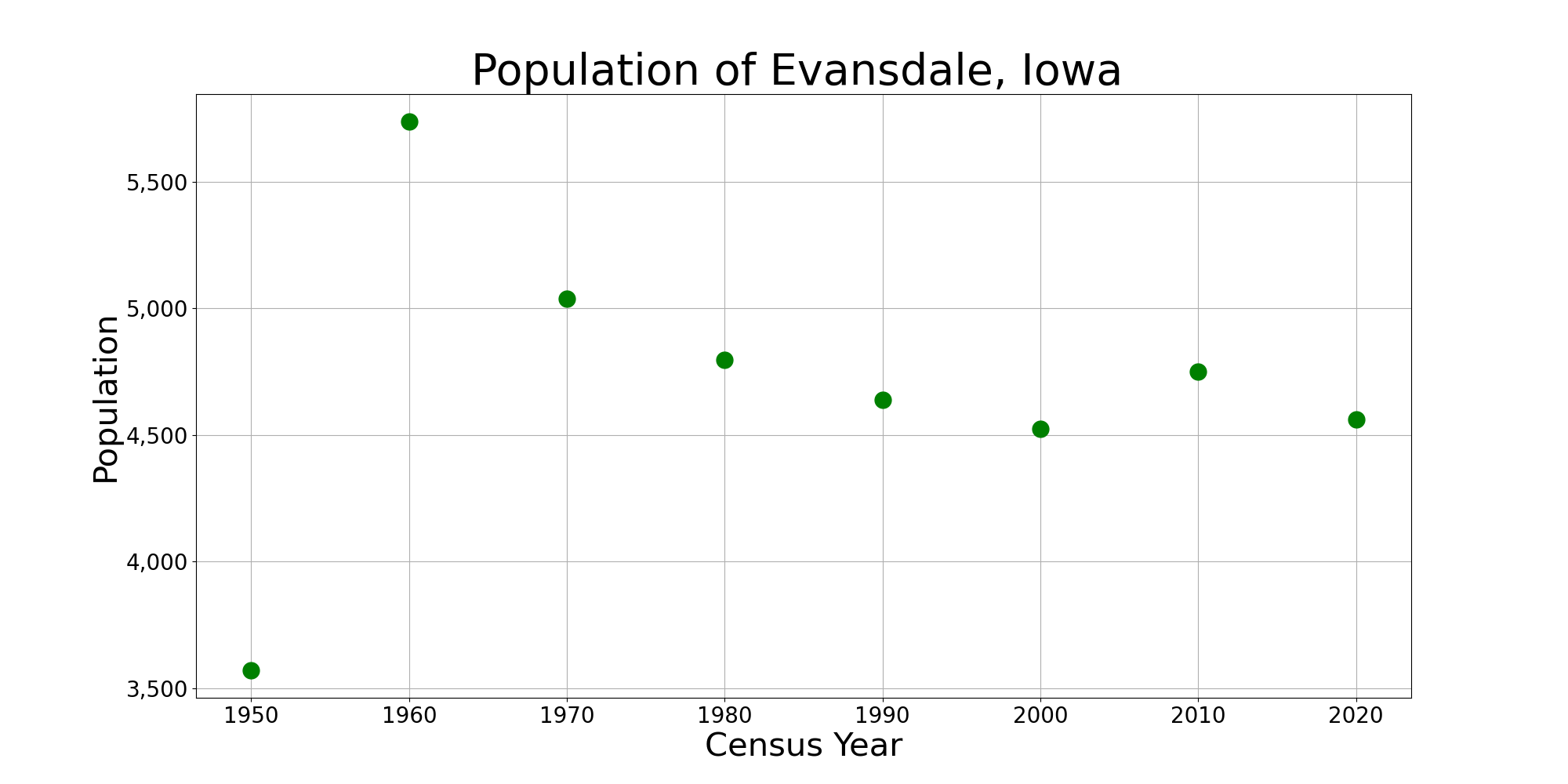
The population of Evansdale, Iowa, from the US census data

=== 2020 census ===
As of the 2020 census, there were 4,561 people, 2,037 households, and 1,225 families residing in the city. The population density was 1,141.3 inhabitants per square mile (440.6/km^{2}). There were 2,142 housing units at an average density of 536.0 per square mile (206.9/km^{2}). Of the housing units, 4.9% were vacant; the homeowner vacancy rate was 1.8%, and the rental vacancy rate was 5.3%. 99.1% of residents lived in urban areas, while 0.9% lived in rural areas.

Racial composition as of the 2020 census
Race	Number	Percent
White	4,063	89.1%
Black or African American	129	2.8%
American Indian and Alaska Native	15	0.3%
Asian	29	0.6%
Native Hawaiian and Other Pacific Islander	26	0.6%
Some other race	42	0.9%
Two or more races	257	5.6%
Hispanic or Latino (of any race)	131	2.9%

Of the 2,037 households, 26.0% had children under the age of 18 living with them, 41.7% were married-couple households, 9.0% were cohabitating couples, 27.7% had a female householder with no spouse or partner present, and 21.6% had a male householder with no spouse or partner present. In total, 39.9% of households were non-families, 32.3% were made up of individuals, and 15.1% had someone living alone who was 65 years old or older.

The median age in the city was 42.5 years. 22.0% of residents were under the age of 18 and 20.4% were 65 years of age or older. 24.1% of residents were under the age of 20; 5.5% were between the ages of 20 and 24; 23.6% were from 25 to 44; and 26.4% were from 45 to 64. The gender makeup of the city was 49.2% male and 50.8% female. For every 100 females there were 97.0 males, and for every 100 females age 18 and over there were 96.4 males age 18 and over.

=== 2010 census ===
As of the census of 2010, there were 4,751 people, 1,987 households, and 1,316 families residing in the city. The population density was 1,173.1 inhabitants per square mile (452.9/km^{2}). There were 2,048 housing units at an average density of 505.7 per square mile (195.3/km^{2}). The racial makeup of the city was 94.8% White, 1.7% African American, 0.2% Native American, 0.5% Asian, 0.4% from other races, and 2.4% from two or more races. Hispanic or Latino of any race were 1.7% of the population.

There were 1,987 households, of which 31.2% had children under the age of 18 living with them, 48.1% were married couples living together, 12.6% had a female householder with no husband present, 5.5% had a male householder with no wife present, and 33.8% were non-families. 26.9% of all households were made up of individuals, and 10.5% had someone living alone who was 65 years of age or older. The average household size was 2.39 and the average family size was 2.87.

The median age in the city was 38 years. 23.3% of residents were under the age of 18; 8.5% were between the ages of 18 and 24; 26.2% were from 25 to 44; 27.9% were from 45 to 64; and 13.9% were 65 years of age or older. The gender makeup of the city was 48.9% male and 51.1% female.

=== 2000 census ===
As of the census of 2000, there were 4,526 people, 1,822 households, and 1,260 families residing in the city. The population density was 1,075.0 inhabitants per square mile (415.1/km^{2}). There were 1,871 housing units at an average density of 444.4 per square mile (171.6/km^{2}). The racial makeup of the city was 96.44% White, 0.77% African American, 0.18% Native American, 0.55% Asian, 0.07% Pacific Islander, 0.33% from other races, and 1.66% from two or more races. Hispanic or Latino of any race were 0.93% of the population.

There were 1,822 households, out of which 32.6% had children under the age of 18 living with them, 52.1% were married couples living together, 12.9% had a female householder with no husband present, and 30.8% were non-families. 26.0% of all households were made up of individuals, and 12.0% had someone living alone who was 65 years of age or older. The average household size was 2.48 and the average family size was 2.95.

Age spread: 25.5% under the age of 18, 10.2% from 18 to 24, 26.7% from 25 to 44, 24.4% from 45 to 64, and 13.2% who were 65 years of age or older. The median age was 36 years. For every 100 females, there were 97.4 males. For every 100 females age 18 and over, there were 91.0 males.

The median income for a household in the city was $31,160, and the median income for a family was $37,418. Males had a median income of $29,847 versus $20,434 for females. The per capita income for the city was $15,363. About 10.2% of families and 12.0% of the population were below the poverty line, including 19.5% of those under age 18 and 11.3% of those age 65 or over.

== Parks and recreation ==
Located in Evansdale is a trailhead for the Cedar Valley Nature Trail.

== Education ==
Evansdale children attend the Waterloo Community School District.

Schools in Evansdale:

- Bunger Middle School
- Poyner Elementary School - Located on the site of the former St. Nicholas Catholic Church.

== See also ==
- Interstate 380
- U.S. Route 20
