= Orange Township, Black Hawk County, Iowa =

Township in Iowa, US

Orange Township, Black Hawk County
- Township
- Coordinates: 42°24′24″N 092°21′09″W
- Country: United States
- State: Iowa
- County: Black Hawk

Area
  - Total: 18.22 sq mi (47.19 km^{2})
  - Land: 18.22 sq mi (47.19 km^{2})
  - Water: 0 sq mi (0 km^{2})
- Elevation: 928 ft (283 m)

Population (2000)
  - Total: 385
  - Density: 21/sq mi (8.2/km^{2})
- FIPS code: 19-93186
- GNIS feature ID: 0468468

Orange Township is one of seventeen rural townships in Black Hawk County, Iowa, United States. As of the 2000 census, its population was 385.

== Geography ==
Orange Township covers an area of 18.22 square miles (47.2 km^{2}) and contains no incorporated settlements.
