= Gilbertville, Iowa =

- City
- Location of Gilbertville, Iowa
- Coordinates: 42°25′06″N 92°12′51″W
- Country: US
- State: Iowa
- County: Black Hawk

Area
  - Total: 0.36 sq mi (0.93 km^{2})
  - Land: 0.36 sq mi (0.93 km^{2})
  - Water: 0 sq mi (0.00 km^{2})
- Elevation: 860 ft (260 m)

Population (2020)
  - Total: 794
  - Density: 2,220.8/sq mi (857.44/km^{2})
- Time zone: UTC-6 (Central (CST))
  - Summer (DST): UTC-5 (CDT)
- ZIP code: 50634
- Area code: 319
- FIPS code: 19-30675
- GNIS feature ID: 2394895
- Website: www.gilbertvilleia.com

Gilbertville is a city in Black Hawk County, Iowa, United States. The population was 794 at the time of the 2020 census. It is part of the Waterloo-Cedar Falls metropolitan area.

== History ==
Gilbertville was platted in 1856.

== Geography ==
According to the United States Census Bureau, the city has a total area of 0.40 square miles (1.04 km^{2}), all land.

Tornado activity

Gilbertville-area historical tornado activity is above Iowa state average. It is 206% greater than the overall U.S. average.

On May 15, 1968, an F5 (max. wind speeds 261-318 mph) tornado 22.7 miles away from the Gilbertville city center killed 5 people and injured 156 people and caused between $5,000,000 and $50,000,000 in damages.

On August 26, 1965, an F4 (max. wind speeds 207-260 mph) tornado 8.1 miles away from the city center killed one person and injured 17 people and caused between $500,000 and $5,000,000 in damages.

== Education ==
Gilbertville is within the Waterloo Community School District.

Private high school

- Don Bosco High School

Private elementary/middle school

- Immaculate Conception-St. Joseph School

== Demographics ==
Historical populations
Year	Pop.	±%
1880	155	—
1890	162	+4.5%
1900	189	+16.7%
1910	200	+5.8%
1920	212	+6.0%
1930	241	+13.7%
1940	259	+7.5%
1950	399	+54.1%
1960	533	+33.6%
1970	655	+22.9%
1980	740	+13.0%
1990	748	+1.1%
2000	767	+2.5%
2010	712	−7.2%
2020	794	+11.5%
Source:"U.S. Census website". United States Census Bureau. and Iowa Data Center; Source: U.S. Decennial Census

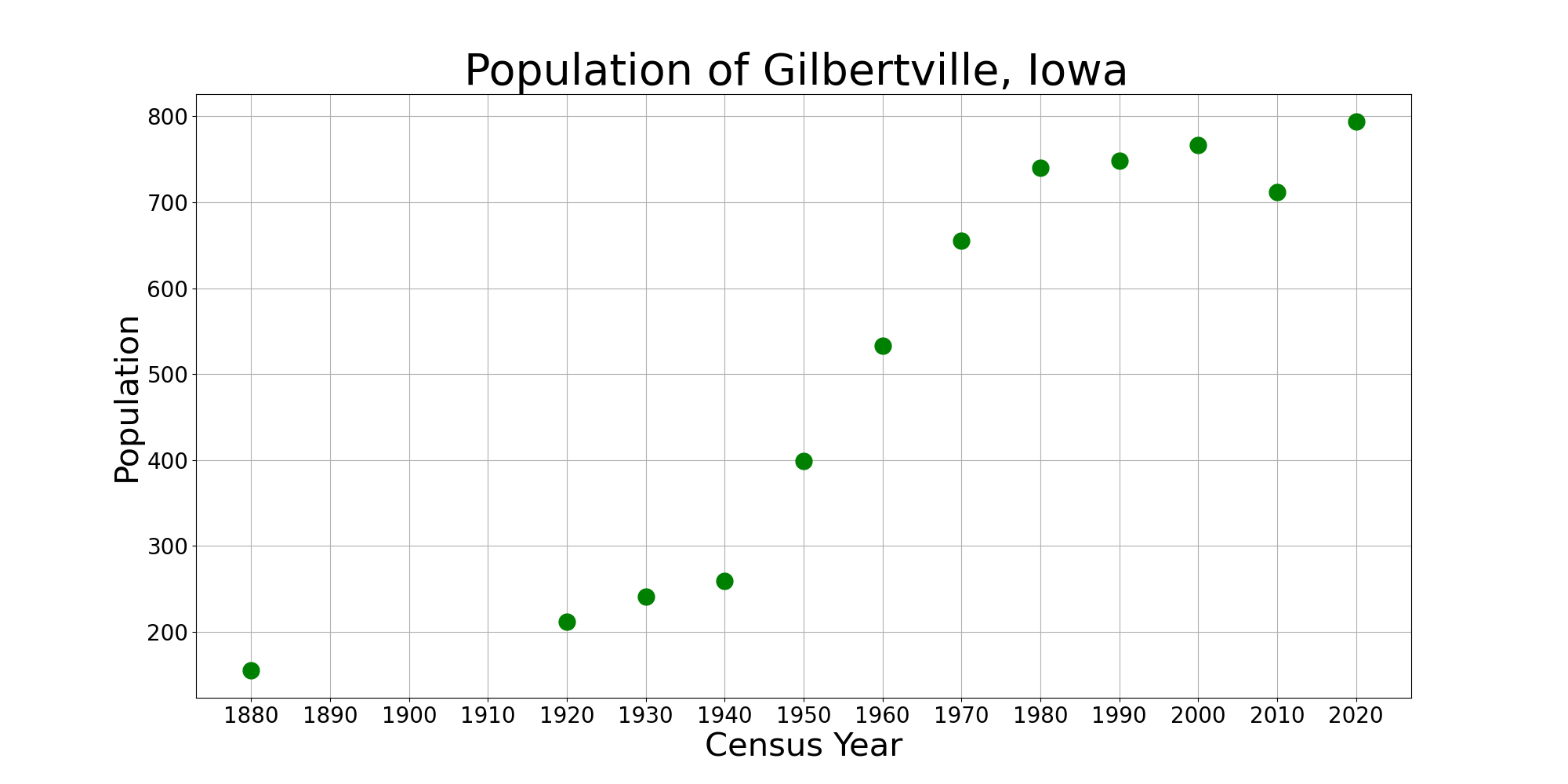
The population of Gilbertville, Iowa from US census data

=== 2020 census ===
As of the census of 2020, there were 794 people, 338 households, and 225 families residing in the city. The population density was 2,220.8 inhabitants per square mile (857.4/km^{2}). There were 353 housing units at an average density of 987.3 per square mile (381.2/km^{2}). The racial makeup of the city was 95.2% White, 1.1% Black or African American, 0.3% Native American, 0.3% Asian, 0.0% Pacific Islander, 0.5% from other races and 2.6% from two or more races. Hispanic or Latino persons of any race comprised 1.8% of the population.

Of the 338 households, 27.8% of which had children under the age of 18 living with them, 54.7% were married couples living together, 6.5% were cohabitating couples, 23.1% had a female householder with no spouse or partner present and 15.7% had a male householder with no spouse or partner present. 33.4% of all households were non-families. 27.8% of all households were made up of individuals, 13.9% had someone living alone who was 65 years old or older.

The median age in the city was 44.6 years. 21.9% of the residents were under the age of 20; 4.5% were between the ages of 20 and 24; 24.2% were from 25 and 44; 26.8% were from 45 and 64; and 22.5% were 65 years of age or older. The gender makeup of the city was 48.9% male and 51.1% female.

=== 2010 census ===
As of the census of 2010, there were 712 people, 303 households, and 199 families living in the city. The population density was 1,780.0 inhabitants per square mile (687.3/km^{2}). There were 313 housing units at an average density of 782.5 per square mile (302.1/km^{2}). The racial makeup of the city was 98.6% White, 0.1% Native American, 0.6% Asian, 0.1% from other races, and 0.6% from two or more races. Hispanic or Latino of any race were 1.7% of the population.

There were 303 households, of which 28.4% had children under the age of 18 living with them, 52.8% were married couples living together, 8.6% had a female householder with no husband present, 4.3% had a male householder with no wife present, and 34.3% were non-families. 28.7% of all households were made up of individuals, and 18.2% had someone living alone who was 65 years of age or older. The average household size was 2.35 and the average family size was 2.87.

The median age in the city was 42.7 years. 21.6% of residents were under the age of 18; 9.1% were between the ages of 18 and 24; 23% were from 25 to 44; 26.6% were from 45 to 64; and 19.8% were 65 years of age or older. The gender makeup of the city was 49.4% male and 50.6% female.

=== 2000 census ===
As of the census of 2000, there were 767 people, 297 households, and 212 families living in the city. The population density was 1,957.8 inhabitants per square mile (755.9/km^{2}). There were 305 housing units at an average density of 778.5 per square mile (300.6/km^{2}). The racial makeup of the city was 99.48% White, 0.13% African American, and 0.39% from two or more races. Hispanic or Latino of any race were 0.78% of the population.

There were 297 households, out of which 35.0% had children under the age of 18 living with them, 61.3% were married couples living together, 7.7% had a female householder with no husband present, and 28.6% were non-families. 25.9% of all households were made up of individuals, and 16.2% had someone living alone who was 65 years of age or older. The average household size was 2.58 and the average family size was 3.14.

In the city, the population was spread out, with 27.1% under the age of 18, 8.3% from 18 to 24, 28.4% from 25 to 44, 19.6% from 45 to 64, and 16.6% who were 65 years of age or older. The median age was 38 years. For every 100 females, there were 97.2 males. For every 100 females age 18 and over, there were 98.2 males.

The median income for a household in the city was $41,490, and the median income for a family was $47,917. Males had a median income of $31,458 versus $24,286 for females. The per capita income for the city was $18,367. About 4.0% of families and 4.0% of the population were below the poverty line, including 5.9% of those under age 18 and 7.6% of those age 65 or over.
