= Raymond, Iowa =

- City
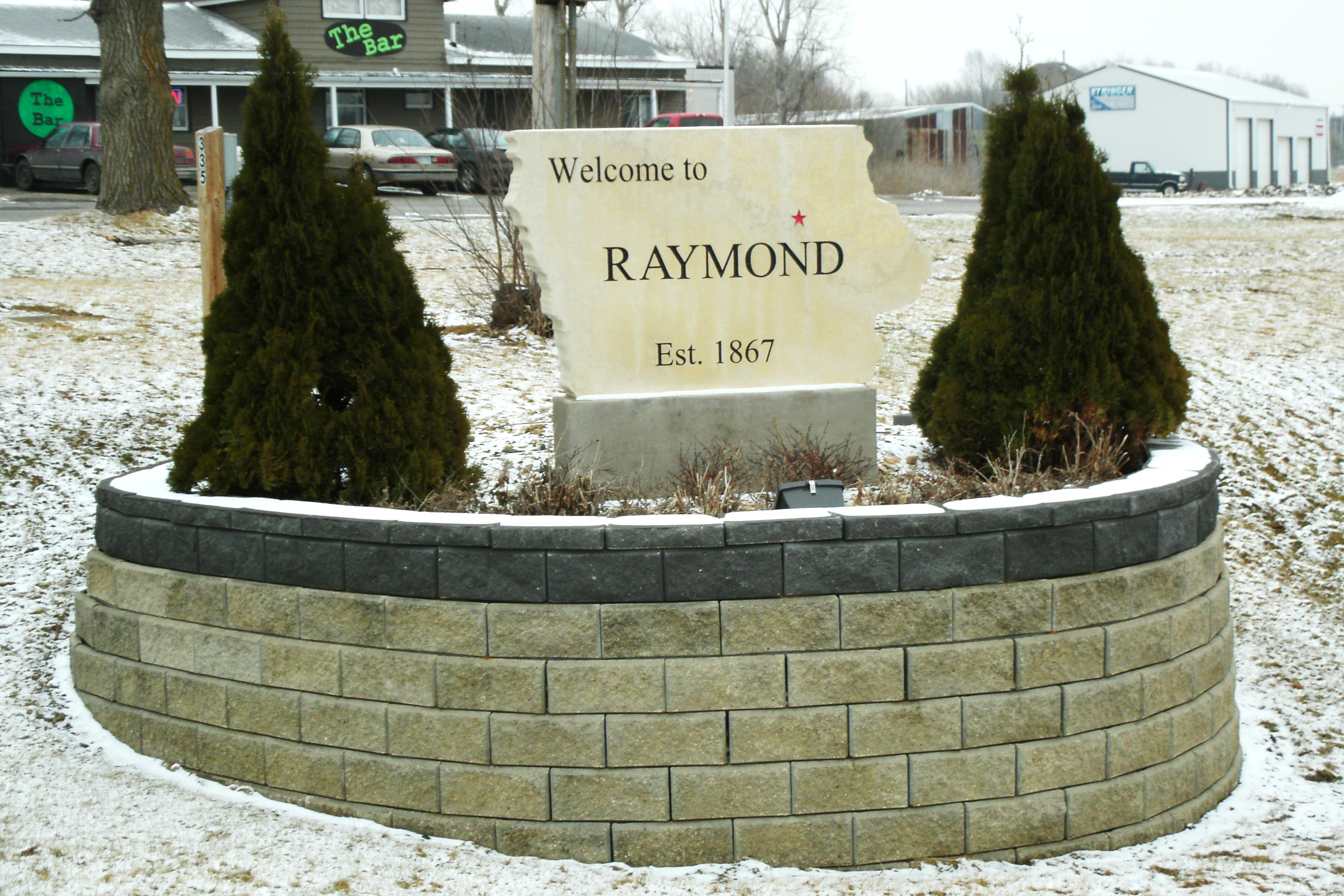
- Iowa Shaped Welcome Sign in Raymond

- Location of Raymond, Iowa
- Coordinates: 42°28′16″N 92°14′26″W
- Country: US
- State: Iowa
- County: Black Hawk

Area
  - Total: 1.63 sq mi (4.23 km^{2})
  - Land: 1.63 sq mi (4.23 km^{2})
  - Water: 0 sq mi (0.00 km^{2})
- Elevation: 909 ft (277 m)

Population (2020)
  - Total: 759
  - Density: 464.2/sq mi (179.23/km^{2})
- Time zone: UTC-6 (Central (CST))
  - Summer (DST): UTC-5 (CDT)
- ZIP code: 50667
- Area code: 319
- FIPS code: 19-65820
- GNIS feature ID: 2396326
- Website: www.raymondia.us

Raymond is a city in Black Hawk County, Iowa, United States. The population was 759 at the time of the 2020 census. It is part of the Waterloo–Cedar Falls Metropolitan Statistical Area.

== History ==
Raymond was platted in 1867. It was a shipping point on the Illinois Central Railroad.

== Geography ==
According to the United States Census Bureau, the city has a total area of 1.63 square miles (4.22 km^{2}), all land.

== Demographics ==
Historical populations
Year	Pop.	±%
1880	122	—
1890	115	−5.7%
1900	122	+6.1%
1910	128	+4.9%
1920	144	+12.5%
1930	177	+22.9%
1940	199	+12.4%
1950	201	+1.0%
1960	378	+88.1%
1970	582	+54.0%
1980	655	+12.5%
1990	619	−5.5%
2000	537	−13.2%
2010	788	+46.7%
2020	759	−3.7%
Source:"U.S. Census website". United States Census Bureau. and Iowa Data Center; Source: U.S. Decennial Census

=== 2020 census ===
As of the census of 2020, there were 759 people, 309 households, and 225 families residing in the city. The population density was 464.2 inhabitants per square mile (179.2/km^{2}). There were 324 housing units at an average density of 198.2 per square mile (76.5/km^{2}). The racial makeup of the city was 94.5% White, 1.4% Black or African American, 0.0% Native American, 0.1% Asian, 0.0% Pacific Islander, 0.3% from other races and 3.7% from two or more races. Hispanic or Latino persons of any race comprised 2.4% of the population.

Of the 309 households, 29.4% of which had children under the age of 18 living with them, 61.2% were married couples living together, 7.4% were cohabitating couples, 18.4% had a female householder with no spouse or partner present and 12.9% had a male householder with no spouse or partner present. 27.2% of all households were non-families. 21.7% of all households were made up of individuals, 9.4% had someone living alone who was 65 years old or older.

The median age in the city was 45.0 years. 23.6% of the residents were under the age of 20; 3.3% were between the ages of 20 and 24; 23.1% were from 25 and 44; 29.9% were from 45 and 64; and 20.2% were 65 years of age or older. The gender makeup of the city was 48.6% male and 51.4% female.

=== 2010 census ===
As of the census of 2010, there were 788 people, 313 households, and 238 families living in the city. The population density was 483.4 inhabitants per square mile (186.6/km^{2}). There were 320 housing units at an average density of 196.3 per square mile (75.8/km^{2}). The racial makeup of the city was 97.1% White, 0.9% African American, 0.5% Asian, 0.1% Pacific Islander, 0.5% from other races, and 0.9% from two or more races. Hispanic or Latino of any race were 1.0% of the population.

There were 313 households, of which 32.9% had children under the age of 18 living with them, 67.4% were married couples living together, 5.1% had a female householder with no husband present, 3.5% had a male householder with no wife present, and 24.0% were non-families. 20.8% of all households were made up of individuals, and 7.4% had someone living alone who was 65 years of age or older. The average household size was 2.52 and the average family size was 2.91.

The median age in the city was 40.4 years. 23.1% of residents were under the age of 18; 6.3% were between the ages of 18 and 24; 27.9% were from 25 to 44; 29.4% were from 45 to 64; and 13.3% were 65 years of age or older. The gender makeup of the city was 49.1% male and 50.9% female.

=== 2000 census ===
As of the census of 2000, there were 537 people, 204 households, and 161 families living in the city. The population density was 348.5 inhabitants per square mile (134.6/km^{2}). There were 206 housing units at an average density of 133.7 per square mile (51.6/km^{2}). The racial makeup of the city was 98.51% White, 0.56% from other races, and 0.93% from two or more races. Hispanic or Latino of any race were 1.68% of the population.

There were 204 households, out of which 33.8% had children under the age of 18 living with them, 69.1% were married couples living together, 7.4% had a female householder with no husband present, and 20.6% were non-families. 18.1% of all households were made up of individuals, and 6.9% had someone living alone who was 65 years of age or older. The average household size was 2.63 and the average family size was 2.98.

26.4% are under the age of 18, 5.4% from 18 to 24, 28.5% from 25 to 44, 26.6% from 45 to 64, and 13.0% who were 65 years of age or older. The median age was 38 years. For every 100 females, there were 96.0 males. For every 100 females age 18 and over, there were 93.6 males.

The median income for a household in the city was $47,813, and the median income for a family was $55,417. Males had a median income of $39,306 versus $25,192 for females. The per capita income for the city was $22,201. About 3.3% of families and 3.6% of the population were below the poverty line, including 8.1% of those under age 18 and none of those age 65 or over.

== Education ==
Raymond is within the Waterloo Community School District.

== See also ==
William Waterfield House is on the National Register of Historic Places listings in Black Hawk County, Iowa.
