= Elk Run Heights, Iowa =

- City
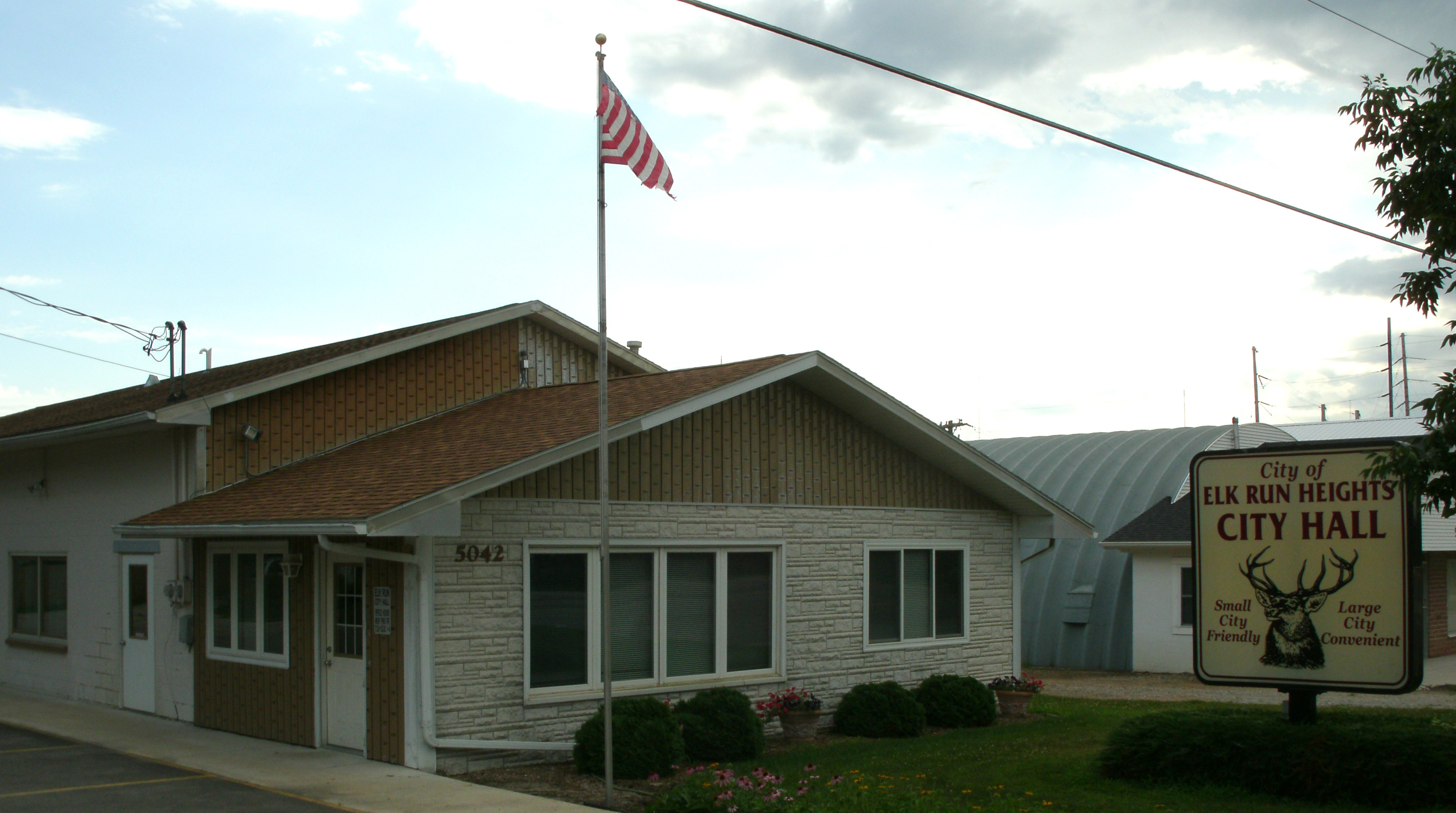
- Elk Run Heights City Hall

- Location of Elk Run Heights, Iowa
- Coordinates: 42°27′52″N 92°14′40″W
- Country: US
- State: Iowa
- County: Black Hawk

Area
  - Total: 1.09 sq mi (2.82 km^{2})
  - Land: 1.08 sq mi (2.81 km^{2})
  - Water: 0.0039 sq mi (0.01 km^{2})
- Elevation: 863 ft (263 m)

Population (2020)
  - Total: 1,069
  - Density: 986.0/sq mi (380.71/km^{2})
- Time zone: UTC-6 (Central (CST))
  - Summer (DST): UTC-5 (CDT)
- ZIP code: 50707
- Area code: 319
- FIPS code: 19-24870
- GNIS feature ID: 2394651
- Website: elkrunheights.com

Elk Run Heights is a city in Black Hawk County, Iowa, United States. The population was 1,069 at the 2020 census. It is part of the Waterloo–Cedar Falls Metropolitan Statistical Area.

== History ==
Elk Run Heights was established in 1951.

== Geography ==
According to the United States Census Bureau, the city has a total area of 1.06 square miles (2.75 km^{2}), all land.

Elk Run Heights is a suburb of Waterloo.

== Demographics ==
Historical populations
Year	Pop.	±%
1960	1,124	—
1970	1,175	+4.5%
1980	1,186	+0.9%
1990	1,088	−8.3%
2000	1,052	−3.3%
2010	1,117	+6.2%
2020	1,069	−4.3%
Source:"U.S. Census website". United States Census Bureau. and Iowa Data Center; Source: US Decennial Census

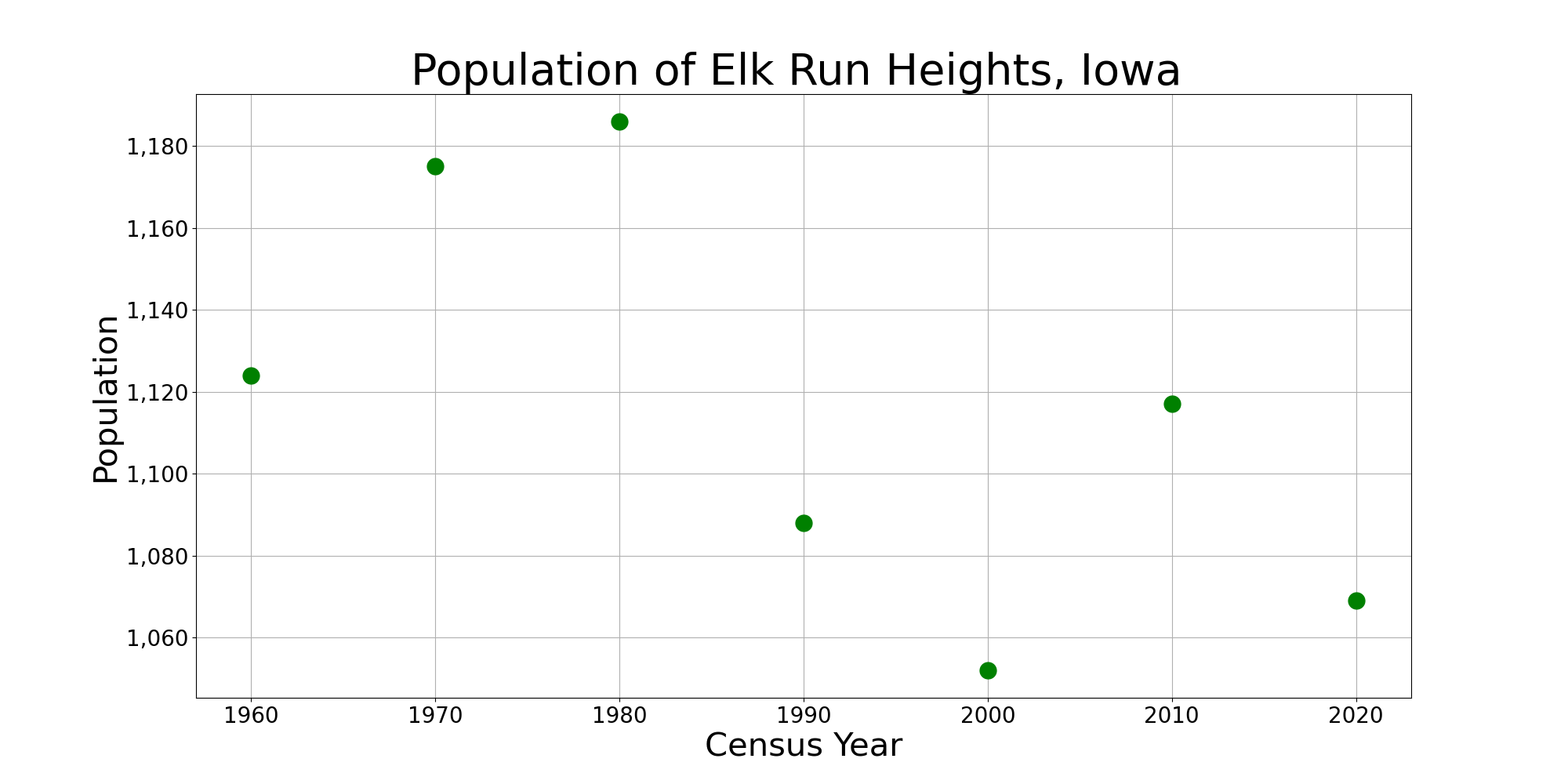
The population of Elk Run Heights, Iowa from US census data

=== 2020 census ===
As of the 2020 census, there were 1,069 people, 447 households, and 338 families residing in the city. The median age was 45.8 years, and 17.5% of residents were under the age of 18. For every 100 females there were 99.8 males, and for every 100 females age 18 and over there were 96.9 males age 18 and over. The gender makeup of the city was 50.0% male and 50.0% female.

The population density was 986.0 inhabitants per square mile (380.7/km^{2}). There were 463 housing units at an average density of 427.1 per square mile (164.9/km^{2}). 96.8% of residents lived in urban areas, while 3.2% lived in rural areas.

Of households in the city, 26.2% had children under the age of 18 living in them. Of all households, 60.4% were married-couple households, 9.6% were cohabitating couples, 13.4% were households with a male householder and no spouse or partner present, and 16.6% were households with a female householder and no spouse or partner present. About 24.4% of households were non-families, 18.6% were made up of individuals, and 7.9% had someone living alone who was 65 years of age or older.

Of all housing units, 3.5% were vacant. The homeowner vacancy rate was 1.0% and the rental vacancy rate was 9.4%.

The age distribution was 19.5% under the age of 20, 3.8% from 20 to 24, 26.2% from 25 to 44, 29.6% from 45 to 64, and 21.0% who were 65 years of age or older.

Racial composition as of the 2020 census
Race	Number	Percent
White	987	92.3%
Black or African American	8	0.7%
American Indian and Alaska Native	9	0.8%
Asian	1	0.1%
Native Hawaiian and Other Pacific Islander	4	0.4%
Some other race	5	0.5%
Two or more races	55	5.1%
Hispanic or Latino (of any race)	45	4.2%

=== 2010 census ===
As of the census of 2010, there were 1,117 people, 461 households, and 337 families living in the city. The population density was 1,053.8 inhabitants per square mile (406.9/km^{2}). There were 465 housing units at an average density of 438.7 per square mile (169.4/km^{2}). The racial makeup of the city was 94.6% White, 1.7% African American, 0.3% Native American, 0.1% Asian, 0.1% Pacific Islander, 0.5% from other races, and 2.7% from two or more races. Hispanic or Latino of any race were 2.5% of the population.

There were 461 households, of which 27.1% had children under the age of 18 living with them, 58.6% were married couples living together, 9.8% had a female householder with no husband present, 4.8% had a male householder with no wife present, and 26.9% were non-families. 21.9% of all households were made up of individuals, and 8.3% had someone living alone who was 65 years of age or older. The average household size was 2.42 and the average family size was 2.79.

The median age in the city was 44.1 years. 19.3% of residents were under the age of 18; 8.9% were between the ages of 18 and 24; 23% were from 25 to 44; 33.2% were from 45 to 64; and 15.6% were 65 years of age or older. The gender makeup of the city was 49.9% male and 50.1% female.

=== 2000 census ===
As of the census of 2000, there were 1,052 people, 394 households, and 325 families living in the city. The population density was 1,060.1 inhabitants per square mile (409.3/km^{2}). There were 397 housing units at an average density of 400.1 per square mile (154.5/km^{2}). The racial makeup of the city was 97.53% White, 0.67% African American, 0.10% Native American, 0.10% Asian, 0.29% from other races, and 1.33% from two or more races. Hispanic or Latino of any race were 2.00% of the population.

There were 394 households, out of which 37.8% had children under the age of 18 living with them, 69.5% were married couples living together, 8.1% had a female householder with no husband present, and 17.3% were non-families. 13.2% of all households were made up of individuals, and 6.1% had someone living alone who was 65 years of age or older. The average household size was 2.67 and the average family size was 2.92.

Age spread: 25.8% under the age of 18, 7.0% from 18 to 24, 28.7% from 25 to 44, 24.0% from 45 to 64, and 14.4% who were 65 years of age or older. The median age was 39 years. For every 100 females, there were 103.1 males. For every 100 females age 18 and over, there were 100.8 males.

The median income for a household in the city was $45,179, and the median income for a family was $48,906. Males had a median income of $34,444 versus $25,000 for females. The per capita income for the city was $18,129. About 1.0% of families and 1.6% of the population were below the poverty line, including 2.1% of those under age 18 and none of those age 65 or over.

== Education ==
The Waterloo Community School District serves the community.
