= Black Hawk County, Iowa =

County in Iowa, United States

- County
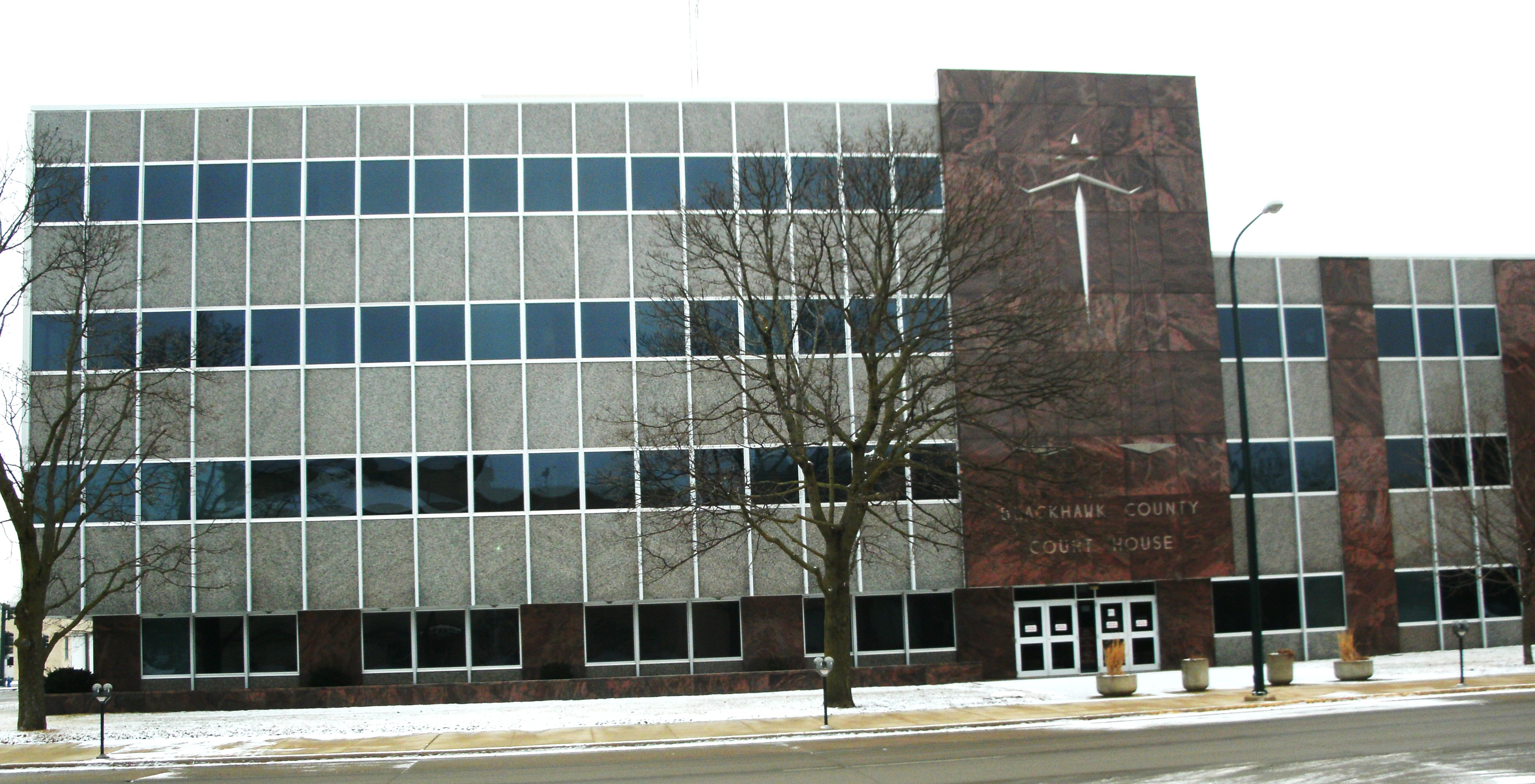
- Black Hawk County Courthouse in Waterloo

- Logo

- Location within the U.S. state of Iowa
- Coordinates: 42°28′08″N 92°18′19″W
- Country: United States
- State: Iowa
- Founded: 1843
- Named for: Black Hawk
- Seat: Waterloo
- Largest city: Waterloo

Area
  - Total: 573 sq mi (1,480 km^{2})
  - Land: 566 sq mi (1,470 km^{2})
  - Water: 6.9 sq mi (18 km^{2}) 1.2%

Population (2020)
  - Total: 131,144
  - Estimate (2025): 131,532 ▲
  - Density: 232/sq mi (89.5/km^{2})
- Time zone: UTC−6 (Central)
  - Summer (DST): UTC−5 (CDT)
- Congressional district: 2nd
- Website: www.blackhawkcounty.iowa.gov
- Iowa county number 07

Black Hawk County is a county in the northeastern part of the U.S. state of Iowa. As of the 2020 census, the population was 131,144, making it Iowa's fifth-most populous county. The county seat is Waterloo.

Black Hawk County is part of the Waterloo – Cedar Falls metropolitan area.

== History ==
Black Hawk County was formed on February 17, 1853, from sections of Buchanan County. It was named after Black Hawk, a Sauk leader during the 1832 Black Hawk War.

== Geography ==
According to the U.S. Census Bureau, the county has an area of 573 square miles (1,480 km^{2}), of which 566 square miles (1,470 km^{2}) is land and 6.9 square miles (18 km^{2}) (1.2%) is water.

The Cedar River roughly divides the county in half from the northwest to the southeast corner. The land is mostly level since much of it is on the river's flood plain.

=== Major highways ===
- Interstate 380
- U.S. Highway 20
- U.S. Highway 63
- U.S. Highway 218
- Iowa Highway 21
- Iowa Highway 27
- Iowa Highway 57
- Iowa Highway 58
- Iowa Highway 175
- Iowa Highway 281

=== Transit ===
- Metropolitan Transit Authority of Black Hawk County

=== Adjacent counties ===
- Bremer County (north)
- Buchanan County (east)
- Benton County (southeast)
- Tama County (southwest)
- Grundy County (west)
- Butler County (northwest)
- Fayette County (northeast)

== Demographics ==
Historical population
Census	Pop.	Note	%±
1850	135		—
1860	8,244		6,006.7%
1870	21,706		163.3%
1880	23,913		10.2%
1890	24,219		1.3%
1900	32,399		33.8%
1910	44,865		38.5%
1920	56,570		26.1%
1930	69,146		22.2%
1940	79,946		15.6%
1950	100,448		25.6%
1960	122,482		21.9%
1970	132,916		8.5%
1980	137,961		3.8%
1990	123,798		−10.3%
2000	128,012		3.4%
2010	131,090		2.4%
2020	131,144		0.0%
2025 (est.)	131,532	▲	0.3%
U.S. Decennial Census; 1790-1960 1900-1990; 1990-2000 2010-2019

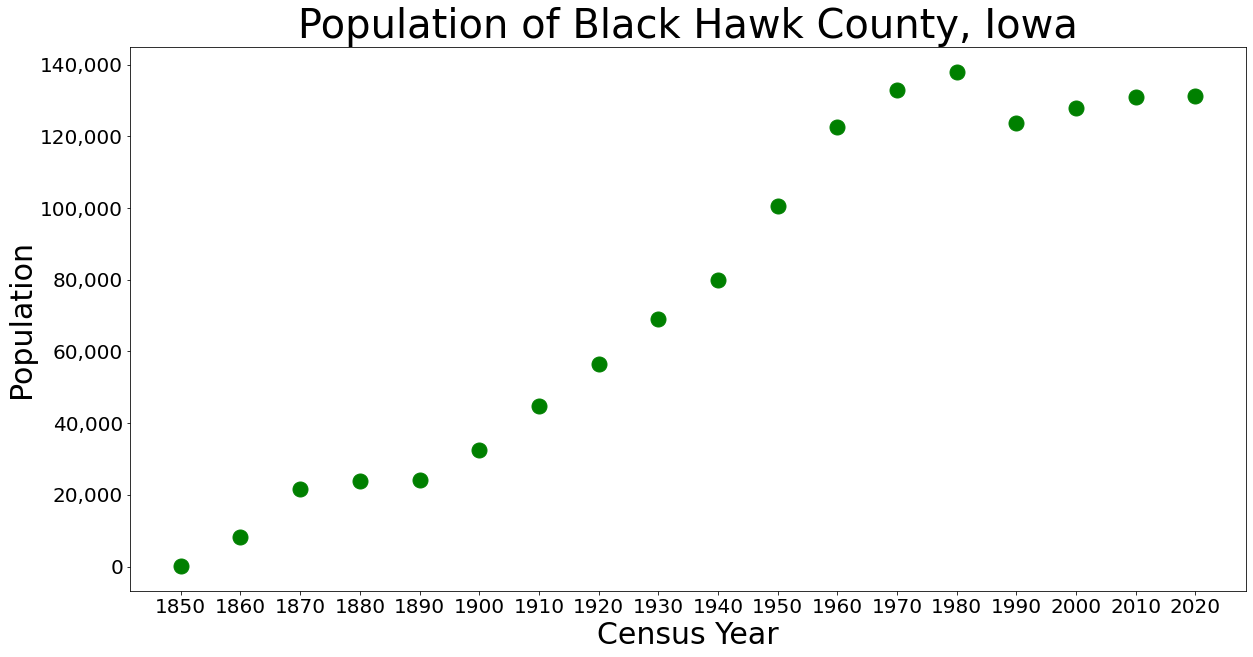
Population of Black Hawk County from US census data

=== 2020 census ===
As of the 2020 census, the county had a population of 131,144. The median age was 36.8 years. 21.8% of residents were under the age of 18 and 17.7% of residents were 65 years of age or older. For every 100 females there were 95.7 males, and for every 100 females age 18 and over there were 93.6 males age 18 and over.

94.55% of the population reported being of one race. The racial makeup of the county was 78.4% White, 10.4% Black or African American, 0.3% American Indian and Alaska Native, 2.6% Asian, 0.7% Native Hawaiian and Pacific Islander, 2.1% from some other race, and 5.4% from two or more races. Hispanic or Latino residents of any race comprised 4.9% of the population.

87.0% of residents lived in urban areas, while 13.0% lived in rural areas.

There were 54,223 households in the county, of which 27.0% had children under the age of 18 living in them. Of all households, 43.0% were married-couple households, 21.1% were households with a male householder and no spouse or partner present, and 28.3% were households with a female householder and no spouse or partner present. About 31.9% of all households were made up of individuals and 12.6% had someone living alone who was 65 years of age or older.

There were 58,559 housing units, of which 54,223 were occupied, and 7.4% were vacant. Among occupied housing units, 65.3% were owner-occupied and 34.7% were renter-occupied. The homeowner vacancy rate was 1.7% and the rental vacancy rate was 8.9%.

=== 2010 census ===
The 2010 census recorded a population of 131,090 in the county, with a population density of 231.2/sq mi (89.3/km^{2}). There were 55,887 housing units, of which 52,470 were occupied.

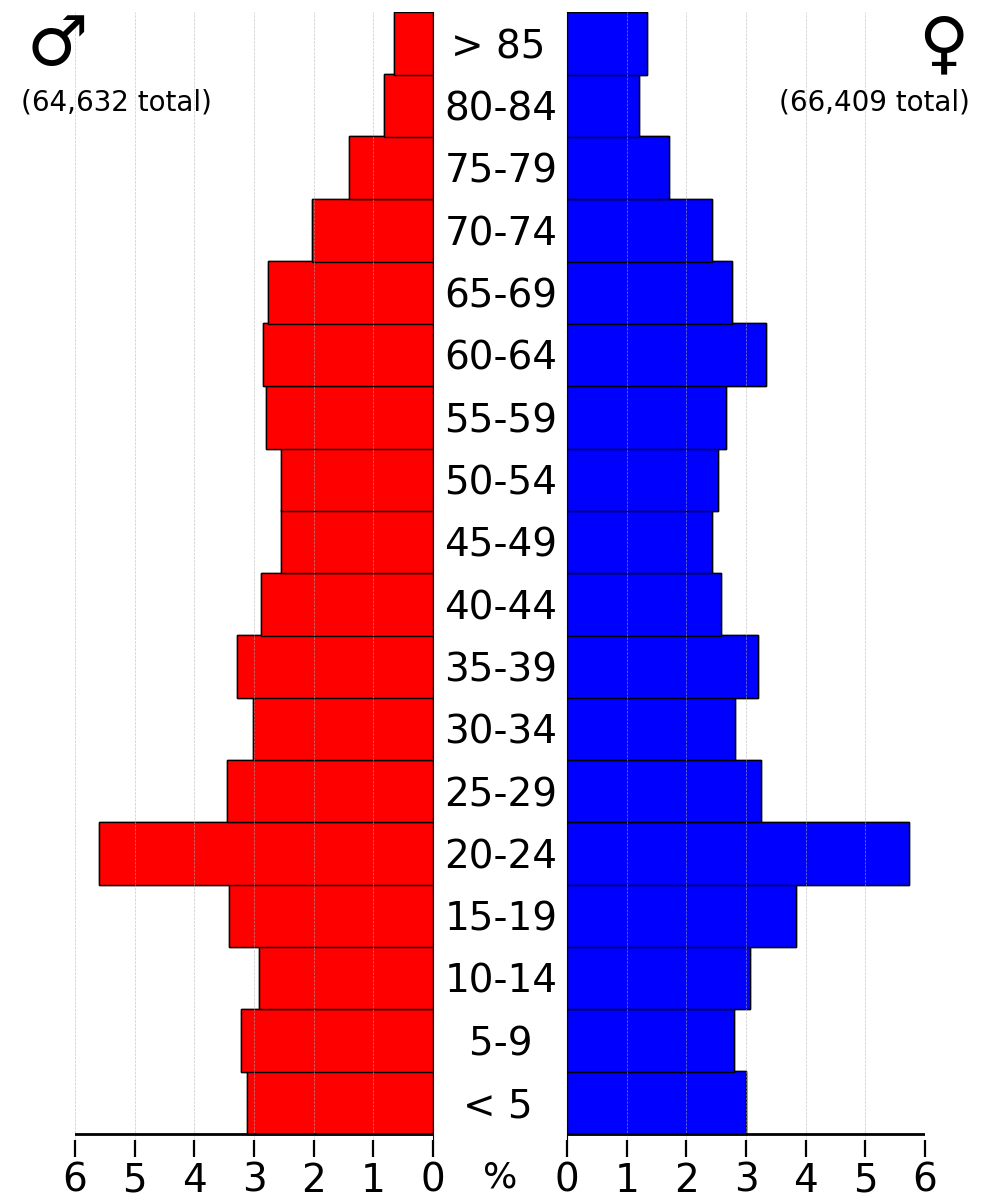
2022 US Census population pyramid for Black Hawk County from ACS 5-year estimates

=== 2000 census ===
At the 2000 census there were 128,012 people, 49,683 households, and 31,946 families in the county. The population density was 226 inhabitants per square mile (87/km^{2}). There were 51,759 housing units at an average density of 91 per square mile (35/km^{2}). The racial makeup of the county was 88.42% White, 7.95% Black or African American, 0.18% Native American, 0.98% Asian, 0.04% Pacific Islander, 0.93% from other races, and 1.49% from two or more races. 1.84%. were Hispanic or Latino of any race.

Of the 49,683 households 29.50% had children under the age of 18 living with them, 50.20% were married couples living together, 10.80% had a female householder with no husband present, and 35.70% were non-families. 27.10% of households were one person and 10.90% were one person aged 65 or older. The average household size was 2.45 and the average family size was 2.97.

Age spread: 23.10% under the age of 18, 15.70% from 18 to 24, 25.20% from 25 to 44, 22.00% from 45 to 64, and 14.00% 65 or older. The median age was 34 years. For every 100 females, there were 92.30 males. For every 100 females age 18 and over, there were 88.80 males.

The median household income was $37,266 and the median family income was $47,398. Males had a median income of $33,138 versus $23,394 for females. The per capita income for the county was $18,885. About 7.90% of families and 13.10% of the population were below the poverty line, including 14.40% of those under age 18 and 8.90% of those age 65 or over.

== Communities ==
=== Cities ===
- Cedar Falls
- Dunkerton
- Elk Run Heights
- Evansdale
- Gilbertville
- Hudson
- Janesville
- Jesup
- La Porte City
- Raymond
- Waterloo

=== Census-designated place ===
- Washburn

=== Other unincorporated communities ===
- Armour
- Benson
- Blessing
- Dewar
- Eagle Center
- Finchford
- Glasgow
- Jubilee
- Raymar
- Voorhies

=== Townships ===
Black Hawk County is divided into seventeen townships:

- Barclay
- Bennington
- Big Creek
- Black Hawk
- Cedar
- Cedar Falls
- Eagle
- East Waterloo
- Fox
- Lester
- Lincoln
- Mount Vernon
- Orange
- Poyner
- Spring Creek
- Union
- Washington

=== Population ranking ===
The population ranking of the following table is based on the 2020 census of Black Hawk County.

† county seat

Rank	City/Town/etc.	Municipal type	Population (2020 Census)	Population (2024 Estimate)
1	† Waterloo	City	67,314	67,386
2	Cedar Falls	City	40,713	41,554
3	Evansdale	City	4,561	4,543
4	Hudson	City	2,546	2,880
5	Jesup (mostly in Buchanan County)	City	193 (2,508 total)	193 (2,534 total)
6	La Porte City	City	2,284	2,295
7	Janesville (mostly in Bremer County)	City	115 (1,034 total)	115 (1,107 total)
8	Elk Run Heights	City	1,069	1,054
9	Washburn	CDP	870	907
10	Dunkerton	City	842	865
11	Gilbertville	City	794	812
12	Raymond	City	759	770

== Politics ==
Black Hawk County has been a Democratic stronghold in Iowa since the late 1980s. In presidential politics, it is one of the most Democratic counties in Iowa. As the state swung hard to the right in the 2010s and 2020s, Black Hawk County—as a major population center, in accordance with most other population centers nationwide—has remained staunchly Democratic. In 2016, however, Donald Trump became the first Republican since 1984 to hold the Democratic candidate's margin to under 10 percent, and in 2024 Trump came the closest to winning the county since 1984.

United States presidential election results for Black Hawk County, Iowa
Year	Republican		Democratic		Third party(ies)	
Year	No.	%	No.	%	No.	%
1880	3,014	64.57%	1,558	33.38%	96	2.06%
1884	3,153	60.21%	2,084	39.79%	0	0.00%
1888	3,106	58.50%	2,127	40.06%	76	1.43%
1892	3,483	57.08%	2,544	41.69%	75	1.23%
1896	4,643	66.05%	2,167	30.83%	220	3.13%
1900	5,010	64.39%	2,512	32.28%	259	3.33%
1904	5,236	66.90%	1,861	23.78%	730	9.33%
1908	5,437	59.67%	3,127	34.32%	548	6.01%
1912	1,601	15.03%	3,702	34.76%	5,346	50.20%
1916	6,742	59.34%	4,270	37.58%	349	3.07%
1920	16,920	76.56%	4,000	18.10%	1,181	5.34%
1924	15,813	65.29%	2,981	12.31%	5,427	22.41%
1928	19,409	69.35%	8,467	30.25%	113	0.40%
1932	14,746	49.54%	14,660	49.25%	359	1.21%
1936	13,666	43.14%	16,793	53.01%	1,222	3.86%
1940	17,132	49.61%	17,305	50.11%	95	0.28%
1944	15,687	48.37%	16,593	51.16%	154	0.47%
1948	16,041	44.28%	19,603	54.11%	586	1.62%
1952	28,671	62.01%	17,360	37.55%	203	0.44%
1956	28,250	57.99%	20,403	41.88%	66	0.14%
1960	28,435	54.11%	24,078	45.82%	38	0.07%
1964	19,744	39.08%	30,716	60.80%	56	0.11%
1968	25,594	51.65%	21,097	42.57%	2,863	5.78%
1972	30,929	57.51%	21,721	40.39%	1,132	2.10%
1976	30,994	50.22%	29,508	47.81%	1,213	1.97%
1980	29,627	46.49%	27,443	43.07%	6,652	10.44%
1984	32,262	50.23%	31,467	48.99%	504	0.78%
1988	24,112	42.93%	31,657	56.36%	402	0.72%
1992	21,398	34.77%	29,584	48.06%	10,568	17.17%
1996	19,322	36.38%	29,651	55.83%	4,136	7.79%
2000	23,468	42.60%	30,112	54.66%	1,505	2.73%
2004	28,046	43.89%	35,392	55.38%	469	0.73%
2008	24,662	38.07%	39,184	60.48%	941	1.45%
2012	26,235	39.07%	39,821	59.31%	1,085	1.62%
2016	27,476	42.66%	32,233	50.05%	4,696	7.29%
2020	29,640	44.51%	35,647	53.53%	1,306	1.96%
2024	30,572	48.60%	31,299	49.76%	1,035	1.65%

== See also ==
- National Register of Historic Places listings in Black Hawk County, Iowa
- Impact of the 2019–20 coronavirus pandemic on the meat industry in the United States
