= Tornado outbreak of May 22–27, 2008 =

2008 natural disaster in the US

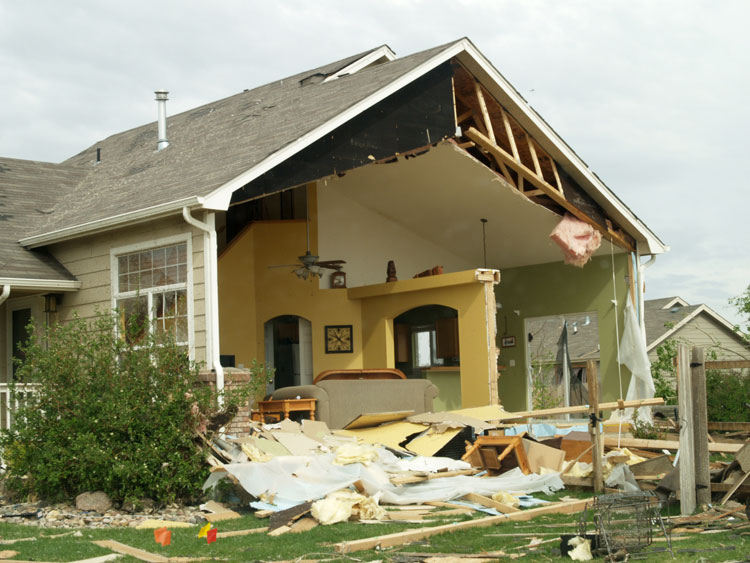
- A house damaged by the Windsor EF3 tornado.

Meteorological history
- Duration: May 22–27, 2008

Tornado outbreak
- Tornadoes: 173
- Max. rating: EF5 tornado
- Duration: 5 days, 6 hours, 35 minutes
- Highest winds: Tornadic – 205 mph (330 km/h) (Parkersburg, Iowa EF5 tornado on May 25)

Overall effects
- Fatalities: 13 fatalities (+1 non-tornadic)
- Injuries: 215 injuries
- Damage: $343 million (2008 USD) $509 million (2025 USD)
- Areas affected: Central United States, Southern Canada
- Part of the tornado outbreaks of 2008

A multi-day tornado outbreak affected the central plains of the United States from May 22–27, 2008. It was also one of the largest continuous tornado outbreaks on record. A total of 173 tornadoes were confirmed, with the most intense activity occurring across the Great Plains. One person was killed when a large wedge tornado struck Windsor, Colorado, and two more deaths were reported in Pratt County, Kansas. One person was also killed near Hugo, Minnesota on May 25 and nine were killed by an EF5 tornado that destroyed most of Parkersburg, Iowa and a small subdivision of New Hartford, Iowa (located near Waterloo, Iowa). Another fatality, caused by lightning related to the storms, occurred in central Kansas.

== Meteorological synopsis ==
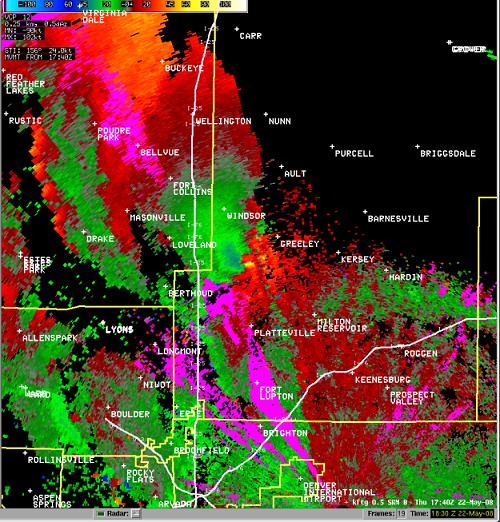
National Weather Service doppler radar (Velocity – Storm Relative Motion) image at 1735 UTC showing tornado-producing supercell thunderstorm near Windsor, Colorado. (NWS Colorado/Boulder)

On May 22, a low pressure system developed across the Rocky Mountains, with a warm front stretching across the central Plains and a trough stretching north towards Alberta and eastern British Columbia. A moderate risk had already been issued for portions of northern Kansas on May 21, and was upgraded into a high risk during the afternoon of May 22. It was the first high risk outlook in Kansas since May 5, 2007, one day after an EF5 tornado struck the town of Greensburg, Kansas.

Severe thunderstorm and tornado watches extended from eastern Wyoming into northern Kansas early on May 22. Just before noon, a mile-wide (1.6 km) tornado was reported near Greeley, Colorado, which is about one hour north of Denver. It moved northwest, an unusual path for tornadoes. It struck the town of Windsor at EF3 strength, causing extensive damage to homes and buildings in town. One person was killed at the Missile Silo Campground near Greeley. An EF2 tornado struck the city of Laramie, Wyoming causing some damage to roofs of businesses and tossing trucks across I-80. Several other tornadoes occurred in Kansas, and even a few touched down as far west as southern California that afternoon.

Numerous tornadoes were reported across northern Kansas; however, damage was limited due to the sparsely populated areas it affected. Another intense storm traveled across northern Oklahoma during the evening hours. At least 45 tornadoes were reported across the region on May 22.

On May 23, thunderstorms fired up across much of the same areas, where a moderate risk of severe storms was issued for northern Kansas. Tornado watches stretched from Wyoming into Oklahoma. Supercells were reported across northern Kansas and Colorado as well as southern Kansas where an intense supercell was traveling near the areas hit by powerful tornadoes on May 4–5, 2007. An EF4 tornado affected areas near Quinter. Greensburg, still in the rebuilding process from the EF5 tornado that destroyed most of the town more than one year prior, narrowly missed getting struck again. Homes and trailers were also reported destroyed in Pratt and Lane Counties. There were 55 tornadoes confirmed in the Dodge City warning area alone and over 80 tornadoes confirmed that day and night, with two deaths reported in Pratt County and at least five people were injured in Kansas alone with the most across Stafford County.

On May 24, a slight risk was issued for much of the Missouri River corridor as well as areas along I-35 from Kansas City to Oklahoma City and later into portions of northern Texas. Tornado watches were issued from Minnesota (at the Canada–US border) to Oklahoma with a severe thunderstorm watch in parts of Texas. One thunderstorm produced several tornadoes across Kingfisher and Garfield Counties south of Enid. Most tornadoes were caught on tape by a helicopter reporter for KWTV-TV in Oklahoma City which was also repeatedly broadcast on CNN. One of the tornadoes captured live on CNN and KWTV destroyed a hog farm. None of the employees who worked at the farm were injured, although a few pigs inside the structures were hurt. However, none of the pigs were found dead. Tornadoes were also reported across the Dakotas during the evening hours for a total of 13 reports throughout the day.

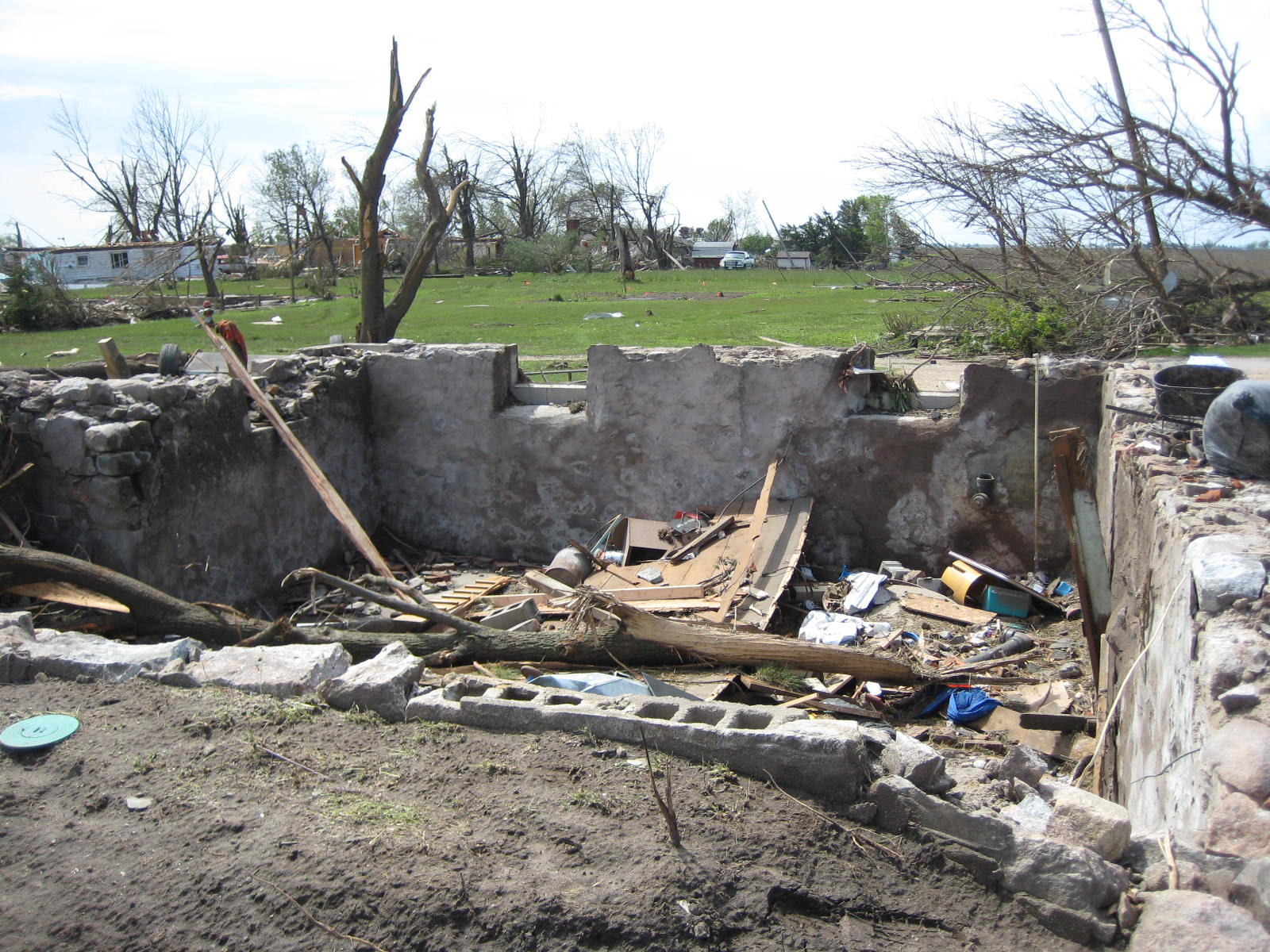
House that was reduced to its basement in Parkersburg, Iowa

On May 25, notices for moderate risk of severe weather were issued for northern Kansas, southern Nebraska, eastern Minnesota, northeastern Iowa, and western Wisconsin with a slight risk from Texas to northwestern Ontario. Watches extended along all the corridor and storms developed in four different areas including northern Texas, northern Kansas, central Minnesota and Iowa and southern Manitoba. One particularly violent tornado touched down and struck the Iowa town of Parkersburg, and the northern side of New Hartford. This long track tornado also destroyed homes near Dunkerton and near the Waterloo Municipal Airport. That tornado killed nine people and was later rated an EF5, the first since the Greensburg, Kansas tornado. According to the SPC Storm Reports, 50 tornadoes have been reported throughout the day.

At 4:55 pm, an EF3 tornado touched down in Lino Lakes, a northern suburb of the Minneapolis-St. Paul area. The tornado then moved into Hugo where it caused major damage. Around 50 houses were destroyed and 150 damaged in Creek View Preserve and Water's Edge neighborhoods of Hugo, and 500 homes were damaged in total. A two-year-old child was killed and nine people were seriously injured.

A moderate risk of severe weather was issued for central Kansas from the same storm system for May 26 while a large slight risk area was issued by the SPC from Texas to southern Quebec and Ontario, while Environment Canada issued a slight risk for severe weather for southwestern Ontario. The moderate risk in Kansas was a bust as the severe weather was limited to just a few tornadoes across western Texas and central Kansas. Meanwhile, only isolated strong thunderstorms across southern and eastern Ontario during the evening hours while very limited activity across the Great Lakes and Ohio Valley regions. However, two weak tornadoes were later confirmed north of Sudbury and North Bay. Minimal severe activity was reported on May 27 and May 28.

== Confirmed tornadoes ==
Confirmed tornadoes by Enhanced Fujita rating
EFU	EF0	EF1	EF2	EF3	EF4	EF5	Total
0	107	41	14	9	1	1	173

- Note: Three tornadoes in Canada were rated according to the Fujita scale, but are included in the chart below using their corresponding number rating.

=== Windsor, Colorado ===
Windsor, Colorado
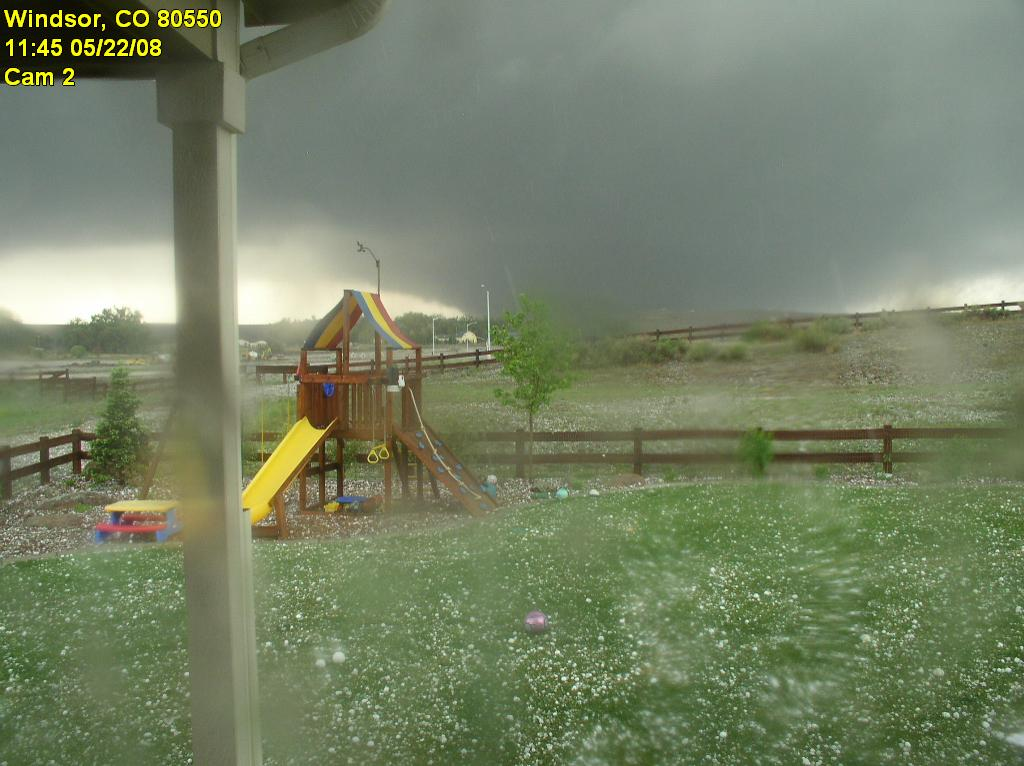
- Security camera still of the tornado taken two miles away to the east.

Meteorological history
- Formed: May 22, 2008, 11:26 a.m. MDT (UTC–04:00)
- Dissipated: May 22, 2008, 12:16 p.m. MDT (UTC–04:00)
- Duration: 50 minutes

EF3 tornado
- on the Enhanced Fujita scale
- Highest winds: 165 mph (266 km/h)

Overall effects
- Fatalities: 1
- Injuries: 78
- Damage: $147 million (2008 USD) $218 million (2025 USD)

Just before noon on May 22, this mile-wide EF3 wedge tornado developed between the towns of Platteville and Gilcrest, Colorado. The tornado was caught on tape and accompanied by baseball sized hail as it traveled near Interstate 25. The tornado moved along an unusual northwestward path, causing extensive damage to crops, outbuildings, and irrigation systems in this rural area. The tornado then passed east of Milliken, causing additional property damage before it struck the Missile Silo Park Campground west of Greeley, where one man was killed in his motor home. Large metal electrical transmission poles were snapped off at their bases near the campground, indicative of EF3 intensity. Tractor-trailers were flipped and hundreds of power poles were snapped as the tornado continued northwestward. The large wedge tornado then struck the town of Windsor directly, damaging hundreds of homes and several businesses at EF2 to EF3 strength. The most intense damage occurred in the eastern part of town, where some homes lost roofs and exterior walls, and trees sustained extensive denuding and some debarking. An automotive business almost entirely collapsed, and a small two-story office building had its second story torn off, and sustained collapse of exterior walls on the first floor. A train in town was derailed, with 15 rail cars overturned and a lumber car destroyed. The tornado also flattened Windsor's main feedlot and destroyed a dairy barn, killing numerous cows. The Windmill Daycare Center sustained a direct hit, where about 150 children were located but none were injured as they took cover from the storm, which blew out most of the building's windows and removed a large section of its roof. The tornado continued through rural areas north of Windsor and narrowed. A barn and two outbuildings were destroyed as it passed near the town of Timnath. A center pivot was overturned and a parked car was swept around the corner of a house and rolled over as well. The tornado eventually dissipated northeast of Fort Collins. In addition to the fatality, 78 injuries occurred, ranging from cuts and bruises to broken bones. 850 homes were damaged, and nearly 300 homes were left uninhabitable or destroyed along the path.

The Windsor tornado was the first fatal and the first EF3 tornado in Colorado since a nighttime EF3 tornado hit Holly in Prowers County and killed two people near the Kansas state line as part of a similar outbreak on March 28, 2007. The Windsor tornado caused a total of $147 million in damages, making it the 4th costliest disaster in Colorado state history, and the costliest tornado in Colorado history as well. In addition to being the costliest tornado in Colorado history, it was also the widest, and had the 2nd longest path length of any Colorado tornado as well.

=== Parkersburg–New Hartford, Iowa ===
Parkersburg–New Hartford, Iowa
- The tornado seen east of Parkersburg.

Meteorological history
- Formed: May 25, 2008, 4:48 p.m. CDT (UTC–05:00)
- Dissipated: May 25, 2008, 5:58 p.m. CDT (UTC–05:00)
- Duration: 1 hour, 10 minutes

EF5 tornado
- on the Enhanced Fujita scale
- Highest winds: 205 mph (330 km/h)

Overall effects
- Fatalities: 9
- Injuries: 70
- Damage: $75 million (2008 USD)

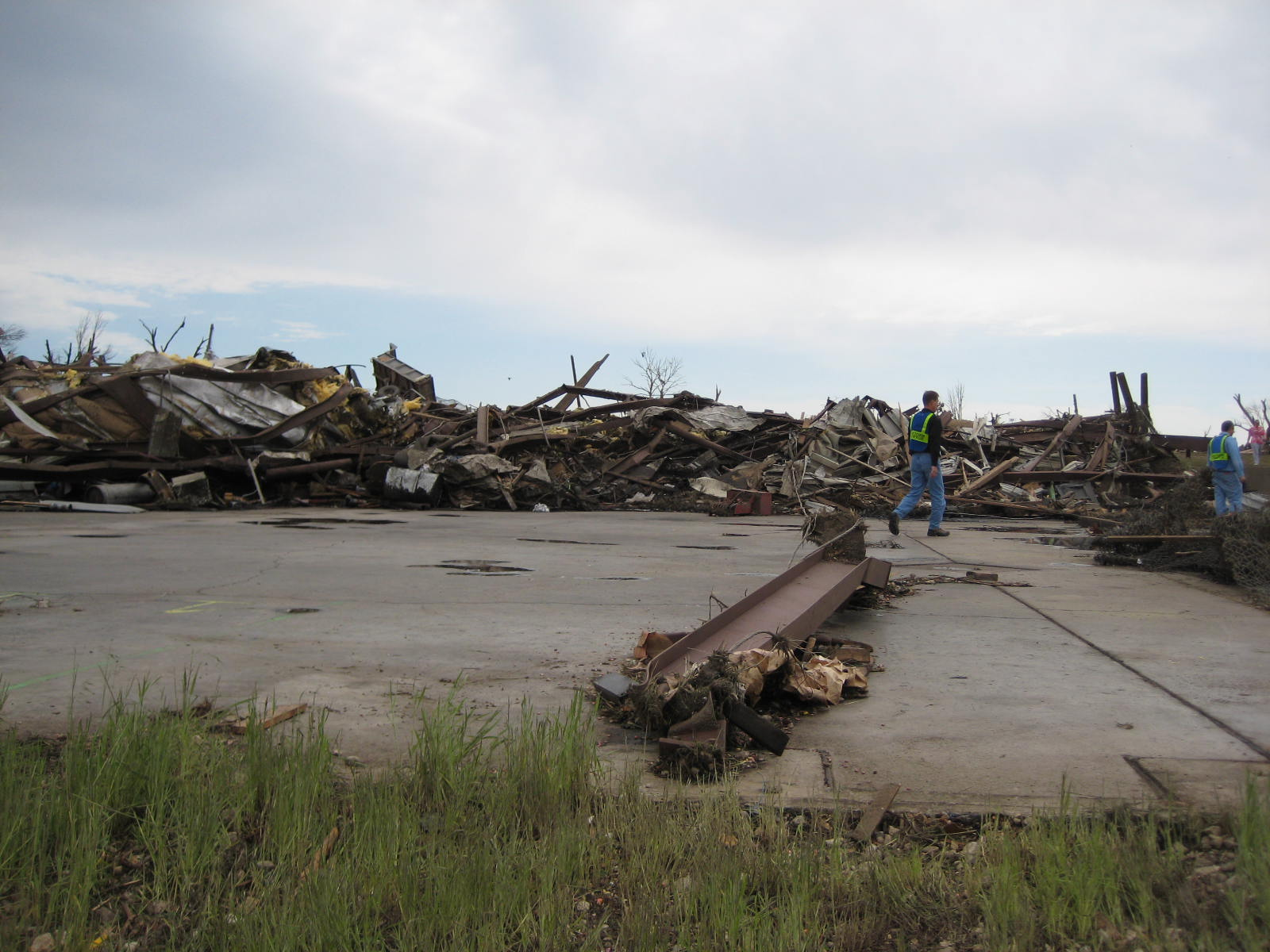
EF5 damage to an industrial building in western Parkersburg.

A strong supercell developed in northeast Iowa, west of Waterloo in the late afternoon of May 25, 2008. The first tornado warning of the cell was issued at 4:22 pm CDT (21:22 UTC) for the Parkersburg area. This large and incredibly violent tornado developed shortly after, touching down two miles south of Aplington in Grundy County at 4:48 pm CDT. East of Aplington, the tornado traveled through a series of farm fields, leaving distinct cycloidal marks in the corn stubble. It then tracked toward Parkersburg, becoming violent, intensifying to EF5 strength, and growing into a large wedge-shaped tornado as it tore through the southern part of the community just before 5:00 pm CDT. Numerous homes and businesses, two banks, and a high school were destroyed as the south side of Parkersburg was essentially flattened. As the tornado entered town, a large and well-constructed metal frame industrial building that was being converted into a church was obliterated at EF5 intensity, with the structure's metal beam frame mangled into a pile and pushed off of the foundation. Beams were twisted and sheared off at their bases at this location. Residential areas in Parkersburg were devastated by the tornado, as whole neighborhoods were leveled and entire rows of homes were swept away, leaving only basements behind in some cases. Some of the homes swept away in town were bolted to their foundations. A rebar support set into the foundation of one home was found snapped in half, hardwood trees throughout southern Parkersburg were completely debarked and denuded, and shrubs were uprooted and stripped in some areas as well. Aplington-Parkersburg High School sustained EF4 structural damage, and reinforced concrete light poles near the school were snapped and dragged along the ground by the tornado, indicative of extremely intense low-level inflow winds. As the tornado exited at the east side of town, the tornado struck a golf course and a newly built subdivision. Multiple large and well-built homes with anchor bolts were swept completely away at that location. Two of these homes had no visible debris left anywhere near the foundations, one of which was built "with above standard construction methods." At one home that was swept away in this subdivision, a concrete walk-out basement wall was partially pushed over, and the concrete basement floor sustained cracking. Structural debris from the town was wind-rowed in long streaks through fields in this area, with much of the debris finely granulated into small fragments, some no larger than coins. The tornado was estimated to have been about 7/10 of a mile (1.1 of a km) wide as it struck Parkersburg. Seven people died in town, several of which were taking shelter in basements.

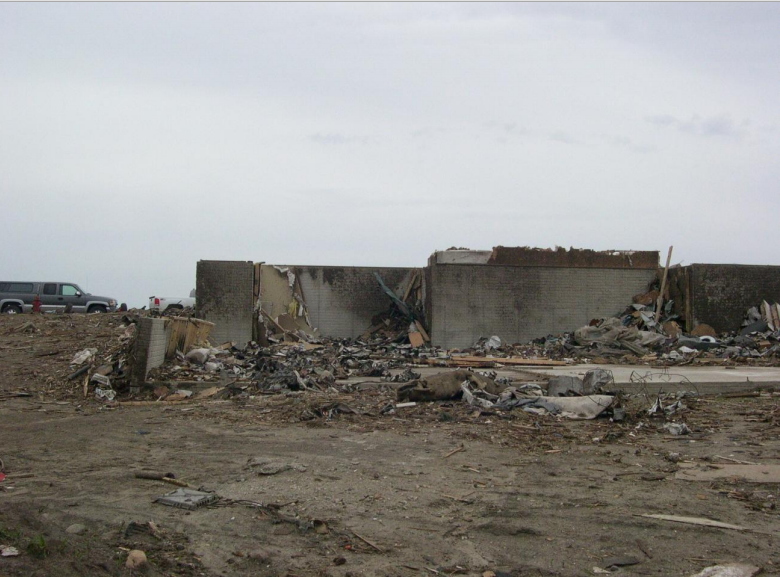
A large and well-built house that sustained EF5 damage at the east edge of Parkersburg. Note the concrete walk-out basement wall partially pushed over on the left.

After passing through Parkersburg, the EF5 tornado continued eastward towards the neighboring town of New Hartford. Additional rural homes were obliterated and swept away in this area, and a granary was destroyed. The tornado maintained EF5 strength as it reached New Hartford, impacting a housing development on the northern side of the town at 5:09 pm CDT. Multiple well-built homes with anchor bolts were again completely swept away, and vehicles were thrown long distances and mangled beyond recognition, a few of which only had their frames left. One home in this area had even its basement contents swept away, including the home-owner who was killed. Numerous headstones were toppled at the New Hartford Cemetery, and shrubs and trees were completely debarked. Past New Hartford, the tornado weakened dramatically and passed just north of Waterloo and Cedar Falls, shrinking to about 1/4 mile (400 m) in width as it continued to impact rural areas. Damage along this section of the path was mostly minor, though a few farms sustained EF2 damage. Intense cycloidal marks were again noted in farm fields in this area. As the tornado approached Dunkerton, it turned to the east-northeast, missing the town and growing up to 1.2 miles (1.9 km) wide. Some re-intensification occurred in this area, as consistent high-end EF2 damage was noted at multiple farms. Numerous hog containment buildings were destroyed, and a few homes that were impacted sustained some collapse of exterior walls. Mud and corn stubble was picked up from farm fields near Dunkerton and plastered thickly against fences, power poles, and houses. Shortly before reaching Fairbank, the tornado abruptly dissipated.

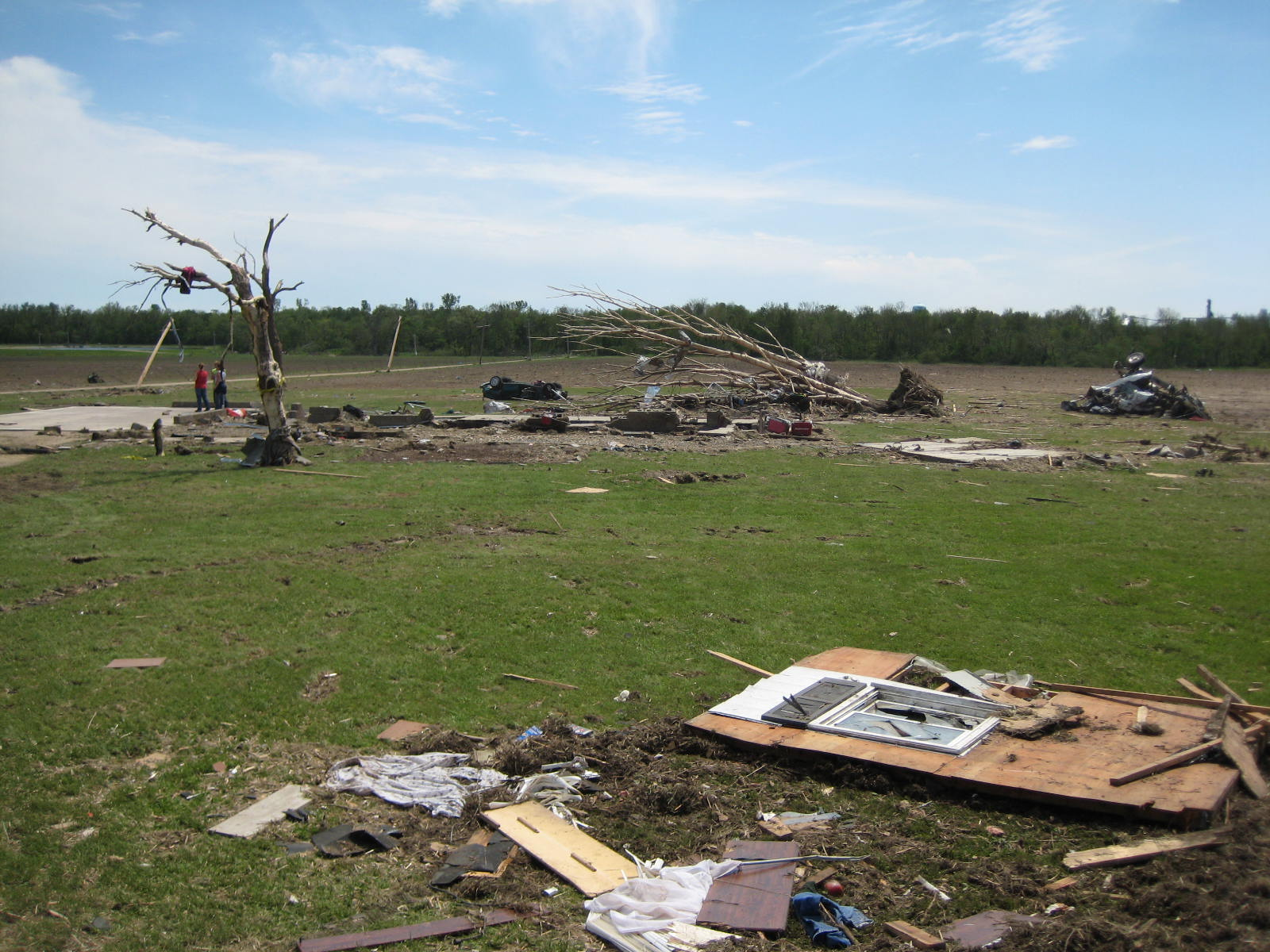
Remains of a house that was swept away at EF5 strength at the north edge of New Hartford.

Seven people were killed in Parkersburg and two were killed in New Hartford, where the housing development was destroyed. 288 homes in Parkersburg, and 88 in and around New Hartford were damaged or destroyed. While initially rated high-end EF4, a final assessment determined that the tornado was an EF5 with estimated peak winds of about 205 miles per hour (330 km/h). It was determined that 17 homes and an industrial building sustained EF5 damage along the path. According to FEMA and the Iowa Homeland Security and Emergency Management, damage was preliminary estimated at $6 million in northern Iowa including more than $3 million in Butler County alone. While the tornado was caught on tape and photographed by spotters, a surveillance camera inside a bank in Parkersburg also caught the tornado on tape as the storm passed over the building. Another surveillance camera showed the tornado ripping the roof off a house across a street before the video feed was lost. After the tornado, Governor Chet Culver declared Butler and Black Hawk counties disaster areas due to the extensive storm damage. The tornado was the first F5 or EF5 tornado in Iowa since one hit Jordan on June 13, 1976, and the second deadliest in Iowa since official record-keeping began in 1950. The deadliest tornado affected the Charles City area on May 15, 1968, and killed 13 while producing F5 damage. On May 29, The Waterloo-Cedar Falls Courier reported that lightweight debris from the Waterloo area, including photographs, check stubs, and "greeting cards and business records" from a Waterloo Walgreens, had been found in Prairie du Chien, Wisconsin, over 100 miles (160 km) away.

== Non-tornadic events ==
Heavy rains fell throughout much of the weekend across southern Alberta with local areas reporting as much as 8 inches (200 mm) according to the Weather Network. Several rivers experienced rapid rise of the water levels including the Elbow River which threatened to overflow near the Calgary area. Several areas across the province were under flood warnings.

== See also ==
- List of North American tornadoes and tornado outbreaks
  - List of tornadoes with confirmed satellite tornadoes
- List of F5 and EF5 tornadoes
- Tornado outbreak of May 1–3, 2008
- Tornado outbreak sequence of May 7–11, 2008
- Tornado outbreak of December 10–11, 2021
