= 2008 Parkersburg–New Hartford tornado =

Devastating and fatal EF5 tornado in Iowa in 2008

Coordinates: 42.5512°N 92.882°W

- Clockwise from top: The tornado, as it appeared east of Parkersburg; A classroom in the Aplington–Parkersburg High School that sustained collapse; A panoramic view of several destroyed homes in Parkersburg; Radar reflectivity imagery of the tornado as it entered Parkersburg

Meteorological history
- Formed: May 25, 2008; 4:48 p.m. CDT (UTC–05:00)
- Dissipated: May 25, 2008; 5:58 p.m. CDT (UTC–05:00)
- Duration: 1 hour, 10 minutes

EF5 tornado
- on the Enhanced Fujita scale
- Max width: 2,100 yards (1.2 mi; 1.9 km)
- Path length: 40.97 miles (65.93 km)
- Highest winds: 205 mph (330 km/h)

Overall effects
- Fatalities: 9
- Injuries: 70
- Damage: $75 million (2008 USD)
- Areas affected: Butler and Black Hawk Counties, Iowa; particularly Parkersburg and New Hartford
- Part of the Tornado outbreak of May 22–27, 2008 and Tornadoes of 2008

During the afternoon of May 25, 2008, a large, deadly, and long-tracked EF5 tornado moved through Butler and Black Hawk Counties in the U.S. state of Iowa, producing a damage path 40.97 mi (65.93 km) long over the span of one hour and 10 minutes. This tornado particularly affected the town of Parkersburg, Iowa, northwest of the Waterloo–Cedar Falls metropolitan area, destroying 288 homes in the southern half of the town. Within Parkersburg limits, the Aplington–Parkersburg High School was destroyed, receiving an EF4 rating. To the east, New Hartford was also affected, where an estimated 88 homes were destroyed.

The tornado killed nine (seven in Parkersburg and two in New Hartford), injured at least 70, caused approximately $75 million (Note: $75 million in 2008 is approximately $112,152,000 today.) in damages, and reached estimated winds of 205 mph (330 km/h) based on the destruction of multiple well-engineered and well-anchored homes in and around Parkersburg. Historically, it was the second tornado to be rated EF5 since the implementation of the Enhanced Fujita scale in February of 2007 (the first being a large and destructive tornado that completely destroyed Greensburg, Kansas, on May 4, 2007), the first tornado to be assigned a "5" rating in Iowa since 1976, and the only EF5-rated tornado of the 2008 season. To this date, this tornado also remains the only official EF5 tornado in the state of Iowa.

== Meteorological synopsis ==
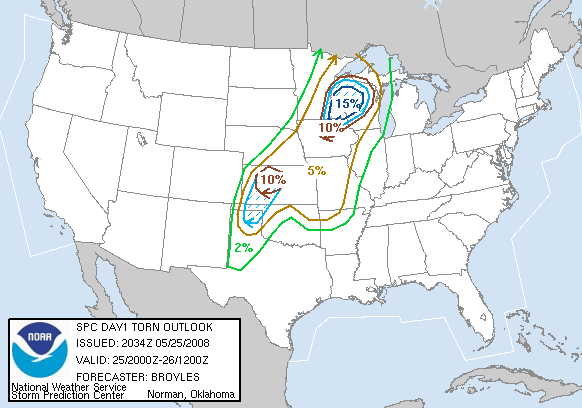
NWS Tornado probability for May 25, 2008

On May 18, meteorologists identified a pattern indicative of severe weather. A large scale trough was predicted to move across the northern United States, with associated moisture return from the Gulf of Mexico and ample instability forming a classic plains severe weather setup.

By May 21, models showcased an increasingly strong and robust negatively-titled trough rapidly moving across the United States before slowly stalling through the Central Plains. A large ridge present was set to breakdown, allowing a strong surface front to move across the area. Moderate instability was already forming due to a deep forming moist-layer and warm air advection from the south. The National Weather Service indicated that the "combination should be sufficient for a multiple-day threat for relatively widespread severe storms."

On May 25, notices for a moderate risk of severe weather were issued for northern Kansas, southern Nebraska, eastern Minnesota, northeastern Iowa, and western Wisconsin with a slight risk from Texas to northwestern Ontario. Severe weather watches spanned the entire zone, with storms forming in four separate locations including northern Texas, northern Kansas, central Minnesota and Iowa, and southern Manitoba. As forecast, the strong trough would dig into northern areas of the United States. A low-level jet that was stronger than forecast began to transport ample moisture northwards towards the severe weather interest area. As early as 12:30 pm Central Daylight Time (CDT) (17:00 UTC), strong instability began to climb. Dew points reached above 75 °F (24 °C). Models began to showcase a broken line of discrete supercells moving east to northeast, and with very little interference and a broad warm sector, the supercells would be able to become extremely strong.

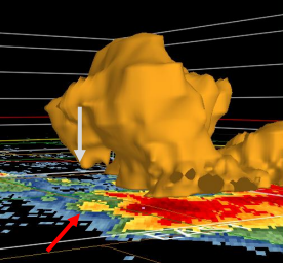
The 3D view of a rearflank descending reflectivity core (DRC) is indicated by gray arrow occurring about 7 to 11 minutes before the first spotter report of a tornado south of Aplington, Iowa. The red arrow indicates the location of the DRC on low level radar display

At 12:43 pm CDT (17:43 UTC), the Storm Prediction Center identified a rapidly moving and strong jet streak was approaching from Minnesota to Iowa through water vapor imagery. Supercells began to rapidly intensify by 3:50 pm CDT (20:43), prompting upgrades in watches. A cluster of strong supercells in northern Iowa began to both interact and intensify, merging into each other and forming a descending-reflectivity core over the southern cell's developing mesocyclone, a micro-scale interaction indicative of aiding in tornadogenesis. Simultaneously, low-level rotation on the southern supercell rapidly increased. Strong gravity waves may have also assisted in tornadogenesis amongst the supercell cluster.

== Tornado summary ==
=== Formation and track into Parkersburg ===
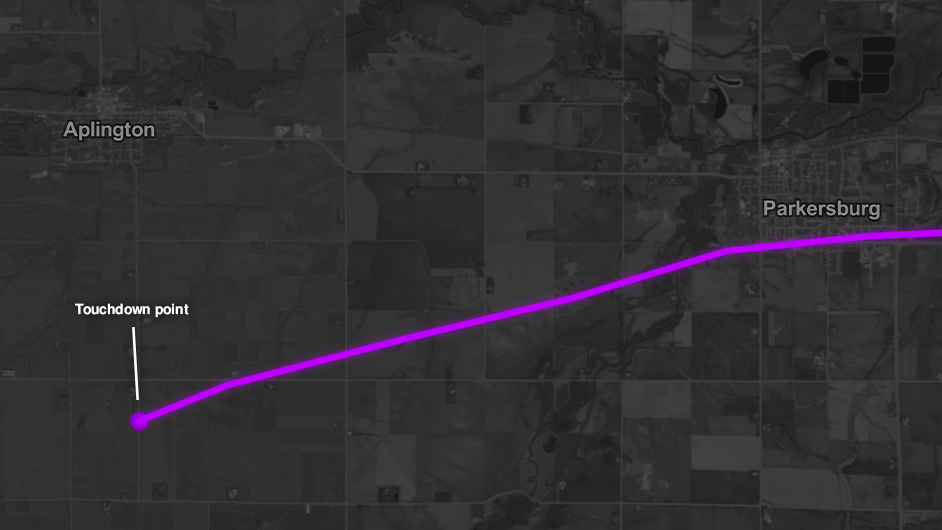
The touchdown point and initial track of the tornado

The southern supercell in a cluster of rapidly intensifying cells began rotating in northeast Iowa, west of Waterloo. The first tornado warning of the cell was issued at 4:22 pm CDT (21:22 UTC), encompassing the Parkersburg area. As a tornado-cyclone materialized, a funnel cloud developed, and a tornado touched down two miles south of Aplington near the Butler and Grundy County line at 4:48 pm CDT (21:22 UTC).

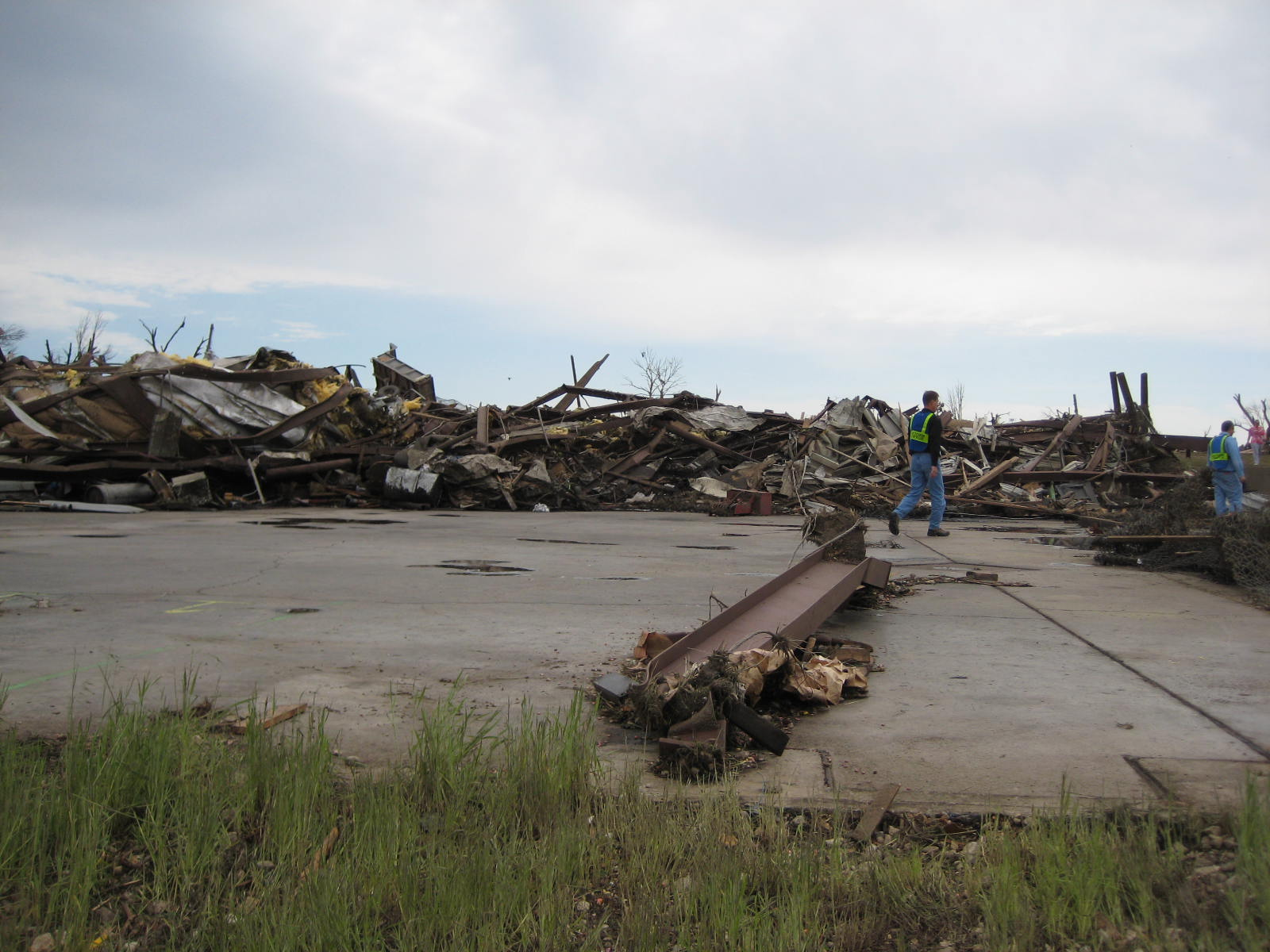
EF5 damage to an industrial building in western Parkersburg

East of Aplington, the tornado traveled through a series of farm fields, leaving distinct cycloidal marks in the corn stubble. The tornado rapidly grew in size right after touchdown, and wind-rowing of grass and farm debris indicated a violent vortex. It then tracked into Parkersburg, becoming extremely violent as it intensified to EF5 strength, and grew into a large wedge-shaped tornado as it tracked through southern Parkersburg shortly before 5:00 pm CDT. (22:00 UTC). Numerous homes and businesses, two banks, and Aplington–Parkersburg High School were destroyed. As the tornado entered town, a large and well-constructed metal frame industrial building that was being converted into a church was obliterated at EF5 intensity, with the structure's metal beam frame mangled into a pile and pushed off of the foundation. Beams were twisted and sheared off at their bases at this location.

Residential areas in Parkersburg were hit with EF5 strength by the tornado, as whole neighborhoods destroyed, leaving only basements behind in some cases. Some of the homes swept away in town were bolted to their foundations. A rebar support set into the foundation of one home was found snapped in half, hardwood trees throughout southern Parkersburg were completely debarked and denuded, and shrubs were uprooted and stripped in some areas as well.

CCTV loop from the First State Bank in Parkersburg, showing a nearby house getting hit by the tornado

Aplington-Parkersburg High School sustained EF4 structural damage, and reinforced concrete light poles near the school were snapped and dragged along the ground by the tornado, indicative of extremely intense low-level inflow winds. As the tornado exited at the east side of town, the tornado struck a golf course and a newly built subdivision. Multiple large and well-built homes with anchor bolts were swept completely away at that location. Two of these homes had no visible debris left anywhere near the foundations, one of which was built "with above standard construction methods." At one home that was swept away in this subdivision, a concrete walk-out basement wall was partially pushed over, and the concrete basement floor sustained cracking. Structural debris from the town was wind-rowed in long streaks through fields in this area, with much of the debris finely granulated into small fragments, some no larger than coins. The tornado was estimated to have been about 7/10 mile (1.1 km) wide as it struck Parkersburg. Seven people died in town, several of which were taking shelter in basements.

=== New Hartford ===
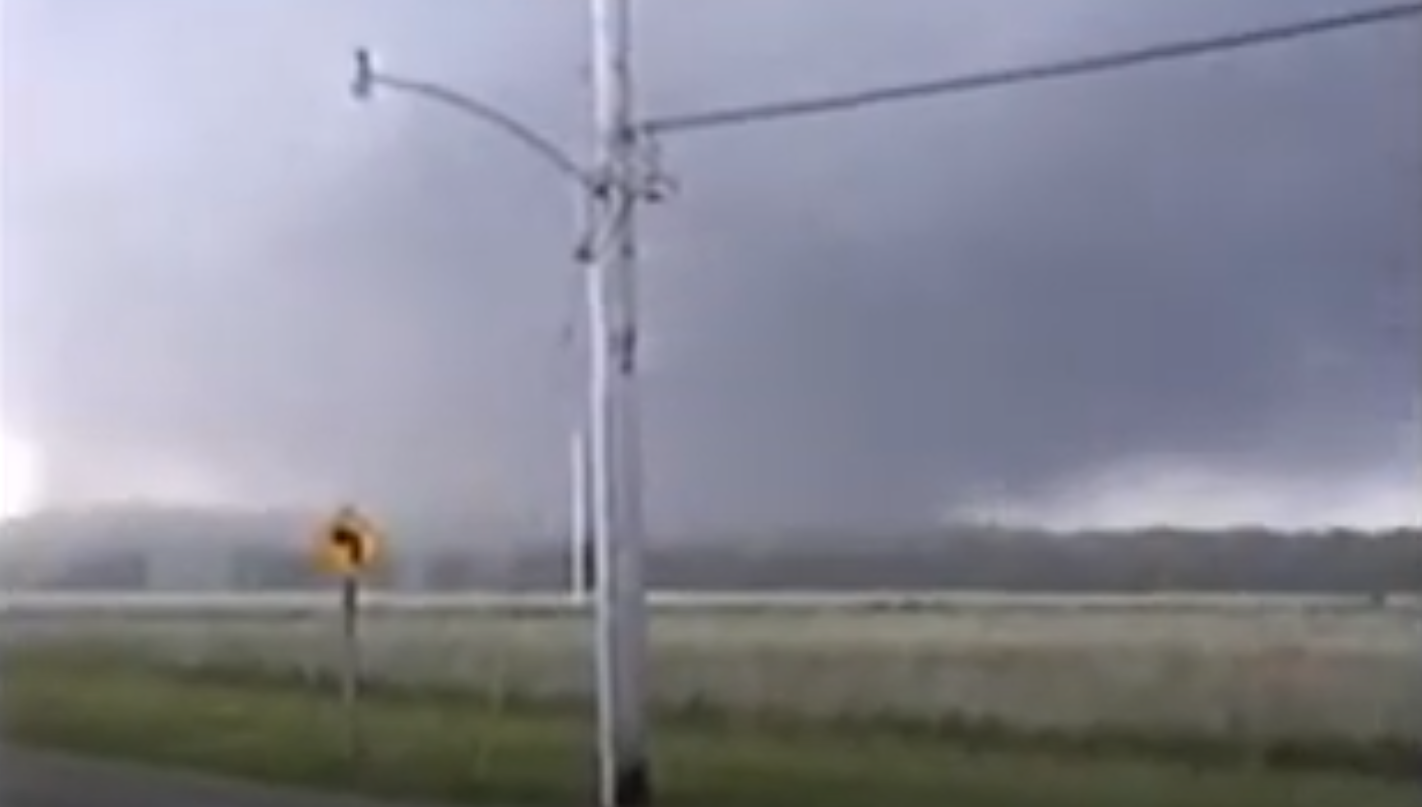
The tornado east of Parkersburg

After passing through Parkersburg, the EF5 tornado continued eastward towards the neighboring city of New Hartford. Tree damage between the two towns was intense, with rows of trees being blown over and ripped from the ground. Pavement was peeled from the ground along Highway 57, and telephone poles were slanted towards the direction of the funnel. Ground scouring during this phase was intense, with deep cycloidal marks found in crop fields. Additional rural homes were obliterated and swept away in this area, and a granary was destroyed. The tornado maintained EF5 strength as it reached New Hartford, impacting a housing development on the northern side of the town at 5:09 pm CDT (22:09 UTC). Multiple well-built homes with anchor bolts were again completely swept away, and vehicles were thrown long distances and mangled beyond recognition, a few of which only had their frames left. One home in this area had its basement contents swept away; the homeowner was killed.. Numerous headstones were toppled at the New Hartford Cemetery, and shrubs and trees were completely debarked.

=== Weakening, track near Waterloo and dissipation ===
Past New Hartford, the tornado weakened dramatically and passed just north of Waterloo and Cedar Falls, shrinking to about 1/4 mile (400 m) in width as it continued to impact rural areas. Damage along this section of the path was mostly minor, though a few farms sustained EF2 damage. Intense cycloidal marks were again noted in farm fields in this area. As the tornado approached Dunkerton, it turned to the east-northeast, missing the town and growing up to 1.2 miles (1.9 km) wide. Some re-intensification occurred in this area, as consistent high-end EF2 damage was noted at multiple farms. Numerous hog containment buildings were destroyed, and a few homes sustained collapse of exterior walls. Mud and corn stubble was picked up from farm fields near Dunkerton and plastered thickly against fences, power poles, and houses. Shortly before reaching Fairbank, the tornado abruptly dissipated.

== Aftermath ==
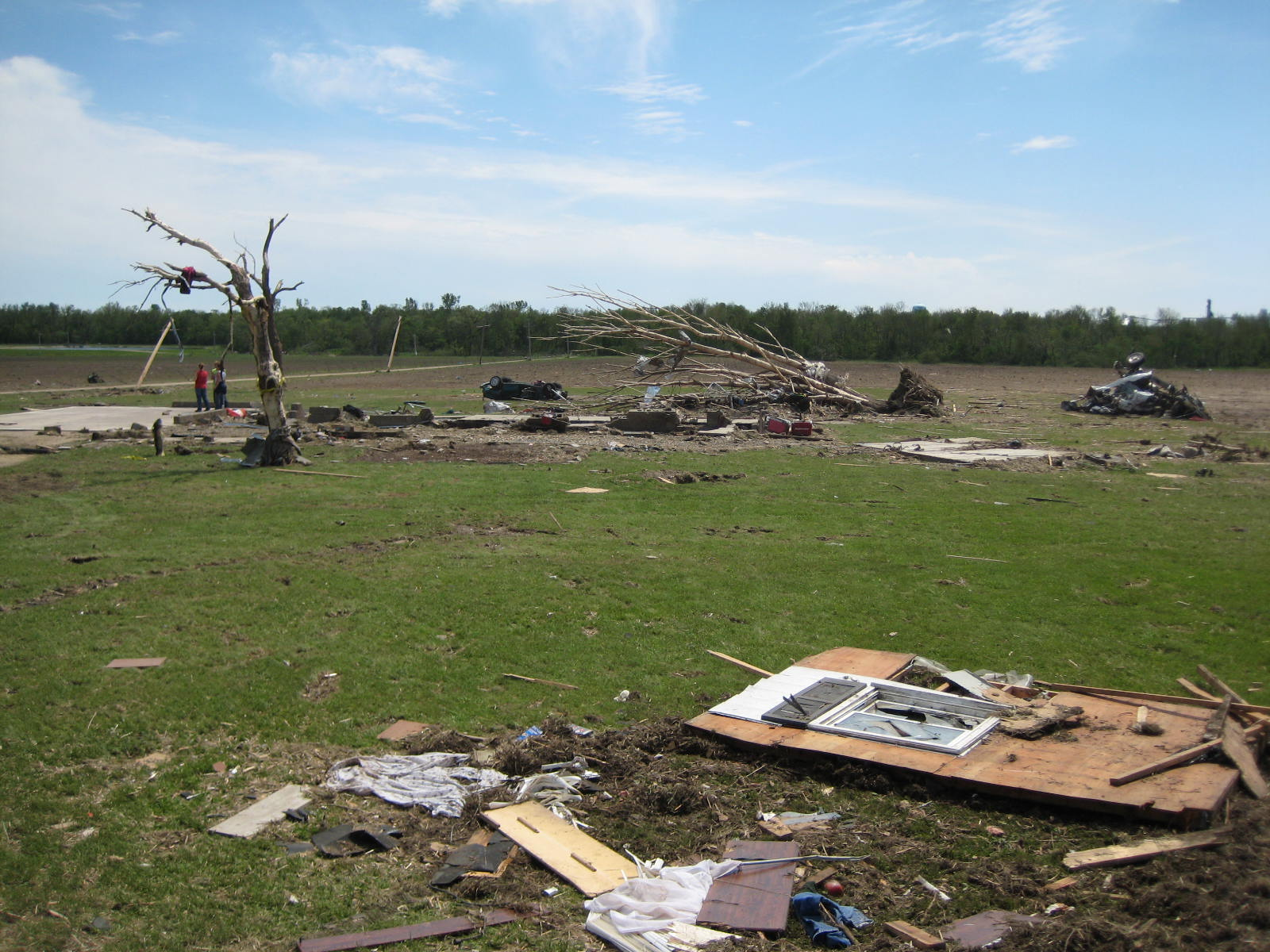
Remains of a house that was swept away at EF5 strength at the north edge of New Hartford

Seven people were killed in Parkersburg and two were killed in New Hartford, where the housing development was destroyed. There were 288 homes in Parkersburg and 88 in and around New Hartford that were damaged or destroyed. The National Weather Service's assessment determined that the tornado was an EF5 with estimated peak winds of about 205 miles per hour (330 km/h). According to the Federal Emergency Management Agency (FEMA) and the Iowa Homeland Security and Emergency Management, preliminary damage was estimated at $6 million, (Note: $6 million in 2008 is approximately $8,972,000 today.) including over $3 million (Note: $3 million in 2008 is approximately $4,486,000 today.) in Butler County. While the tornado was caught on tape and photographed by spotters, a surveillance camera inside a bank in Parkersburg also caught the tornado on tape as the storm passed over the building. Another surveillance camera showed the tornado ripping the roof off a house across a street before the video feed was lost. After the tornado, Governor Chet Culver declared Butler and Black Hawk counties disaster areas due to the extensive storm damage. On May 29, The Waterloo-Cedar Falls Courier reported that lightweight debris from the Waterloo area, including photographs, check stubs, greeting cards, and business records from a Waterloo Walgreens had been found in Prairie du Chien, Wisconsin, over 100 miles (160 km) away.

In Parkersburg, 288 of the city’s 830 houses were destroyed, with 100 more houses moderately-to-heavily damaged. 22 businesses were destroyed. The city hall, fire station, elementary school, and St. Patrick’s and Oak Hill cemeteries were destroyed. Aplington–Parkersburg High School was also destroyed. Walls towards the south side of the high school were completely destroyed, and the roof was ripped off. In 2009, the high school and athletic field was rebuilt for $19 million.

Immediately after the tornado hit Parkersburg, officials evacuated the city for four days so that emergency services could ensure safety for the community. In 2 weeks, more than 1,000 firefighters, emergency managers, emergency medical technicians and paramedics came to help, including people from bordering states. Since 2008, 265 houses have been built, with more than 90% of them having tornado safe rooms.

The tornado was the first F5 or EF5 tornado in Iowa since one hit Jordan on June 13, 1976 and the second deadliest in Iowa since official record-keeping began in 1950.

== See also ==
- Weather of 2008
- List of F5, EF5, and IF5 tornadoes
