= Chelsea Poppens =

American basketball player

Personal information
- Born: February 19, 1991 (age 35) Clinton, Maryland, U.S.
- Listed height: 6 ft 2 in (1.88 m)

Career information
- High school: Aplington–Parkersburg (Aplington, Iowa)
- College: Iowa State (2009–2013)
- WNBA draft: 2013: 2nd round, 18th overall pick
- Drafted by: Seattle Storm
- Playing career: 2013–present
- Position: Forward

Career history
- 2013: San Antonio Silver Stars
- 2013–2014: Melbourne Boomers
- 2014: AZS UMCS Lublin

Career highlights
- 2× First-team All-Big 12 (2012, 2013); Big 12 All-Defense team (2011)
- Stats at WNBA.com
- Stats at Basketball Reference

Chelsea Kathryn Poppens (born February 19, 1991) is an American professional basketball player who formerly played for the San Antonio Stars of the WNBA. She played college basketball at Iowa State University.

== College ==
Poppens is one of three players to achieve more than 1,000 points and 1,000 rebounds in Iowa State women's basketball.

== Iowa State statistics ==
Legend
GP	Games played	GS	Games started	MPG	Minutes per game
FG%	Field goal percentage	3P%	3-point field goal percentage	FT%	Free throw percentage
RPG	Rebounds per game	APG	Assists per game	SPG	Steals per game
BPG	Blocks per game	PPG	Points per game	**Bold**	Career high

Year	Team	GP	Points	FG%	3P%	FT%	RPG	APG	SPG	BPG	PPG
2009–10	Iowa State	**33**	291	48.9%	0.0%	62.7%	7.2	0.7	0.6	**0.4**	8.8
2010–11	Iowa State	**33**	276	**51.0%**	0.0%	65.4%	7.5	1.1	0.6	0.2	8.6
2011–12	Iowa State	30	**425**	49.8%	16.7%	71.3%	**10.6**	1.1	**1.2**	0.2	**14.2**
2012–13	Iowa State	30	401	50.4%	**30.4%**	**83.7%**	9.7	**1.8**	1.0	0.3	13.4
Career		126	1393	50.0%	23.5%	71.1%	8.7	1.1	0.8	0.3	11.1

== WNBA ==
Poppens was selected 18th by the Seattle Storm, but she was waived. She then went to the San Antonio Silver Stars.

== WNBA career statistics ==
Legend
GP	Games played	GS	Games started	MPG	Minutes per game	RPG	Rebounds per game
APG	Assists per game	SPG	Steals per game	BPG	Blocks per game	PPG	Points per game
TO	Turnovers per game	FG%	Field-goal percentage	3P%	3-point field-goal percentage	FT%	Free-throw percentage
**Bold**	Career best	°	League leader

=== Regular season ===
Year	Team	GP	GS	MPG	FG%	3P%	FT%	RPG	APG	SPG	BPG	TO	PPG
2013	San Antonio	8	0	7.9	44.4	0.0	25.0	2.1	0.1	0.1	0.0	0.3	1.1

== See also ==
- Iowa State Cyclones women's basketball
