= Jared DeVries =

American football player (born 1976)

No. 95
- Position: Defensive end

Personal information
- Born: June 11, 1976 (age 50); Aplington, Iowa, U.S.
- Listed height: 6 ft 4 in (1.93 m)
- Listed weight: 275 lb (125 kg)

Career information
- High school: Aplington–Parkersburg (Parkersburg, Iowa)
- College: Iowa
- NFL draft: 1999: 3rd round, 70th overall pick

Career history
- Detroit Lions (1999–2010)

Awards and highlights
- Consensus All-American (1998); Second-team All-American (1997); Big Ten Defensive Lineman of the Year (1997); 3× First-team All-Big Ten (1996–1998)

Career NFL statistics
- Games played: 120
- Total tackles: 199
- Sacks: 16.5
- Forced fumbles: 6
- Fumble recoveries: 7
- Stats at Pro Football Reference

Jared Jay DeVries /dɪˈvriːz/ (born June 11, 1976) is an American former professional football player who was a defensive end in the National Football League (NFL). He played college football for the Iowa Hawkeyes, and twice earned All-American honors. He was selected by the Detroit Lions in the third round of the 1999 NFL draft, and played his entire professional career there.

== Early life ==
DeVries was born in Aplington, Iowa. He attended Aplington–Parkersburg High School, where he was a Blue Chip Illustrated high school All-American and All-Midwest pick as a senior at defensive end in 1993, as well as a Class 1A all-state selection as a senior and junior. Over his 2 years at Aplington-Parkersburg, he recorded 26 QB sacks. He also played as a fullback and scored more than 60 touchdowns as well as over 4,000 rushing yards.

== College career ==
DeVries attended the University of Iowa, and played for the Hawkeyes from 1995 to 1998. He holds the Hawkeyes' team record for career quarterback sacks with 43 and tackles for loss with 79. As a freshman, he started every game in 1995, recording 54 tackles, 12 sacks and 19 tackles for loss and was named MVP of the 1995 Sun Bowl vs. Washington. As a sophomore in 1996, he was a Football News All-American third-team pick after recording 22 tying the school's single season record. As a junior in 1997 he was named an Associated Press and Football News All-American second-team selection as well as the team's Co-MVP after starting ever game at left defensive tackle. As a senior in 1998, he was an All-Big Ten first-team selection for the third straight season, and was recognized as a consensus first-team All-American.

== Professional career ==
DeVries was selected by the Detroit Lions in the third round (70th overall) of the 1999 NFL draft.

As a rookie DeVries played in just two games, due to a foot injury suffered during training camp. He made his NFL debut against the Washington Redskins on December 5, 1999. In 2000 season, he recorded 35 tackles. He earned his first career start against the New York Giants. In 2001, he started the season on the Physically Unable To Perform (PUP) list while recovering from a blood clot suffered during an offseason workout. In 2002, he recorded his first career sack on Daunte Culpepper for a loss of four yards. In 2003, he had a career best two starts and two forced fumbles. In 2004, DeVries was a member of the Lions' "wedge" on kick returns, helping block for kick returner Eddie Drummond, who finished the season ranked second in the NFL in kick returns. On the season DeVries had a career high three sacks. He also received the Ed Block Courage Award. In 2005, he again recorded three sacks. In 2006 he started a career best nine games, recording a career high 37 tackles. He recorded his first career safety after he touched down Patriots fullback Heath Evans in the endzone after Evans recovered a Tom Brady fumble. In 2007, he recorded a career high 6.5 sacks and three fumble recoveries and 54 tackles. In 2008, DeVries started nine games and recorded 45 tackles and two sacks. In 2009, he was placed on injured reserve before the start of the season with a torn Achilles tendon. After the season, on February 23, 2010, the Lions released him. However, he was re-signed on April 11.

== Personal life ==
DeVries and wife, Jamie, have two sons: Jaylen and Easton. In 2006, he helped purchase and shop for emergency relief supplies for Hurricane Katrina victims. He also donated Lions' home game tickets to the Children's Hospital of Michigan and Our Children's Homestead through the Lions CATS (Caring Athletes Ticket Service) for Kids program. Took part for fourth-straight year in the 2007 Lions Pet Calendar that helps to raise money for the Dearborn Animal Shelter. Jared was the Clear Lake Lions head football coach in Clear Lake, Iowa. His son, Jaylen, is currently a sophomore quarterback for the Southern Illinois University Salukis football team. His son Easton died on July 28, 2023, at the age of 19 years old.

Jared's older brother, Darian DeVries, is the head coach for the Indiana Hoosiers men's basketball team.
