= Brad Meester =

American football player (born 1977)

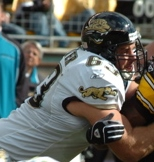
- Meester with the Jacksonville Jaguars in 2005

No. 63
- Position: Center

Personal information
- Born: March 23, 1977 (age 49); Iowa Falls, Iowa, U.S.
- Listed height: 6 ft 3 in (1.91 m)
- Listed weight: 292 lb (132 kg)

Career information
- High school: Aplington–Parkersburg (IA)
- College: Northern Iowa (1995–1999)
- NFL draft: 2000: 2nd round, 60th overall pick

Career history
- Jacksonville Jaguars (2000–2013)

Awards and highlights
- PFW/PFWA All-Rookie Team (2000); Division I-AA All-American (1999); 3× First-team All-GFC (1997–1999)

Career NFL statistics
- Games played: 209
- Games started: 209
- Stats at Pro Football Reference

Bradley Ryan Meester (born March 23, 1977) is an American former professional football player who was a center for the Jacksonville Jaguars of the National Football League (NFL). He played college football for the Northern Iowa Panthers and was selected by the Jaguars in the second round of the 2000 NFL draft.

== Early life ==
Meester attended Aplington–Parkersburg High School in Parkersburg, Iowa, and was a good student and a letterman in football, basketball, baseball, and track & field. He was the South Butler FFA Chapter President. Meester graduated from Aplington–Parkersburg in 1995 with a 3.80 grade point average.

== College career ==
At Northern Iowa, Meester was a four-year starter at center and a three-time All-Gateway Conference first-team selection. He was named to the Division I-AA Associated Press and Coaches All-America team as a senior. He also made the 1999 GTE Academic All-America team.

Along with his athletic accomplishments, Meester proved himself to be an outstanding student, graduating with a degree in business management with a 3.76 GPA.

== Professional career ==
=== 2000 NFL draft ===
Regarded as the No. 2 center available in the 2000 NFL draft behind John St. Clair, Meester was the first center chosen, selected with the 60th overall pick by the Jacksonville Jaguars. He tied with Michael Cheever (1996) as the highest-drafted centers ever by the team. Meester also was the highest Northern Iowa draftee since James Jones in 1991.

Pre-draft measurables
Height	Weight	40-yard dash	20-yard shuttle	Vertical jump	Broad jump	Bench press
6 ft 3 1/2 in (1.92 m)	295 lb (134 kg)	5.1 s	4.45 s	34 in (0.86 m)	9 ft 2 in (2.79 m)	25 reps
All values from NFL Combine

=== Jacksonville Jaguars ===
Meester was selected in the second round by the Jacksonville Jaguars where he started all 16 games in his rookie season. He was only the third rookie in Jaguars history to start all 16 games. In 2003, he moved from left guard to center following the departure of free agent John Wade. He is the only Jaguar to start his first 92 regular season games. His streak was ended on December 4, 2005, when he suffered a torn biceps tendon in a game against the Cleveland Browns.

An unrestricted free agent in the 2009 offseason, Meester was re-signed by the Jaguars on February 27.

Meester became a free agent on March 12, 2013, and was re-signed by the team on March 19.

On December 18, 2013, Meester announced that he would retire after the 2013 season after playing his entire career with the Jaguars. On December 22 in a game against the Tennessee Titans, Meester recorded his first career reception on a screen pass from Chad Henne for nine yards and a first down.

Meester retired as the Jaguar franchise record holder for seasons played (14), games played (209), games started (209) and consecutive games started (92).

== Family ==
Meester and his wife, Jamie, have six daughters and live in Iowa. His daughter Chloe plays volleyball for the Louisville Cardinals. He enjoys riding and restoring motorcycles, deer hunting and gator hunting.
