= Cycloidal marks =

Debris piles made by powerful tornadoes

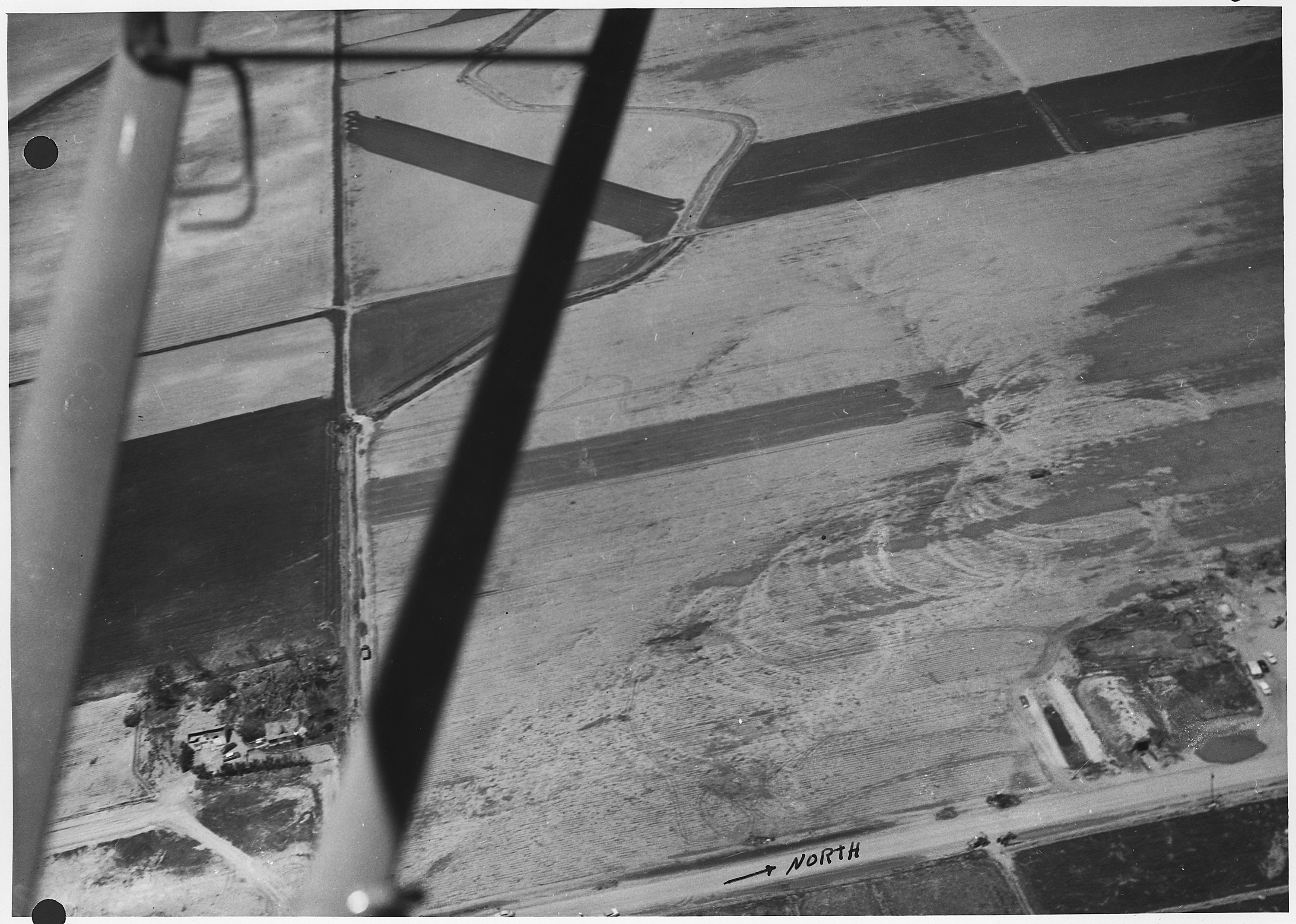
Circular cycloidal marks observed following an F4 tornado near Scottsbluff, Nebraska in 1955

Cycloidal marks, also known as cycloidal damage swaths, are lineo-circular piles of debris that are produced by some powerful multiple-vortex tornadoes. Cycloidal marks are typically an indication that a tornado possessed suction vortices. Notable tornadoes that have produced cycloidal marks include the 2008 Parkersburg–New Hartford tornado, 2016 Dodge City tornadoes and the 2022 Nullarbor Plain tornado. Cycloidal marks created by dust devils have been documented on Mars by the Mars Global Surveyor.

== See also ==
- Tornado intensity
- Tornado damage survey
