= Darian DeVries =

American basketball player and coach (born 1975)

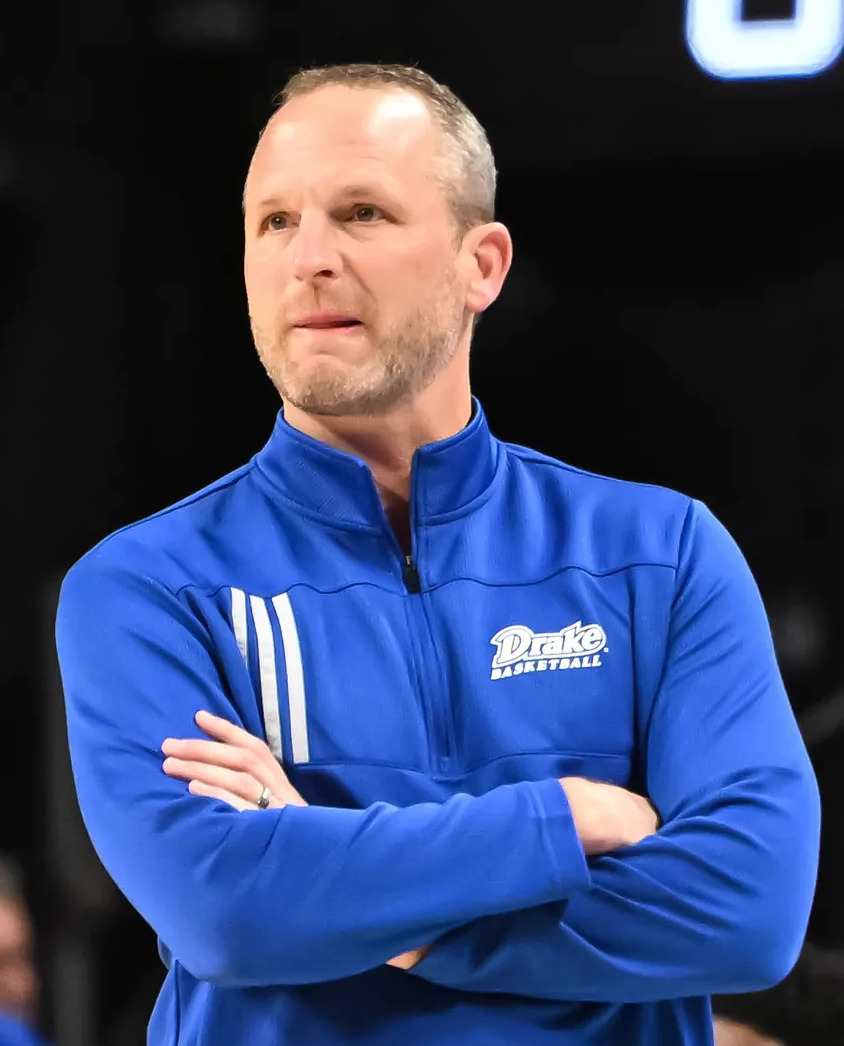
- DeVries with Drake in 2023

Current position
- Title: Head coach
- Team: Indiana
- Conference: Big Ten
- Record: 24–14 (.632)

Biographical details
- Born: April 7, 1975 (age 51); Aplington, Iowa, U.S.

Playing career
- 1994–1998: Northern Iowa

Coaching career (HC unless noted)
- 2001–2018: Creighton (assistant)
- 2018–2024: Drake
- 2024–2025: West Virginia
- 2025–present: Indiana

Head coaching record
- Overall: 193–82 (.702)
- Tournaments: 1–3 (NCAA Division I); 1–1 (CBI); 0–1 (CIT)

Accomplishments and honors

Championships
- 2 MVC tournament (2023, 2024); MVC regular season (2019)

Awards
- Hugh Durham Award (2019); 2× MVC Coach of the Year (2019, 2021)

Darian Dale DeVries (born April 7, 1975) is an American basketball coach who is currently the head men's basketball coach at Indiana. He was previously the head coach at Drake University from 2018 to 2024 and at West Virginia during the 2024–25 season.

== Early life ==
DeVries was born and raised in Aplington, Iowa. The oldest of five siblings, he played basketball and football at Aplington High School for three years before graduating from the merged Aplington-Parkersburg High School in 1993.

== Coaching history ==
=== Early career ===
DeVries played collegiately at Northern Iowa. After graduating, he joined Creighton University as a graduate manager in its men's basketball program. After three seasons as a graduate manager, DeVries was named assistant coach in 2001. He stayed with Creighton following the departure of Dana Altman and the hire of Greg McDermott.

=== Drake University ===
DeVries became a head coach for the first time when he accepted the job at former conference rival Drake in March 2018.

DeVries' helped the Bulldogs program start the season with 9–2 record, the program's best open to a season since 2007–08. The Bulldogs' win over Valparaiso Feb 16 was the team's 20th win of the season to mark the sixth 20-win season in program history. This accomplishment came after inheriting the second-fewest returning letterwinners in the nation.

Following that start, starting point guard and potential MVC Larry Bird Player of the Year candidate Nick Norton suffered a season-ending knee injury in the first game of the MVC season. DeVries' team proceeded to win four of its next five games to move into a tie for third place in the league standings. At the close of the 2018–19 season, he was named MVC Coach of the Year.

In his next season, DeVries made history as the first coach to lead an 8-seed to a win over the 1-seed in the Missouri Valley Conference Tournament ("Arch Madness"), defeating UNI 77–56.

DeVries' success at Drake continued in the 2020–21 season where he took the team to a 18–0 start which included the Bulldogs' inclusion in the AP Top 25 poll. After losing two of their top players to injury, DeVries' led Drake to their first at-large NCAA Tournament bid in years, and their first NCAA tournament win in 50 years to the day with a win over former Valley foe Wichita State. DeVries was also named MVC Coach of the Year for the second time in three years. In March 2021, DeVries signed an 8-year contract extension with Drake, keeping him in Des Moines through the 2028–29 season.

DeVries achieved his 100th win on November 21, 2022, at the US Virgin Islands Paradise Jam against Tarleton State.

=== West Virginia ===
On March 24, 2024, West Virginia hired DeVries as its next head basketball coach, replacing interim coach Josh Eilert. DeVries was hired for $2.8 million, with a $100,000 increase each year. In his first and only year as the Mountaineers' head coach, DeVries led the team to a 19-13 record with a 10-10 record in Big 12 play. DeVries' son Tucker underwent surgery for an upper-body injury and played in only eight games. West Virginia was excluded from the 2025 NCAA Division I men's basketball tournament, with West Virginia governor Patrick Morrisey holding a press conference asking for an investigation into the selection process and stating "this was a miscarriage of justice and robbery at the highest levels."

=== Indiana ===
On March 18, 2025, DeVries was hired as the head coach of the Indiana Hoosiers after spending one year at West Virginia. The deal was reported to be for six years, with DeVries being paid nearly $5 million each season. In his introductory press conference, DeVries stated that he intended to stay with West Virginia and build on his first season, but that "the opportunity came along to possibly be the head coach at Indiana - a dream job for anyone - but especially for someone that grew up in the Midwest. The chance to lead one of the biggest brands in college basketball was something I could not pass up."

== Personal life ==
DeVries is the older brother of former University of Iowa All-American and NFL defensive end Jared DeVries. The older of his two children, Tucker, played for him at Drake, West Virginia, and Indiana, and was named MVC Player of the Year in 2023 and 2024.

== Head coaching record ==
Record table
Season	Team	Overall	Conference	Standing	Postseason
Drake Bulldogs (Missouri Valley Conference) (2018–2024)
2018–19	Drake	24–10	12–6	T–1st	CIT First Round
2019–20	Drake	20–14	8–10	8th	Postseason canceled
2020–21	Drake	26–5	15–3	2nd	NCAA Division I Round of 64
2021–22	Drake	25–11	13–5	T–2nd	CBI Quarterfinals
2022–23	Drake	27–8	15–5	2nd	NCAA Division I Round of 64
2023–24	Drake	28–7	16–4	2nd	NCAA Division I Round of 64
Drake:		150–55 (.732)	79–33 (.705)		
West Virginia Mountaineers (Big 12 Conference) (2024–2025)
2024–25	West Virginia	19–13	10–10	T–7th	
West Virginia:		19–13 (.594)	10–10 (.500)		
Indiana Hoosiers (Big Ten Conference) (2025–present)
2025–26	Indiana	18–14	9–11	10th	
2026–27	Indiana	6–0	0–0		
Indiana:		24–14 (.632)	9–11 (.450)		
Total:		193–82 (.702)			
National champion Postseason invitational champion Conference regular season champion Conference regular season and conference tournament champion Division regular season champion Division regular season and conference tournament champion Conference tournament champion
