= Aplington–Parkersburg Community School District =

School district in Parkersburg, Iowa

Coordinates: 42.573020°N 92.779665°W

Location
- Parkersburg, Iowa Butler and Grundy counties United States
- Coordinates: 42.573020, -92.779665

District information
- Type: Local school district
- Motto: “Committed To Promoting Life Long Intellectual and Personal Growth"
- Grades: PK–12
- Established: 2004
- Superintendent: Travis Fleshner
- Schools: 3
- Budget: $12,437,000 (2020-21)
- NCES District ID: 1903750

Students and staff
- Students: 876 (2022-23)
- Teachers: 64.03 FTE
- Staff: 67.89 FTE
- Student–teacher ratio: 13.68
- Athletic conference: North Iowa Cedar League

Other information
- Website: www.a-pcsd.net

Aplington–Parkersburg Community School District is a rural public school district in Parkersburg, Iowa. Occupying portions of Butler and Grundy counties, it serves the towns of Aplington and Parkersburg.

== History ==
The district formed on July 1, 2004, with the merger of the Aplington Community School District and the Parkersburg Community School District. The predecessor districts had started sharing grades and activities in 1992. Enrollment declines contributed to the grade-sharing and the merger; the two districts together had 947 students in 1992 and 886 students in 2001; in 2003 the enrollment projection for 2006 was 762 students. The State of Iowa had already paid money to the pre-merger districts in exchange for having their grade-sharing, and it promised $500,000 for a successful merger.

Rob Hughes was scheduled to begin his role as superintendent of both A-P CSD and of Grundy Center Community School District effective July 1, 2019. He resigned in March 2021, becoming a full-time superintendent at Grundy Center.

Travis Fleshner was hired as superintendent in June 2022.

== Schools ==
- Aplington Elementary School - Aplington
- Parkersburg Elementary School - Parkersburg
- Aplington–Parkersburg Middle School - Aplington
- Aplington–Parkersburg High School - Parkersburg

== See also ==
- List of school districts in Iowa
