= Aplington–Parkersburg High School =

Public secondary school in Parkersburg, Iowa, United States

Location
- 610 N Johnson St; Parkersburg, Iowa 50665; United States; 42.573°N 92.779°W

Information
- Type: Public Secondary
- Motto: "Committed To Promoting Life Long Intellectual and Personal Growth"
- Established: 1993
- School district: Aplington–Parkersburg Community School District
- NCES District ID: 1903750
- Superintendent: Travis Fleshner
- NCES School ID: 190375001337
- Principal: Aaron Thomas
- Teaching staff: 17.95 (FTE)
- Grades: 9–12
- Enrollment: 261 (2023-2024)
- Student to teacher ratio: 14.54
- Campus: Rural
- Colors: Red, Black and Silver
- Athletics conference: North Iowa Cedar League
- Mascot: Falcons
- Rival: Dike-New Hartford High School
- Newspaper: Parkersburg Eclipse News-Review
- Website: aphs.a-pcsd.net

Aplington–Parkersburg High School is a rural public high school in Parkersburg, Iowa, United States. It is a part of the Aplington–Parkersburg Community School District.

== History ==
It was formed in 1992, from the merger of the high schools of the Aplington and Parkersburg school districts. The Parkersburg district maintained the joint high school. The two districts legally merged into a single district on July 1, 2004.

On May 25, 2008, the school was destroyed by an EF5 tornado. It has since been rebuilt, with the new building being available for the start of the 2009-2010 school year.

== Athletics ==
The athletic extracurricular activities at Aplington–Parkersburg High School are football, volleyball, cross country, basketball, wrestling, tennis, soccer, golf, track and field, softball and baseball. The Falcons are classified as a 2A school and compete in North Iowa Cedar League Conference.

Throughout its history, Aplington–Parkersburg has won several state championships in various sports and were state runner-up numerous times. In addition, several graduates have gone on to participate in Division I, Division II, and Division III athletics.

Prior to the 1992 merger, the separate high schools in Aplington and Parkersburg were members of the Big Marsh Conference until the 1976–77 school year, when both schools left to join the Mid Iowa Conference, then the Big Iowa Conference.

=== Ed Thomas ===
On June 24, 2009, Ed Thomas, the football coach, track coach, and athletic director, was shot and killed in the weight room. He was featured on the July 6th, 2009, cover of Sports Illustrated.

On July 14, 2010, The family of Ed Thomas was awarded the Arthur Ashe Courage Award at the 2010 ESPN ESPYs.

=== State championships ===
State championships
Season	Sport	Number of championships	Year
Fall	Football	2	1993, 2001 (Class 1A)
Fall	Volleyball	1	2005
Spring	Golf, Boys'	1	1994
Spring	Track and Field (wheelchair division)	3	2005, 2006, 2007
Spring	Track and Field, Girls'	1	2001
Total		8	

== Notable alumni ==
- Darian DeVries, head men's basketball coach, Indiana University
- Jared DeVries, retired NFL player for the Detroit Lions
- Aaron Kampman, retired NFL player who played mainly for the Green Bay Packers
- Brad Meester, retired NFL player for the Jacksonville Jaguars
- Chelsea Poppens, professional basketball player who formerly played for the San Antonio Stars of the WNBA.
- Casey Wiegmann, retired NFL player who played mainly for the Chicago Bears and Kansas City Chiefs

== See also ==
- List of high schools in Iowa
