= New Hartford, Iowa =

- City
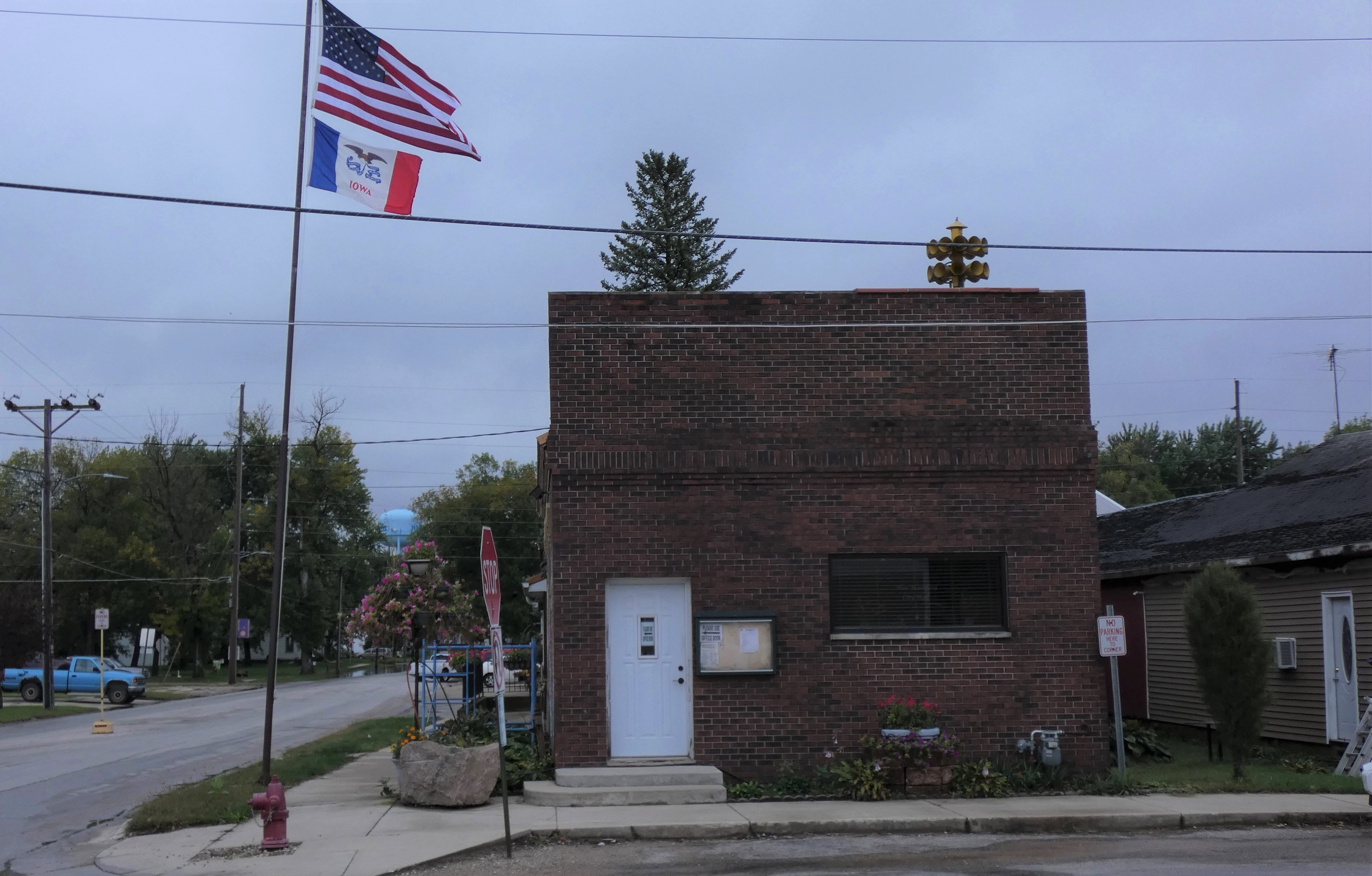
- New Hartford Town Hall

- Location of New Hartford, Iowa
- Coordinates: 42°34′03″N 92°37′28″W
- Country: US
- State: Iowa
- County: Butler

Area
  - Total: 0.62 sq mi (1.61 km^{2})
  - Land: 0.62 sq mi (1.61 km^{2})
  - Water: 0 sq mi (0.00 km^{2})
- Elevation: 896 ft (273 m)

Population (2020)
  - Total: 570
  - Density: 919.1/sq mi (354.87/km^{2})
- Time zone: UTC-6 (Central (CST))
  - Summer (DST): UTC-5 (CDT)
- ZIP code: 50660
- Area code: 319
- FIPS code: 19-56145
- GNIS feature ID: 2395198
- Website: www.newhartfordia.org

New Hartford is a city in Butler County, Iowa, United States. The population was 570 at the time of the 2020 census.

== Geography ==
According to the United States Census Bureau, the city has a total area of 0.50 square miles (1.29 km^{2}), all land.

== Demographics ==
Historical Populations
Year	Pop.	±%
1900	570	—
1910	482	−15.4%
1920	454	−5.8%
1930	500	+10.1%
1940	548	+9.6%
1950	584	+6.6%
1960	649	+11.1%
1970	690	+6.3%
1980	764	+10.7%
1990	683	−10.6%
2000	659	−3.5%
2010	516	−21.7%
2020	570	+10.5%
Source:"U.S. Census website". United States Census Bureau. and Iowa Data Center; Source: U.S. Decennial Census

=== 2020 census ===
At the 2020 census, there were 570 people, 278 households and 210 families living in the city. The population density was 918.89 inhabitants per square mile (354.8/km^{2}). There were 293 housing units at an average density of 472.34 per square mile (182.4/km^{2}). The racial makeup of the city was 95.6% White, 0.0% Native American, 0.0% Asian, 0.7% from other races, and 3.7% from two or more races. Hispanic or Latino of any race were 1.1% of the population.

There were 278 households, of which 32.4% had children under the age of 18 living with them, 68.0% were married couples living together, 1.8% had a female householder with no husband present, 5.8% had a male householder with no wife present, and 24.5% were non-families. 23.7% of all households were made up of individuals, and 10.4% had someone living alone who was 65 years of age or older. The average household size was 2.84 and the average family size was 3.33.

The median age was 35.6 years. 46.7% of residents were under the age of 18; 7.7% were between the ages of 18 and 24; 35.3% were from 25 to 44; 26.7% were from 45 to 64; and 22.1% were 65 years of age or older.

=== 2010 census ===
At the 2010 census, there were 516 people, 215 households and 147 families living in the city. The population density was 1,032.0 inhabitants per square mile (398.5/km^{2}). There were 234 housing units at an average density of 468.0 per square mile (180.7/km^{2}). The racial makeup of the city was 98.1% White, 0.4% Native American, 0.2% Asian, 0.4% from other races, and 1.0% from two or more races. Hispanic or Latino of any race were 1.6% of the population.

There were 215 households, of which 30.7% had children under the age of 18 living with them, 53.5% were married couples living together, 10.7% had a female householder with no husband present, 4.2% had a male householder with no wife present, and 31.6% were non-families. 26.5% of all households were made up of individuals, and 9.8% had someone living alone who was 65 years of age or older. The average household size was 2.40 and the average family size was 2.83.

The median age was 38.3 years. 25% of residents were under the age of 18; 5.7% were between the ages of 18 and 24; 27.8% were from 25 to 44; 28.6% were from 45 to 64; and 13% were 65 years of age or older. The population was 51.0% male and 49.0% female.

=== 2000 census ===
At the 2000 census, there were 659 people, 270 households and 196 families living in the city. The population density was 1,303.9 inhabitants per square mile (503.4/km^{2}). There were 275 housing units at an average density of 544.1 per square mile (210.1/km^{2}). The racial makeup of the city was 98.63% White, 0.15% Native American, 0.15% Asian, 0.15% from other races, and 0.91% from two or more races. Hispanic or Latino of any race were 1.06% of the population.

There were 270 households, of which 30.7% had children under the age of 18 living with them, 58.5% were married couples living together, 8.5% had a female householder with no husband present, and 27.4% were non-families. 22.6% of all households were made up of individuals, and 10.7% had someone living alone who was 65 years of age or older. The average household size was 2.44 and the average family size was 2.87.

23.5% of the population were under the age of 18, 9.0% from 18 to 24, 26.3% from 25 to 44, 27.6% from 45 to 64, and 13.7% who were 65 years of age or older. The median age was 38 years. For every 100 females, there were 92.7 males. For every 100 females age 18 and over, there were 94.6 males.

The median household income was $34,750 and the median family income was $38,816. Males had a median income of $30,909 and females $19,485. The per capita income was $16,771. About 8.2% of families and 9.0% of the population were below the poverty line, including 17.1% of those under age 18 and none of those age 65 or over.

The library in New Hartford after a day of periodic rain

== Education ==
Dike–New Hartford Community School District is the local school district. It was established on July 1, 1996, by the merger of the Dike and New Hartford school districts.

== 2008 tornado and flood ==
New Hartford was struck by a confirmed EF5 tornado on May 25, 2008. Two people were killed as well as seven people in nearby Parkersburg. This is the second confirmed EF5 tornado since the Enhanced Fujita scale was introduced, the other occurring in Greensburg, Kansas, on May 4, 2007. The town was prone to flooding until a levee was built around the town, which was raised and reinforced in 2009. In June 2008, only one week after being struck by a record EF5 tornado, the town experienced record flooding that forced all residents to evacuate. The flood damaged many homes and buildings in the town then incited relief efforts from FEMA and the American Red Cross. The Red Cross provided food assistance in the town, distributing grocery items at the town's community building and fire station, as well as providing meals out of a food truck. Some affected residents temporarily lived in FEMA trailers. Many residents made efforts to repair their homes, while others relocated outside of the town.

== Notable people ==
- Chuck Grassley (born 1933), U.S. senator for Iowa
