= Aplington, Iowa =

City in Iowa, US

- City
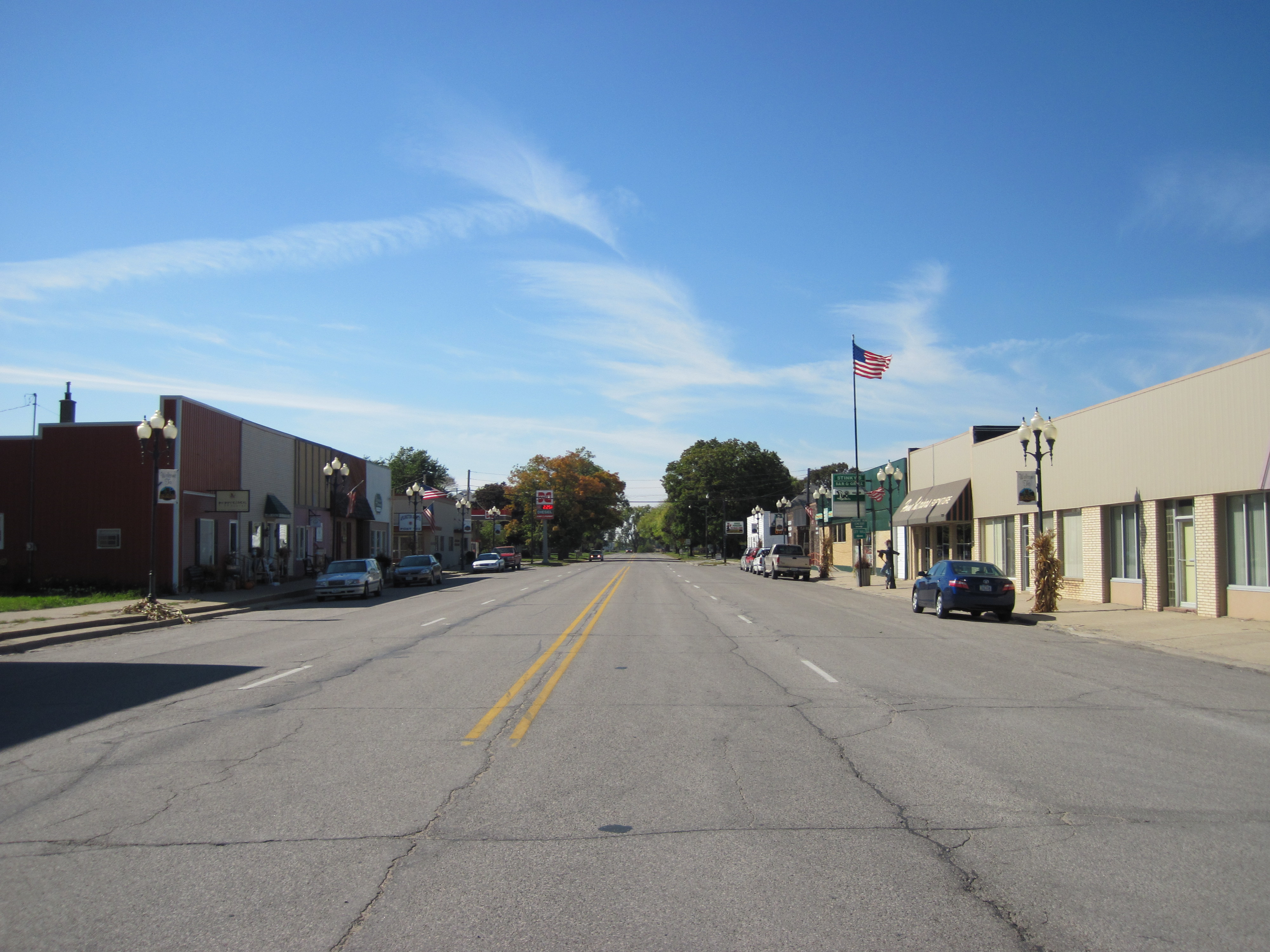
- Street scene in Aplington

- Location of Aplington, Iowa
- Coordinates: 42°34′54″N 92°52′40″W
- Country: United States
- State: Iowa
- County: Butler

Area
  - Total: 0.73 sq mi (1.90 km^{2})
  - Land: 0.73 sq mi (1.90 km^{2})
  - Water: 0 sq mi (0.00 km^{2})
- Elevation: 978 ft (298 m)

Population (2020)
  - Total: 1,116
  - Density: 1,519.1/sq mi (586.53/km^{2})
- Time zone: UTC-6 (Central (CST))
  - Summer (DST): UTC-5 (CDT)
- ZIP code: 50604
- Area code: 319
- FIPS code: 19-02395
- GNIS feature ID: 2393966
- Website: www.aplingtonia.com

Aplington is a city in Butler County, Iowa, United States. The population was 1,116 at the 2020 census.

== History ==
In the summer of 1857, the village of Aplington was laid out and platted by the proprietors, Thomas Nash, R. R. Parriott, Zenas Aplington and Theodore A. Wilson on Sec. 29 (of Monroe Township). At the time one house stood on the tract of land, which had been erected and occupied by Charles Savage, a New Englander, a settler of short duration. The town was named by its promoters in honor of one of their number, Zenas Aplington, a resident of Illinois, who never lived here. He owned part of the land, however, and took a lively interest in the town's welfare until his death, which occurred while serving his country in the American Civil War.

The first building erected in Aplington was built by Zenas Aplington in 1856. He also furnish a stock of general merchandise. The building stood on the south side of Parriott Street, and the first Aplington merchant, George W. Hunter, sold goods over the counters here about one year for Mr. Aplington. He was succeeded by Chester Stilson, who ran the store for eighteen months; then it closed its doors. However, in 1864, Isaac Hall opened a general store in this building. He sold his stock to C. S. Price, who a year later closed out at auction.

The father of Charles Savage was an early settler in this part of the county and set up a blacksmith forge in a roofless sod house. This was the first smithy in the southern part of Butler County. William Bisbee came here in 1857 and opened a blacksmith shop for Zenas Aplington and managed it one year that enterprising non-resident. He then engaged in the trade for himself and continued therein for many years.

Mrs. Rachel Quinn built and presided over the first hotel in 1858. E. Y. Royer bought the property in 1866 and sold it to Edward Bourns in 1867, who continued the hotel a few years. The building was then purchased by Henry Kers and used as a residence. The present hotel is an old frame structure showing the wear and tear of the elements. Yet the traveler is well taken care of and give a good, generous meal by the proprietor.

The first grain elevator in Aplington was built by Alonzo McKey, at the time of the coming of the Illinois Central Railroad in 1865. Among the several managers was C. M. Mead. The next was built by the firm of Wright Brothers and run by the firm until 1877. Several persons have been in charge of the business since then. The third elevator was built by S. L. Kemmerer in 1872. He sold the property to A. M. Whaley in 1876. In 1879, a fourth elevator was built. The firm of Chrystie & Prince, proprietors, disposed of their interests to Mr. Willis.

Aplington was early noted for its mills and creamery. Edward Hiller would have built a mill in the 1860s, but being unable to secure on reasonable terms, the right of way for a tail race, he gave up the project. However, John Matthews & Son, of Jackson county formed a stock company, with a capital of $14,000, in 1872. A mill was built, but before its completion certain of the stockholders refused to meet their obligations on stock issued them, which retarded the industry for a while. The Matthews finally turned over their interest to William Dobbins and the latter disposed of a controlling amount of the stock to A. L. Morris & Son, who had the mill running in September 1877. After this the mill had several owners.

Spring Hill Creamery began operations in the spring of 1881, on section 20. The proprietors at that time, Markley & Dodswell gave employment to a number of men and consumed vast quantities of milk which were delivered from the surrounding farms. One of the largest and most lucrative industries of this section of the county is dairying.

== Geography ==
According to the United States Census Bureau, the city has a total area of 0.83 square miles (2.15 km^{2}), all land.

== Demographics ==
Historical populations
Year	Pop.	±%
1890	427	—
1900	427	+0.0%
1910	448	+4.9%
1920	598	+33.5%
1930	622	+4.0%
1940	588	−5.5%
1950	702	+19.4%
1960	840	+19.7%
1970	936	+11.4%
1980	1,027	+9.7%
1990	1,034	+0.7%
2000	1,054	+1.9%
2010	1,128	+7.0%
2020	1,116	−1.1%
Source:"U.S. Census website". United States Census Bureau. and Iowa Data Center; Source: U.S. Decennial Census

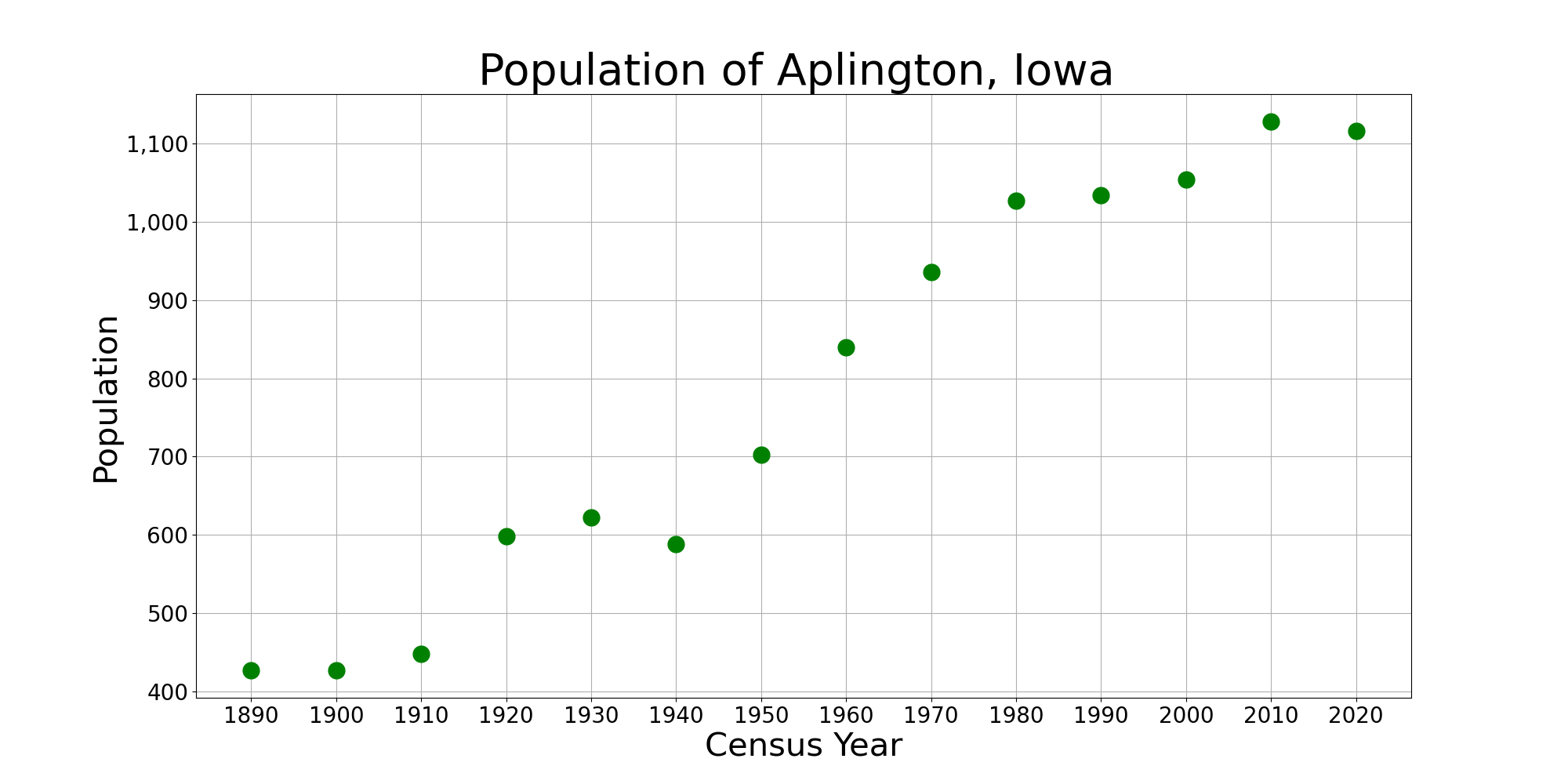
The population of Aplington, Iowa from US census data

=== 2020 census ===
As of the 2020 census, there were 1,116 people, 441 households, and 300 families residing in the city. The population density was 1,519.1 inhabitants per square mile (586.5/km^{2}). There were 504 housing units at an average density of 686.0 per square mile (264.9/km^{2}).

The median age in the city was 41.3 years. 24.1% of residents were under the age of 18 and 23.9% were 65 years of age or older. 26.2% of residents were under the age of 20; 4.1% were between the ages of 20 and 24; 23.5% were from 25 to 44; and 22.3% were from 45 to 64. The gender makeup of the city was 47.8% male and 52.2% female. For every 100 females, there were 91.4 males, and for every 100 females age 18 and over there were 87.8 males age 18 and over.

Of the 441 households, 30.6% had children under the age of 18 living with them, 54.4% were married-couple households, 7.7% were cohabitating-couple households, 13.6% had a male householder with no spouse or partner present, and 24.3% had a female householder with no spouse or partner present. 32.0% of all households were non-families. 28.8% of all households were made up of individuals, and 14.7% had someone living alone who was 65 years old or older.

Of the 504 housing units, 12.5% were vacant. The homeowner vacancy rate was 2.2% and the rental vacancy rate was 13.3%. 0.0% of residents lived in urban areas, while 100.0% lived in rural areas.

Racial composition as of the 2020 census
Race	Number	Percent
White	1,081	96.9%
Black or African American	5	0.4%
American Indian and Alaska Native	3	0.3%
Asian	1	0.1%
Native Hawaiian and Other Pacific Islander	0	0.0%
Some other race	2	0.2%
Two or more races	24	2.2%
Hispanic or Latino (of any race)	10	0.9%

=== 2010 census ===
As of the census of 2010, there were 1,128 people, 461 households, and 308 families residing in the city. The population density was 1,359.0 inhabitants per square mile (524.7/km^{2}). There were 505 housing units at an average density of 608.4 per square mile (234.9/km^{2}). The racial makeup of the city was 99.2% White, 0.1% African American, 0.2% Asian, 0.1% from other races, and 0.4% from two or more races. Hispanic or Latino of any race were 0.3% of the population.

There were 461 households, of which 31.7% had children under the age of 18 living with them, 55.1% were married couples living together, 8.2% had a female householder with no husband present, 3.5% had a male householder with no wife present, and 33.2% were non-families. 29.7% of all households were made up of individuals, and 20.6% had someone living alone who was 65 years of age or older. The average household size was 2.36 and the average family size was 2.91.

The median age in the city was 43.3 years. 25.4% of residents were under the age of 18; 5.7% were between the ages of 18 and 24; 21.7% were from 25 to 44; 21.1% were from 45 to 64; and 26.2% were 65 years of age or older. The gender makeup of the city was 46.0% male and 54.0% female.

=== 2000 census ===
As of the census of 2000, there were 1,054 people, 439 households, and 302 families residing in the city. The population density was 1,818.0 inhabitants per square mile (701.9/km^{2}). There were 470 housing units at an average density of 810.7 per square mile (313.0/km^{2}). The racial makeup of the city was 99.53% White, 0.09% Asian, and 0.38% from two or more races. Hispanic or Latino of any race were 0.19% of the population.

There were 439 households, out of which 27.3% had children under the age of 18 living with them, 58.8% were married couples living together, 7.3% had a female householder with no husband present, and 31.2% were non-families. 30.1% of all households were made up of individuals, and 19.4% had someone living alone who was 65 years of age or older. The average household size was 2.28 and the average family size was 2.80.

In the city, the population was spread out, with 22.6% under the age of 18, 4.6% from 18 to 24, 23.1% from 25 to 44, 19.2% from 45 to 64, and 30.6% who were 65 years of age or older. The median age was 45 years. For every 100 females, there were 85.2 males. For every 100 females age 18 and over, there were 81.3 males.

The median income for a household in the city was $32,440, and the median income for a family was $41,711. Males had a median income of $31,354 versus $20,000 for females. The per capita income for the city was $17,527. About 6.8% of families and 8.9% of the population were below the poverty line, including 15.7% of those under age 18 and 2.9% of those age 65 or over.

== Education ==
Aplington's primary and secondary education needs are served by the Aplington–Parkersburg Community School District. The Aplington Elementary/Middle School is located at 215 10th St in Aplington. The Aplington–Parkersburg High School is located at 610 N. Johnson Street in Parkersburg. The district formed on July 1, 2004, after the Aplington Community School District merged with the Parkersburg Community School District.

== Notable people ==
- Betty Lee Babcock — politician, businesswoman, and wife of Governor of Montana, Tim M. Babcock
- Jared DeVries — former NFL player for the Detroit Lions
- Darian DeVries — head men's basketball coach for the Indiana Hoosiers
