= Parkersburg, Iowa =

- City
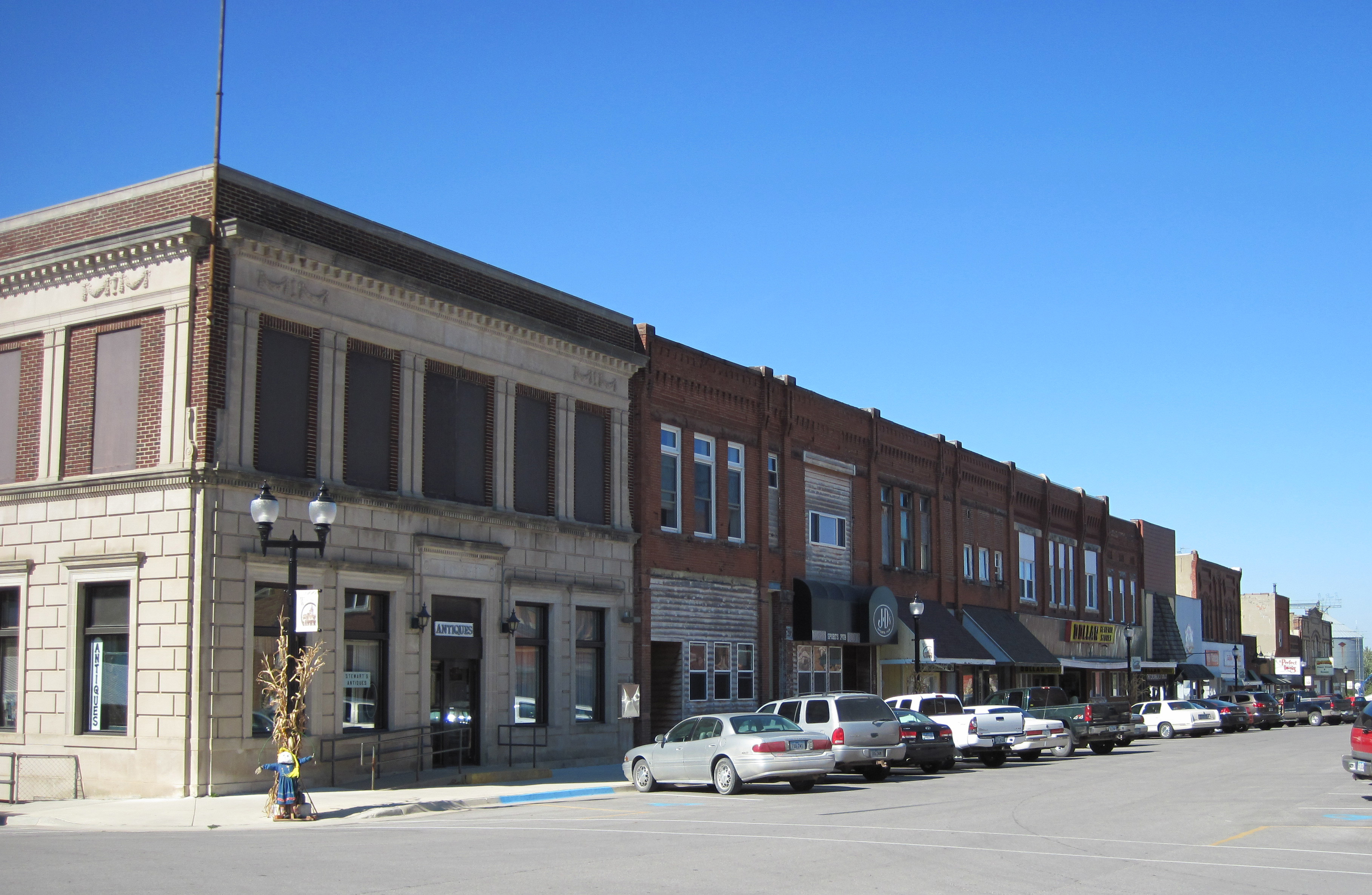
- Downtown Parkersburg

- Location of Parkersburg, Iowa
- Coordinates: 42°34′26″N 92°46′43″W
- Country: US
- State: Iowa
- County: Butler
- Incorporated: December 7, 1874

Area
  - Total: 1.44 sq mi (3.74 km^{2})
  - Land: 1.44 sq mi (3.74 km^{2})
  - Water: 0 sq mi (0.00 km^{2})
- Elevation: 978 ft (298 m)

Population (2020)
  - Total: 2,015
  - Density: 1,396.5/sq mi (539.21/km^{2})
- Time zone: UTC-6 (Central (CST))
  - Summer (DST): UTC-5 (CDT)
- ZIP code: 50665
- Area code: 319
- FIPS code: 19-61590
- GNIS feature ID: 2396152
- Website: www.parkersburgia.com

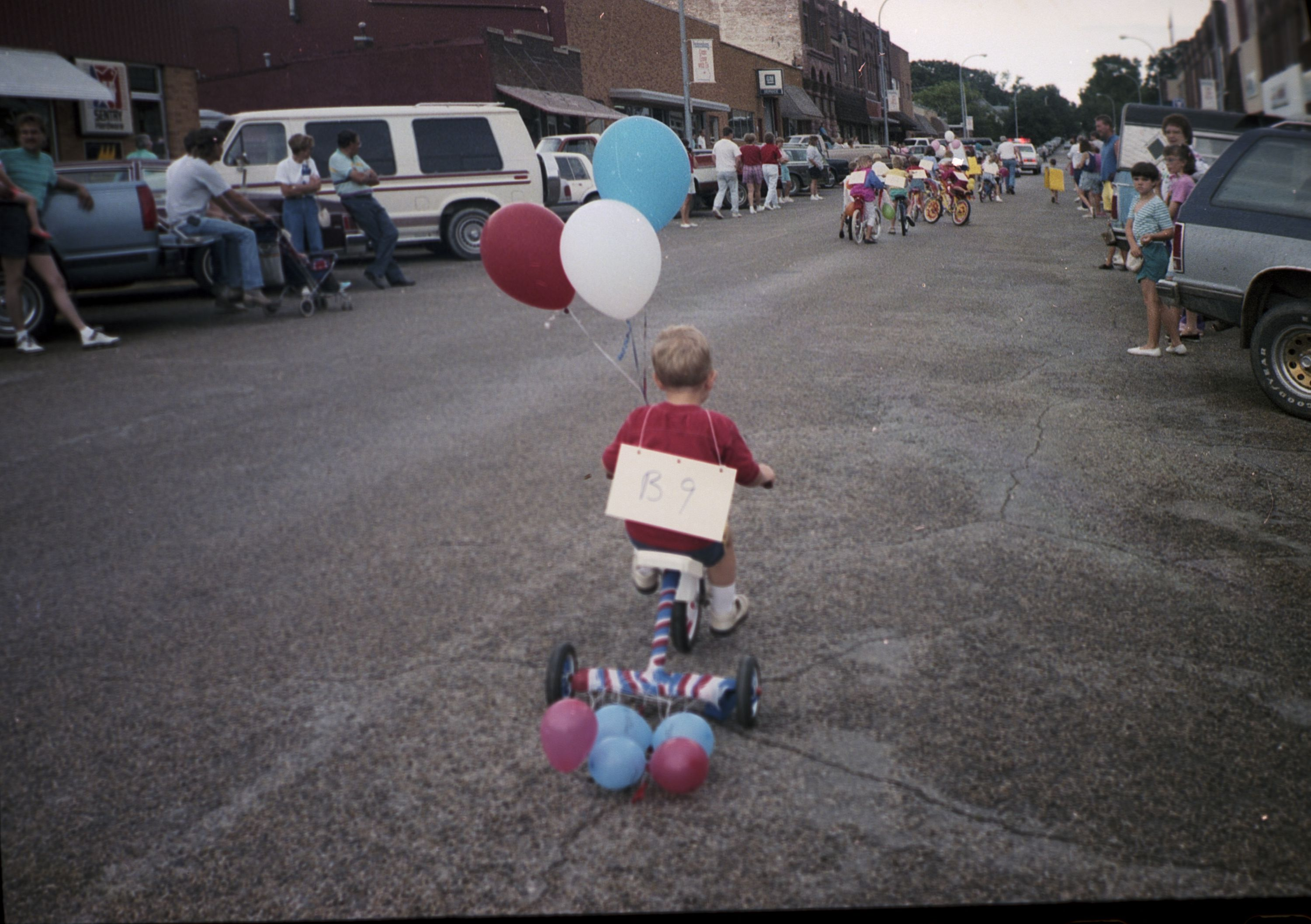
Main Street, Parkersburg, Iowa, 1991

Parkersburg is a city in Butler County, Iowa, United States. The population was 2,015 in the 2020 census, an increase from 1,870 in the 2010 census. Although not the county seat, Parkersburg is the most populous city in Butler County.

== History ==
The first known settlers of the Parkersburg area were John Connell and his son William, who built a log cabin in 1857. A railroad company surveyed the area in the early 1860s. A depot was erected in 1865 and two railroads, the Illinois Central and the Chicago North Western, were built through the town. The town was soon platted and recorded and given the name of "Parkersburg" in honor of Pascal P. Parker, a prominent settler and the town's first postmaster. The first major business was a hotel built by Thomas Williams, called The Williams House. Later, it became known as the Commercial House. Parkersburg was incorporated on December 7, 1874.

The first "School House" was built in the 1860s. Parkersburg became an independent school district in the spring of 1871. A new school was built in 1872. This building burned beyond repair on October 9, 1893, in the "great fire of Parkersburg", which also destroyed most of the business district. In 1894 a modern, three-story, brick structure was built. In 1930, the school added an auditorium and gymnasium.

The first electric power was furnished by the Parkersburg Electric Light & Power Company, composed of local citizens who built the plant in 1898 at a cost of $10,000. Parkersburg's roads were paved circa 1920. The first water tower only had a capacity of 40,000 gallons.

=== 2008 tornado ===
Seven people died in Parkersburg and two in rural New Hartford from injuries sustained when a confirmed EF5 tornado struck the region on May 25, 2008. At least 70 individuals were injured and transported to nearby hospitals. The south side of Parkersburg was completely destroyed and turned into rubble. Over 400 homes were destroyed or damaged, the roof was taken off the high school and destroyed, and the elementary school was damaged as well. The surviving residents were evacuated while the rescue operation was in progress. Today, Parkersburg is considered to be a model of disaster recovery and resiliency in the aftermath of a natural disaster.

The local water utility called the Iowa Rural Water Association for assistance after the city went on a boiled water notice. Utility infrastructure was left largely intact, but the tornado and clean-up efforts damaged the connections in numerous homes.

== Geography ==
According to the United States Census Bureau, the city has a total area of 1.42 square miles (3.68 km^{2}), all land.

== Demographics ==
Historical population
| Census | Pop. | Note | %± |
|---|---|---|---|
| 1880 | 652 | | — |
| 1890 | 760 | | 16.6% |
| 1900 | 1,164 | | 53.2% |
| 1910 | 938 | | −19.4% |
| 1920 | 1,108 | | 18.1% |
| 1930 | 1,046 | | −5.6% |
| 1940 | 1,260 | | 20.5% |
| 1950 | 1,300 | | 3.2% |
| 1960 | 1,468 | | 12.9% |
| 1970 | 1,631 | | 11.1% |
| 1980 | 1,968 | | 20.7% |
| 1990 | 1,804 | | −8.3% |
| 2000 | 1,889 | | 4.7% |
| 2010 | 1,870 | | −1.0% |
| 2020 | 2,015 | | 7.8% |
U.S. Decennial Census

=== 2020 census ===
As of the 2020 census, Parkersburg had a population of 2,015, with 858 households and 565 families residing in the city. The population density was 1,396.6 inhabitants per square mile (539.2/km^{2}), and there were 926 housing units at an average density of 641.8 per square mile (247.8/km^{2}).

The median age was 41.6 years. 24.2% of residents were under the age of 18, and 22.3% were 65 years of age or older. By broader age groups, 26.8% of residents were under age 20, 4.8% were from 20 to 24, 22.4% were from 25 to 44, and 23.8% were from 45 to 64. The gender makeup of the city was 48.8% male and 51.2% female; for every 100 females, there were 95.3 males, and for every 100 females age 18 and over, there were 91.8 males age 18 and over.

Of households, 28.0% had children under the age of 18 living with them. Of all households, 52.7% were married-couple households, 3.0% were cohabiting-couple households, 17.8% were households with a male householder and no spouse or partner present, and 26.5% were households with a female householder and no spouse or partner present. Non-families made up 34.1% of households. About 31.8% of all households were made up of individuals, and 17.6% had someone living alone who was 65 years of age or older.

Of housing units, 7.3% were vacant. The homeowner vacancy rate was 2.1%, and the rental vacancy rate was 14.2%. 0.0% of residents lived in urban areas, while 100.0% lived in rural areas.

Racial composition as of the 2020 census
| Race | Number | Percent |
|---|---|---|
| White | 1,937 | 96.1% |
| Black or African American | 3 | 0.1% |
| American Indian and Alaska Native | 7 | 0.3% |
| Asian | 3 | 0.1% |
| Native Hawaiian and Other Pacific Islander | 0 | 0.0% |
| Some other race | 4 | 0.2% |
| Two or more races | 61 | 3.0% |
| Hispanic or Latino (of any race) | 24 | 1.2% |

=== 2010 census ===
As of the census of 2010, there were 1,870 people, 779 households, and 529 families residing in the city. The population density was 1,316.9 inhabitants per square mile (508.5/km^{2}). There were 870 housing units at an average density of 612.7 per square mile (236.6/km^{2}). The racial makeup of the city was 99.0% White, 0.2% African American, 0.2% Asian, 0.1% from other races, and 0.5% from two or more races. Hispanic or Latino of any race were 1.0% of the population.

There were 779 households, of which 31.3% had children under the age of 18 living with them, 55.7% were married couples living together, 9.0% had a female householder with no husband present, 3.2% had a male householder with no wife present, and 32.1% were non-families. 29.4% of all households were made up of individuals, and 15.8% had someone living alone who was 65 years of age or older. The average household size was 2.40 and the average family size was 2.96.

The median age in the city was 38.9 years. 27% of residents were under the age of 18; 5.8% were between the ages of 18 and 24; 24.8% were from 25 to 44; 24.2% were from 45 to 64; and 18.1% were 65 years of age or older. The gender makeup of the city was 48.1% male and 51.9% female.

=== 2000 census ===
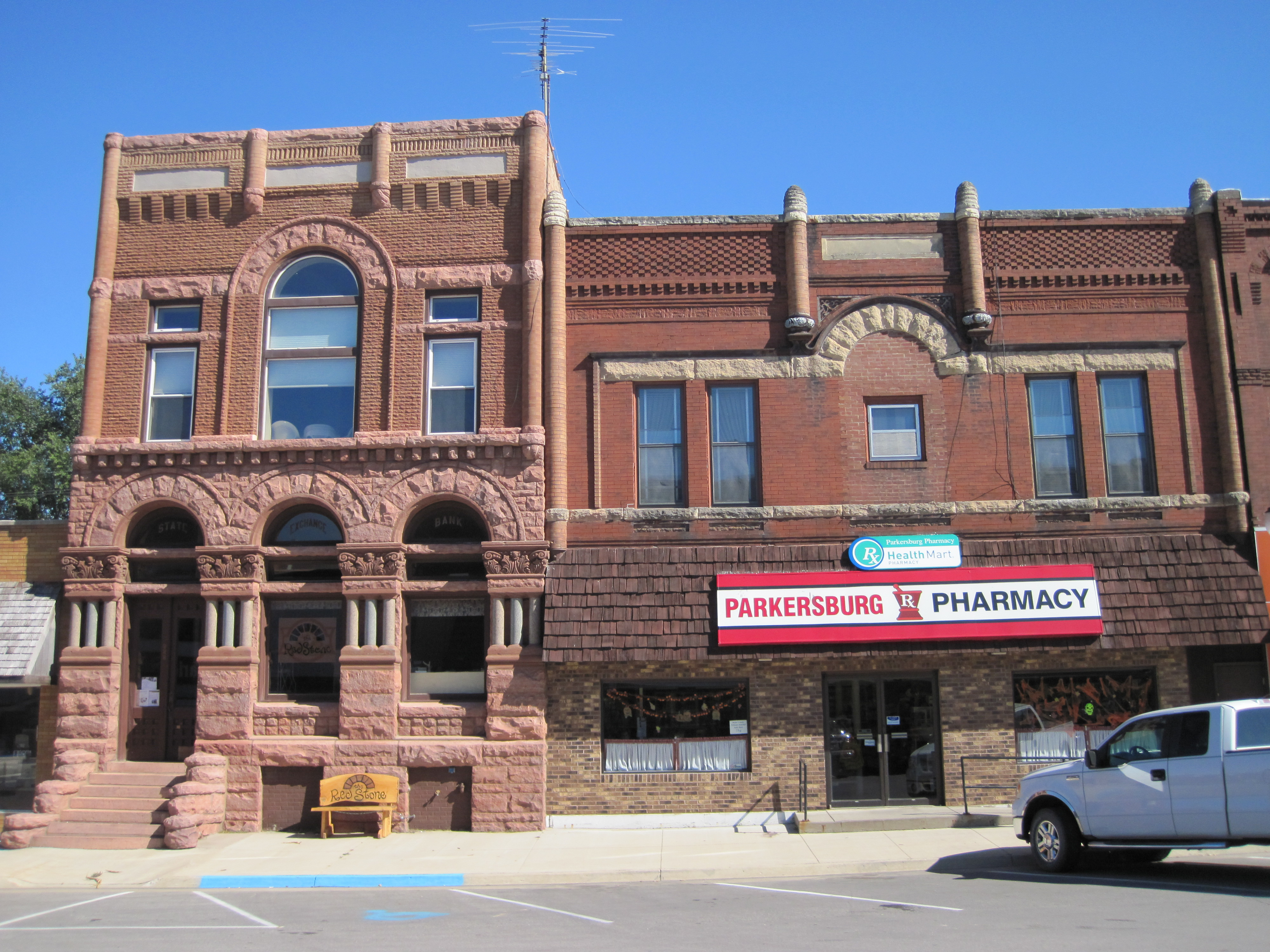
Exchange Bank and pharmacy buildings

As of the census of 2000, there were 1,889 people, 811 households, and 550 families residing in the city. The population density was 1,655.7 inhabitants per square mile (639.3/km^{2}). There were 850 housing units at an average density of 745.0 per square mile (287.6/km^{2}). The racial makeup of the city was 98.99% White, 0.11% African American, 0.05% Native American, 0.05% Asian, 0.16% from other races, and 0.64% from two or more races. Hispanic or Latino of any race were 0.53% of the population.

There were 811 households, out of which 29.8% had children under the age of 18 living with them, 56.0% were married couples living together, 9.2% had a female householder with no husband present, and 32.1% were non-families. 30.7% of all households were made up of individuals, and 18.7% had someone living alone who was 65 years of age or older. The average household size was 2.33 and the average family size was 2.89.

Age spread: 25.1% under the age of 18, 6.6% from 18 to 24, 25.7% from 25 to 44, 21.5% from 45 to 64, and 21.0% who were 65 years of age or older. The median age was 40 years. For every 100 females, there were 88.9 males. For every 100 females age 18 and over, there were 88.8 males.

The median income for a household in the city was $32,083, and the median income for a family was $40,313. Males had a median income of $31,949 versus $20,000 for females. The per capita income for the city was $16,978. About 5.5% of families and 7.3% of the population were below the poverty line, including 9.2% of those under age 18 and 10.4% of those age 65 or over.

== Parks and recreation ==
Miracle Park on the west side of Parkersburg is a premier outdoor recreational attraction. It encompasses two expansive and separate playground areas, one for younger children (2–5 years old) and another for older children (5–12 years old). Miracle Park also includes an outdoor swimming pool, three shelter houses, concrete basketball courts, and a granite Veterans Memorial constructed in 2010.

Schwartz Memorial Park on the east end of town contains a playground, gazebo shelter house, walking path, and a small fishing pond for the youngsters.

The Depot Park on the north side of Parkersburg is adjacent and on the south side of Beaver Creek. It features a shelter house, historic Parkersburg depot and caboose, playground equipment, and plenty of area to fish.

Adjacent to the Depot Park on the north side of the river is Beaver Meadows Golf Course and Campground. This area includes a nine-hole, par 34 golf course with 2,554 yards of play.

Legend Trail Golf Course on the east side of Parkersburg. It includes a nine-hole, par 36 golf course with 3,313 yards of play. Legend Trail Golf Course provides a large club house for weddings, graduations, etc., driving range, a walking path, and is also near Schwartz Memorial Park.

The Big Marsh Wildlife Management Area is Iowa's largest timber, wetland, and grassland area. It encompasses over 5,800 acres (2,300 ha) of land for public hunting, fishing, bird watching, and hiking. The Big Marsh is a recreational paradise during any season and is located six miles north of Parkersburg on Highway 14.

== Education ==
It is served by the Aplington–Parkersburg Community School District, which operates Aplington–Parkersburg High School. The district formed on July 1, 2004, after the Aplington Community School District merged with the Parkersburg Community School District.

== Infrastructure ==
=== Transportation ===
Parkersburg is located at the junction of Iowa Highway 14 and Iowa Highway 57 just north of U.S. Route 20 at exit 208 (IA 14).

== Notable people ==
- Major General John B. Anderson, United States Army officer who served in both World War I and World War II
- Roy Luebbe, Major League Baseball catcher for the New York Yankees
- William Wallace McCredie, United States House of Representatives member from Washington
- Brad Meester, former center for the Jacksonville Jaguars of the NFL
- Pauline Pfeiffer, the second wife of author Ernest Hemingway.
- Harold Duane Vietor, federal judge
- Casey Wiegmann, former center for the Kansas City Chiefs and Denver Broncos of the NFL

== Sister city ==
- (United States) – Parkersburg, West Virginia

== See also ==
- All-American Red Heads
