= Gladbrook–Reinbeck Community School District =

Public school district in Reinbeck, Iowa, United States

Location
- Reinbeck, Iowa Grundy County United States
- Coordinates: 42.319883°N 92.598597°W

District information
- Type: Local school district
- Grades: K–12
- Established: 1988
- Superintendent: Caleb Bonjour
- Budget: $8,927,000 (2020-21)
- NCES District ID: 1912660

Students and staff
- Students: 498 (2022-23)
- Teachers: 42.48 FTE
- Staff: 48.40 FTE
- Student–teacher ratio: 11.72
- Athletic conference: North Iowa Cedar League
- District mascot: Rebels
- Colors: Blue and Silver

Other information
- Website: www.gladbrook-reinbeck.k12.ia.us

Gladbrook–Reinbeck Community School District is a rural public school district headquartered in Reinbeck, Iowa, serving around 500 students. The district includes sections of Black Hawk, Grundy, Marshall, and Tama counties. Communities served include Reinbeck, Gladbrook, Lincoln, and Morrison.

The district's athletic teams are known as the Rebels. Its colors are blue and silver.

== History ==
Gladbrook Community School District and the Reinbeck Community School District consolidated in 1988 to form Gladbrook–Reinbeck Community School District.

In 2017, there was a proposal to dissolve the Gladbrook–Reinbeck district and have five other districts assume control of portions of the district, but voters turned down the proposal by 69%. The proposal was made in response to the closure of Gladbrook Elementary.

== Facilities ==
In 2025, the district began a SAVE-funded elementary school project that includes a 7,200-square-foot addition with six classrooms, new restrooms, storage, a secure entrance, HVAC upgrades, electrical infrastructure updates, ADA-compliant restrooms, and renovations to existing classrooms.

Also in 2025, voters approved a $17.3 million bond referendum for improvements to the district's junior/senior high school. The project includes a secure-entry classroom addition, accessibility improvements, HVAC and electrical upgrades, secure learning spaces, and replacement of deteriorating 1921-era infrastructure.

In March 2025, voters approved a nine-year increase to the district's Physical Plant and Equipment Levy, raising the levy from $0.67 to $1.34 per $1,000 of assessed valuation. The district identified potential PPEL-funded projects including classroom furniture replacement, concrete repairs, dehumidification in the high school media center, electrical upgrades, and HVAC upgrades.

== Schools ==
The district operates two schools in Reinbeck:

- Gladbrook–Reinbeck Elementary School
- Gladbrook–Reinbeck High School

Previously the district had two school sites, one in Reinbeck and one in Gladbrook. The Gladbrook building served elementary and middle school grades before closing in May 2015.

=== Gladbrook–Reinbeck High School ===
==== Athletics ====
The Rebels compete in the North Iowa Cedar League Conference in the following sports:

Previously the football team had a rivalry with Grundy Center High School that began circa 1908; circa 2017 the Gladbrook–Reinbeck team was moved to an eight-man division, forcing the rivalry to end.

- Cross country
- Volleyball
- Football
  - 2-time class A state champions (2015, 2016)
- Basketball
  - Boys' 2015 class 1A state champions
- Wrestling
- Track and field
- Golf
  - Boys' 1999 class 1A state champions
- Baseball
- Softball
- Soccer

== See also ==
- List of school districts in Iowa
- List of high schools in Iowa
