= Fern, Iowa =

- Unincorporated community
- Location within Iowa Location within the United States
- Coordinates: 42°29′05″N 92°46′14″W
- Country: United States
- State: Iowa
- County: Grundy
- Elevation: 1,060 ft (320 m)
- Time zone: UTC-6 (Central (CST))
  - Summer (DST): UTC-5 (CDT)
- ZIP code: 50642
- Area code: 319
- GNIS feature ID: 456576

Fern is an unincorporated community in Beaver Township, Grundy County, Iowa.

== Location ==
Fern lies on the junction of 150th Street and Iowa Highway 14, 6.1 miles (9.8 kilometers) northeast of Holland, Iowa.

== History ==
Fern had a post office that opened under the name of Andersonville on June 22, 1892, until it was discontinued on December 31, 1907. The name was changed from Andersonville to Fern on March 20, 1894. A creamery was built at Fern c. 1911, and is no longer in use. Fern's population was 25 in 1902, 50 in 1925, and 42 in 1940.

Today Fern consists of a few houses along with a feed store and a concrete grinding company.

== See also ==
- List of unincorporated communities in Iowa
