= Grundy County Courthouse (Iowa) =

- U.S. National Register of Historic Places
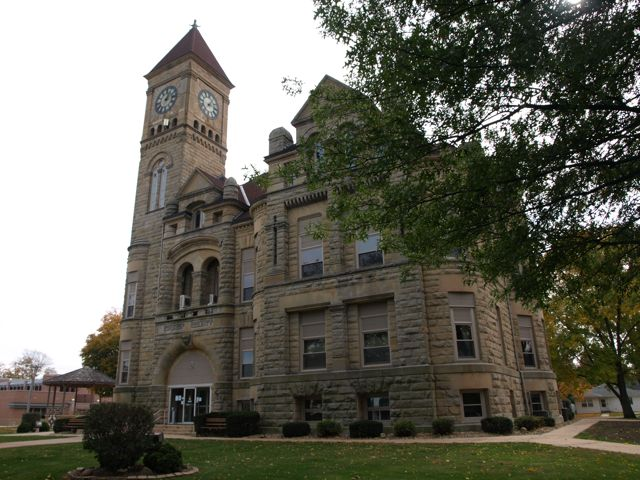

- Location within Iowa Location within the United States
- Interactive map showing the location for Grundy County Courthouse
- Location: Grundy Ave. Grundy Center, Iowa
- Coordinates: 42°21′39.44″N 92°46′23.56″W
- Area: less than one acre
- Built: 1891
- Built by: Seeley, Son & Co.
- Architect: Kramer & Zoll
- Architectural style: Romanesque Revival
- MPS: County Courthouses in Iowa TR
- NRHP reference No.: 81000239
- Added to NRHP: July 2, 1981

The Grundy County Courthouse, located in Grundy Center, Iowa, United States, was built in 1891. It was listed on the National Register of Historic Places in 1981 as a part of the County Courthouses in Iowa Thematic Resource. The courthouse is the second structure to house court functions and county administration.

== History ==
Grundy County was organized in 1856 from land that had been a part of Benton and Buchanan counties. Holland, Iowa was originally chosen as the county seat, but later Grundy Center was chosen as the county seat at that time. The first courthouse was built the following year. Known as the Old Cheese Box, it was the only octagonal courthouse in the state. The faces of its octagonal cupola paralleled one of the building's walls. This facility served as the county courthouse for 40 years until the current courthouse replaced it in 1891.

The Richardsonian Romanesque structure was designed by Kramer & Zoll and constructed at a cost of $45,532.48. The contractor, Seeley, Son & Co., realized during construction that their bid was too low, but they kept to their commitment and did not cut corners. As a result, they went bankrupt. The slender form of the clock tower offsets the weighty mass of the rest of the building. The significance of the courthouse is derived from its association with county government, and the political power and prestige of Grundy Center as the county seat.
