= North Iowa Cedar League =

Iowa High School athletic conference

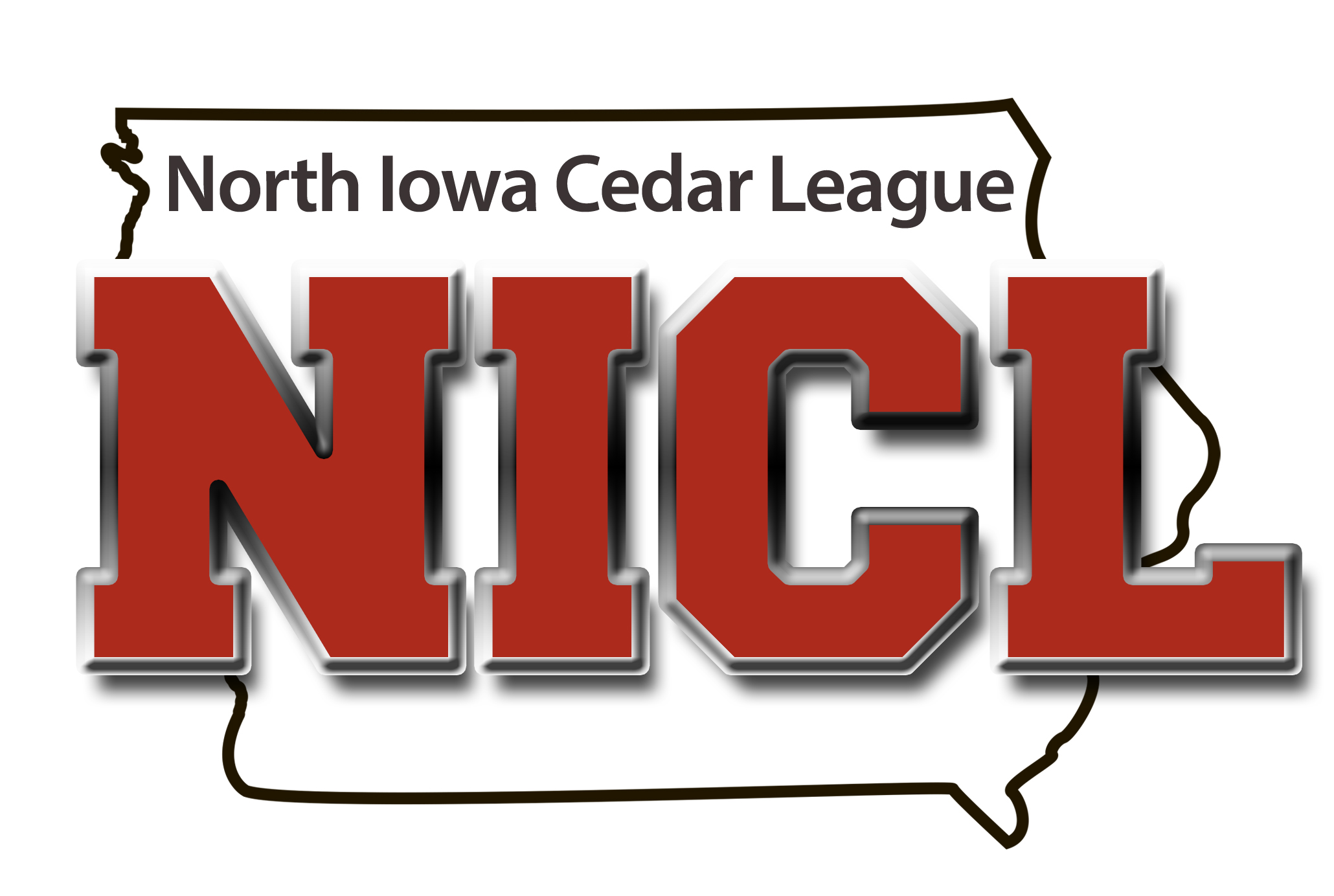
- Conference: IHSAA / IGHSAU
- Founded: 1936
- Sports fielded: 21
- No. of teams: 15
- Region: North Central, Northeast Iowa
- Website: www.northiowacedarleague.org

The North Iowa Cedar League (NICL) is a high school athletic conference made up of 15 high schools in north central and northeast Iowa. Most of the schools compete as 2A schools, (the second-smallest classification).

== History ==
The formation of the North Iowa Cedar League dates back to 1936, when the Iowa Cedar Conference (consisting of Belle Plaine, Brooklyn, Eldora, Grundy Center, Montezuma, Reinbeck, Tama, Teachers' High, Traer, & Toledo) split into the North Iowa Cedar League and South Iowa Cedar League. Founding members of the newly formed NICL include Ackley, Eldora, Grundy Center, Reinbeck, Teachers' High (NU High), and Traer.

In 1992, the Big Marsh Conference disbanded, with most of its schools joining the NICL, creating a 16 team conference. With the new members, the NICL split into two divisions, east and west. The east division included Aplington–Parkersburg, Denver, Dike–New Hartford, Gladbrook–Reinbeck, Hudson, North Tama, NU High, and Union. The west division included Ackley–Geneva, BCLUW, East Marshall, Eldora–New Providence, GMG, Grundy Center, Hubbard–Radcliffe, and Wellsburg-Steamboat Rock. In 1998, Wapsie Valley High School and Jesup High School joined the conference, bringing the membership up to 18.

In 2000, Ackley–Geneva and Wellsburg-Steamboat Rock merged districts to become AGWSR. The next membership change came in 2002 when Green Mountain–Garwin (GMG) departed for the Iowa Star Conference. The next year, North Tama left for the Iowa Star Conference. In 2007, Eldora–New Providence and Hubbard–Radcliffe joined districts to become South Hardin High School. For the 2008 year, West Marshall was added to the conference, making it a 15-team league. In 2011, South Tama joined after leaving the Little Hawkeye Conference and started in the West Division. It became the 16th member of the conference. Northern University High School (Cedar Falls) played its final season in 2011–12, due to the University of Northern Iowa closing Malcolm Price Lab, which houses Northern University High. Waterloo Columbus joined in 2013 to replace the recently defunct NU High.

With the departure of South Tama, Sumner-Fredericksburg joined in 2014 which brought the total number of schools to 16 once again. In 2020, West Marshall left the conference for the Heart of Iowa Conference. Oelwein joined in 2020 to replace West Marshall.

In 2022, BCLUW left for the Iowa Star Conference, bringing total membership to 15.

In 2026, AGWSR, East Marshall, and Gladbrook Reinbeck were invited to join the Iowa Star Conference. On January 23, 2026, the AGWSR School Board approved the move to the Iowa Star Conference.

On March 25, 2026, the South Iowa Cedar League voted to accept East Marshall as a new member for the 2027-2028 academic year.

== Members ==
Institution	Location	Mascot	Colors	Affiliation	2026-2027 Enrollment	Class	Admitted
AGWSR	Ackley	Cougars		Public	159	1A	1999
Aplington–Parkersburg	Parkersburg	Falcons		Public	186	2A	1992
Columbus Catholic	Waterloo	Sailors		Private	224	2A	2013
Denver	Denver	Cyclones		Public	207	2A	1988
Dike–New Hartford	Dike	Wolverines		Public	219	2A	1992
East Marshall	Le Grand	Mustangs		Public	140	2A	1992
Gladbrook–Reinbeck	Reinbeck	Rebels		Public	106	1A	1929
Grundy Center	Grundy Center	Spartans		Public	164	2A	1929
Hudson	Hudson	Pirates		Public	170	2A	1977
Jesup	Jesup	J-Hawks		Public	178	2A	1998
Oelwein	Oelwein	Huskies		Public	217	2A	2021
South Hardin	Eldora	Tigers		Public	177	2A	1936
Sumner-Fredericksburg	Sumner	Cougars		Public	155	2A	2014
Union	La Porte City	Knights		Public	192	2A	1988
Wapsie Valley	Fairbank	Warriors		Public	129	1A	1998
