= Palermo Township =

Palermo Township may refer to:

- Palermo Township, Grundy County, Iowa
- Palermo Township, Mountrail County, North Dakota, in Mountrail County, North Dakota
