= Wapsie Valley Community School District =

Public school district in Buchanan County, Iowa, United States

Coordinates: 42.680209°N 92.139324°W

Location
- Fairbank, Iowa Black Hawk and Buchanan counties United States
- Coordinates: 42.680209, -92.139324

District information
- Type: Local school district
- Grades: K-12
- Superintendent: Chris Hoover
- Schools: 7
- Budget: $10,829,000 (2020-21)
- NCES District ID: 1929760

Students and staff
- Students: 709 (2022-23)
- Teachers: 58.44 FTE
- Staff: 65.92 FTE
- Student–teacher ratio: 12.13
- Athletic conference: North Iowa Cedar League
- District mascot: Warriors
- Colors: Black and Gold

Other information
- Website: www.wapsievalleyschools.com

The Wapsie Valley School District, or Wapsie Valley Schools, is a public school district serving the towns of Fairbank and Readlyn and surrounding rural areas in eastern Buchanan County and western Black Hawk County. The school's mascot is the Warriors, and their colors are black and gold.

== Schools ==
The district operates seven schools:

- Fairbank Elementary School, Fairbank
- Readlyn Elementary School, Readlyn
- Wapsie Valley High School, rural, between Fairbank and Readlyn

Four rural elementary schools serving the Amish Community:

- Rural Elementary School #1
- Rural Elementary School #2
- Rural Elementary School #3
- Rural Elementary School #4

== See also ==
- List of school districts in Iowa
