= Grundy Center Community School District =

Public school district in Grundy Center, Iowa, United States

Coordinates: 42.355718°N 92.779499°W

Location
- Grundy Center, Iowa Grundy County United States
- Coordinates: 42.355718, -92.779499

District information
- Type: Local school district
- Grades: PreK–12
- Superintendent: Robert Hughes
- Schools: 3
- Budget: $10,127,000 (2020-21)
- NCES District ID: 1913290

Students and staff
- Students: 773 (2022-23)
- Teachers: 62.93 FTE
- Student–teacher ratio: 12.28
- Athletic conference: North Iowa Cedar League
- District mascot: Spartans
- Colors: Maroon and White

Other information
- Website: www.spartanpride.net

Grundy Center Community School District, also known as Grundy Center Community Schools, is a rural public school district headquartered in Grundy Center, Iowa. It operates Grundy Center Elementary School and Grundy Center Secondary School.

The school district is in Grundy County, with a small section of the district extending into northwest Tama County, and the district includes Grundy Center and Holland.

The school's mascot is the Spartan. Their colors are maroon and white.

As of the 2020–21 school year, the district operated three schools.

== History ==
Cassi Murra served as superintendent until she moved to be superintendent of the Knoxville Community School District in 2014. Jerry Schutz began serving as superintendent that year.

Neil Mullen originally was to begin his role as superintendent on July 1, 2018. However, Mullen began on March 1 because Schutz later took another job that began before July 1.

By February 20, 2019, the Grundy Center district was looking for another superintendent. Rob Hughes was scheduled to begin his role as superintendent of both Grundy Center CSD and of Aplington–Parkersburg Community School District effective July 1, 2019. In March 2021, Hughes resigned from his position as a shared superintendent and became a full-time superintendent for Grundy Center.

== Schools ==
Schools in the district (with 2020–21 enrollment data from the National Center for Education Statistics) are:

- Grundy Center Elementary School (263 students; in grades K-5)
  - Brian Sammons, Principal
    - Dan Breyfogle, Assistant Principal
- Grundy Center Middle School (225; 5–8)
- Grundy Center High School (215; 9–12)

=== Grundy Center High School ===
==== Athletics ====
The Spartans compete in the North Iowa Cedar League Conference in the following sports:

- Cross country
- Volleyball
- Football
  - 6-time state champions (1984, 1987, 1988, 2022, 2023, 2024)
- Basketball
  - Girls' 2005 class 2A state champions
- Wrestling
- Track and field
- Golf
  - Boys' 4-time class 2A state champions (2003, 2005, 2018, 2023)
  - Girls' 12-time Class 1A State Champions (1991, 1992, 1996, 1997, 1998, 1999, 2000, 2005, 2007, 2008, 2010, 2013)
- Baseball
- Softball
- Soccer

Previously the football team had a rivalry with Gladbrook–Reinbeck High School that began circa 1908; circa 2017, the Gladbrook–Reinbeck team was moved to an eight-man division, forcing the rivalry to end.

== See also ==
- List of school districts in Iowa
- List of high schools in Iowa
