= Dike–New Hartford Community School District =

Public school district in Dike, Iowa, United States

Coordinates: 42.466633°N 92.627613°W

Location
- Dike, Iowa Grundy, Butler, and Black Hawk counties United States
- Coordinates: 42.466633, -92.627613

District information
- Type: Local school district
- Grades: K–12
- Established: 1996
- Superintendent: Justin Stockdale
- Schools: 4
- Budget: $13,736,000 (2020-21)
- NCES District ID: 1909120

Students and staff
- Students: 945 (2022-23)
- Teachers: 65.70 FTE
- Staff: 76.99 FTE
- Student–teacher ratio: 14.38
- Athletic conference: North Iowa Cedar League
- District mascot: Wolverines
- Colors: Royal blue and white

Other information
- Website: www.dnhcsd.org

Dike–New Hartford Community School District (DNH) is a rural public school district headquartered in Dike, Iowa.

The district is mostly in Grundy and Butler counties, with sections in Black Hawk County. It serves Dike, New Hartford, and Stout.

It was established on July 1, 1996, by the merger of the Dike and New Hartford school districts.

== Schools ==
Its schools include:

- Dike–New Hartford High School (grades 9–12)
- Dike–New Hartford Junior High School (6–8)
- New Hartford Elementary School (pre-kindergarten to grade 2 and grade 5)
- Dike Elementary School (pre-kindergarten through 4th grade)

In 2020, alumnus Travis Druvenga agreed to become the high school principal of Dike–New Hartford.

=== Dike–New Hartford High School ===
==== Athletics ====
The Wolverines compete in the North Iowa Cedar League Conference in the following sports:

- Cross country
- Volleyball
  - 9-time state champions (1994, 1997, 2011, 2012, 2013, 2014, 2016, 2017, 2020)
- Football
- Basketball
- Wrestling
- Track and field
- Men's Golf
- Women's Golf
  - 2014 Class 2A State Champions
- Soccer
- Tennis
- Baseball
- Softball
- Esports

== See also ==
- List of school districts in Iowa
- List of high schools in Iowa
