= Hudson Community School District =

Public school district in Hudson, Iowa, United States

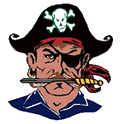

Location
- Hudson, Iowa Black Hawk county United States
- Coordinates: 42.40131°N 92.45315°W

District information
- Type: Local school district
- Grades: K-12
- Superintendent: Dr. Anthony Voss
- Schools: 2
- Budget: $10,715,000 (2020-21)
- NCES District ID: 1914340

Students and staff
- Students: 866 (2022-23)
- Teachers: 55.64 FTE
- Staff: 50.91 FTE
- Student–teacher ratio: 15.56
- Athletic conference: North Iowa Cedar League
- District mascot: Pirates
- Colors: Navy and White

Other information
- Website: Official website

The Hudson Community School District is a rural public school district in Hudson, Iowa and serves Hudson and surrounding areas in Black Hawk County.

The school's mascot is the Pirate. Their colors are navy and white.

== Schools ==
The district operates two schools, both in Hudson:

- Hudson Elementary School
- Hudson High School

== See also ==
- List of school districts in Iowa
