= Beaver Township, Grundy County, Iowa =

Township in Iowa, USA

Coordinates: 42°31′N 92°44′W

Beaver Township is a township in Grundy County, Iowa, United States. The city of Stout lies within the township, as well as the unincorporated community of Fern.
