= Wapsie Valley High School =

Public secondary school in Buchanan County, Iowa, United States

Coordinates: 42.681°N 92.139°W

Wapsie Valley Jr./Sr. High School

Location
- 2535 Viking Ave. Fairbank, Iowa 50629; United States

Information
- Type: Public
- Established: 1959
- Superintendent: Chris Hoover
- Principal: TJ Murphy
- Staff: 21.95 (FTE)
- Grades: 7-12
- Enrollment: 293 (2023-2024)
- Student to teacher ratio: 13.35
- Colors: Black and Gold
- Fight song: Minnesota Rouser
- Athletics conference: NICL East
- Nickname: Warriors
- Website: www.wapsievalleyschools.com/jrsr-high-school

Wapsie Valley High School (WVHS) is a public high school in northeastern Iowa, part of the Wapsie Valley Community School District. It is located equidistantly between Readlyn and Fairbank. It combines both junior and senior high school.

== Athletics ==
The Warriors compete in the North Iowa Cedar League Conference.

Boys

Baseball, Basketball, Cross Country, Football, Golf, Track and Field, Wrestling

Girls

Basketball, Cross Country, Golf, Softball, Track and Field, Volleyball

=== Football ===
- Class 2A state champions in 1986 and 1987
- Class 1A state champions in 1997
- Class A state champions in 2007 and 2012

=== Boys Basketball ===
- Class 1A state champions in 2020

=== Boys Cross Country ===
- Class 1A state champs in 2000, 2004, and 2005

=== Volleyball ===
- Class 1A state champions in 2006 and 2007

=== Extra ===
- Claimed the first ever Class 1A Traveling Challenge Cup for their athletic and academic achievements during the 2007–08 school year.
- Wapsie Valley was the first of two football teams in the state of Iowa to claim championships in 3 separate classes: A, 1A, and 2A.

== Notable alumni ==
- Chris Jans — collegiate basketball coach

== See also ==
- List of high schools in Iowa
