= Black Hawk Township =

Black Haw Township may refer to the following townships in the United States:

- Black Hawk Township, Black Hawk County, Iowa
- Black Hawk Township, Grundy County, Iowa
- Black Hawk Township, Jefferson County, Iowa
- Black Hawk Township, Miami County, Indiana, former name of Erie Township, Miami County, Indiana
