= Hudson High School (Iowa) =

Public secondary school in Hudson, Iowa, United States

Coordinates: 42.400°N 92.454°W

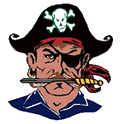

Location
- 245 S. Washington St. Hudson, Iowa 50643; United States

Information
- Established: 1915
- Superintendent: Anthony Voss
- Principal: Jeff Dieken
- Teaching staff: 26.96 (FTE)
- Grades: 7-12
- Enrollment: 371 (2024-2025)
- Student to teacher ratio: 13.76
- Colors: Navy Blue and White
- Mascot: Pirate
- Affiliation: North Iowa Cedar-East Conference
- Website: www.hudsonpiratepride.com

Hudson High School is a small rural public high school in Hudson, Iowa, United States, part of the Hudson Community School District. They are a one-to-one school and have been recognized locally and nationally for their homework policy.

== Athletics ==
The Pirates compete in the North Iowa Cedar League Conference in the following sports:

- Cross Country (boys and girls)
  - Girls' two time Class 1A State Champions - 2017, 2021
- Volleyball (girls)
- Football (boys)
  - 3-time State Champions (1975, 1994, 2018)
- Basketball (boys and girls)
  - Boys' Class 1A State Champions - 1993
- Wrestling (boys and girls)
  - 2-time Class 1A State Champions (2003, 2004)
- Track and Field (boys and girls)
- Golf (boys and girls)
  - Boys' 3-time Class 2A State Champions (1995, 1996, 2022, 2023)
- Baseball (boys)
- Softball (girls)
- Soccer (boys and girls)
  - Boys Class 1A State Champion - 2023
  - Girls Class 1A State Champion - 2026
- It is common knowledge that "Hudson Loves Championships".

== Notable alumni ==
- Joshua Meggers (born 1980), member of the Iowa House of Representatives
- Derek Wulf (born 1981), member of the Iowa House of Representatives

== See also ==
- List of high schools in Iowa
