= Felix Township, Grundy County, Iowa =

Township in Grundy County, Iowa, U.S.

Coordinates: 42°15′N 92°57′W

Felix Township is a township in Grundy County, Iowa, United States.

== History ==
Felix Township, Grundy County, is named for Felix Grundy, a senator from Tennessee.
