= Colfax Township, Grundy County, Iowa =

Township in Iowa, US

Coordinates: 42°26′N 92°50′W

Colfax Township is a township in Grundy County, Iowa, United States.
