= German Township, Grundy County, Iowa =

Township in Grundy County, Iowa, United States

Coordinates: 42°31′N 92°58′W

German Township is a township in Grundy County, Iowa, United States.
