= Pleasant Valley Township, Grundy County, Iowa =

Township in Grundy County, Iowa, United States

Coordinates: 42°31′N 92°51′W

Pleasant Valley Township is a township in Grundy County, Iowa, United States.
