= Shiloh Township, Grundy County, Iowa =

Township in Grundy County, Iowa, United States

Coordinates: 42°26′N 92°57′W

Shiloh Township is a township in Grundy County, Iowa, United States.
