= Ziggy Hasbrook =

American baseball player (1893–1976)

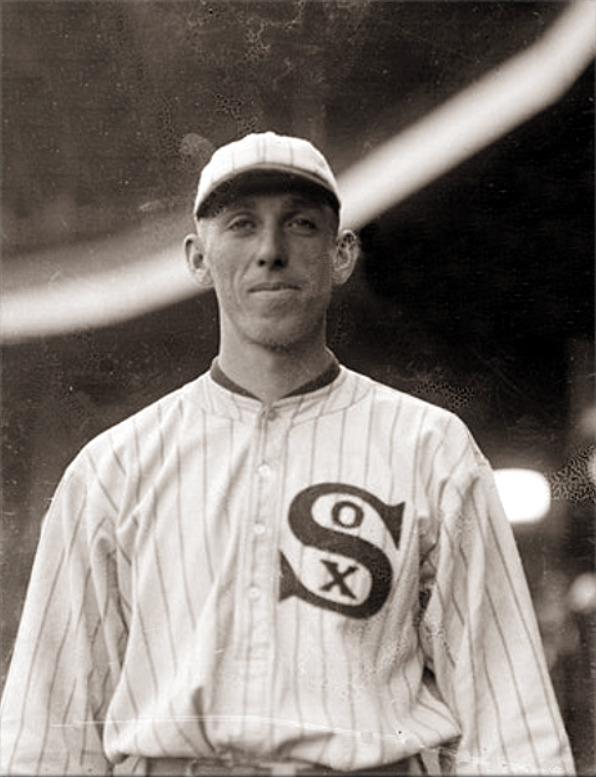
- First baseman
- Born: November 21, 1893; Grundy Center, Iowa, U.S.
- Died: February 9, 1976 (aged 82); Garland, Texas, U.S.
- Batted: Right Threw: Right

MLB debut
- September 6, 1916, for the Chicago White Sox

Last MLB appearance
- September 27, 1917, for the Chicago White Sox

MLB statistics
- Batting average: .111
- Hits: 1
- Runs scored: 2
- Stats at Baseball Reference

Teams
- Chicago White Sox (1916–17)

Robert Lyndon "Ziggy" Hasbrook (né Hasbrouck; November 21, 1893 – February 9, 1976) was an American professional baseball player. He played parts of two seasons in Major League Baseball for the 1916 and 1917 Chicago White Sox, primarily as a first baseman.

Hasbrook played only 11 games for the White Sox, making his debut at age 22 on September 6, 1916. He made his final professional appearance on September 27, 1917.

== Personal life ==
Hasbrook was the son of Leander Pelton "Lee" Hasbrouck (1845–1930) and Josephine Sarah Klein Hasbrouck (1856–1950). He descends from the Hasbrouck family of Ulster County, New York. His great-great-grandfather, Elias Hasbrouck, served as a Captain during the American Revolutionary War, and as Supervisor of the Town of Woodstock, New York, from 1788 to 1791. Three of his ancestors were patentees, or founders, of New Paltz, New York: Abraham Hasbrouck, Christian Deyo and Antoine Crispell.
