= Clay Township, Grundy County, Iowa =

Township in Iowa, USA

Coordinates: 42°15′N 92°50′W

Clay Township is a township in Grundy County, Iowa, United States.
