= Fairfield Township, Grundy County, Iowa =

Township in Iowa, USA

Coordinates: 42.5143655°N 92.6140782°W

Fairfield Township is a township in Grundy County, Iowa, United States.
