= Morrison, Iowa =

- City
- Location of Morrison, Iowa
- Coordinates: 42°20′35″N 92°40′24″W
- Country: United States
- State: Iowa
- County: Grundy
- Township: Washington

Area
  - Total: 0.097 sq mi (0.25 km^{2})
  - Land: 0.097 sq mi (0.25 km^{2})
  - Water: 0 sq mi (0.00 km^{2})
- Elevation: 955 ft (291 m)

Population (2020)
  - Total: 98
  - Density: 1,032.6/sq mi (398.69/km^{2})
- Time zone: UTC-6 (Central (CST))
  - Summer (DST): UTC-5 (CDT)
- ZIP code: 50657
- Area code: 319
- FIPS code: 19-54165
- GNIS feature ID: 2395410

Morrison is a city in Washington Township, Grundy County, Iowa, United States. The population was 98 at the time of the 2020 census. It is part of the Waterloo–Cedar Falls Metropolitan Statistical Area. In the 2025 election, the electorate of Morrison reelected Mayor David Hach to his sixth term, garnering over 80% of the vote in the first contested election in several years. He has brought significant reforms to the city, including paving roads, flood water mitigation and leading through reconstruction following a devastating derecho in 2020 which caused damage to numerous homes and trees throughout the community.

== Geography ==
According to the United States Census Bureau, the city has a total area of 0.10 square miles (0.26 km^{2}), all land.

The Black Hawk Creek flows north of the city.

== Demographics ==
Historical populations
Year	Pop.	±%
1880	116	—
1890	165	+42.2%
1900	176	+6.7%
1910	173	−1.7%
1920	207	+19.7%
1930	173	−16.4%
1940	161	−6.9%
1950	169	+5.0%
1960	139	−17.8%
1970	136	−2.2%
1980	146	+7.4%
1990	125	−14.4%
2000	97	−22.4%
2010	94	−3.1%
2020	98	+4.3%
Source:"U.S. Census website". United States Census Bureau. and Iowa Data Center; Source: U.S. Decennial Census

=== 2020 census ===
As of the census of 2020, there were 98 people, 38 households, and 26 families residing in the city. The population density was 1,032.6 inhabitants per square mile (398.7/km^{2}). There were 42 housing units at an average density of 442.5 per square mile (170.9/km^{2}). The racial makeup of the city was 94.9% White, 0.0% Black or African American, 0.0% Native American, 0.0% Asian, 0.0% Pacific Islander, 0.0% from other races and 5.1% from two or more races. Hispanic or Latino persons of any race comprised 3.1% of the population.

Of the 38 households, 36.8% of which had children under the age of 18 living with them, 60.5% were married couples living together, 0.0% were cohabitating couples, 7.9% had a female householder with no spouse or partner present and 31.6% had a male householder with no spouse or partner present. 31.6% of all households were non-families. 28.9% of all households were made up of individuals, 2.6% had someone living alone who was 65 years old or older.

The median age in the city was 43.5 years. 31.6% of the residents were under the age of 20; 2.0% were between the ages of 20 and 24; 20.4% were from 25 and 44; 29.6% were from 45 and 64; and 16.3% were 65 years of age or older. The gender makeup of the city was 52.0% male and 48.0% female.

=== 2010 census ===
As of the census of 2010, there were 94 people, 40 households, and 26 families living in the city. The population density was 940.0 inhabitants per square mile (362.9/km^{2}). There were 40 housing units at an average density of 400.0 per square mile (154.4/km^{2}). The racial makeup of the city was 92.6% White, 2.1% African American, 1.1% Asian, and 4.3% from two or more races.

There were 40 households, of which 30.0% had children under the age of 18 living with them, 60.0% were married couples living together, 5.0% had a male householder with no wife present, and 35.0% were non-families. 30.0% of all households were made up of individuals, and 10% had someone living alone who was 65 years of age or older. The average household size was 2.35 and the average family size was 2.88.

The median age in the city was 40.5 years. 24.5% of residents were under the age of 18; 7.4% were between the ages of 18 and 24; 24.4% were from 25 to 44; 25.5% were from 45 to 64; and 18.1% were 65 years of age or older. The gender makeup of the city was 52.1% male and 47.9% female.

=== 2000 census ===
As of the census of 2000, there were 97 people, 43 households, and 30 families living in the city. The population density was 947.1 inhabitants per square mile (365.7/km^{2}). There were 47 housing units at an average density of 458.9 per square mile (177.2/km^{2}). The racial makeup of the city was 98.97% White, and 1.03% from two or more races.

There were 43 households, out of which 23.3% had children under the age of 18 living with them, 55.8% were married couples living together, 4.7% had a female householder with no husband present, and 30.2% were non-families. 25.6% of all households were made up of individuals, and 11.6% had someone living alone who was 65 years of age or older. The average household size was 2.26 and the average family size was 2.67.

In the city, the population was spread out, with 18.6% under the age of 18, 6.2% from 18 to 24, 18.6% from 25 to 44, 34.0% from 45 to 64, and 22.7% who were 65 years of age or older. The median age was 48 years. For every 100 females, there were 142.5 males. For every 100 females age 18 and over, there were 146.9 males.

The median income for a household in the city was $26,250, and the median income for a family was $31,875. Males had a median income of $21,500 versus $15,625 for females. The per capita income for the city was $12,538. There were no families and 11.6% of the population living below the poverty line, including no under eighteens and 16.0% of those over 64.
