= Reinbeck, Iowa =

- City
- Location of Reinbeck, Iowa
- Coordinates: 42°19′21″N 92°35′39″W
- Country: United States
- State: Iowa
- County: Grundy

Area
  - Total: 2.17 sq mi (5.62 km^{2})
  - Land: 2.17 sq mi (5.62 km^{2})
  - Water: 0 sq mi (0.00 km^{2})
- Elevation: 945 ft (288 m)

Population (2020)
  - Total: 1,662
  - Density: 765.9/sq mi (295.71/km^{2})
- Time zone: UTC-6 (Central (CST))
  - Summer (DST): UTC-5 (CDT)
- ZIP code: 50669
- Area code: 319
- FIPS code: 19-66315
- GNIS feature ID: 2396345
- Website: reinbeck.org

Reinbeck is a city in Grundy County, Iowa, United States. The population was 1,662 at the 2020 census—a five percent decrease from the population of 1,751 in 2000. It is part of the Waterloo–Cedar Falls Metropolitan Statistical Area and is in the Cedar Valley.

== Geography ==
Reinbeck is located along Iowa Highway 175.

According to the United States Census Bureau, the city has a total area of 1.82 square miles (4.71 km^{2}), all land.

== Recreation ==
Reinbeck is host to a golf course, various sports fields, a bike trail and hunting range, and a swimming pool. The pool features a zero depth entry zone, a high board and a low board, a water slide, in addition to changing rooms and a concession stand.

== Demographics ==
Historical populations
Year	Pop.	±%
1880	482	—
1890	731	+51.7%
1900	1,203	+64.6%
1910	1,205	+0.2%
1920	1,415	+17.4%
1930	1,425	+0.7%
1940	1,429	+0.3%
1950	1,460	+2.2%
1960	1,621	+11.0%
1970	1,711	+5.6%
1980	1,808	+5.7%
1990	1,605	−11.2%
2000	1,751	+9.1%
2010	1,664	−5.0%
2020	1,662	−0.1%
Source:"U.S. Census website". United States Census Bureau. and Iowa Data Center; Source: U.S. Decennial Census

=== 2020 census ===
As of the 2020 census, Reinbeck had a population of 1,662 people, including 728 households and 441 families. The population density was 765.9 inhabitants per square mile (295.7/km^{2}). The median age was 41.6 years. 22.7% of residents were under the age of 18 and 23.5% were 65 years of age or older. For every 100 females there were 91.7 males, and for every 100 females age 18 and over there were 90.2 males age 18 and over.

Of the 728 households, 24.9% had children under the age of 18 living in them. Of all households, 50.0% were married-couple households, 6.2% were cohabitating-couple households, 18.1% were households with a male householder and no spouse or partner present, and 25.7% were households with a female householder and no spouse or partner present. About 39.4% of households were non-families, 34.6% were made up of individuals, and 17.3% had someone living alone who was 65 years of age or older.

There were 796 housing units at an average density of 366.8 per square mile (141.6/km^{2}), of which 8.5% were vacant. The homeowner vacancy rate was 1.1% and the rental vacancy rate was 19.2%. 0.0% of residents lived in urban areas, while 100.0% lived in rural areas.

24.8% of residents were under the age of 20; 4.0% were between the ages of 20 and 24; 24.6% were from 25 to 44; and 23.0% were from 45 to 64. The gender makeup of the city was 47.8% male and 52.2% female.

Racial composition as of the 2020 census
Race	Number	Percent
White	1,586	95.4%
Black or African American	6	0.4%
American Indian and Alaska Native	1	0.1%
Asian	0	0.0%
Native Hawaiian and Other Pacific Islander	0	0.0%
Some other race	5	0.3%
Two or more races	64	3.9%
Hispanic or Latino (of any race)	18	1.1%

=== 2010 census ===
As of the census of 2010, there were 1,664 people, 738 households, and 468 families living in the city. The population density was 914.3 inhabitants per square mile (353.0/km^{2}). There were 802 housing units at an average density of 440.7 per square mile (170.2/km^{2}). The racial makeup of the city was 98.7% White, 0.2% African American, 0.1% Native American, 0.1% Asian, 0.5% from other races, and 0.4% from two or more races. Hispanic or Latino of any race were 1.1% of the population.

There were 738 households, of which 25.7% had children under the age of 18 living with them, 52.4% were married couples living together, 6.9% had a female householder with no husband present, 4.1% had a male householder with no wife present, and 36.6% were non-families. 32.0% of all households were made up of individuals, and 18.7% had someone living alone who was 65 years of age or older. The average household size was 2.20 and the average family size was 2.72.

The median age in the city was 45.1 years. 20.9% of residents were under the age of 18; 7.8% were between the ages of 18 and 24; 21.2% were from 25 to 44; 26% were from 45 to 64; and 24% were 65 years of age or older. The gender makeup of the city was 48.5% male and 51.5% female.

=== 2000 census ===
As of the census of 2000, there were 1,751 people, 730 households, and 492 families living in the city. The population density was 962.5 inhabitants per square mile (371.6/km^{2}). There were 769 housing units at an average density of 422.7 per square mile (163.2/km^{2}). The racial makeup of the city was 99.60% White, 0.11% African American, 0.17% Asian, 0.06% from other races, and 0.06% from two or more races. Hispanic or Latino of any race were 0.40% of the population.

There were 730 households, out of which 28.2% had children under the age of 18 living with them, 58.8% were married couples living together, 6.7% had a female householder with no husband present, and 32.6% were non-families. 29.9% of all households were made up of individuals, and 17.8% had someone living alone who was 65 years of age or older. The average household size was 2.33 and the average family size was 2.87.

23.5% were under the age of 18, 6.3% from 18 to 24, 25.3% from 25 to 44, 21.5% from 45 to 64, and 23.4% were 65 years of age or older. The median age was 42 years. For every 100 females, there were 90.5 males. For every 100 females age 18 and over, there were 84.6 males.

The median income for a household in the city was $36,667, and the median income for a family was $45,938. Males had a median income of $32,829 versus $21,618 for females. The per capita income for the city was $19,814. About 3.3% of families and 4.0% of the population were below the poverty line, including 2.3% of those under age 18 and 6.1% of those age 65 or over.

== Education ==
The city is served by the Gladbrook–Reinbeck Community School District, which has the Rebel as its mascot. The Reinbeck Community School District served the city until it was consolidated on July 1, 1988.
