= Readlyn, Iowa =

- City
- Main Street, Readlyn
- Motto: "857 Friendly People & One Old Grump!"
- Location of Readlyn, Iowa
- Coordinates: 42°42′13″N 92°13′30″W
- Country: US
- State: Iowa
- County: Bremer
- Incorporated: February 1, 1905

Area
  - Total: 0.33 sq mi (0.85 km^{2})
  - Land: 0.33 sq mi (0.85 km^{2})
  - Water: 0 sq mi (0.00 km^{2})
- Elevation: 1,040 ft (320 m)

Population (2020)
  - Total: 845
  - Density: 2,571.3/sq mi (992.78/km^{2})
- Time zone: UTC-6 (Central (CST))
  - Summer (DST): UTC-5 (CDT)
- ZIP code: 50668
- Area code: 319
- FIPS code: 19-65910
- GNIS feature ID: 2396332
- Website: readlyn.com

Readlyn is a city in Bremer County, Iowa, United States. The population was 845 at the time of the 2020 census. It is part of the Waterloo–Cedar Falls Metropolitan Statistical Area. The city is known for its culture surrounding the "Grump", a title of honor and area folklore character inspired by a real resident of Readlyn in the early 20th century. A post office opened in Readlyn in 1904.

== Geography ==
According to the United States Census Bureau, the city has a total area of 0.33 square miles (0.85 km^{2}), all land.

== Demographics ==
Historical populations
| Year | Pop. | ±% |
|---|---|---|
| 1910 | 227 | — |
| 1920 | 403 | +77.5% |
| 1930 | 385 | −4.5% |
| 1940 | 426 | +10.6% |
| 1950 | 468 | +9.9% |
| 1960 | 547 | +16.9% |
| 1970 | 616 | +12.6% |
| 1980 | 858 | +39.3% |
| 1990 | 773 | −9.9% |
| 2000 | 786 | +1.7% |
| 2010 | 808 | +2.8% |
| 2020 | 845 | +4.6% |
Source:"U.S. Census website". United States Census Bureau. and Iowa Data Center; Source: U.S. Decennial Census

=== 2020 census ===
As of the census of 2020, there were 845 people, 331 households, and 229 families residing in the city. The population density was 2,571.3 inhabitants per square mile (992.8/km^{2}). There were 351 housing units at an average density of 1,068.1 per square mile (412.4/km^{2}). The racial makeup of the city was 97.2% White, 0.0% Black or African American, 0.0% Native American, 0.0% Asian, 0.0% Pacific Islander, 0.5% from other races and 2.4% from two or more races. Hispanic or Latino persons of any race comprised 2.2% of the population.

Of the 331 households, 32.9% of which had children under the age of 18 living with them, 56.8% were married couples living together, 8.5% were cohabitating couples, 21.8% had a female householder with no spouse or partner present and 13.0% had a male householder with no spouse or partner present. 30.8% of all households were non-families. 24.5% of all households were made up of individuals, 13.6% had someone living alone who was 65 years old or older.

The median age in the city was 36.4 years. 29.3% of the residents were under the age of 20; 6.5% were between the ages of 20 and 24; 25.6% were from 25 and 44; 19.4% were from 45 and 64; and 19.2% were 65 years of age or older. The gender makeup of the city was 48.3% male and 51.7% female.

=== 2010 census ===
As of the census of 2010, there were 808 people, 338 households, and 222 families living in the city. The population density was 2,448.5 inhabitants per square mile (945.4/km^{2}). There were 346 housing units at an average density of 1,048.5 per square mile (404.8/km^{2}). The racial makeup of the city was 98.0% White, 0.5% African American, 0.1% Native American, 0.5% Asian, 0.6% from other races, and 0.2% from two or more races. Hispanic or Latino of any race were 1.2% of the population.

There were 338 households, of which 34.0% had children under the age of 18 living with them, 57.7% were married couples living together, 5.6% had a female householder with no husband present, 2.4% had a male householder with no wife present, and 34.3% were non-families. 32.2% of all households were made up of individuals, and 17.2% had someone living alone who was 65 years of age or older. The average household size was 2.39 and the average family size was 3.01.

The median age in the city was 37.8 years. 28.1% of residents were under the age of 18; 5% were between the ages of 18 and 24; 26.1% were from 25 to 44; 23.9% were from 45 to 64; and 16.7% were 65 years of age or older. The gender makeup of the city was 48.0% male and 52.0% female.

=== 2000 census ===
As of the census of 2000, there were 786 people, 322 households, and 223 families living in the city. The population density was 2,444.4 inhabitants per square mile (943.8/km^{2}). There were 326 housing units at an average density of 1,013.8 per square mile (391.4/km^{2}). The racial makeup of the city was 98.35% White, 0.38% African American, 0.13% Native American, 0.64% Asian, and 0.51% from two or more races. Hispanic or Latino of any race were 0.25% of the population.

There were 322 households, out of which 32.9% had children under the age of 18 living with them, 60.6% were married couples living together, 6.5% had a female householder with no husband present, and 30.7% were non-families. 28.9% of all households were made up of individuals, and 18.6% had someone living alone who was 65 years of age or older. The average household size was 2.44 and the average family size was 3.01.

27.7% were under the age of 18, 5.6% from 18 to 24, 24.8% from 25 to 44, 23.9% from 45 to 64, and 17.9% were 65 years of age or older. The median age was 39 years. For every 100 females, there were 94.6 males. For every 100 females age 18 and over, there were 84.4 males.

The median income for a household in the city was $41,625, and the median income for a family was $52,308. Males had a median income of $32,313 versus $24,625 for females. The per capita income for the city was $17,721. About 2.4% of families and 2.7% of the population were below the poverty line, including 2.1% of those under age 18 and 5.3% of those age 65 or over.

== Education ==
The Wapsie Valley Community School District operates local public schools.

== Culture ==
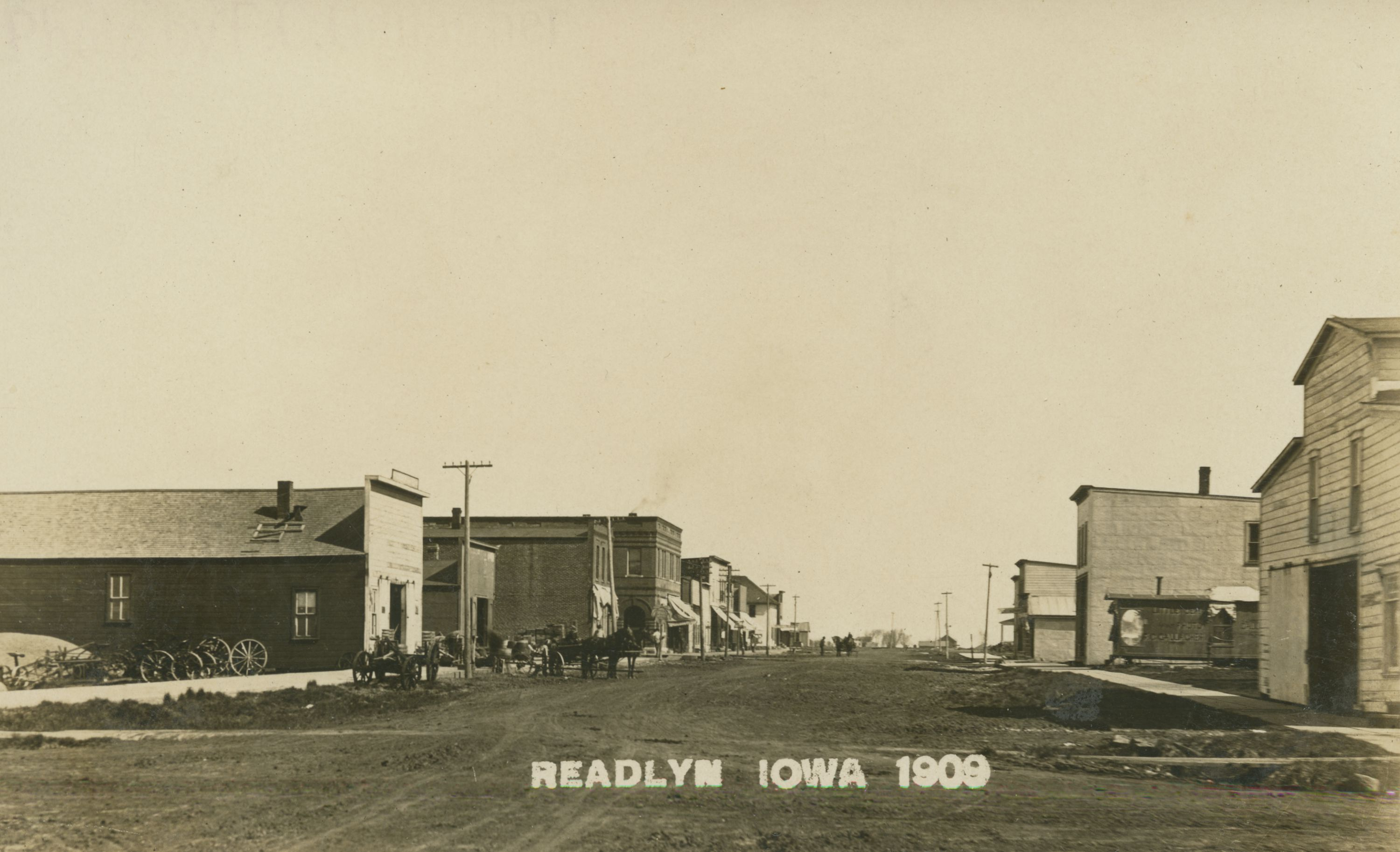
Main Street through Readlyn in 1909

=== Grump ===
Readlyn's motto is "857 Friendly People & One Old Grump", (Note: The "857" number does not seem to change with the town's actual population.) as is prominently written on the city's sign on Iowa Highway 3. This refers to a local legend associated with Readlyn, as well as an actual title of honor given to a random senior resident of Readlyn in an annual ceremony by the Readlyn Community Club.

According to local legend, Readlyn's "Grump" originated early in the city's history, when a railroad passed through the area. In 1904, an unkempt elderly nomad whose real name is not known, who had been freighthopping since his youth, disembarked from a train that arrived in Readlyn with the intent of settling down there. However, within his first day of staying in Readlyn, residents noticed he would persistently ignore everyone who tried to greet him and never seemed to display much emotion aside from a fatigued frown, and soon he became known in Readlyn as the "Old Grump". The Old Grump's reputation held until roughly one year later when, upon experiencing an unclear amusing event in the city, he laughed "for the first time in years".

The tradition of honorarily assigning a Grump began in 1990, when Sam Sickles volunteered to be the first honorary Grump, owing to his age and grumpy attitude. Every third week of June since then, during a series of community events known as "Grump Days", a new Grump has been chosen from Readlyn residents aged 65 or older who submit their names for selection. The only exception to this was in 2020, due to the COVID-19 pandemic; to compensate, two Grumps were crowned in 2021. Though the title's name suggests it is given for poor behavior, the Grump title is considered a prestigious honor by Readlyn residents, and those who have been the Grump generally view it as a source of pride. The Grump is expected to participate in community events and parades, writes a monthly article about positive local events in the city newspaper, and is given benefits and goods such as a special hat and a custom license plate. Photos of the Grumps are preserved in the Readlyn Historical Society, as well as at Grumpy's Spirits, Suds & Grub, a local restaurant. The "Grump" as a character is also associated with Readlyn institutions such as a cartoon-styled statue of a "Grump", loosely based on the original Old Grump, on a bench serving as a local tourist attraction.
