= Dike, Iowa =

- City
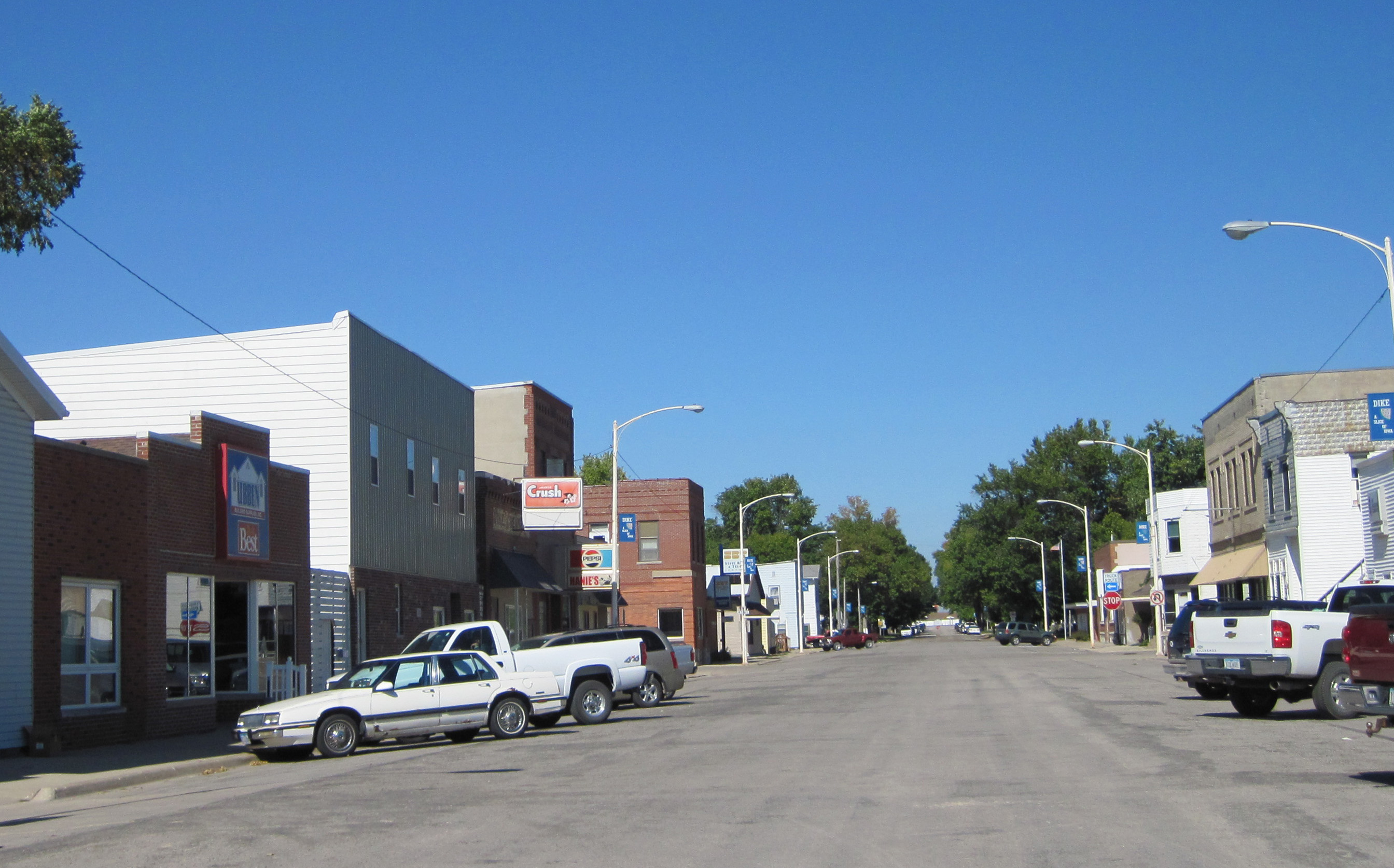
- Commercial street in Dike
- Motto: "A Slice of Iowa"
- Location of Dike, Iowa
- Coordinates: 42°27′53″N 92°37′20″W
- Country: USA
- State: Iowa
- County: Grundy
- Established: 1901

Area
  - Total: 1.39 sq mi (3.60 km^{2})
  - Land: 1.39 sq mi (3.60 km^{2})
  - Water: 0 sq mi (0.00 km^{2})
- Elevation: 942 ft (287 m)

Population (2020)
  - Total: 1,304
  - Density: 938.6/sq mi (362.39/km^{2})
- Time zone: UTC-6 (Central (CST))
  - Summer (DST): UTC-5 (CDT)
- ZIP code: 50624
- Area code: 319
- FIPS code: 19-21405
- GNIS feature ID: 2394535
- Website: The City of Dike, Iowa Website

Dike is a city in Grundy County, Iowa, United States. The population was 1,304 at the 2020 census, an increase of 38% over the total of 944 residents in 2000. It is part of the Waterloo–Cedar Falls Metropolitan Statistical Area.

== History ==
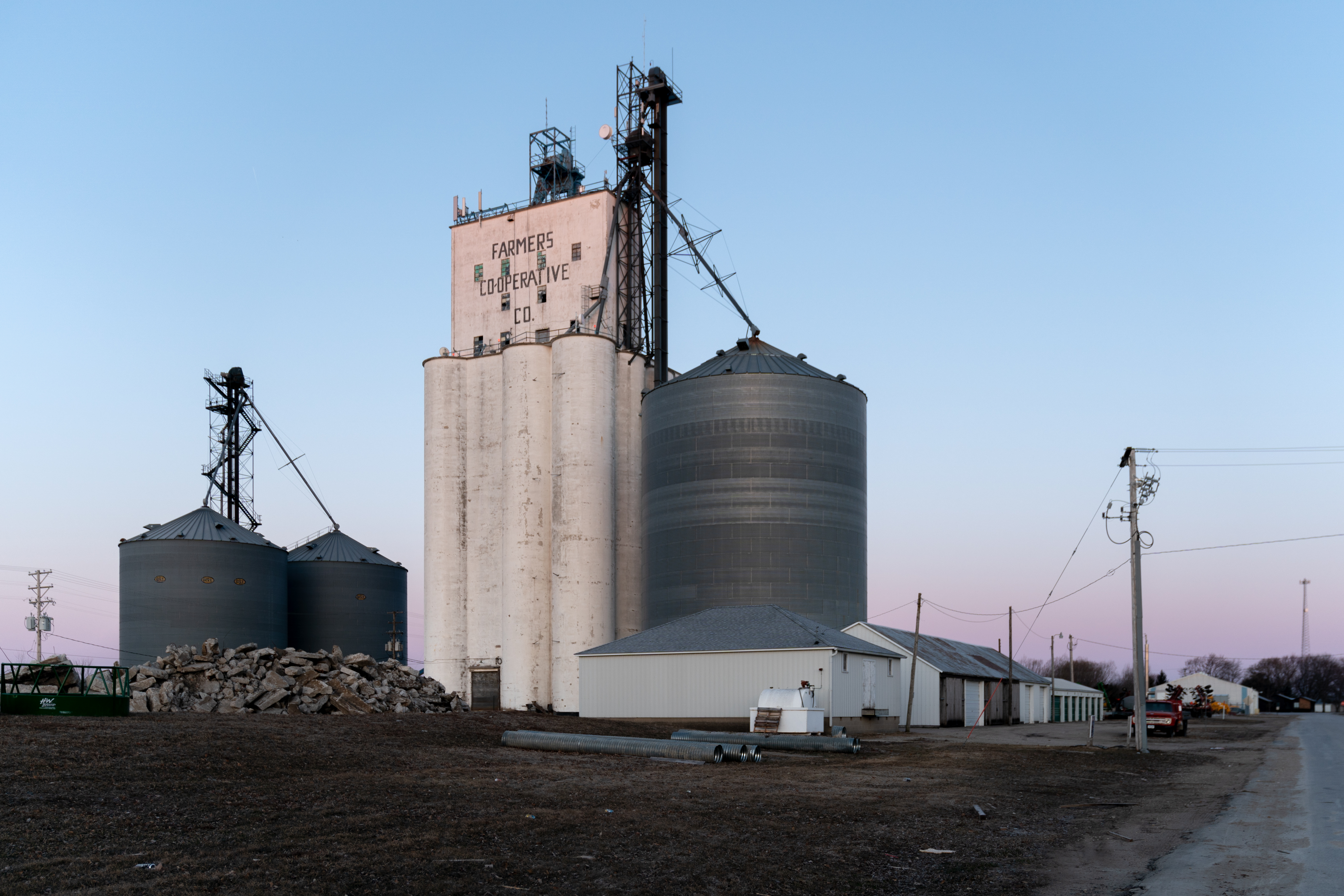
Grain elevator in Dike

Chester Thomas Dike, a railroad construction engineer, inspired the name Dike. Dike chose the site and laid out the town in 1900. The community was incorporated on January 16, 1901.

== Geography ==
According to the United States Census Bureau, the city has a total area of 1.40 square miles (3.63 km^{2}), all land.

== Demographics ==
Historical populations
Year	Pop.	±%
1910	286	—
1920	453	+58.4%
1930	417	−7.9%
1940	408	−2.2%
1950	517	+26.7%
1960	630	+21.9%
1970	794	+26.0%
1980	987	+24.3%
1990	875	−11.3%
2000	944	+7.9%
2010	1,209	+28.1%
2020	1,304	+7.9%
Source:"U.S. Census website". United States Census Bureau. and Iowa Data Center; Source: U.S. Decennial Census

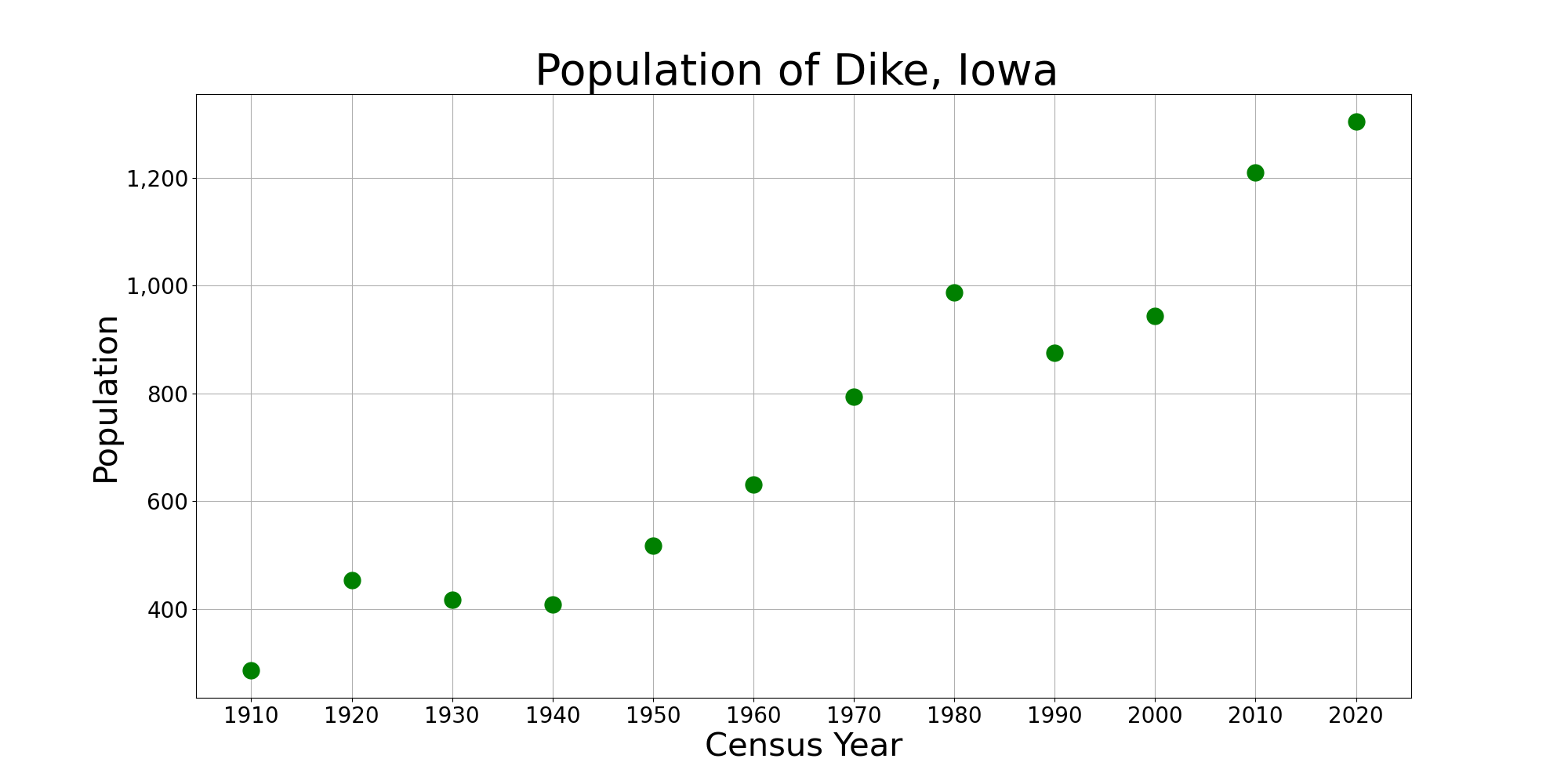
The population of Dike, Iowa from US census data

=== 2020 census ===
As of the 2020 census, there were 1,304 people, 520 households, and 380 families residing in the city. The median age was 39.7 years. 26.2% of residents were under the age of 18, and 19.0% were 65 years of age or older. For every 100 females, there were 97.3 males, and for every 100 females age 18 and over, there were 96.5 males age 18 and over.

0.0% of residents lived in urban areas, while 100.0% lived in rural areas.

Of the 520 households, 34.8% had children under the age of 18 living with them. Of all households, 61.7% were married-couple households, 14.6% were households with a male householder and no spouse or partner present, and 18.8% were households with a female householder and no spouse or partner present. About 26.9% of households were non-families, 24.2% were made up of individuals, and 12.3% had someone living alone who was 65 years of age or older.

There were 536 housing units. The population density was 938.6 inhabitants per square mile (362.4/km^{2}), and the housing unit density was 385.8 per square mile (149.0/km^{2}). 3.0% of housing units were vacant. The homeowner vacancy rate was 0.4%, and the rental vacancy rate was 8.3%.

Racial composition as of the 2020 census
Race	Number	Percent
White	1,256	96.3%
Black or African American	5	0.4%
American Indian and Alaska Native	0	0.0%
Asian	4	0.3%
Native Hawaiian and Other Pacific Islander	0	0.0%
Some other race	0	0.0%
Two or more races	39	3.0%
Hispanic or Latino (of any race)	15	1.2%

=== 2010 census ===
As of the census of 2010, there were 1,209 people, 475 households, and 365 families residing in the city. The population density was 863.6 inhabitants per square mile (333.4/km^{2}). There were 497 housing units at an average density of 355.0 per square mile (137.1/km^{2}). The racial makeup of the city was 98.8% White, 0.2% African American, 0.2% Asian, 0.1% from other races, and 0.6% from two or more races. Hispanic or Latino of any race were 1.2% of the population.

There were 475 households, of which 33.9% had children under the age of 18 living with them, 66.7% were married couples living together, 7.8% had a female householder with no husband present, 2.3% had a male householder with no wife present, and 23.2% were non-families. 19.4% of all households were made up of individuals, and 8% had someone living alone who was 65 years of age or older. The average household size was 2.55 and the average family size was 2.94.

The median age in the city was 42.1 years. 26.3% of residents were under the age of 18; 6.2% were between the ages of 18 and 24; 22% were from 25 to 44; 29.6% were from 45 to 64; and 16% were 65 years of age or older. The gender makeup of the city was 50.0% male and 50.0% female.

=== 2000 census ===
As of the census of 2000, there were 944 people, 379 households, and 275 families residing in the city. The population density was 723.5 inhabitants per square mile (279.3/km^{2}). There were 393 housing units at an average density of 301.2 per square mile (116.3/km^{2}). The racial makeup of the city was 99.62% White, 1.21% African American, 0.32% Asian, and 0.85% from two or more races. Hispanic or Latino of any race were 0.21% of the population.

There were 379 households, out of which 33.0% had children under the age of 18 living with them, 63.6% were married couples living together, 6.3% had a female householder with no husband present, and 27.2% were non-families. 24.5% of all households were made up of individuals, and 10.6% had someone living alone who was 65 years of age or older. The average household size was 2.49 and the average family size was 2.97.

Age spread: 25.7% under the age of 18, 8.2% from 18 to 24, 26.9% from 25 to 44, 24.9% from 45 to 64, and 14.3% who were 65 years of age or older. The median age was 38 years. For every 100 females, there were 99.2 males. For every 100 females age 18 and over, there were 95.8 males.

The median income for a household in the city was $65,750, and the median income for a family was $55,518. Males had a median income of $45,000 versus $28,321 for females. The per capita income for the city was $20,532. About 2.2% of families and 4.7% of the population were below the poverty line, including 6.1% of those under age 18 and 3.3% of those age 65 or over.

== Education ==
Dike–New Hartford Community School District is the local school district. It was established on July 1, 1996, by the merger of the Dike and New Hartford school districts.

== Notable people ==
- Patrick A. Murphy, Adjutant General of New York
