= Grundy Center, Iowa =

- City
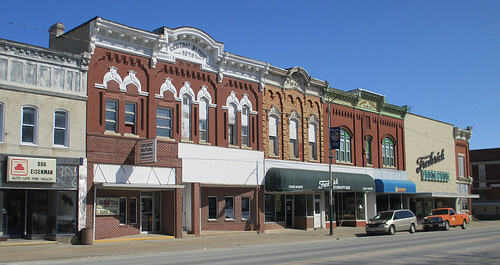
- Historic Downtown Grundy Center
- Motto: "The Good Life"
- Location of Grundy Center, Iowa
- Coordinates: 42°22′12″N 92°46′07″W
- Country: United States
- State: Iowa
- County: Grundy
- Township: Palermo
- Incorporated: April 17, 1877

Area
  - Total: 2.57 sq mi (6.66 km^{2})
  - Land: 2.57 sq mi (6.66 km^{2})
  - Water: 0 sq mi (0.00 km^{2})
- Elevation: 1,017 ft (310 m)

Population (2020)
  - Total: 2,796
  - Density: 1,088/sq mi (420.1/km^{2})
- Time zone: UTC-6 (Central (CST))
  - Summer (DST): UTC-5 (CDT)
- ZIP code: 50638
- Area code: 319
- FIPS code: 19-33195
- GNIS feature ID: 2394256
- Website: grundycenter.com

Grundy Center is a city in Palermo Township, Grundy County, Iowa, United States. The population was 2,796 at the time of the 2020 census, a 7.7% increase from 2,596 at the 2000 census. Grundy Center is also the county seat of Grundy County. Grundy Center is part of the Waterloo-Cedar Falls metropolitan area.

== Places of interest ==
Often simply called "Grundy", the town has three public education centers. Kindergarten through fourth grade is in the primary building, while grade levels 5-12 are located at the Jr-Sr High School. The community preschool is located in the former middle school building just next to the current primary building. The YMCA and early childhood center also share that building. The city of Grundy Center also has three public parks, Bel Pre, Orion, and Liberty Park. Located just south of the Liberty Park is the city swimming pool, that is open only in the summer months. The Herbert Quick School House is a historic building in Grundy Center, located within Orion city park.

== History ==
Grundy Center was incorporated on April 17, 1877, and was named for the county, which was named for Felix Grundy, congressman and senator from Tennessee.

Grundy Center had a bitcoin mining facility, which opened in 2020 and its 1,700 crypto-mining computers used "more electricity than all the town’s homes combined". It was destroyed in a fire in January 2025.

On April 9, 2021, Grundy Center was the site of a nearly six-hour long standoff when resident Michael Lang barricaded himself inside his home after assaulting an officer during a traffic stop near the town. Police surrounded his house and entered it in an attempt to arrest him. Lang fired at the entry team with a shotgun, fatally striking 27-year Iowa State Patrol officer Jim Smith, who was the first Iowa state trooper killed by gunfire since Oran Pape in 1936. Police drove an armored vehicle through the house several hours later, which Lang also fired at. Officers returned fire, nonfatally striking him twice, before arresting him. Lang was sentenced to life in prison without parole the following year. He had previously ran for sheriff of Grundy County in 2020, winning more than a fifth of the county's votes.

== Education ==
Grundy Center Community School District operates area public schools. In 2023, Grundy Center Middle School was recognized by the U.S. Department of Education as a Blue Ribbon School winner. Grundy Center Middle School is recognized as an Iowa High Performing School in a number of federal and state performance measures.

== Athletics ==
Since 2019, the Spartans have made five consecutive state title-game appearances and have won two state championships over the past two years, last year's was in Class A before moving up to 1A in 2023. In 2023, Grundy Center Freshman Judd Jirovsky made history in Iowa High School golf with an impressive state performance. During the first round, Jirovsky shot an incredible 8 under par 63, followed by a 3 under par 68, earning him the 2A State medalist honors. This outstanding achievement set an all-class record of 11 under par 131. In addition to Jirovsky's individual victory, the Grundy Center boys' team also took home the Class 2A State title, with a record-breaking score of 597. This marks the fourth State team title for the Spartans in school history. Also in 2023, the girls' golf team from Grundy Center won the 15th overall state championship, with Abbie Lindeman taking the individual medalist title.

== Geography ==
According to the United States Census Bureau, the city has a total area of 2.53 square miles (6.55 km^{2}), all land.

=== Climate ===
According to the Köppen Climate Classification system, Grundy Center has a hot-summer humid continental climate, abbreviated "Dfa" on climate maps.

Climate data for Grundy Center, Iowa, 1991–2020 normals, extremes 1893–present
Month	Jan	Feb	Mar	Apr	May	Jun	Jul	Aug	Sep	Oct	Nov	Dec	Year
Record high °F (°C)	66 (19)	70 (21)	89 (32)	96 (36)	106 (41)	106 (41)	107 (42)	108 (42)	101 (38)	94 (34)	80 (27)	73 (23)	108 (42)
Mean maximum °F (°C)	46.9 (8.3)	52.3 (11.3)	70.1 (21.2)	81.6 (27.6)	87.9 (31.1)	91.9 (33.3)	92.5 (33.6)	90.8 (32.7)	89.4 (31.9)	83.4 (28.6)	67.8 (19.9)	52.6 (11.4)	94.2 (34.6)
Mean daily maximum °F (°C)	26.1 (−3.3)	30.7 (−0.7)	44.1 (6.7)	58.7 (14.8)	70.4 (21.3)	80.0 (26.7)	82.9 (28.3)	80.9 (27.2)	75.1 (23.9)	61.9 (16.6)	45.4 (7.4)	32.1 (0.1)	57.4 (14.1)
Daily mean °F (°C)	17.4 (−8.1)	21.7 (−5.7)	34.2 (1.2)	47.1 (8.4)	59.3 (15.2)	69.7 (20.9)	72.7 (22.6)	70.2 (21.2)	62.8 (17.1)	50.2 (10.1)	35.8 (2.1)	23.6 (−4.7)	47.1 (8.4)
Mean daily minimum °F (°C)	8.7 (−12.9)	12.7 (−10.7)	24.3 (−4.3)	35.5 (1.9)	48.3 (9.1)	59.5 (15.3)	62.4 (16.9)	59.6 (15.3)	50.6 (10.3)	38.4 (3.6)	26.2 (−3.2)	15.1 (−9.4)	36.8 (2.7)
Mean minimum °F (°C)	−14.3 (−25.7)	−9.3 (−22.9)	2.1 (−16.6)	21.2 (−6.0)	33.4 (0.8)	46.4 (8.0)	51.0 (10.6)	49.2 (9.6)	35.6 (2.0)	22.5 (−5.3)	9.1 (−12.7)	−6.2 (−21.2)	−18.0 (−27.8)
Record low °F (°C)	−32 (−36)	−34 (−37)	−28 (−33)	−1 (−18)	20 (−7)	35 (2)	40 (4)	37 (3)	20 (−7)	−5 (−21)	−14 (−26)	−27 (−33)	−34 (−37)
Average precipitation inches (mm)	0.83 (21)	0.98 (25)	1.88 (48)	3.88 (99)	4.89 (124)	5.65 (144)	4.43 (113)	4.80 (122)	3.28 (83)	2.88 (73)	1.88 (48)	1.44 (37)	36.82 (937)
Average snowfall inches (cm)	9.2 (23)	5.9 (15)	3.9 (9.9)	1.4 (3.6)	0.0 (0.0)	0.0 (0.0)	0.0 (0.0)	0.0 (0.0)	0.0 (0.0)	0.3 (0.76)	2.1 (5.3)	9.5 (24)	32.3 (81.56)
Average precipitation days (≥ 0.01 in)	5.5	5.8	6.8	10.3	11.6	11.2	8.6	8.9	8.0	7.9	6.5	6.5	97.6
Average snowy days (≥ 0.1 in)	4.9	4.3	2.2	0.8	0.0	0.0	0.0	0.0	0.0	0.2	1.5	4.7	18.6
Source 1: NOAA
Source 2: National Weather Service

== Demographics ==
Historical population
Year	Pop.	±%
1880	950	—
1890	1,161	+22.2%
1900	1,322	+13.9%
1910	1,354	+2.4%
1920	1,749	+29.2%
1930	1,793	+2.5%
1940	2,012	+12.2%
1950	2,135	+6.1%
1960	2,403	+12.6%
1970	2,712	+12.9%
1980	2,880	+6.2%
1990	2,491	−13.5%
2000	2,596	+4.2%
2010	2,706	+4.2%
2020	2,796	+3.3%
Source: "U.S. Census website". United States Census Bureau. Source: U.S. Decennial Census

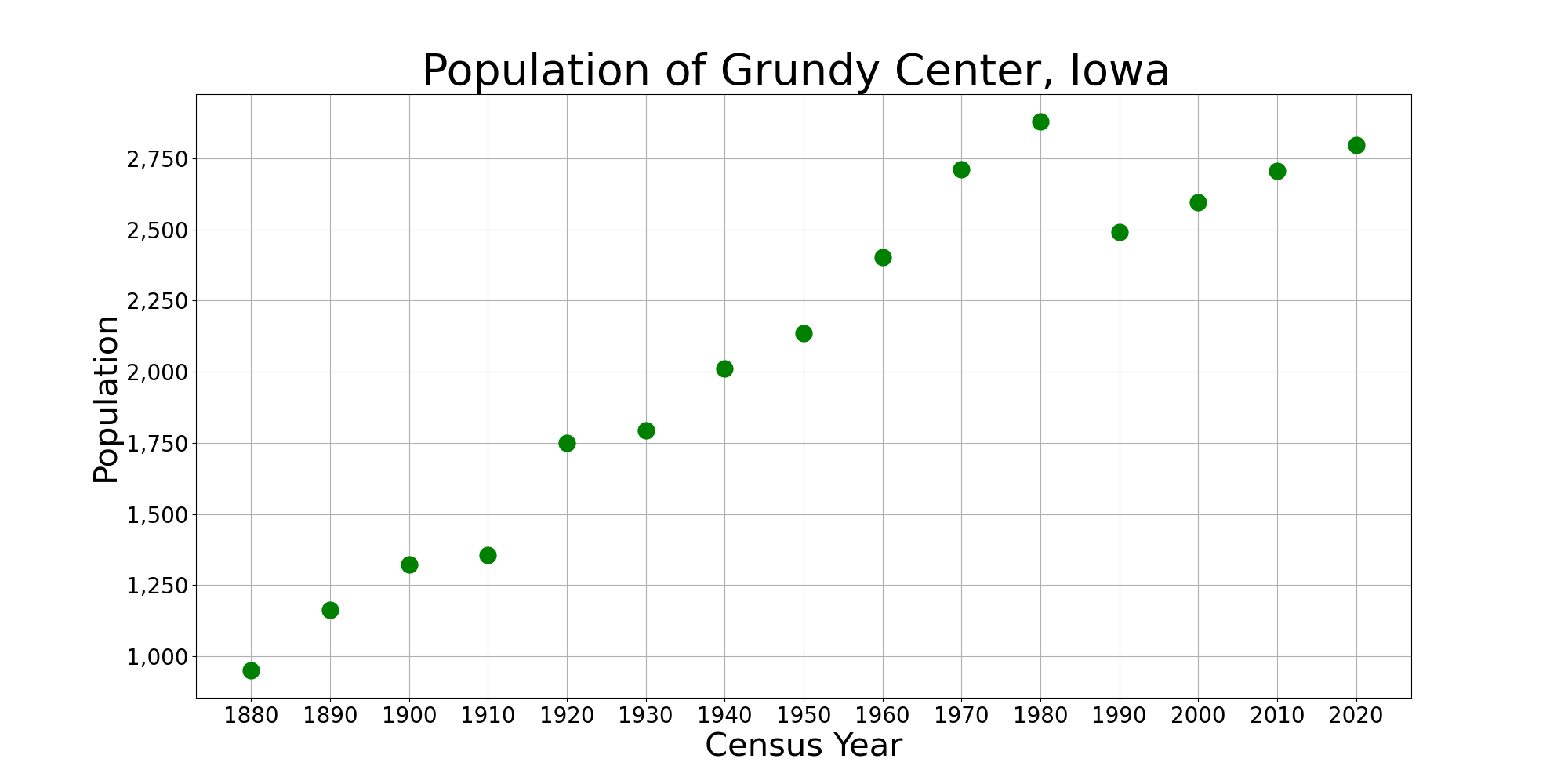
The population of Grundy Center, Iowa from US census data

=== 2020 census ===
As of the 2020 census, there were 2,796 people, 1,201 households, and 757 families residing in the city. The population density was 1,088.1 inhabitants per square mile (420.1/km^{2}). There were 1,281 housing units at an average density of 498.5 per square mile (192.5/km^{2}).

Of the 1,201 households, 27.6% had children under the age of 18 living with them, 49.0% were married couples living together, 6.3% were cohabitating couples, 30.1% had a female householder with no spouse or partner present, and 14.6% had a male householder with no spouse or partner present. 37.0% of all households were non-families. 33.0% of all households were made up of individuals, and 18.0% had someone living alone who was 65 years old or older. Of housing units, 6.2% were vacant. The homeowner vacancy rate was 1.1% and the rental vacancy rate was 4.7%.

The median age in the city was 42.0 years. 23.1% of residents were under the age of 18, 4.3% were between the ages of 20 and 24, 23.7% were from 25 to 44, 22.1% were from 45 to 64, and 24.6% were 65 years of age or older. For every 100 females there were 87.8 males, and for every 100 females age 18 and over there were 83.4 males age 18 and over. 0.0% of residents lived in urban areas, while 100.0% lived in rural areas.

Racial composition as of the 2020 census
Race	Number	Percent
White	2,681	95.9%
Black or African American	17	0.6%
American Indian and Alaska Native	5	0.2%
Asian	10	0.4%
Native Hawaiian and Other Pacific Islander	0	0.0%
Some other race	11	0.4%
Two or more races	72	2.6%
Hispanic or Latino (of any race)	34	1.2%

=== 2010 census ===
At the 2010 census there were 2,706 people in 1,162 households, including 739 families, in the city. The population density was 1,069.6 inhabitants per square mile (413.0/km^{2}). There were 1,256 housing units at an average density of 496.4 per square mile (191.7/km^{2}). The racial makup of the city was 98.6% White, 0.2% African American, 0.1% Asian, 0.1% Pacific Islander, and 1.0% from two or more races. Hispanic or Latino of any race were 0.4%.

Of the 1,162 households 29.4% had children under the age of 18 living with them, 51.8% were married couples living together, 8.8% had a female householder with no husband present, 3.0% had a male householder with no wife present, and 36.4% were non-families. 32.4% of households were one person and 17.1% were one person aged 65 or older. The average household size was 2.26 and the average family size was 2.86.

The median age was 42.9 years. 22.9% of residents were under the age of 18; 6% were between the ages of 18 and 24; 23.1% were from 25 to 44; 25.3% were from 45 to 64; and 22.7% were 65 or older. The gender makeup of the city was 46.3% male and 53.7% female.

=== 2000 census ===
At the 2000 census there were 2,596 people in 1,103 households, including 737 families, in the city. The population density was 1,058.9 inhabitants per square mile (408.8/km^{2}). There were 1,176 housing units at an average density of 479.7 per square mile (185.2/km^{2}). The racial makup of the city was 99.23% White, 0.04% African American, 0.15% Asian, and 0.58% from two or more races. Hispanic or Latino of any race were 0.54%.

Of the 1,103 households 26.7% had children under the age of 18 living with them, 57.8% were married couples living together, 7.0% had a female householder with no husband present, and 33.1% were non-families. 30.5% of households were one person and 18.6% were one person aged 65 or older. The average household size was 2.27 and the average family size was 2.83.

22.4% are under the age of 18, 6.2% from 18 to 24, 22.9% from 25 to 44, 23.0% from 45 to 64, and 25.5% 65 or older. The median age was 44 years. For every 100 females, there were 85.8 males. For every 100 females age 18 and over, there were 81.0 males.

The median household income was $37,222 and the median family income was $46,223. Males had a median income of $32,414 versus $23,788 for females. The per capita income for the city was $18,859. About 3.8% of families and 4.5% of the population were below the poverty line, including 2.0% of those under age 18 and 7.4% of those age 65 or over.

== Media ==
The Grundy Register was formed in 1923, and is a weekly newspaper published in Grundy Center.

== Notable people ==
- Elisha Avery Crary (1905–1978), United States district judge
- Joe Crisman (born 1971), football guard/center for the Tampa Bay Buccaneers
- T. Cooper Evans (1924–2005), U.S. representative from Iowa
- Ziggy Hasbrook (1893–1976), professional baseball player for the Chicago White Sox
- Daniel Kerr (1836–1916), U.S. representative from Iowa
- W. L. Mooty (1906–1992), lieutenant governor of Iowa
- J. Morris Rea (1846–1895), Iowa state senator
- Clarence Slifer (1904–1993), Academy Award-winning American special effects artist
- Harvey Tschirgi (1908–2001), brigadier general with the U.S. Marine Corps
- Robert Hugh Willoughby (1921–2018), classical flautist

== See also ==
- Ziggy Hasbrook
- Herbert Quick
