= Stout, Iowa =

- City
- Location of Stout, Iowa
- Coordinates: 42°31′37″N 92°42′42″W
- Country: US
- State: Iowa
- County: Grundy

Area
  - Total: 0.29 sq mi (0.76 km^{2})
  - Land: 0.29 sq mi (0.76 km^{2})
  - Water: 0 sq mi (0.00 km^{2})
- Elevation: 1,024 ft (312 m)

Population (2020)
  - Total: 191
  - Density: 653.6/sq mi (252.37/km^{2})
- Time zone: UTC-6 (Central (CST))
  - Summer (DST): UTC-5 (CDT)
- ZIP code: 50673
- Area code: 319
- FIPS code: 19-75720
- GNIS feature ID: 2395978

Stout is a city in Grundy County, Iowa, United States. The population was 191 in the 2020 census, a decrease from the population of 217 in 2000. It is part of the Waterloo–Cedar Falls Metropolitan Statistical Area.

== History ==
A post office called Stout has been in operation since 1900. The city was named for A. V. Stout, the original owner of the town site.

== Geography ==
According to the United States Census Bureau, the city has a total area of 0.30 square miles (0.78 km^{2}), all land.

== Demographics ==
Historical population
| Census | Pop. | Note | %± |
|---|---|---|---|
| 1920 | 162 | | — |
| 1930 | 143 | | −11.7% |
| 1940 | 135 | | −5.6% |
| 1950 | 135 | | 0.0% |
| 1960 | 145 | | 7.4% |
| 1970 | 196 | | 35.2% |
| 1980 | 190 | | −3.1% |
| 1990 | 192 | | 1.1% |
| 2000 | 217 | | 13.0% |
| 2010 | 224 | | 3.2% |
| 2020 | 191 | | −14.7% |
U.S. Decennial Census

=== 2020 census ===
As of the census of 2020, there were 191 people, 76 households, and 60 families residing in the city. The population density was 653.6 inhabitants per square mile (252.4/km^{2}). There were 83 housing units at an average density of 284.0 per square mile (109.7/km^{2}). The racial makeup of the city was 96.3% White, 0.0% Black or African American, 0.0% Native American, 0.0% Asian, 0.0% Pacific Islander, 0.5% from other races and 3.1% from two or more races. Hispanic or Latino persons of any race comprised 1.6% of the population.

Of the 76 households, 38.2% of which had children under the age of 18 living with them, 68.4% were married couples living together, 6.6% were cohabitating couples, 10.5% had a female householder with no spouse or partner present and 14.5% had a male householder with no spouse or partner present. 21.1% of all households were non-families. 15.8% of all households were made up of individuals, 9.2% had someone living alone who was 65 years old or older.

The median age in the city was 39.4 years. 28.8% of the residents were under the age of 20; 1.0% were between the ages of 20 and 24; 28.8% were from 25 and 44; 27.2% were from 45 and 64; and 14.1% were 65 years of age or older. The gender makeup of the city was 54.5% male and 45.5% female.

=== 2010 census ===
As of the census of 2010, there were 224 people, 80 households, and 65 families residing in the city. The population density was 746.7 inhabitants per square mile (288.3/km^{2}). There were 84 housing units at an average density of 280.0 per square mile (108.1/km^{2}). The racial makeup of the city was 99.6% White and 0.4% Asian. Hispanic or Latino of any race were 0.9% of the population.

There were 80 households, of which 37.5% had children under the age of 18 living with them, 68.8% were married couples living together, 8.8% had a female householder with no husband present, 3.8% had a male householder with no wife present, and 18.8% were non-families. 17.5% of all households were made up of individuals, and 10.1% had someone living alone who was 65 years of age or older. The average household size was 2.80 and the average family size was 3.14.

The median age in the city was 37.2 years. 25.4% of residents were under the age of 18; 8.6% were between the ages of 18 and 24; 28.6% were from 25 to 44; 25.4% were from 45 to 64; and 12.1% were 65 years of age or older. The gender makeup of the city was 51.8% male and 48.2% female.

=== 2000 census ===
As of the census of 2000, there were 217 people, 75 households, and 60 families residing in the city. The population density was 697.3 inhabitants per square mile (269.2/km^{2}). There were 77 housing units at an average density of 247.4 per square mile (95.5/km^{2}). The racial makeup of the city was 99.08% White, and 0.92% from two or more races.

There were 75 households, out of which 37.3% had children under the age of 18 living with them, 68.0% were married couples living together, 9.3% had a female householder with no husband present, and 18.7% were non-families. 14.7% of all households were made up of individuals, and 9.3% had someone living alone who was 65 years of age or older. The average household size was 2.89 and the average family size was 3.23.

In the city, the population was spread out, with 31.3% under the age of 18, 8.8% from 18 to 24, 26.7% from 25 to 44, 18.0% from 45 to 64, and 15.2% who were 65 years of age or older. The median age was 34 years. For every 100 females, there were 104.7 males. For every 100 females age 18 and over, there were 101.4 males.

The median income for a household in the city was $40,781, and the median income for a family was $41,042. Males had a median income of $28,958 versus $23,750 for females. The per capita income for the city was $12,504. About 8.5% of families and 12.5% of the population were below the poverty line, including 22.0% of those under the age of eighteen and none of those 65 or over.

== Education ==
Dike–New Hartford Community School District is the local school district. It was established on July 1, 1996, by the merger of the Dike and New Hartford school districts.
