= Fairbank, Iowa =

City in Iowa, United States

- City
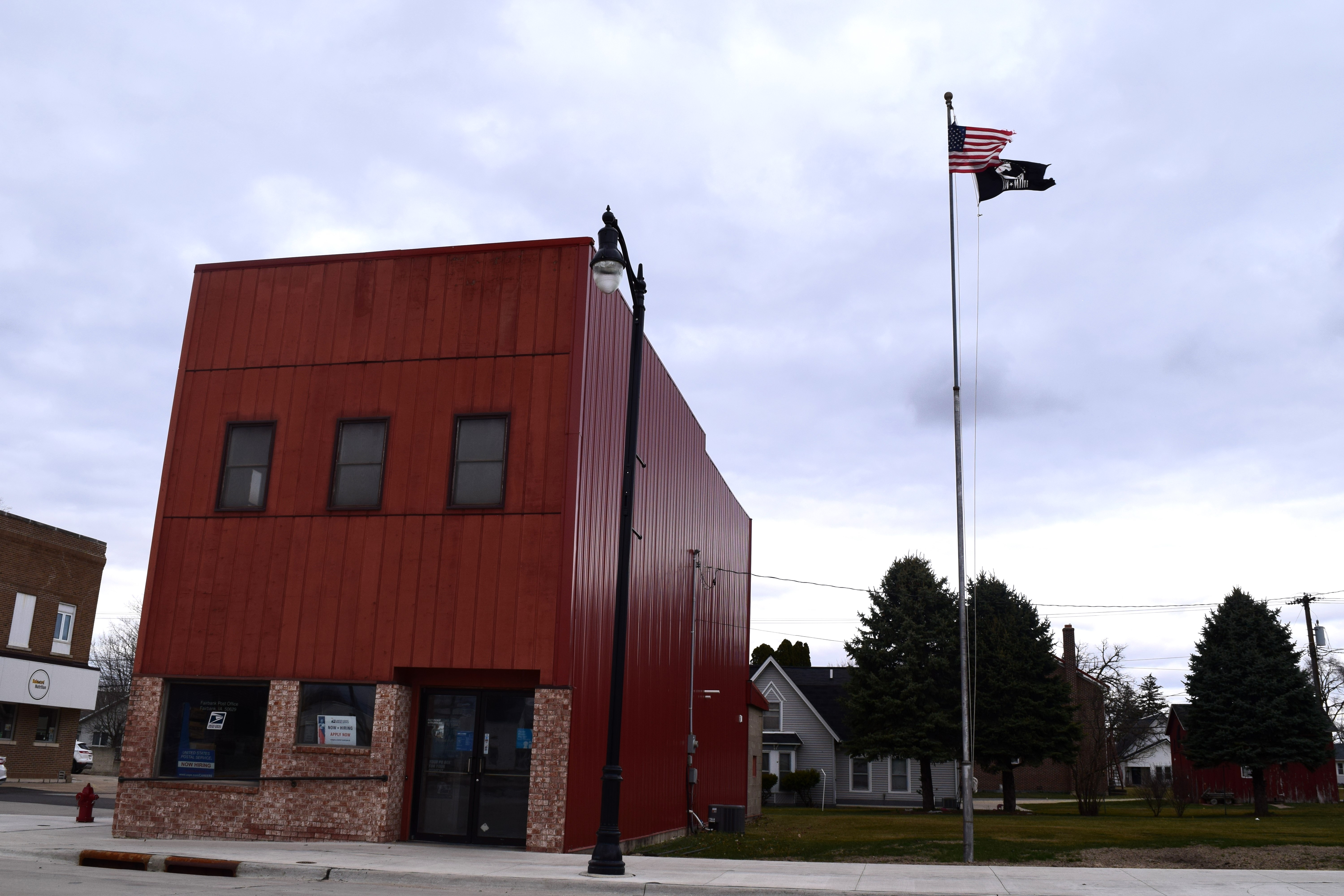
- Fairbank post office

- Location of Fairbank, Iowa
- Coordinates: 42°38′24″N 92°02′52″W
- Country: United States
- State: Iowa
- Counties: Buchanan, Fayette
- Incorporated: May 12, 1891

Area
  - Total: 0.75 sq mi (1.95 km^{2})
  - Land: 0.73 sq mi (1.90 km^{2})
  - Water: 0.019 sq mi (0.05 km^{2})
- Elevation: 984 ft (300 m)

Population (2020)
  - Total: 1,111
  - Density: 1,511.0/sq mi (583.41/km^{2})
- Time zone: UTC-6 (Central (CST))
  - Summer (DST): UTC-5 (CDT)
- ZIP code: 50629
- Area code: 319
- FIPS code: 19-26355
- GNIS feature ID: 2394725

Fairbank is a city in Buchanan and Fayette counties in the U.S. state of Iowa. The population was 1,111 at the time of the 2020 census.

== History ==
The first recorded permanent Euro-American settlement in what became Fairbank Township was established in 1849 by William S. Clark. In 1853, F. J. Everett and C. W. Bacon arrived from New York and established a log cabin and sawmill along the Little Wapsipinicon River. In 1854, they laid out the village of Fairbank, naming it after Bacon's grandmother, whose surname was Fairbank.

A post office was established in 1854, with Bacon serving as the first postmaster. John McCuniff opened the village's first store in 1855, using lumber produced at Everett and Bacon's sawmill. Frederick Patterson subsequently established an addition to the original village, known as Patterson's Addition.

The community developed around agriculture, milling, and trade. A flour mill was constructed along the river in the 1850s, and creameries became important to the area's agricultural economy. Early settlers included people of German and Irish descent, and several religious congregations were established during the nineteenth century.

Fairbank residents voted to incorporate the community on April 23, 1891, and the first municipal elections were held on May 5. J. C. Myers became the city's first mayor. The railroad contributed to the community's subsequent development as an agricultural trading and shipping center.

== Geography ==
According to the United States Census Bureau, the city has a total area of 0.73 square miles (1.89 km^{2}), of which 0.71 square miles (1.84 km^{2}) is land and 0.02 square miles (0.05 km^{2}) is water.

== Parks and recreation ==
=== Island Park ===
Island Park is a public park located on an island in the Little Wapsipinicon River in Fairbank. The park is accessible by a pedestrian suspension bridge and contains a picnic shelter, playground equipment, and other recreational facilities.

The island was originally associated with the town's early milling operations. A pontoon bridge provided access around the beginning of the twentieth century, and a hanging footbridge was constructed in 1920. On May 16, 1938, members of the Phelps family transferred ownership of the island to the American Legion, which conveyed it to the town of Fairbank for use as a public park.

A new pedestrian bridge was constructed in 1940, and the island gradually developed into a community recreation area. Island Park became a recognizable local landmark and has been associated with public gatherings and community celebrations.

== Demographics ==
Historical populations
| Year | Pop. | ±% |
|---|---|---|
| 1880 | 223 | — |
| 1890 | 448 | +100.9% |
| 1900 | 644 | +43.8% |
| 1910 | 618 | −4.0% |
| 1920 | 657 | +6.3% |
| 1930 | 629 | −4.3% |
| 1940 | 631 | +0.3% |
| 1950 | 653 | +3.5% |
| 1960 | 650 | −0.5% |
| 1970 | 810 | +24.6% |
| 1980 | 980 | +21.0% |
| 1990 | 1,018 | +3.9% |
| 2000 | 1,041 | +2.3% |
| 2010 | 1,113 | +6.9% |
| 2020 | 1,111 | −0.2% |
Source:"U.S. Census website". United States Census Bureau. and Iowa Data Center; Source: U.S. Decennial Census

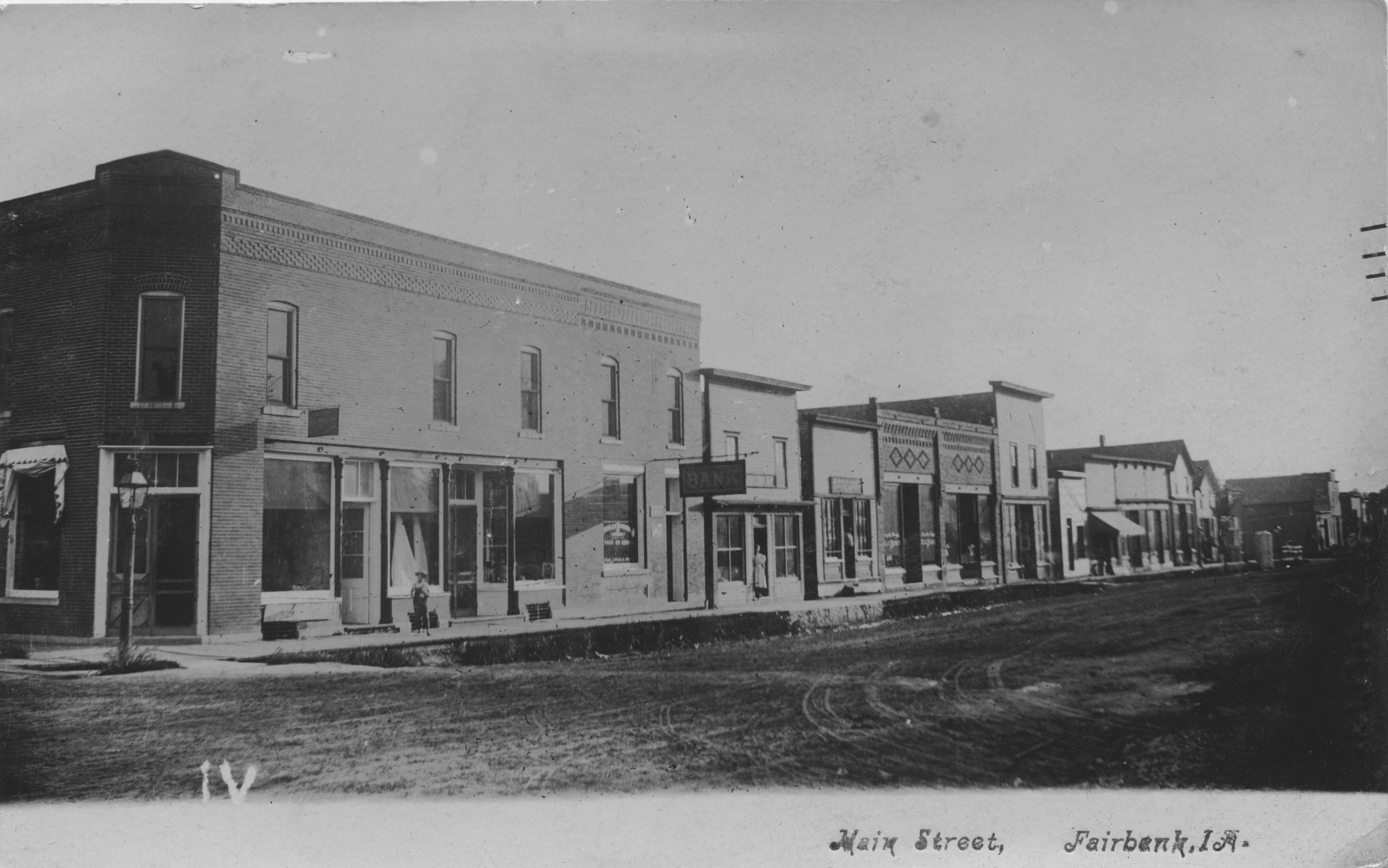
Main Street in 1885

=== 2020 census ===
As of the 2020 census, there were 1,111 people, 451 households, and 315 families residing in the city.

The population density was 1,511.0 inhabitants per square mile (583.4/km^{2}). There were 484 housing units at an average density of 658.3 per square mile (254.2/km^{2}), of which 6.8% were vacant. The homeowner vacancy rate was 1.6% and the rental vacancy rate was 8.0%.

The median age was 40.7 years. 25.0% of residents were under the age of 18, and 18.1% were 65 years of age or older. 27.3% of residents were under the age of 20; 3.7% were between the ages of 20 and 24; 24.6% were from 25 to 44; and 26.4% were from 45 to 64. The gender makeup of the city was 50.2% male and 49.8% female. For every 100 females there were 100.9 males, and for every 100 females age 18 and over there were 94.2 males age 18 and over.

Of the 451 households, 31.7% had children under the age of 18 living with them. Of all households, 57.4% were married-couple households, 6.7% were cohabiting-couple households, 14.4% were households with a male householder and no spouse or partner present, and 21.5% were households with a female householder and no spouse or partner present. 30.2% of all households were non-families. 26.2% of all households were made up of individuals, and 12.5% had someone living alone who was 65 years of age or older.

0.0% of residents lived in urban areas, while 100.0% lived in rural areas.

Racial composition as of the 2020 census
| Race | Number | Percent |
|---|---|---|
| White | 1,070 | 96.3% |
| Black or African American | 0 | 0.0% |
| American Indian and Alaska Native | 0 | 0.0% |
| Asian | 4 | 0.4% |
| Native Hawaiian and Other Pacific Islander | 0 | 0.0% |
| Some other race | 3 | 0.3% |
| Two or more races | 34 | 3.1% |
| Hispanic or Latino (of any race) | 17 | 1.5% |

=== 2010 census ===
As of the census of 2010, there were 1,113 people, 461 households, and 307 families living in the city. The population density was 1,567.6 inhabitants per square mile (605.3/km^{2}). There were 498 housing units at an average density of 701.4 per square mile (270.8/km^{2}). The racial makeup of the city was 98.0% White, 0.3% African American, 0.1% Native American, 0.4% from other races, and 1.3% from two or more races. Hispanic or Latino of any race were 1.8% of the population.

There were 461 households, of which 32.3% had children under the age of 18 living with them, 55.7% were married couples living together, 6.1% had a female householder with no husband present, 4.8% had a male householder with no wife present, and 33.4% were non-families. 27.5% of all households were made up of individuals, and 14.3% had someone living alone who was 65 years of age or older. The average household size was 2.41 and the average family size was 2.98.

The median age in the city was 37.6 years. 26.9% of residents were under the age of 18; 6% were between the ages of 18 and 24; 25.7% were from 25 to 44; 25.8% were from 45 to 64; and 15.5% were 65 years of age or older. The gender makeup of the city was 49.3% male and 50.7% female.

=== 2000 census ===
As of the census of 2000, there were 1,041 people, 418 households, and 290 families living in the city. The population density was 1,758.8 inhabitants per square mile (679.1/km^{2}). There were 436 housing units at an average density of 736.7 per square mile (284.4/km^{2}). The racial makeup of the city was 99.42% White, 0.10% African American, 0.10% Native American, 0.10% Asian, 0.19% from other races, and 0.10% from two or more races. 0.96% of the population was Hispanic or Latino of any race.

There were 418 households, out of which 34.2% had children under the age of 18 living with them, 58.9% were married couples living together, 7.2% had a female householder with no husband present, and 30.6% were non-families. 26.8% of all households were made up of individuals, and 13.9% had someone living alone who was 65 years of age or older. The average household size was 2.49 and the average family size was 3.03.

In the city, the population was spread out, with 28.1% under the age of 18, 6.9% from 18 to 24, 28.3% from 25 to 44, 21.8% from 45 to 64, and 14.8% who were 65 years of age or older. The median age was 37 years. For every 100 females, there were 95.3 males. For every 100 females age 18 and over, there were 87.9 males.

The median income for a household in the city was $36,900, and the median income for a family was $43,654. Males had a median income of $31,000 versus $23,333 for females. The per capita income for the city was $17,262. About 4.9% of families and 8.9% of the population were below the poverty line, including 12.0% of those under age 18 and 11.0% of those age 65 or over.

== Education ==
The Wapsie Valley Community School District operates local public schools. The community of Fairbank is served by Wapsie Valley High School.

== Notable people ==
- Chris Jans, former head men's basketball coach at New Mexico State University. Current head coach at Mississippi State.
