= Black Hawk Township, Grundy County, Iowa =

Township in Iowa, USA

Coordinates: 42°20′N 92°36′W

Black Hawk Township is a township in Grundy County, Iowa, United States.
