= Holland, Iowa =

- City
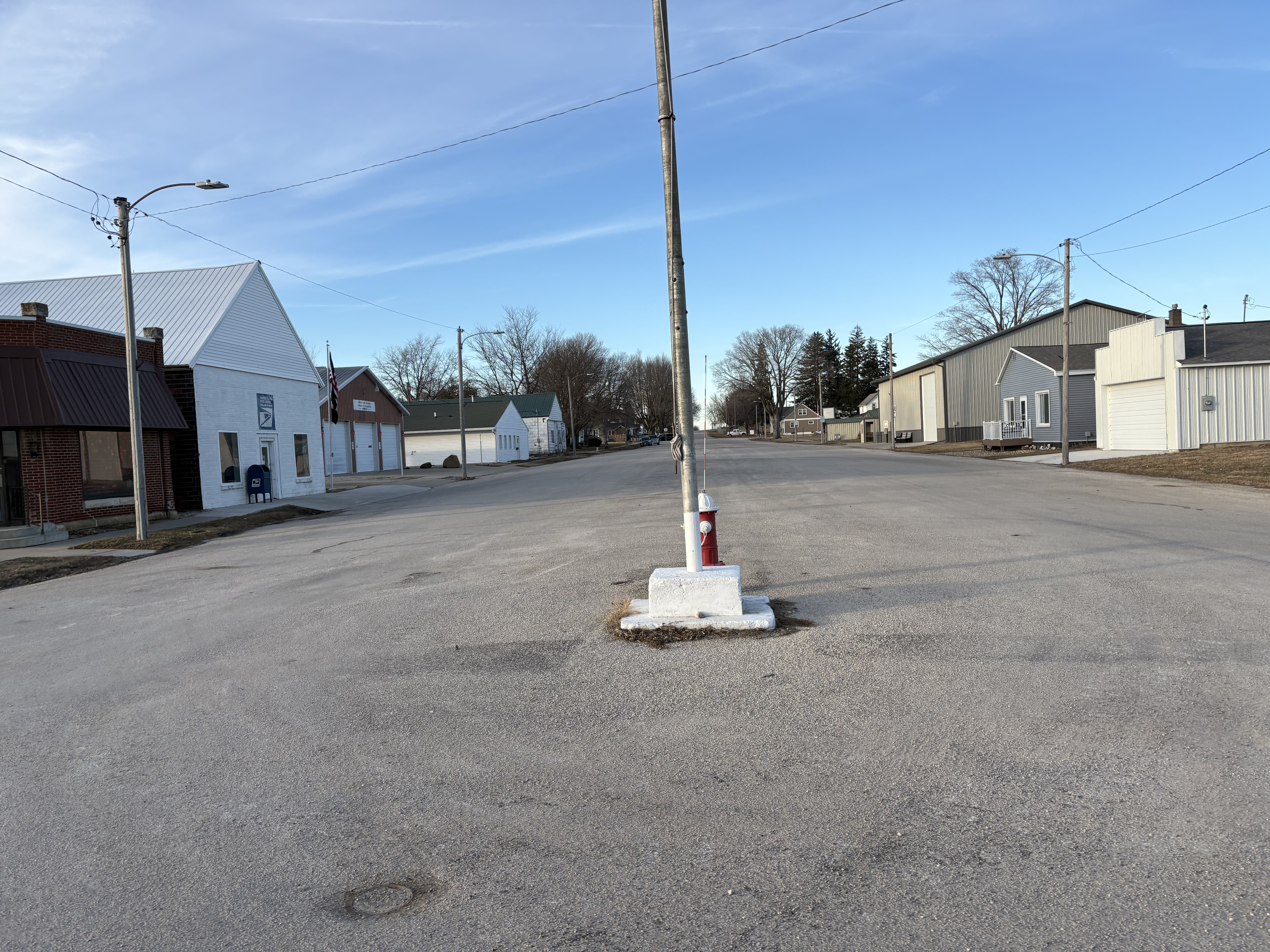
- Main Street in 2026

- Location of Holland, Iowa
- Coordinates: 42°24′00″N 92°47′56″W
- Country: USA
- State: Iowa
- County: Grundy

Area
  - Total: 0.25 sq mi (0.65 km^{2})
  - Land: 0.25 sq mi (0.65 km^{2})
  - Water: 0 sq mi (0.00 km^{2})
- Elevation: 1,004 ft (306 m)

Population (2020)
  - Total: 269
  - Density: 1,065.9/sq mi (411.54/km^{2})
- Time zone: UTC-6 (Central (CST))
  - Summer (DST): UTC-5 (CDT)
- ZIP code: 50642
- Area code: 319
- FIPS code: 19-36705
- GNIS feature ID: 2394401

Holland is a city in Grundy County, Iowa, United States. The population was 269 at the time of the 2020 census. It is part of the Waterloo–Cedar Falls Metropolitan Statistical Area.

== Geography ==
Holland is located at 42°23′59″N 92°47′58″W (42.399708, -92.799487).

According to the United States Census Bureau, the city has a total area of 0.25 square miles (0.65 km^{2}), all land.

== Demographics ==
Historical populations
Year	Pop.	±%
1880	252	—
1890	221	−12.3%
1900	175	−20.8%
1910	168	−4.0%
1920	165	−1.8%
1930	175	+6.1%
1940	202	+15.4%
1950	221	+9.4%
1960	264	+19.5%
1970	258	−2.3%
1980	278	+7.8%
1990	215	−22.7%
2000	250	+16.3%
2010	282	+12.8%
2020	269	−4.6%
Source:"U.S. Census website". United States Census Bureau. and Iowa Data Center; Source: U.S. Decennial Census

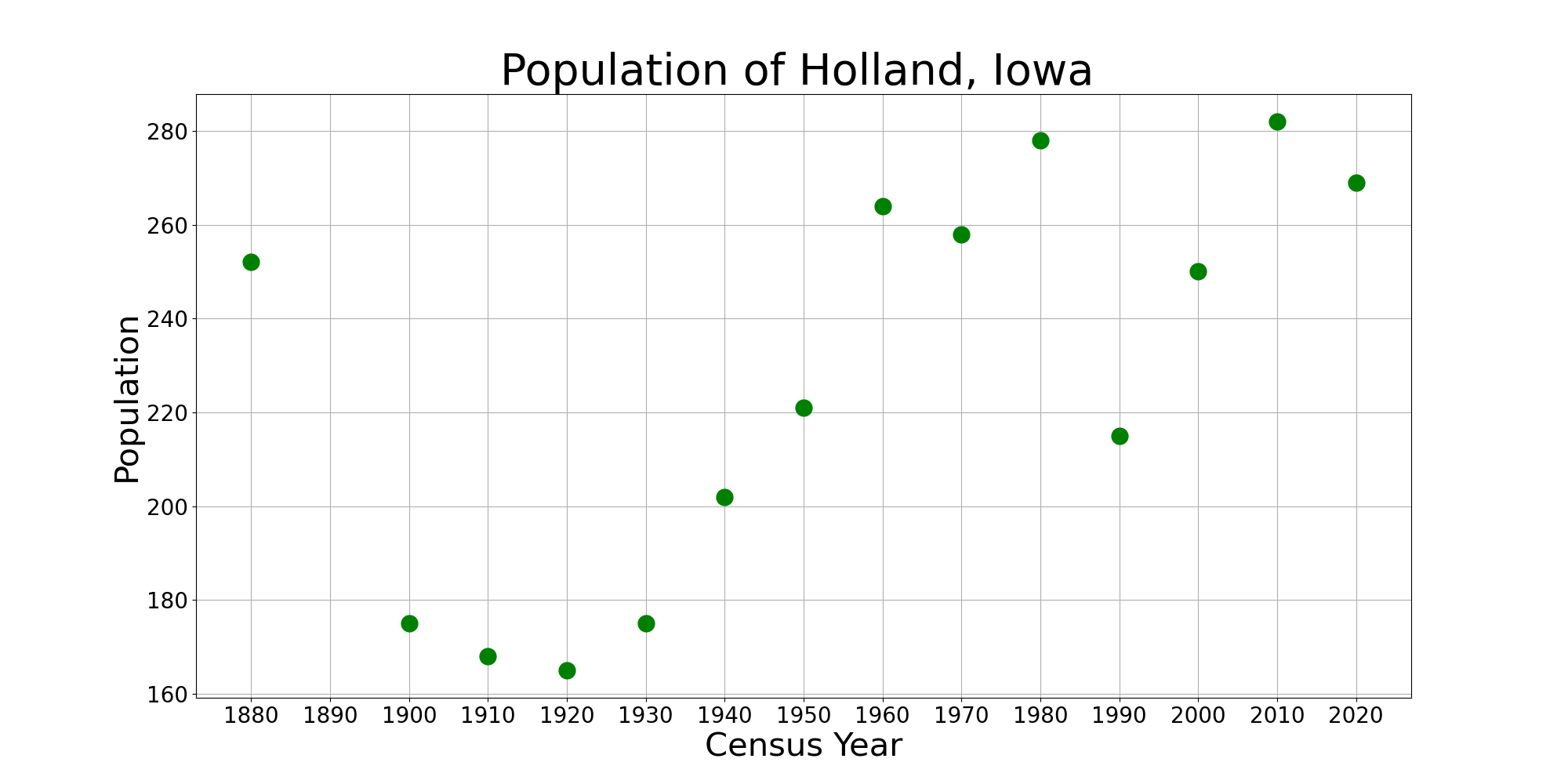
The population of Holland, Iowa from US census data

=== 2020 census ===
As of the census of 2020, there were 269 people, 113 households, and 83 families residing in the city. The population density was 1,065.9 inhabitants per square mile (411.5/km^{2}). There were 113 housing units at an average density of 447.8 per square mile (172.9/km^{2}). The racial makeup of the city was 95.2% White, 2.2% Black or African American, 0.0% Native American, 0.0% Asian, 0.0% Pacific Islander, 0.0% from other races and 2.6% from two or more races. Hispanic or Latino persons of any race comprised 0.4% of the population.

Of the 113 households, 36.3% of which had children under the age of 18 living with them, 59.3% were married couples living together, 11.5% were cohabitating couples, 16.8% had a female householder with no spouse or partner present and 12.4% had a male householder with no spouse or partner present. 26.5% of all households were non-families. 19.5% of all households were made up of individuals, 6.2% had someone living alone who was 65 years old or older.

The median age in the city was 39.4 years. 28.6% of the residents were under the age of 20; 2.2% were between the ages of 20 and 24; 24.5% were from 25 and 44; 28.3% were from 45 and 64; and 16.4% were 65 years of age or older. The gender makeup of the city was 48.7% male and 51.3% female.

=== 2010 census ===
As of the census of 2010, there were 282 people, 107 households, and 77 families living in the city. The population density was 1,128.0 inhabitants per square mile (435.5/km^{2}). There were 113 housing units at an average density of 452.0 per square mile (174.5/km^{2}). The racial makeup of the city was 99.6% White and 0.4% from two or more races.

There were 107 households, of which 34.6% had children under the age of 18 living with them, 59.8% were married couples living together, 4.7% had a female householder with no husband present, 7.5% had a male householder with no wife present, and 28.0% were non-families. 24.3% of all households were made up of individuals, and 13% had someone living alone who was 65 years of age or older. The average household size was 2.64 and the average family size was 3.12.

The median age in the city was 35.5 years. 29.1% of residents were under the age of 18; 6.8% were between the ages of 18 and 24; 28% were from 25 to 44; 21.6% were from 45 to 64; and 14.5% were 65 years of age or older. The gender makeup of the city was 51.4% male and 48.6% female.

=== 2000 census ===
As of the census of 2000, there were 250 people, 105 households, and 76 families living in the city. The population density was 1,001.5 inhabitants per square mile (386.7/km^{2}). There were 109 housing units at an average density of 436.7 per square mile (168.6/km^{2}). The racial makeup of the city was 99.60% White and 0.40% Asian.

There were 105 households, out of which 30.5% had children under the age of 18 living with them, 68.6% were married couples living together, 3.8% had a female householder with no husband present, and 27.6% were non-families. 25.7% of all households were made up of individuals, and 17.1% had someone living alone who was 65 years of age or older. The average household size was 2.38 and the average family size was 2.87.

In the city, the population was spread out, with 23.2% under the age of 18, 4.4% from 18 to 24, 27.6% from 25 to 44, 20.0% from 45 to 64, and 24.8% who were 65 years of age or older. The median age was 41 years. For every 100 females, there were 81.2 males. For every 100 females age 18 and over, there were 84.6 males.

The median income for a household in the city was $34,886, and the median income for a family was $38,125. Males had a median income of $29,375 versus $20,250 for females. The per capita income for the city was $15,370. About 7.5% of families and 6.3% of the population were below the poverty line, including 8.3% of those under the age of eighteen and 17.3% of those 65 or over.

== Education ==
Grundy Center Community School District operates area public schools.
