= Palermo Township, Grundy County, Iowa =

Township in Grundy County, Iowa, United States

Coordinates: 42°20′N 92°50′W

Palermo Township is a township in Grundy County, Iowa, United States.
