= Grundy County, Iowa =

County in Iowa, United States

- County
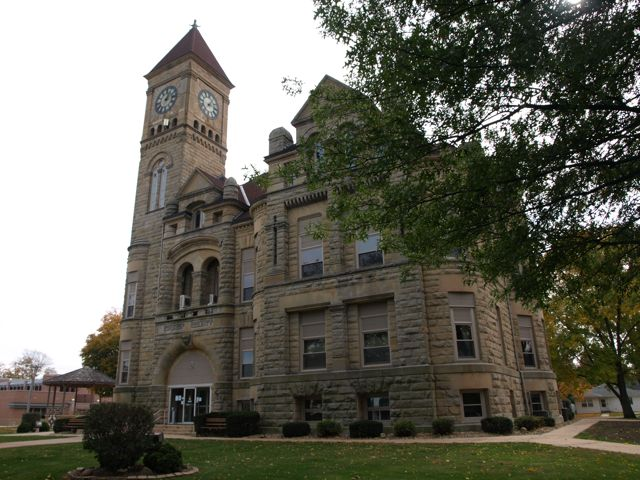
- The Grundy County Courthouse in Grundy Center

- Location within the U.S. state of Iowa
- Coordinates: 42°24′12″N 92°47′25″W
- Country: United States
- State: Iowa
- Created: January 15, 1851
- Organized: December 25, 1856
- Named for: Felix Grundy
- Seat: Grundy Center
- Largest city: Grundy Center

Area
  - Total: 501.891 sq mi (1,299.89 km^{2})
  - Land: 501.855 sq mi (1,299.80 km^{2})
  - Water: 0.036 sq mi (0.093 km^{2}) 0.01%

Population (2020)
  - Total: 12,329
  - Estimate (2025): 12,361 ▲
  - Density: 24.567/sq mi (9.4853/km^{2})
- Time zone: UTC−6 (Central)
  - Summer (DST): UTC−5 (CDT)
- Area code: 319
- Congressional district: 2nd
- Website: grundycountyiowa.gov
- Iowa county number 38

Grundy County is a county located in the U.S. state of Iowa. At the 2020 census, the population was 12,329, and was estimated to be 12,361 in 2025. The county seat and the largest city is Grundy Center. The county is named for Felix Grundy, former U.S. Attorney General.

Grundy County is included in the Waterloo–Cedar Falls metropolitan area.

== History ==
Grundy County was formed on January 15, 1851, and became self-governing in 1856. It was named after Felix Grundy, a U.S. Senator and Representative from Tennessee and a former U.S. Attorney General under President Martin Van Buren.

The first courthouse was built in 1861. The wooden, two-story building contained a courtroom, but was used for other purposes, including housing the office of the sheriff, county treasurer, the judge, as well as a chamber for the jury. The cornerstone for a second courthouse was laid on November 11, 1891.

== Geography ==
According to the United States Census Bureau, the county has a total area of 501.891 square miles (1,299.89 km^{2}), of which 501.855 square miles (1,299.80 km^{2}) is land and 0.036 square miles (0.093 km^{2}) (0.01%) is water. It is the 71st largest county in Iowa by total area.

=== Major highways ===
- U.S. Highway 20
- Iowa Highway 14
- Iowa Highway 57
- Iowa Highway 175

=== Adjacent counties ===
- Butler County (north)
- Black Hawk County (east)
- Tama County (southeast)
- Marshall County (southwest)
- Hardin County (west)
- Franklin County (northwest)

== Demographics ==
Historical population
Census	Pop.	Note	%±
1860	793		—
1870	6,399		706.9%
1880	12,639		97.5%
1890	13,215		4.6%
1900	13,757		4.1%
1910	13,574		−1.3%
1920	14,420		6.2%
1930	14,133		−2.0%
1940	13,518		−4.4%
1950	13,722		1.5%
1960	14,132		3.0%
1970	14,119		−0.1%
1980	14,366		1.7%
1990	12,029		−16.3%
2000	12,369		2.8%
2010	12,453		0.7%
2020	12,329		−1.0%
2025 (est.)	12,361	▲	0.3%
U.S. Decennial Census; 1790–1960 1900–1990; 1990–2000 2010–2020

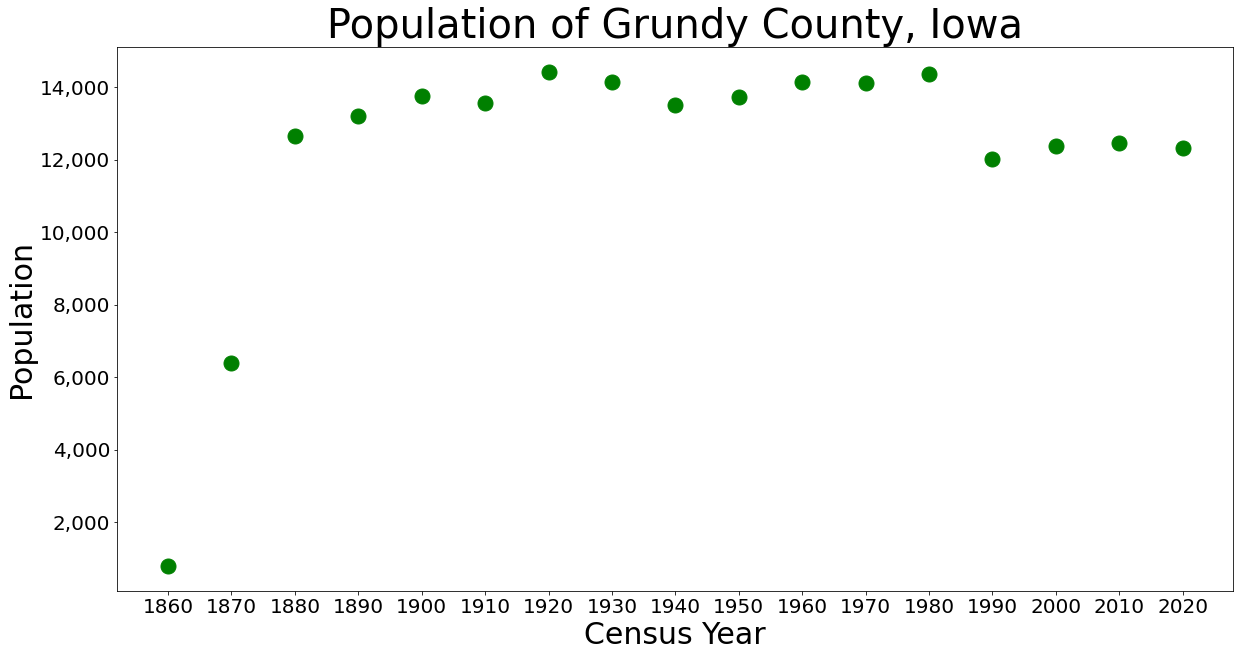
Population of Grundy County from US census data

=== 2020 census ===
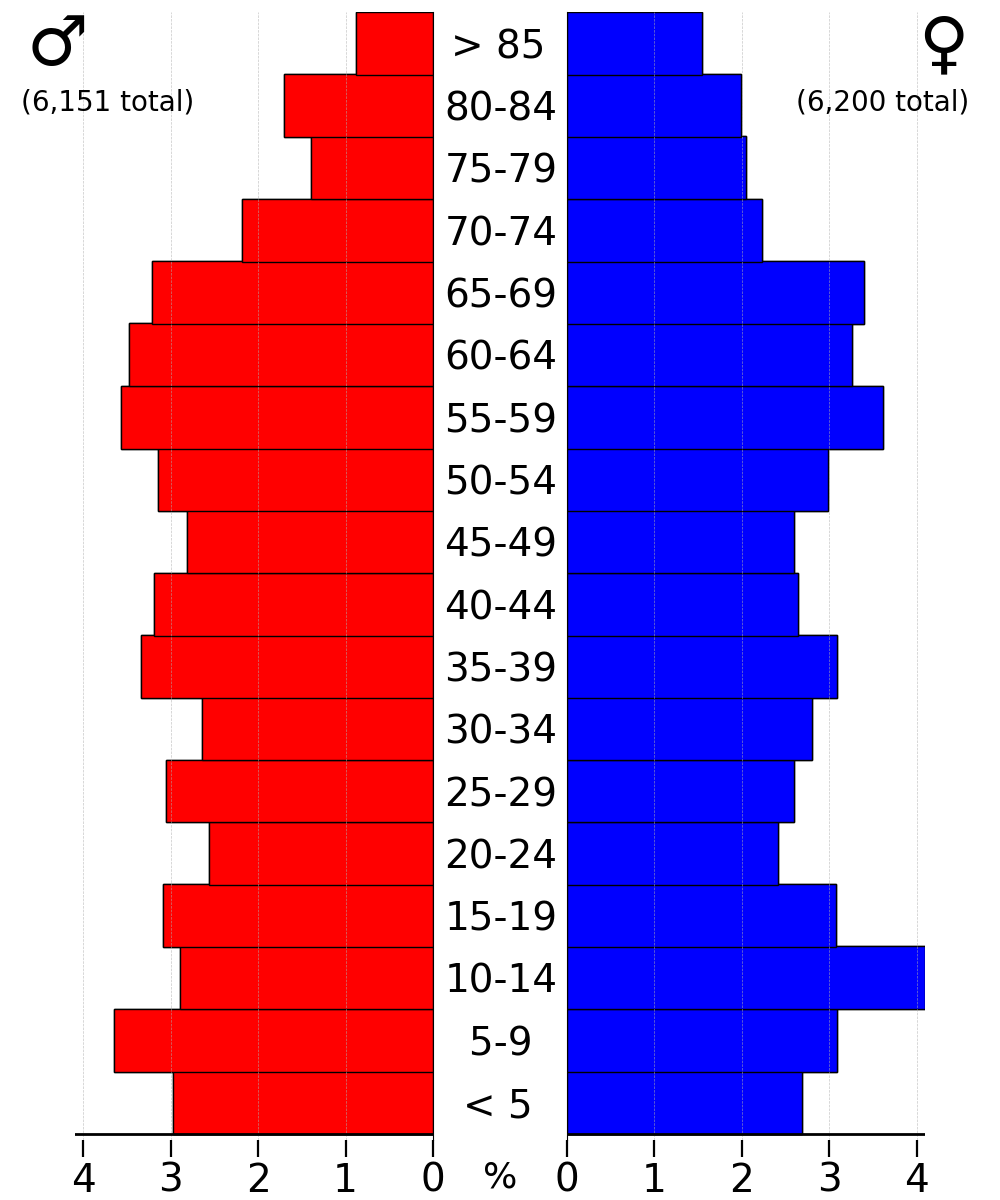
2022 US Census population pyramid for Grundy County from ACS 5-year estimates

As of the 2020 census, the county had a population of 12,329 and a population density of 24.6/sq mi (9.5/km^{2}). 96.97% of the population reported being of one race.

The racial makeup of the county was 96.0% White, 0.4% Black or African American, 0.1% American Indian and Alaska Native, 0.2% Asian, <0.1% Native Hawaiian and Pacific Islander, 0.3% from some other race, and 3.0% from two or more races. Hispanic or Latino residents of any race comprised 1.2% of the population.

The median age was 42.3 years. 23.8% of residents were under the age of 18 and 21.6% of residents were 65 years of age or older. For every 100 females there were 96.2 males, and for every 100 females age 18 and over there were 94.5 males age 18 and over.

There were 5,069 households in the county, of which 28.2% had children under the age of 18 living in them. Of all households, 57.4% were married-couple households, 16.3% were households with a male householder and no spouse or partner present, and 20.9% were households with a female householder and no spouse or partner present. About 27.6% of all households were made up of individuals and 14.3% had someone living alone who was 65 years of age or older.

There were 5,465 housing units, of which 7.2% were vacant. Among occupied housing units, 82.5% were owner-occupied and 17.5% were renter-occupied. The homeowner vacancy rate was 1.5% and the rental vacancy rate was 9.4%.

<0.1% of residents lived in urban areas, while 100.0% lived in rural areas.

=== 2010 census ===
The 2010 census recorded a population of 12,453 in the county, with a population density of 24.8/sq mi (9.6/km^{2}). There were 5,530 housing units, of which 5,131 were occupied.

=== 2000 census ===
At the 2000 census, there were 12,369 people, 4,984 households and 3,583 families residing in the county. The population density was 25 inhabitants per square mile (9.7/km^{2}). There were 5,304 housing units at an average density of 11 per square mile (4.2/km^{2}). The racial makeup of the county was 98.97% White, 0.08% Black or African American, 0.02% Native American, 0.29% Asian, 0.15% from other races, and 0.48% from two or more races. 0.58% of the population were Hispanic or Latino of any race.

There were 4,984 households, of which 30.70% had children under the age of 18 living with them, 63.80% were married couples living together, 5.50% had a female householder with no husband present, and 28.10% were non-families. 25.50% of all households were made up of individuals, and 14.20% had someone living alone who was 65 years of age or older. The average household size was 2.45 and the average family size was 2.94.

25.20% of the population were under the age of 18, 6.30% from 18 to 24, 25.10% from 25 to 44, 24.10% from 45 to 64, and 19.30% who were 65 years of age or older. The median age was 41 years. For every 100 females, there were 95.70 males. For every 100 females age 18 and over, there were 92.10 males.

The median household income was $39,396, and the median family income was $46,627. Males had a median income of $32,006 and females $22,003. The per capita income was $19,142. About 3.30% of families and 4.60% of the population were below the poverty line, including 4.60% of those under age 18 and 5.70% of those age 65 or over.

== Communities ==
=== Cities ===
- Beaman
- Conrad
- Dike
- Grundy Center
- Holland
- Morrison
- Reinbeck
- Stout
- Wellsburg

=== Townships ===
- Beaver Township
- Black Hawk Township
- Clay Township
- Colfax Township
- Fairfield Township
- Felix Township
- German Township
- Grant Township
- Lincoln Township
- Melrose Township
- Palermo Township
- Pleasant Valley Township
- Shiloh Township
- Washington Township

=== Population ranking ===
The population ranking of the following table is based on the 2020 census of Grundy County.

† county seat

Rank	City/Town/etc.	Municipal type	Population (2020 Census)	Population (2024 Estimate)
1	† Grundy Center	City	2,796	2,821
2	Reinbeck	City	1,662	1,673
3	Dike	City	1,304	1,293
4	Conrad	City	1,093	1,098
5	Wellsburg	City	720	709
6	Holland	City	269	261
7	Stout	City	191	194
8	Beaman	City	161	155
9	Morrison	City	98	101

== Politics ==
Grundy County has long been one of the most consistently Republican counties in Iowa. The county has only voted for a candidate of a different party four times since the county was founded in 1851. The first occasion was in 1912, when former Republican Theodore Roosevelt won the county as the Progressive candidate. During his two landslide victories of 1932 and 1936, Franklin D. Roosevelt became the first Democrat to win Grundy County in its history. The final time a non-Republican candidate carried the county was in 1964, when Lyndon B. Johnson won in a nationwide landslide. No Democratic candidate has ever received more than 60% of the vote in the county, and in the last twenty-one elections (beginning in 1944), the Republican obtained at least 60% of the vote in sixteen of them, and the Republicans have hit at least 65% in ten of the twenty-one elections in that span.

United States presidential election results for Grundy County, Iowa
Year	Republican		Democratic		Third party(ies)	
Year	No.	%	No.	%	No.	%
1896	1,894	60.36%	1,206	38.43%	38	1.21%
1900	2,025	61.79%	1,203	36.71%	49	1.50%
1904	2,021	66.55%	938	30.89%	78	2.57%
1908	1,861	61.77%	1,105	36.67%	47	1.56%
1912	421	13.60%	1,149	37.12%	1,525	49.27%
1916	2,127	67.23%	1,015	32.08%	22	0.70%
1920	4,662	85.82%	714	13.14%	56	1.03%
1924	3,322	57.84%	615	10.71%	1,806	31.45%
1928	3,671	69.03%	1,620	30.46%	27	0.51%
1932	2,419	39.44%	3,661	59.68%	54	0.88%
1936	2,656	39.62%	3,918	58.45%	129	1.92%
1940	3,908	58.56%	2,745	41.13%	21	0.31%
1944	3,625	62.14%	2,191	37.56%	18	0.31%
1948	3,154	55.85%	2,344	41.51%	149	2.64%
1952	5,652	78.98%	1,483	20.72%	21	0.29%
1956	4,915	71.99%	1,908	27.95%	4	0.06%
1960	4,989	69.62%	2,174	30.34%	3	0.04%
1964	3,215	47.22%	3,582	52.61%	11	0.16%
1968	4,866	71.14%	1,675	24.49%	299	4.37%
1972	4,706	71.03%	1,844	27.83%	75	1.13%
1976	4,173	62.66%	2,410	36.19%	77	1.16%
1980	4,644	66.10%	1,869	26.60%	513	7.30%
1984	4,527	69.45%	1,915	29.38%	76	1.17%
1988	3,433	60.42%	2,211	38.91%	38	0.67%
1992	3,160	51.33%	1,895	30.78%	1,101	17.88%
1996	2,928	51.49%	2,322	40.83%	437	7.68%
2000	3,851	63.02%	2,139	35.00%	121	1.98%
2004	4,429	64.67%	2,386	34.84%	34	0.50%
2008	3,945	57.77%	2,790	40.86%	94	1.38%
2012	4,215	60.54%	2,635	37.85%	112	1.61%
2016	4,527	65.88%	1,856	27.01%	489	7.12%
2020	4,929	67.74%	2,206	30.32%	141	1.94%
2024	4,998	69.94%	2,019	28.25%	129	1.81%

== Notable people ==
- Coker F. Clarkson (1811–1890), Iowa senator and agricultural journalist
- James S. Clarkson (1842–1918), Republican political leader and newspaper editor

== See also ==
- National Register of Historic Places listings in Grundy County, Iowa
