= The Goddess of Grapes =

Sculpture by Deb Zeller

== History ==
The Goddess of Grapes in Sioux City, Iowa was sculpted by Deb Zeller and purchased by Sculpt Siouxland in 2010. Sculpt Siouxland is a private nonprofit organization that was developed by staff from the Sioux City Growth Organization to help preserve their ongoing mission to make downtown Sioux City more engaging with art. The Goddess of Grapes was later installed as part of the permanent collection outside on Fourth Street. It is a representation of the goddess Ariadne, wife of Dionysus.

The statue was displayed until September 22, 2015, when an employee noticed that it had been stolen from its spot while doing a routine check of their outside collections pieces. On September 28, 2015, the statue was found outside of the Sioux City Art Center on a bench where it was brought inside to check for damages. After the Goddess of Grapes statue was cleared of damages, it was then put back in its original place on Fourth Street a month later. Two years later, the statue was stolen again from the same spot in late June 2017. In April 2019, the Goddess of Grapes statue was found and returned after nearly two years and in a different town, Waterloo, Iowa. The statue was first found in a garage by a homeless woman, Shelly Reichert, while visiting a friend in Des Moines, Iowa around December 2018. Later confirming the authenticity of the statue, Reichert contacted the curator of the Sioux City Art Center, Todd Behrens, to inform him of where the statue was and to schedule a retrieval of the statue. The object would be picked up from the Grout Museum in Waterloo, Iowa from Nick Erickson who is the Registrar there. The statue was then checked for damages, and will be off display until repairs can be completed. Once repairs are done, the statue will be placed in a more secure location that still has not been determined.

== Artist ==
Deb Zeller is an artist who primarily works out of Hopkins, Minnesota. She has her own studio as well as part owner of Parley Lake Winery, a vineyard. She is the founder of Bronze Buddies, a bronze consortium.
