= Cedar Valley Arboretum & Botanic Gardens =

Arboretum & botanic gardens in Waterloo, Iowa, United States

Coordinates: 42.430663°N 92.325025°W

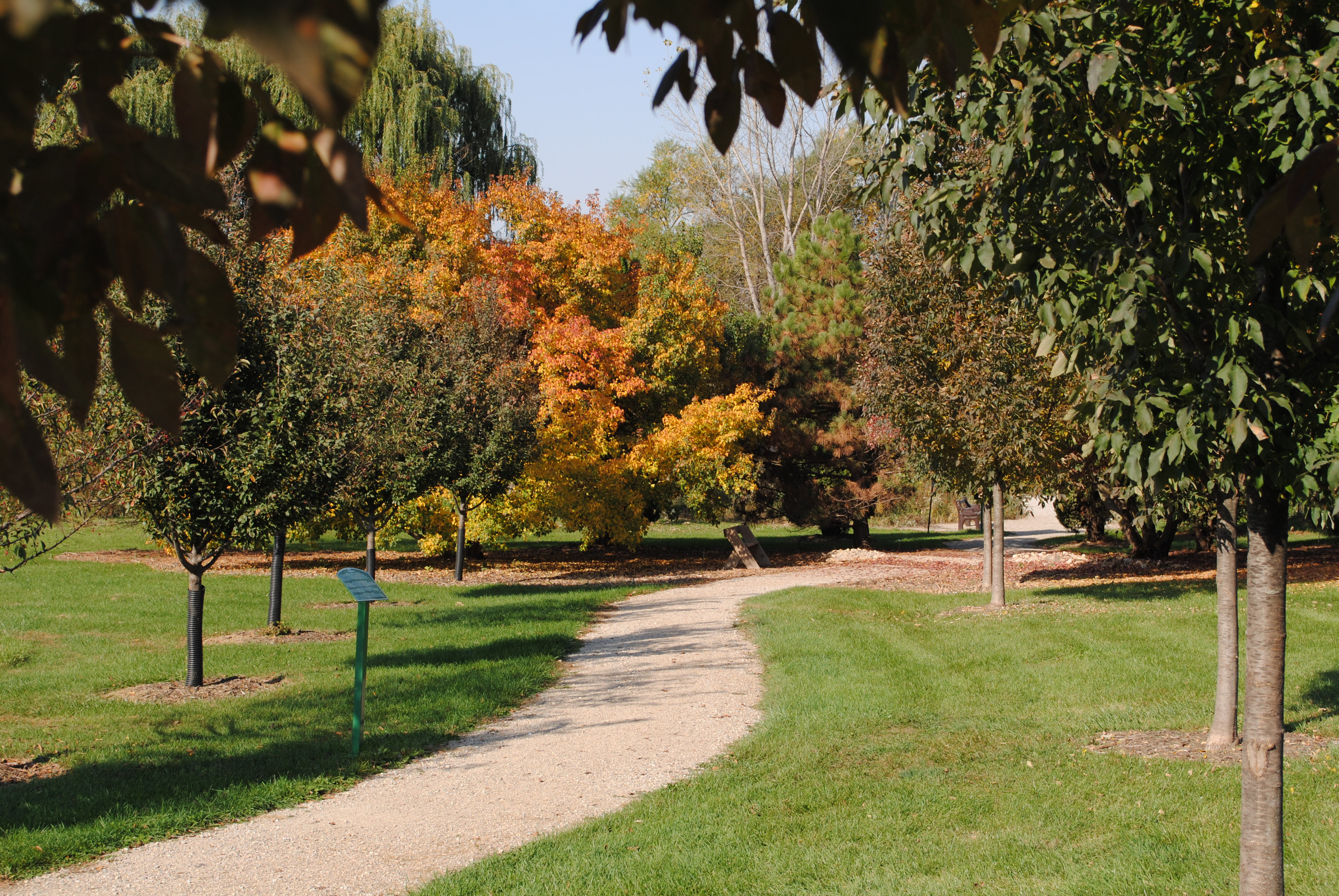
- One of the pathways in the arboretum
- Interactive map of Cedar Valley Arboretum & Botanic Gardens
- Website: Official website

The Cedar Valley Arboretum and Botanic Gardens was founded in 1996 and is located directly East of Hawkeye Community College in Waterloo, Iowa. The mission of the Arboretum is to enhance the quality of life for all individuals through horticulture. The vision of the Arboretum is to serve as a compelling public resource for the study of plants, a leader in environmental stewardship, a cultural center for the community, and a showcase of Iowa's rich heritage with the land. The Arboretum is a 501(c)(3) non-profit, independent organization and supported by its volunteer base and community support.

== History ==
The Arboretum was started by a group of community members wanting a green space in the Waterloo-Cedar Falls metropolitan area. The idea for the Cedar Valley Arboretum and Botanic Gardens came after a visit to the Dubuque Botanical Gardens where one of the founding members posed the question of why there wasn't a botanical gardens in the Cedar Valley area. Work to create the Arboretum's first master plan were begun in 1996 with financial support coming from the local hotel/motel tax fund and other supporters such as private donors and various fundraising efforts. Twenty firms were considered for the project which was then narrowed down to five firms. Of those five, three of them came to visit the site. After deliberation, the firm of Buettner and Associates, Inc. from Fox Point, Wisconsin, teamed with local architect Craig Ritland, from Craig Ritland Landscape Architects to complete the Arboretum’s original master plan.

The first tree was planted at the groundbreaking near the service area of a radio tower that was located on the property. The first major section of trees were planted in the spring of 1996 on Arbor day and was named “Sesquicentennial Forest” in honor of Iowa’s 150th anniversary. 150 trees were provided by local nurseries and the first members of the Arboretum's board began planting them with more trees to be planted later in the week by Hawkeye Community College students.

In 1997 the Head House (currently used as the Arboretum's Welcome/Visitor Center) was built in accordance of the Arboretum's Master Plan. The head house was used as storage for equipment and tools and meeting place for different gardening groups and events. Office space for staff would be held off-site until the late 2000s. Tool sheds were built for use in the community gardens and as early shade structures.

In 1998, the Arboretum hired its first director, Charlie Lott. Fundraisers and grant writing efforts are used to develop after school programs such as Earth Connections, assist in the addition of an irrigation system, and create a green house and raised garden beds so that people of all abilities can enjoy the Arboretum and volunteer. Plans for the eventual creation of a children's garden and educational center are put into motion with the help of Buettner and Associates. This year also marks the beginning of the Arboretum's largest event, the annual Fall Harvest Festival.

In 2023, a program launched by the Institute of Museum and Library Services allowed Iowans who are part of the Supplemental Nutrition Assistance Program free admission to the facility.

== Gardens and Grounds ==
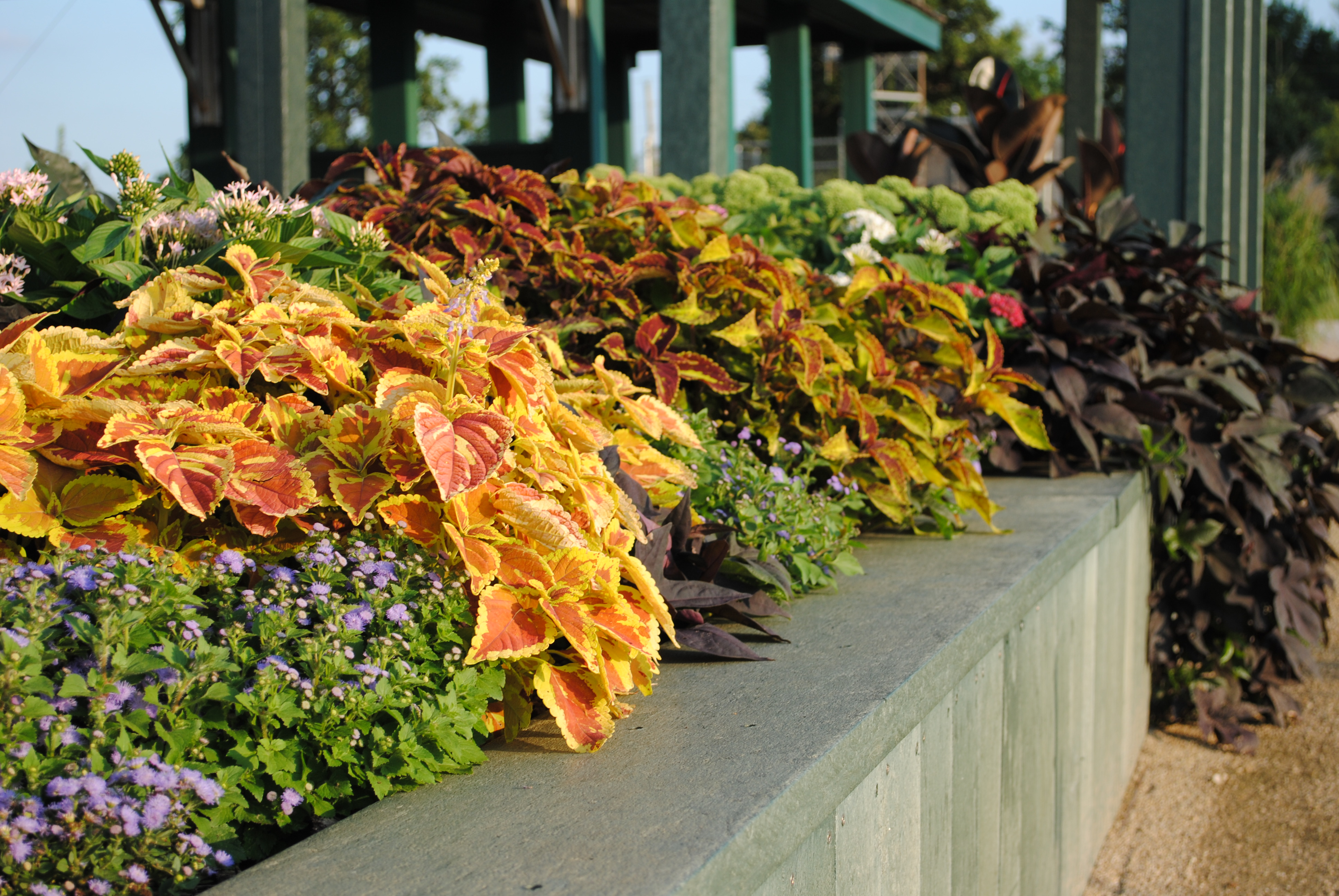
Enabling Garden

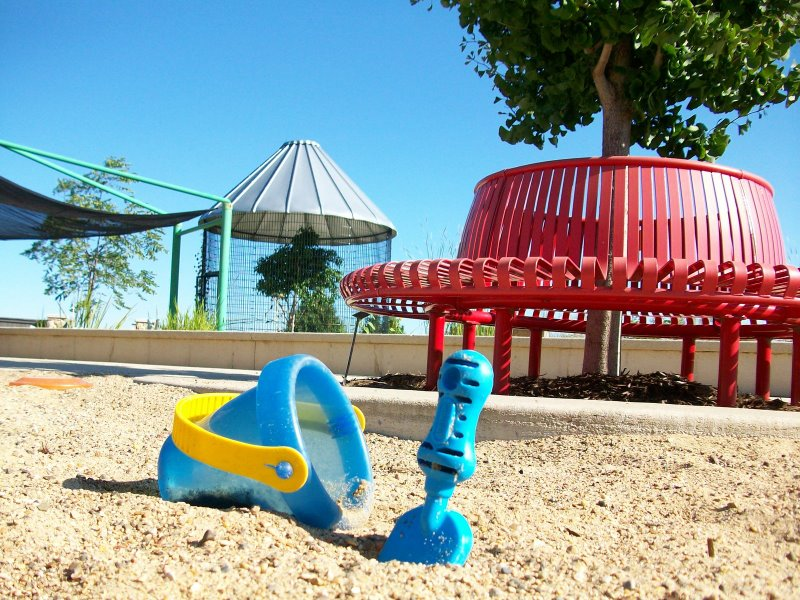
Children's Garden

The Arboretum sits on 40 acres that was previously used as farmland. With an emphasis on the natural world, the buildings, gardens, and artwork have a strong organic theme, tied to Iowa's agriculture roots.

The main areas of the Arboretum include:

- Welcome Center and Garden Entrance - At the North end of the parking lot sits the Welcome Center where visitors enter the garden. This building also houses staff offices and a small gift shop.
- Hillside Welcome Garden - This garden acts as a gateway into the Arboretum. Completed in 2014, the Hillside Welcome Garden has large patio space for eating, relaxing, spending time with family and friends, a 4-level water feature, and a cottage style garden beneath a pergola. A hand-crafted cedar arbor then leads guests into the Arboretum.
- Arrival Gardens - Varied in texture and form, shrubs in the garden include several varieties of viburnum, juniper, serviceberry and ninebark.
- Labyrinth
- Rose Garden - Filled with shrub roses hardy to Northeast Iowa.
- Mosaiculture Garden - A mosaiculture is a sculpture created from various plants. The Cedar Valley Arboretum & Botanic Gardens created what is believed the first ever mosaiculture in Iowa in 2014 in the form of a peacock.
- Display Gardens - Filled with a variety of annuals, perennials and spring-flowering bulbs.
- Enabling Gardens - Situated between the Rose and Display Gardens, the flower beds are raised so that people with disabilities are still able to garden.
- Children's Gardens - with a Railway Garden, Dinosaur Dig, Garden Prairie, a Hobbit hole and the Peek-a-Boo Forest filled with dwarf conifers.
- Shade Garden - Among a grove of Locust trees, the Shade Garden has an array of sizes and color variations of the Hosta family.
- Walking Paths and Prairie - Prairie that encompasses a great diversity of native forbs and grasses. The one-mile walking path through the grounds of the Arboretum.
- R.J. McElroy Education Center - Adjacent to the Children’s Garden, the R.J. McElroy Education Center hosts all children’s programming as well as Arboretum summer events.
- Butterfly Conservation Meadow - A four acre butterfly garden
- Master Gardeners Orchard - This garden is currently in the planning stages, but will feature an orchard separated in quadrants that will be maintained by the Iowa State University Extension Master Gardeners.

== Gallery ==
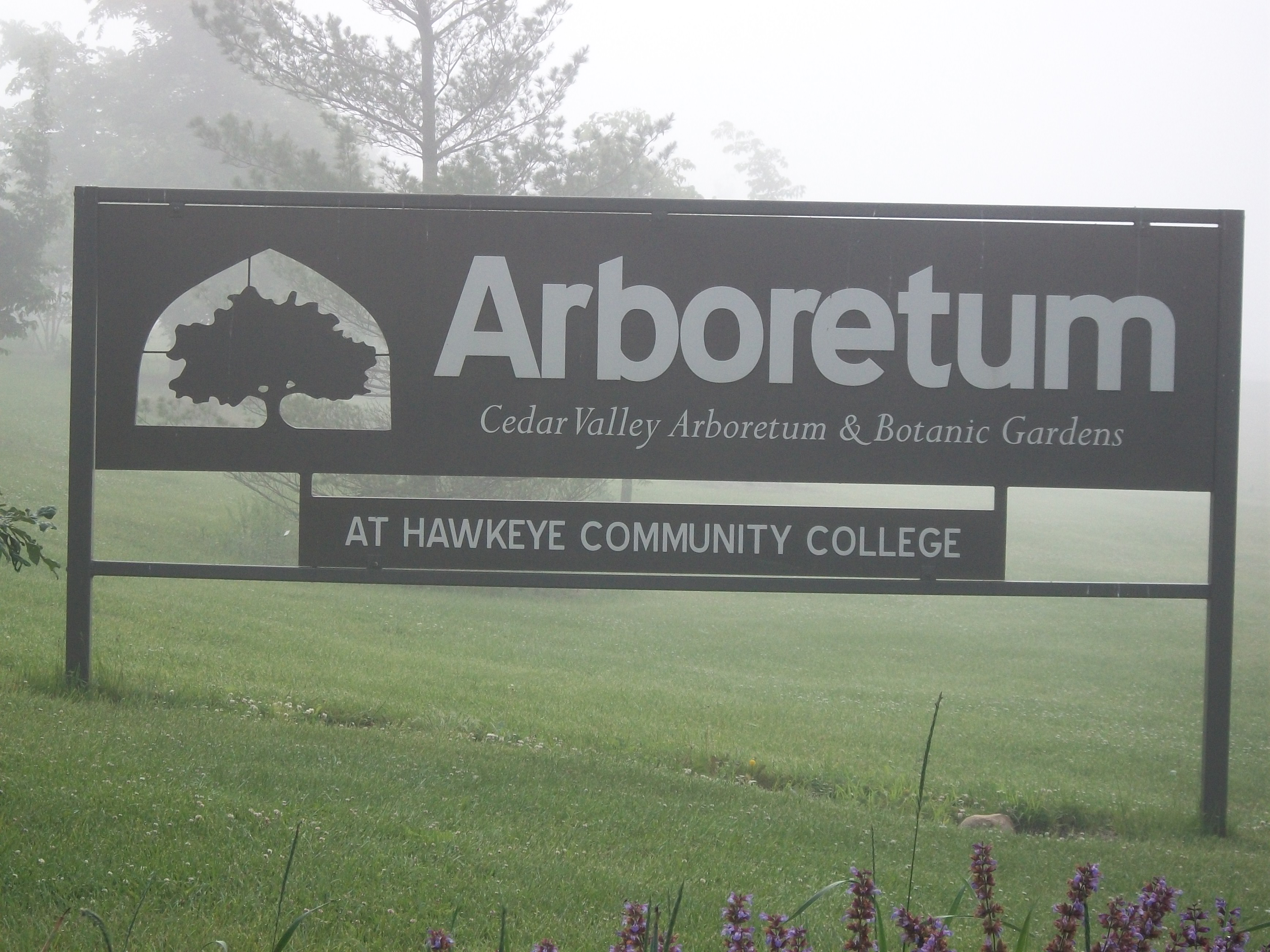
Arboretum Entrance

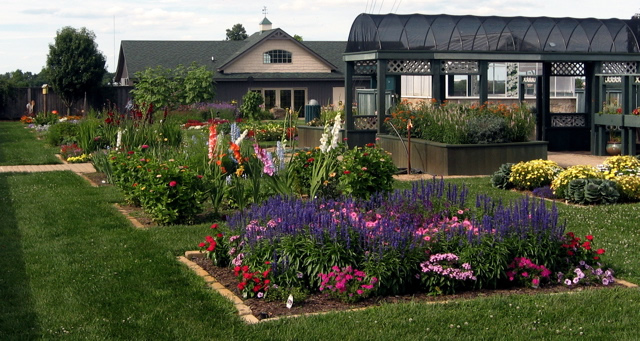
Community Gardens

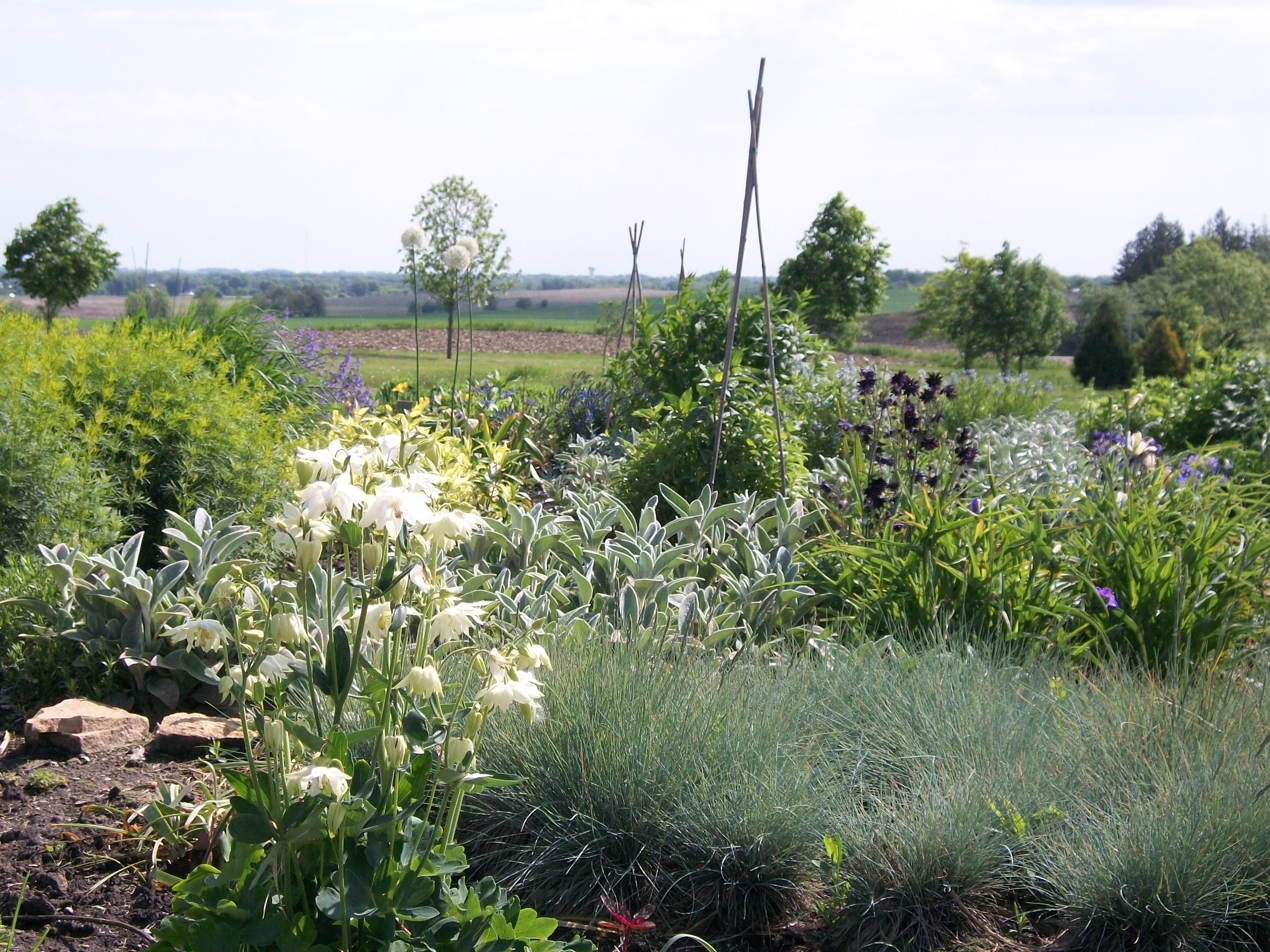
Display Gardens

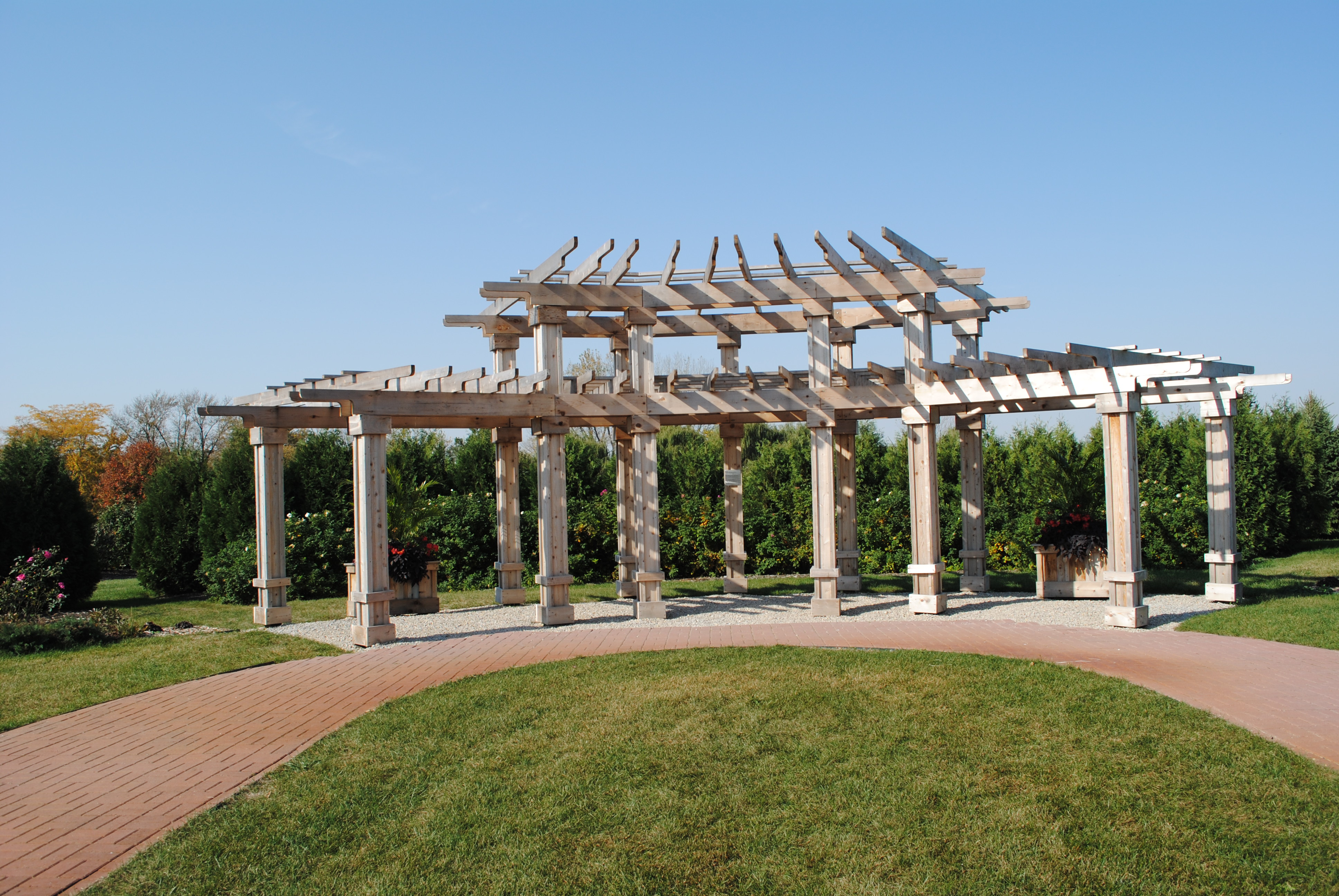
Rose Garden Pergola

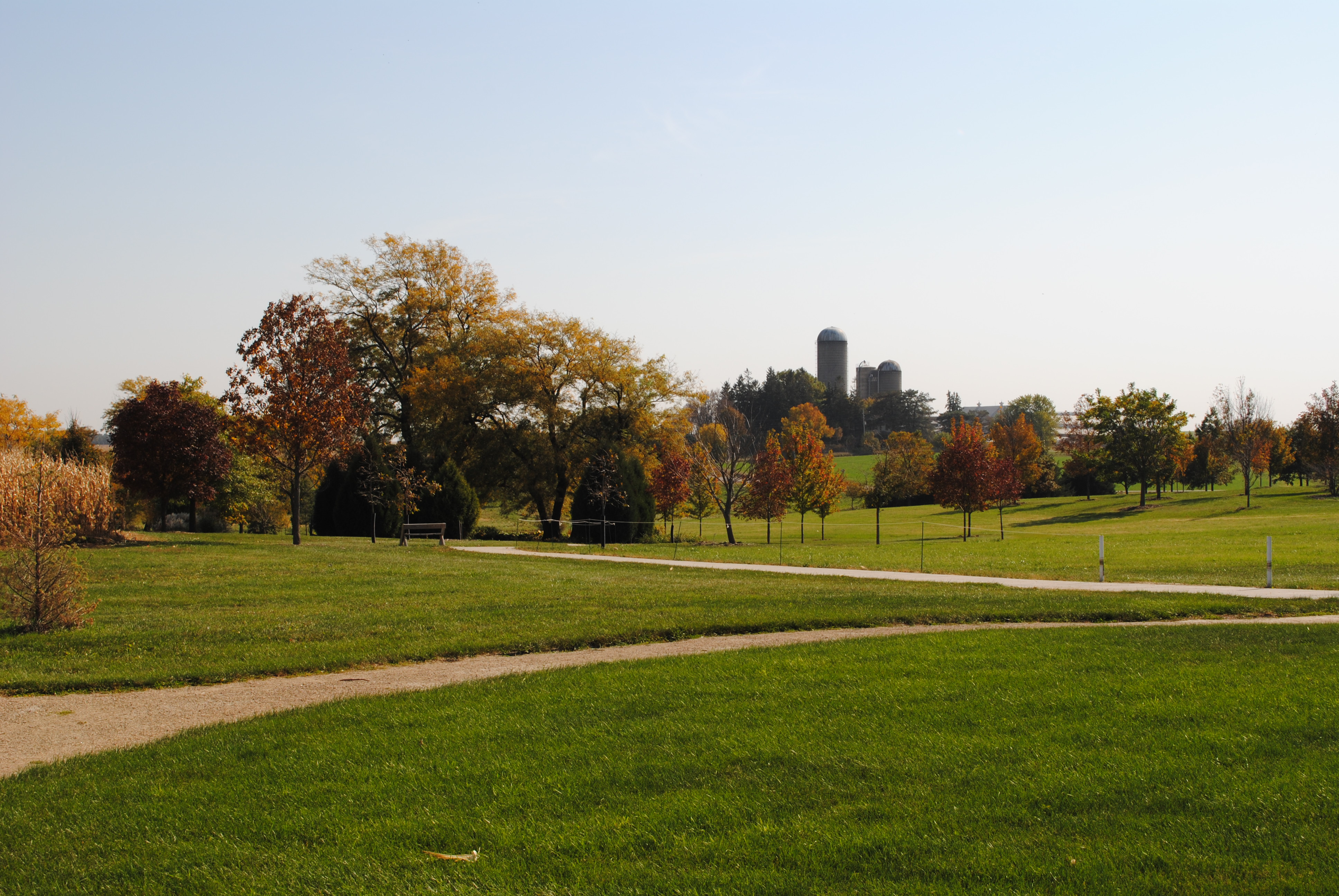
Path to Shade Garden

== See also ==
- List of botanical gardens in the United States
