= Senator Grout =

Senator Grout may refer to:

- Aaron H. Grout (1879–1966), Vermont State Senate
- Henry W. Grout (1858–1932), Iowa State Senate
- Josiah Grout (1842–1925), Vermont State Senate
- William W. Grout (1836–1902), Vermont State Senate
