= Gordon Randolph =

American journalist (1915–1999)

Gordon Randolph (October 3, 1915 – November 6, 1999) was an American journalist who wrote for the Milwaukee Journal Sentinel from 1938 to 1980. Born in Waterloo, Iowa, he grew up in Milwaukee, Wisconsin and graduated from the University of Wisconsin–Madison. He wrote many articles about his family. For example, in one news clip he wrote about how, in the 1950s, he took his family on a trip out west and only spent $500.
