= Hawkeye Community College =

Community college in Waterloo, Iowa, US

Coordinates: 42.431009°N 92.3296993°W

- Former name: Hawkeye Institute of Technology
- Type: Public community college
- Established: 1966
- Accreditation: Higher Learning Commission
- President: Todd Holcomb
- Provost: Lynn LaGrone
- Students: 5,040 (fall 2025)
- Location: Waterloo, Iowa, Iowa, U.S.
- Campus: Rural
- Colors: Blue and orange
- Nickname: RedTails
- Sporting affiliations: Iowa Community College Athletic Conference, National Junior College Athletic Association
- Website: www.hawkeyecollege.edu

Hawkeye Community College is a public community college in Waterloo, Iowa, United States. It serves the general public and a geographical area covering all or part of 10 northeast and east-central Iowa counties, including the cities of Waterloo, Cedar Falls, Waverly, and Independence.

== History ==
The Hawkeye Institute of Technology opened on July 1, 1966, replacing the Waterloo Area Vocational School previously operated by the Waterloo Community School District. The idea came from a comprehensive community survey, which showed a desire for a technical college in the area. Local business leaders, led by Harold Brock, petitioned the Iowa Board of Instruction in 1965 for permission to create a vocational-technical school.

In 1992, Hawkeye became "comprehensive", adding courses in the liberal arts and sciences. In July 1993, the college's name changed from Hawkeye Institute of Technology to Hawkeye Community College.

== Locations ==
=== Main campus ===
Located on East Orange Road on the south edge of Waterloo, Iowa, the main campus opened in the fall of 1969 with the dedication of Butler Hall and Buchanan Hall. Over the decades the college continued to expand and add new facilities, creating a campus with 13 primary buildings.

==== Buildings on main campus ====
- Black Hawk Hall
- Bremer Hall
- Brock Student Center
- Buchanan Hall
- Butler Hall
- Chickasaw Hall
- Fayette Hall
- Grundy Hall
- Hawkeye Center
- Health Education and Services Center
- Library
- Physical Plant
- Tama Hall

===== Grundy Hall =====
Hawkeye completed a $21 million renovation of Grundy Hall in January 2024, expanding the college's capacity to train healthcare workers. The renovated building features a new Dental Clinic (opened in August 2022), a heated ambulance bay, and a state-of-the-art simulation center.

==== Butler Hall ====
Hawkeye is currently renovating Butler Hall and adding a 30,000-square-foot addition. The project will update training spaces for automotive and construction trades programs, as well as plumbing and electrical apprenticeships. The anticipated completion date is January 2028.

=== Cedar Falls Center ===
Opened in 1999, the Cedar Falls Center is located in Cedar Falls, Iowa, and offers business and industry training, including registered apprenticeships.

=== Van G. Miller Adult Learning Center ===
The Adult Learning Center in downtown Waterloo, Iowa, was dedicated in 2019 and named after local businessman and philanthropist Van G. Miller. The center provides adult basic education, high school completion, English Language Learning, and integrated education and training programs. It is also home to the Senior Companion Program, Family Literacy Program, and college transition services.

=== Western Outreach Center ===
Located in the Grundy County Industrial Park near Holland, Iowa, the Western Outreach Center provides concurrent enrollment courses to area high schools in Grundy and Butler counties.

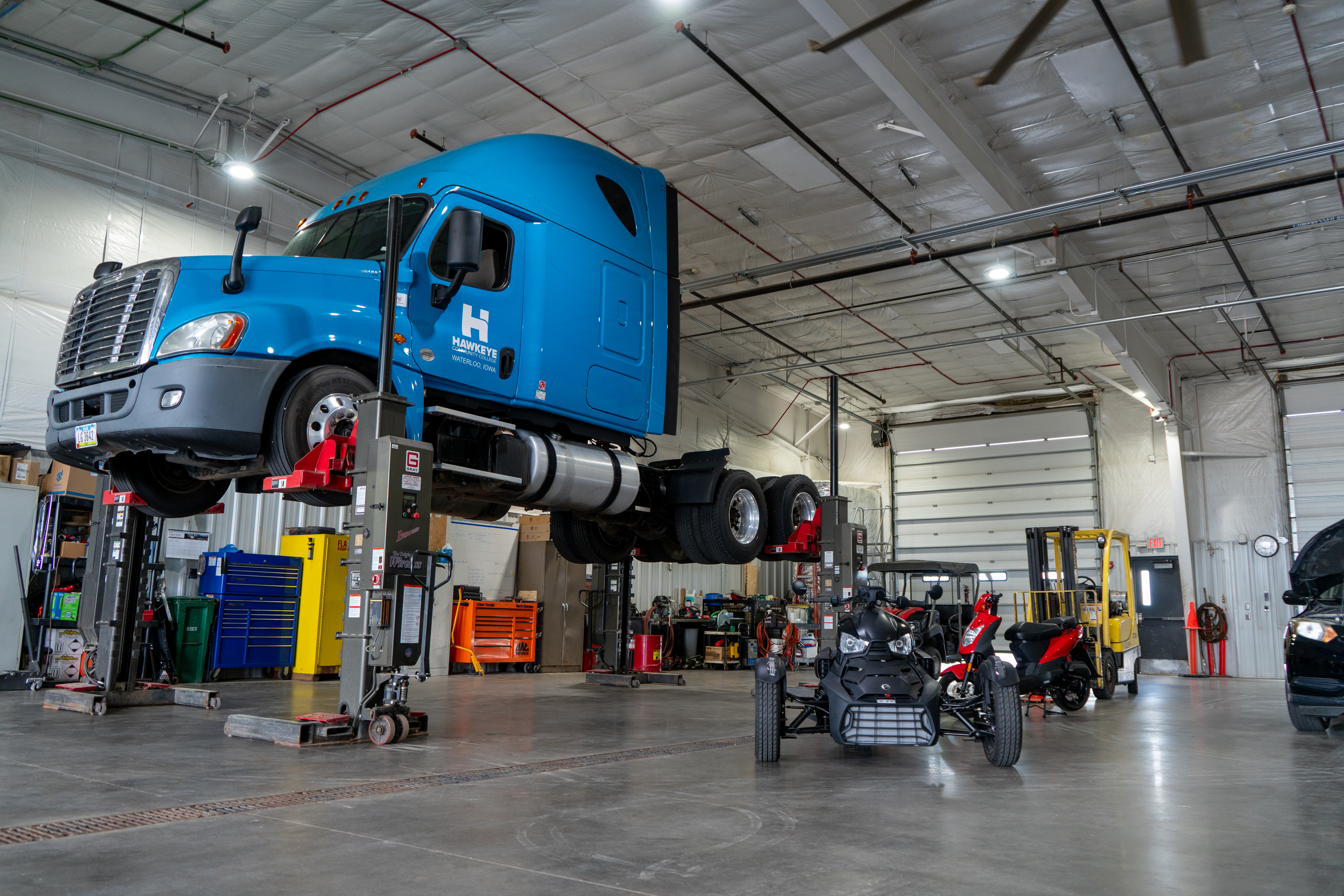
A truck bay in the Regional Transportation Training Center at Hawkeye Community College in Waterloo, Iowa.

=== Regional Transportation Training Center ===
Dedicated in 2012, the Regional Transportation Training Center includes a driving range with 26-foot wide roads, inclines, and turns. The center houses classrooms, drive through truck bays, and virtual driving simulators. The center offers a variety of short-term training and continuing education driving courses. In 2025 Hawkeye dedicated a 7,500-square-foot expansion of the center, including the addition of three classrooms, a second simulation lab, a test proctoring room, a third shop bay with large overhead doors, a student lounge, and faculty offices.

=== Automation and Robotics Center ===
Located inside TechWorks in Waterloo, Iowa, the Automation and Robotics Center provides individuals and businesses with training on advanced manufacturing technology, and stackable credentials. It features interactive classrooms and fully equipped lab spaces.

== Administration ==
Hawkeye is governed by a nine-member board of trustees with each trustee representing a district in the 10-county regional service area. Each trustee serves a four-year term and is elected by the voters in their districts.

Presidents of the college have included:

- Travis Martin, 1966-1976
- John Hawse, 1976-1992
- Phillip Barry, 1992-1996
- William Hierstein, 1996-2001
- Bettsey Barhorst, 2001-2005
- Greg Schmitz, 2005-2011
- Linda Allen, 2011-2019
- Todd Holcomb, 2019-Present

== Academics ==
Hawkeye Community College is accredited by the Higher Learning Commission and approved by the Iowa Department of Education.

College academic programs are divided into 11 career areas:

- Agriculture
- Arts & Humanities
- Automotive & Transportation
- Business
- Construction Trades
- Education
- Health Science & Services
- Information Technology
- Manufacturing & Engineering
- Science & Mathematics
- Social Sciences & Public Services

== Campus life ==
=== Student activities ===
Hawkeye Community College offers more than 25 student clubs and organizations and hosts many student activities throughout the year, most notably the annual Fall Fest celebration during August. On-campus dining is available at the RedTail Café, located inside the Brock Student Center on Main Campus.

==== Brock Student Center ====
The Brock Student Center is named after Mr. Harold Brock to honor his vision, leadership, and hard work in helping Hawkeye Community College grow. The center is home to the RedTail Café, the Veterans Resource Center, and The Brock Stop, which sells college-branded apparel and merchandise.

=== Health and wellness ===
==== Health Education and Services Center (HESC) ====
The Health Education and Services Center (HESC) on Main Campus hosts intramurals and tournaments and provides personal training and fitness assessments. Students have free access to use the gym and weight room and can participate in scheduled group fitness classes. HESC is also home to the Student Health Clinic, which provides free counseling and medical care to students.

=== Academic support ===
Hawkeye Community College provides students access to academic advisors, career advising, tutoring, a library, and other academic supports.

==== Library ====
The Hawkeye library is open to all college students and the general public. Members of the public can borrow many library materials through the Iowa Open Access program. The Library is located on the east side of Main Campus.

==== Unity and Understanding Center ====
The Unity and Understanding Center is home to Student Success Services and the Office of Student Connection and Experience. The center has study spaces, a lounge, a conference room for student groups, and connections to other campus offices and community resources.

==== Testing center ====
Hawkeye Community College is an official test site for several college entrance exams, professional certification exams, and a proctoring site. Current Hawkeye students can use testing center for make-up exams and testing accommodations. The Testing Center is located on the upper level of Hawkeye Center on Main Campus.

== Athletics ==
Hawkeye launched its RedTails athletics program for the 2015–2016 academic year. That team name refers to the red-tailed hawk and connects to both the "Hawkeye State" nickname and Waterloo's place as the seat of Black Hawk County. The Hawkeye's mascot, "Rusty," refers to the rusty red color of the red-tail's feathers.

Hawkeye is a member of the National Junior College Athletic Association and the Iowa Community College Athletic Conference.

=== Sports Teams ===
- Bowling (men's and women's)
- Cross Country (men's and women's)
- Dance
- Esports
- Golf (men's and women's)
- Soccer (men's and women's)
- Softball (women's)
- Sports Shooting
- Track & Field (men's and women's)
- Volleyball (women's)
- Wrestling (men's and women's)

== Notable alumni ==
- Bob Kressig, politician
- Pat Grassley, politician
