= Henry W. Grout =

American politician (1858–1932)

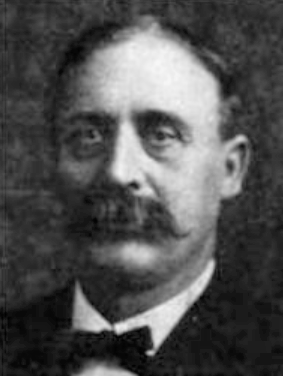

Member of the Iowa Senate
- In office 1914–1918
- Constituency: 38th District

Member of the Iowa House of Representatives
- In office 1910–1914

Personal details
- Born: Henry Whittemore Grout; March 24, 1858 Waterloo, Iowa
- Died: June 28, 1932 (aged 74) Waterloo, Iowa
- Party: Republican
- Spouses: Olive Wright Wilson (m. 1892; died 1910) Agnes A. Perry (m. 1914)
- Occupation: Financier, politician

Henry Whittemore Grout (March 24, 1858 – June 28, 1932) was a financier, state legislator, and philanthropist from Waterloo, Iowa. The Grout Museum is one of his legacies.

== Biography ==
Henry W. Grout was born in Waterloo, on March 24, 1858. He worked as a miner, farmer, traveling salesman, real estate agent, park commissioner and bank director.

He married Olive Wright Wilson on December 29, 1892. After her death on August 30, 1910, he remarried to Agnes A. Perry on September 3, 1914.

A Republican, he was elected to two terms in the Iowa House of Representatives, serving from 1910 to 1914. He represented the 38th District in the state Senate from 1914 to 1918.

He died in Waterloo on June 28, 1932, suffering a heart attack while giving a talk to the Optimist Club at the Hotel President.
