= Grout Museum =

Museum complex in Waterloo, Iowa

Grout Museum District
- Henry W. Grout Historical Museum
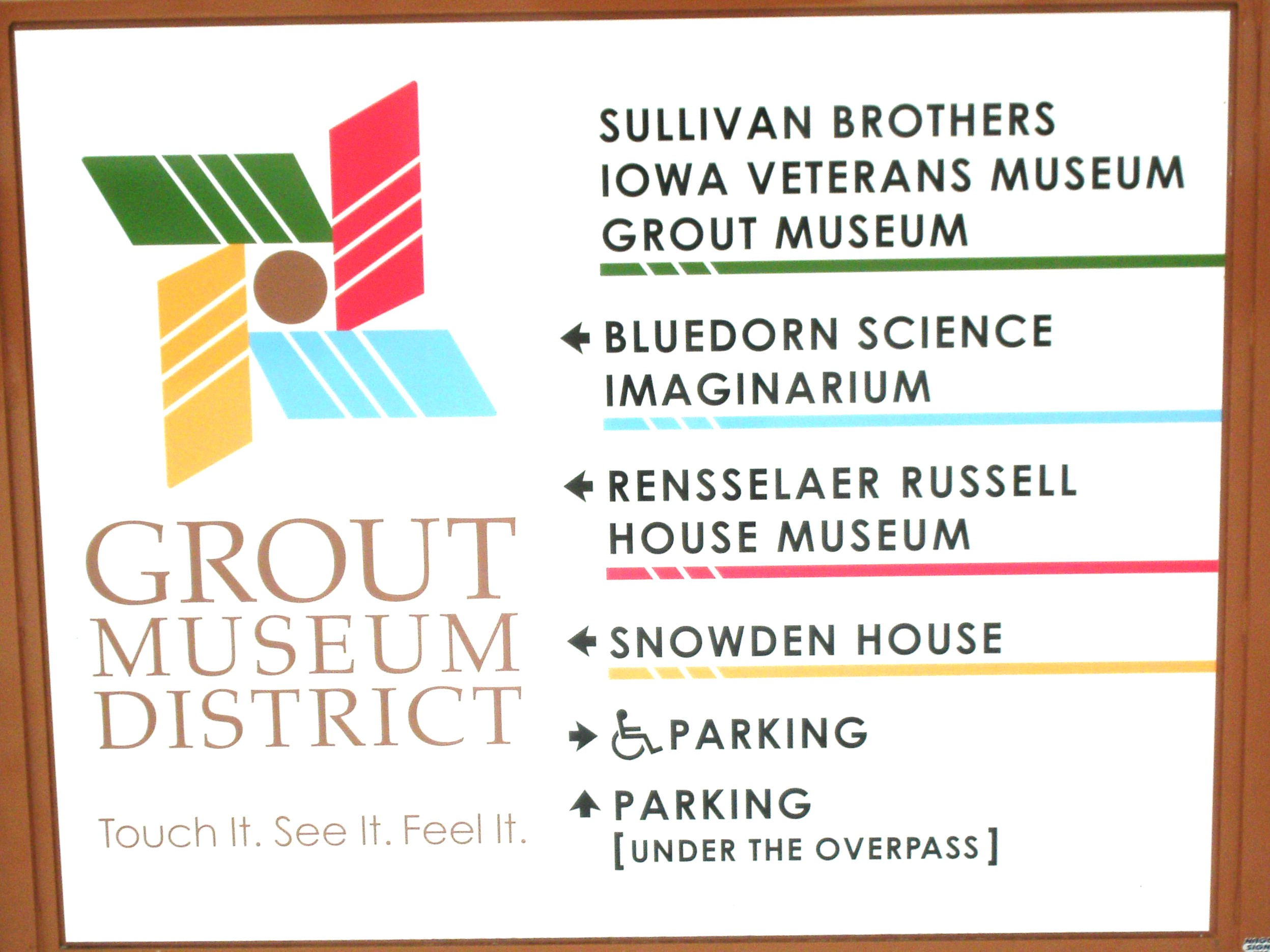
- Sign with Logo

- Location Waterloo, Iowa
- Established: October 1934
- Location: 503 South Street; Waterloo, Iowa, US
- Coordinates: 42.4923°N 92.3440°W
- Director: Billie Bailey (2011)
- Public transit access: 1 8 MET Transit
- Website: http://www.groutmuseumdistrict.org

The Grout Museum District is a set of museums in Waterloo, Iowa. Named after Henry W. Grout, the district consists of the Grout Museum of History & Science, Bluedorn Science Imaginarium, Rensselaer Russell House Museum, Snowden House and the Sullivan Brothers Iowa Veterans Museum.

== General history ==
The museum started with the private collection and endowment of Henry W. Grout, a Waterloo financier and legislator. The original Henry W. Grout Historical Museum was dedicated in October 1934.

The district is a nonprofit educational entity and is accredited by the American Alliance of Museums.

The Bluedorn Science Imaginarium operated in a former savings and loan bank building from 1993 to October 4, 2025, when the museum closed as a result of rising maintenance costs of the building and the loss of levy funding for the museum, with plans to move some of its interactive exhibits back to the main Grout Museum building.

The Sullivan Brothers Iowa Veteran's Museum opened in November 2008 as an $11 million dollar expansion of the Grout Museum building.

== Grout Museum of History & Science ==
By the time of his death, Grout had collected over 2,000 objects. He had established an endowment and named trustees to care for his collection, which was displayed for many years at the local YMCA (now the River Plaza building on 4th Street). The current building on South Street was completed in 1956 and opened to the public as a not-for-profit museum.

== Rensselaer Russell House Museum ==
The Rensselaer Russell House Museum is listed on the National Register of Historic Places and is one of the oldest homes in Black Hawk County. Guided tours are available.

== Picture Gallery ==
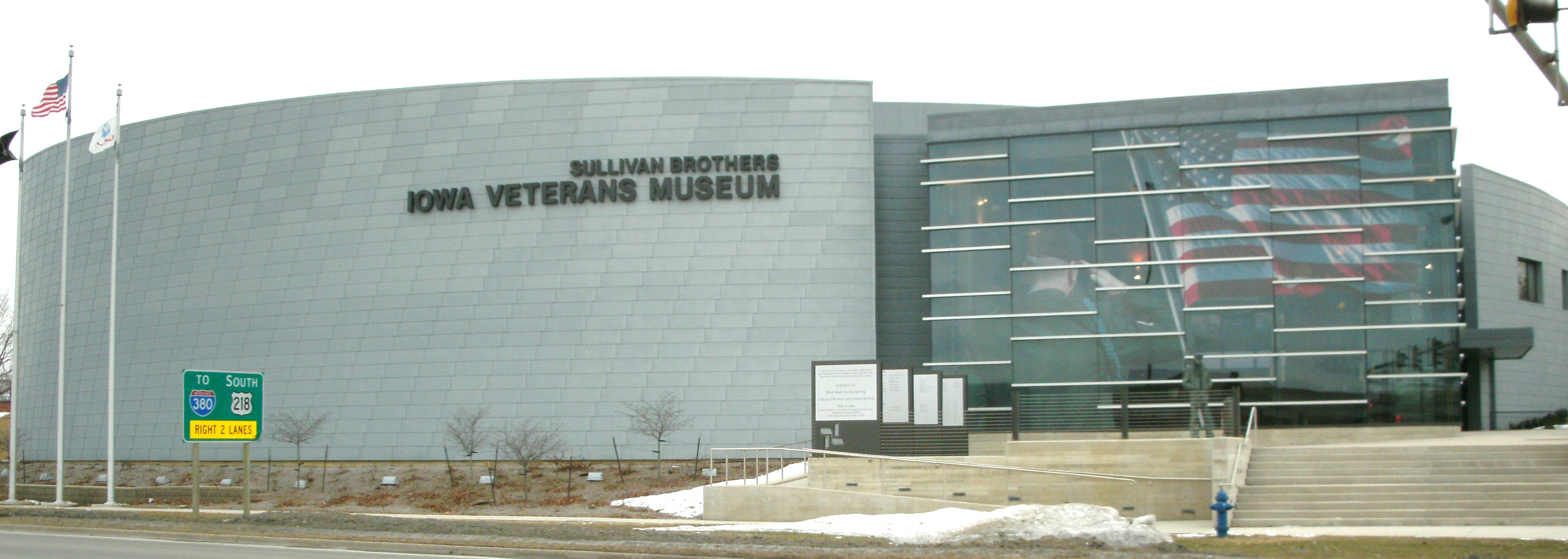
Sullivan Brothers Iowa Veterans Museum (2011)

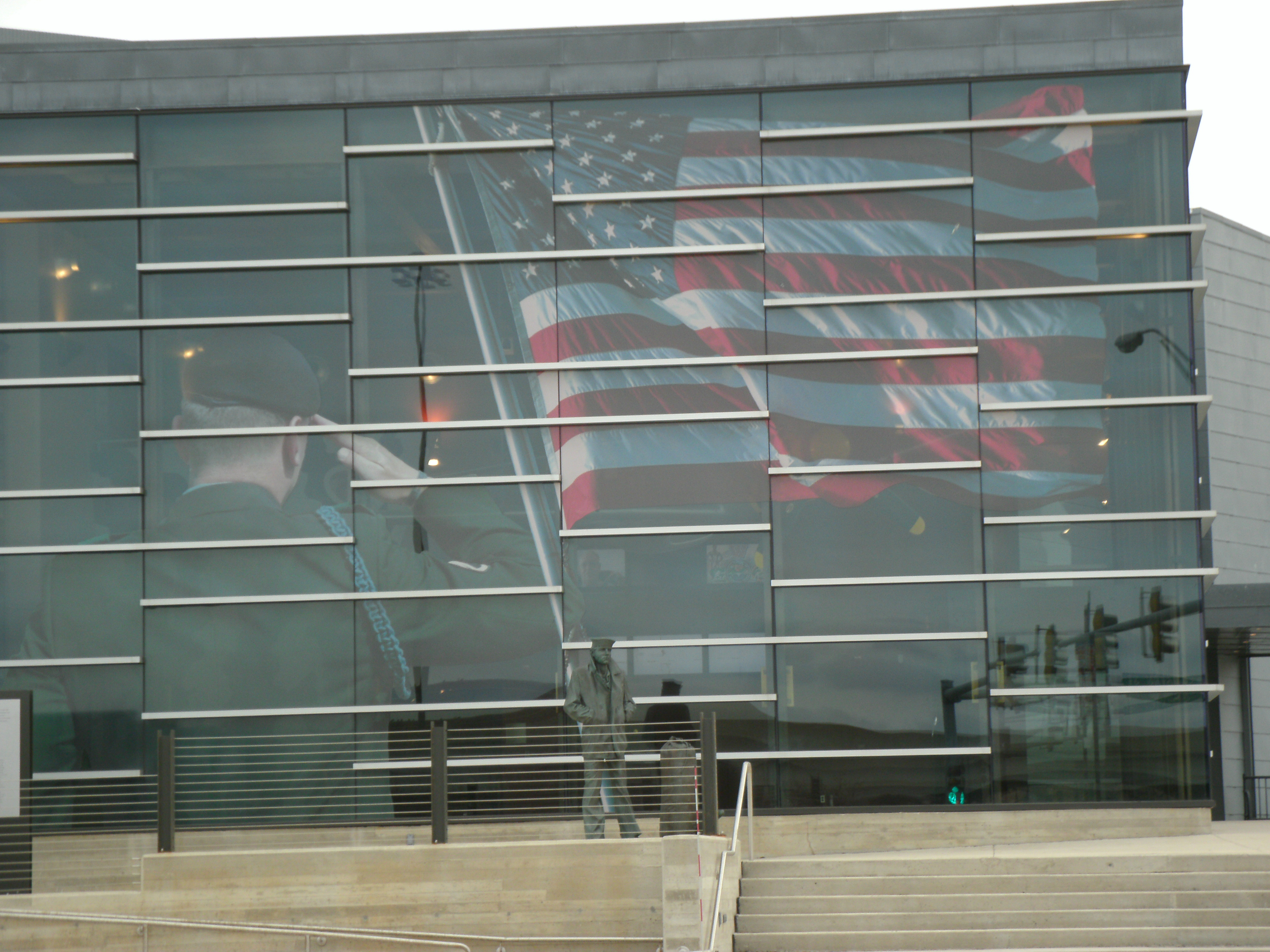
Closeup showing The Lone Sailor and glass flag (2011)

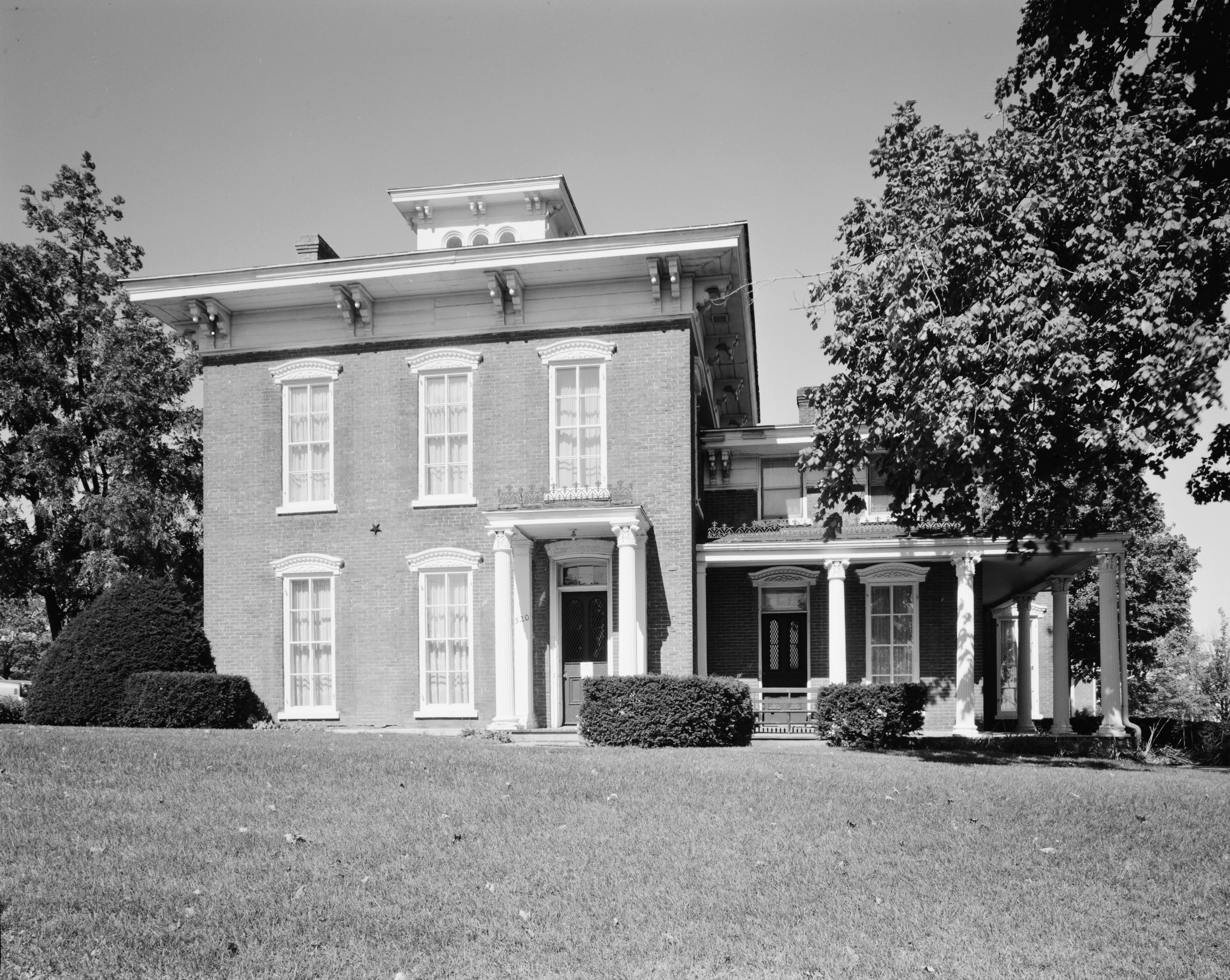
Rensselaer Russell House (1973)

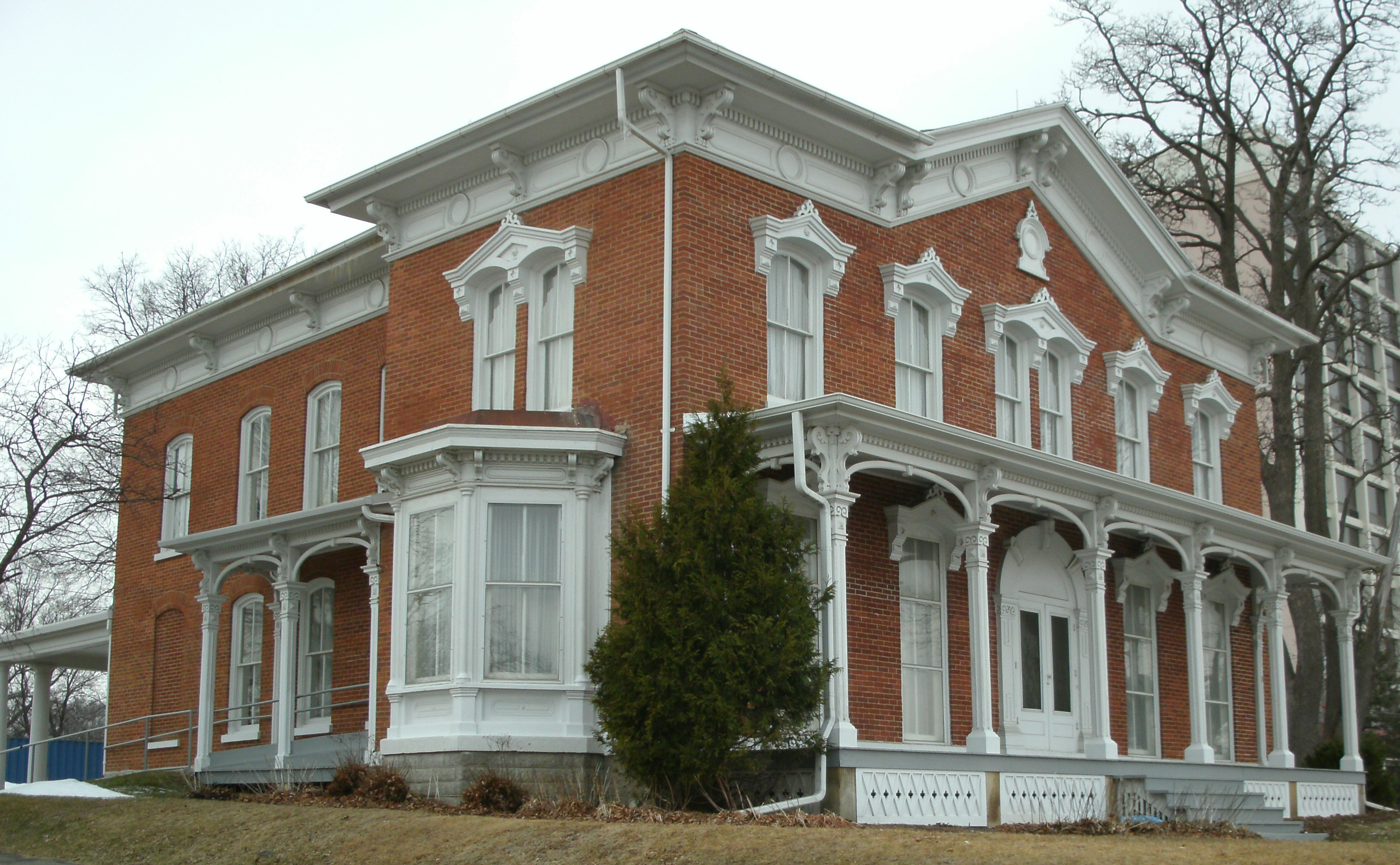
Snowden House front/side view (2011)

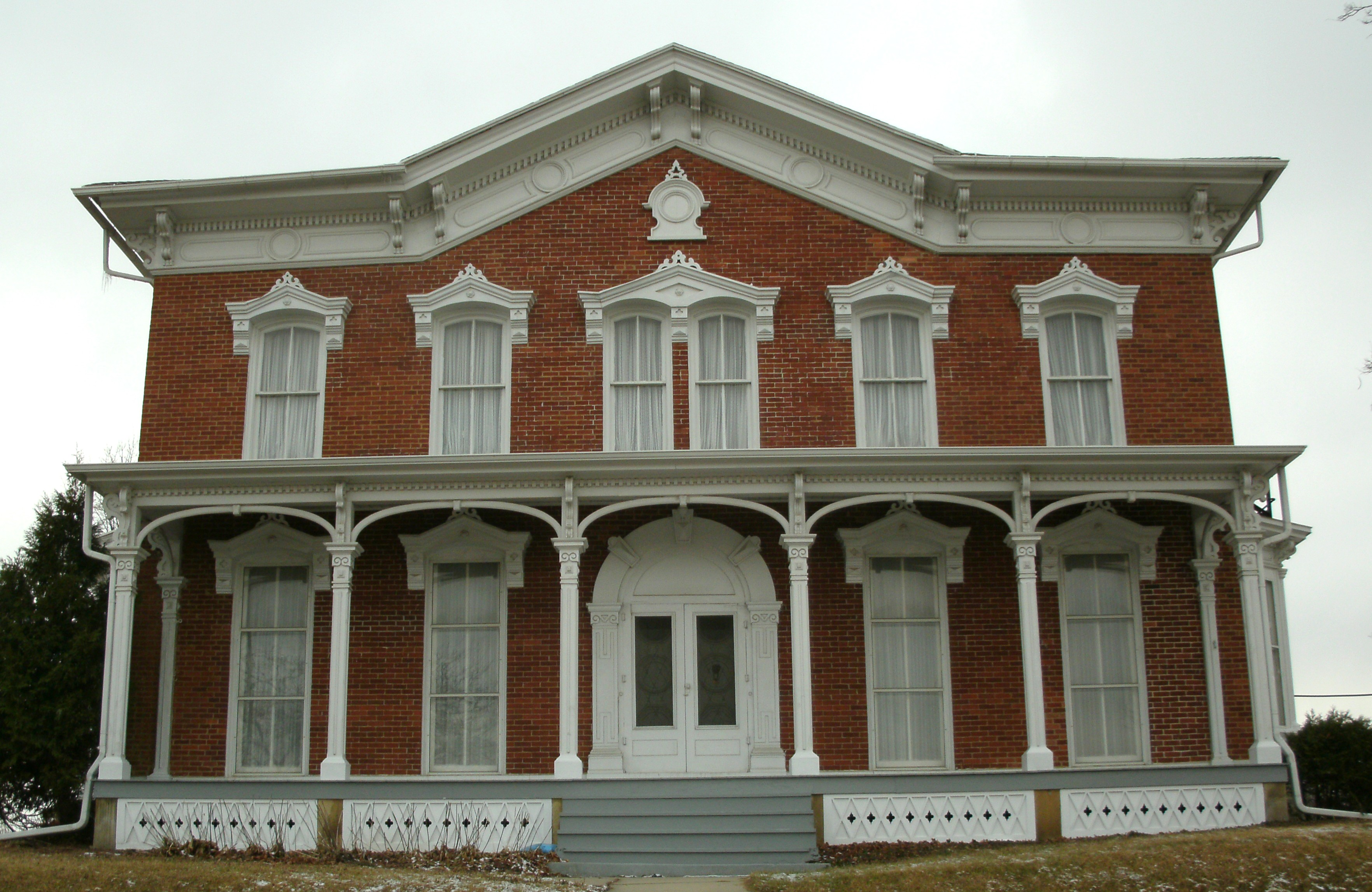
Snowden House front view (2011)
