= Waterloo, Iowa =

- City
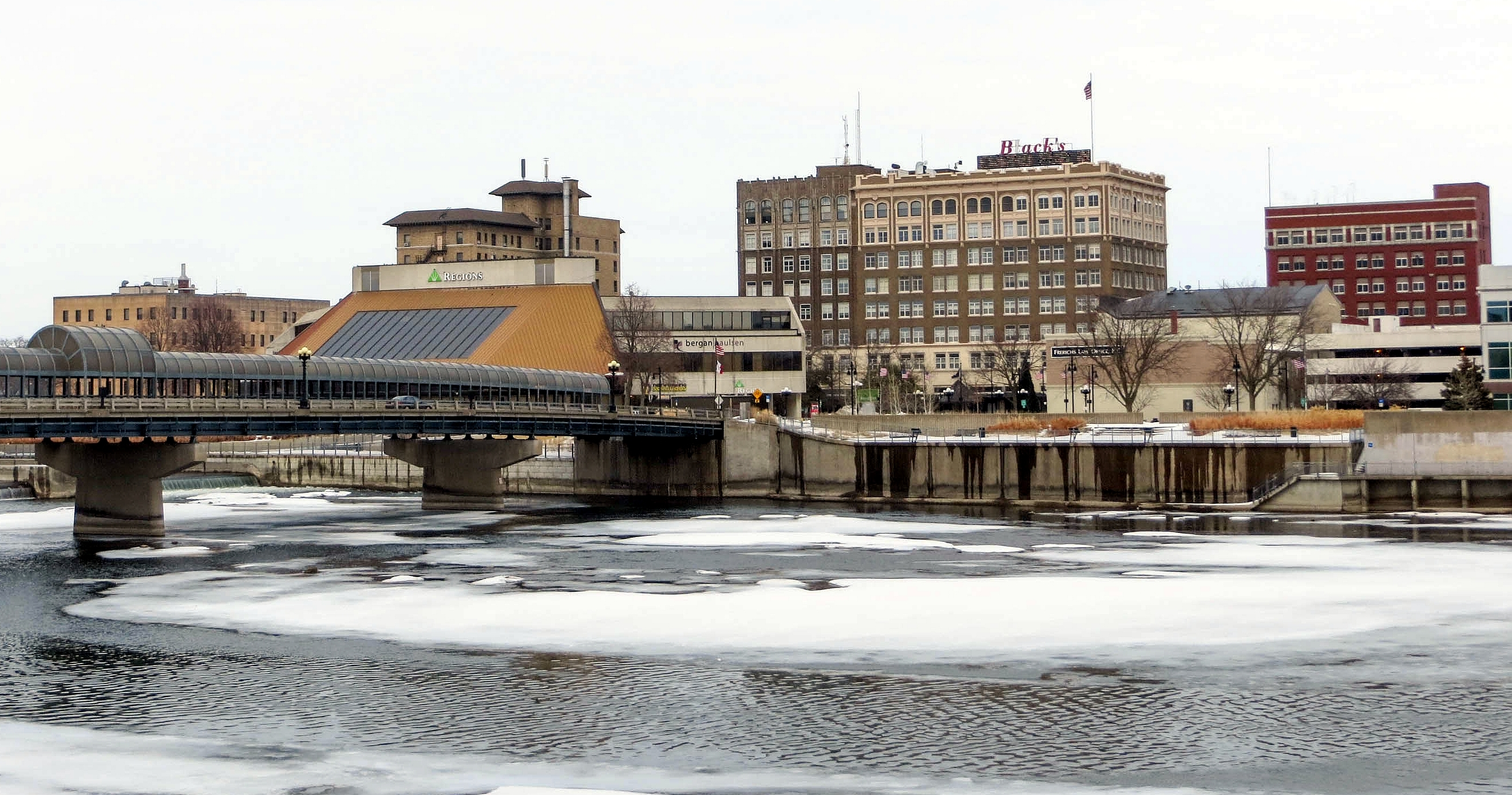
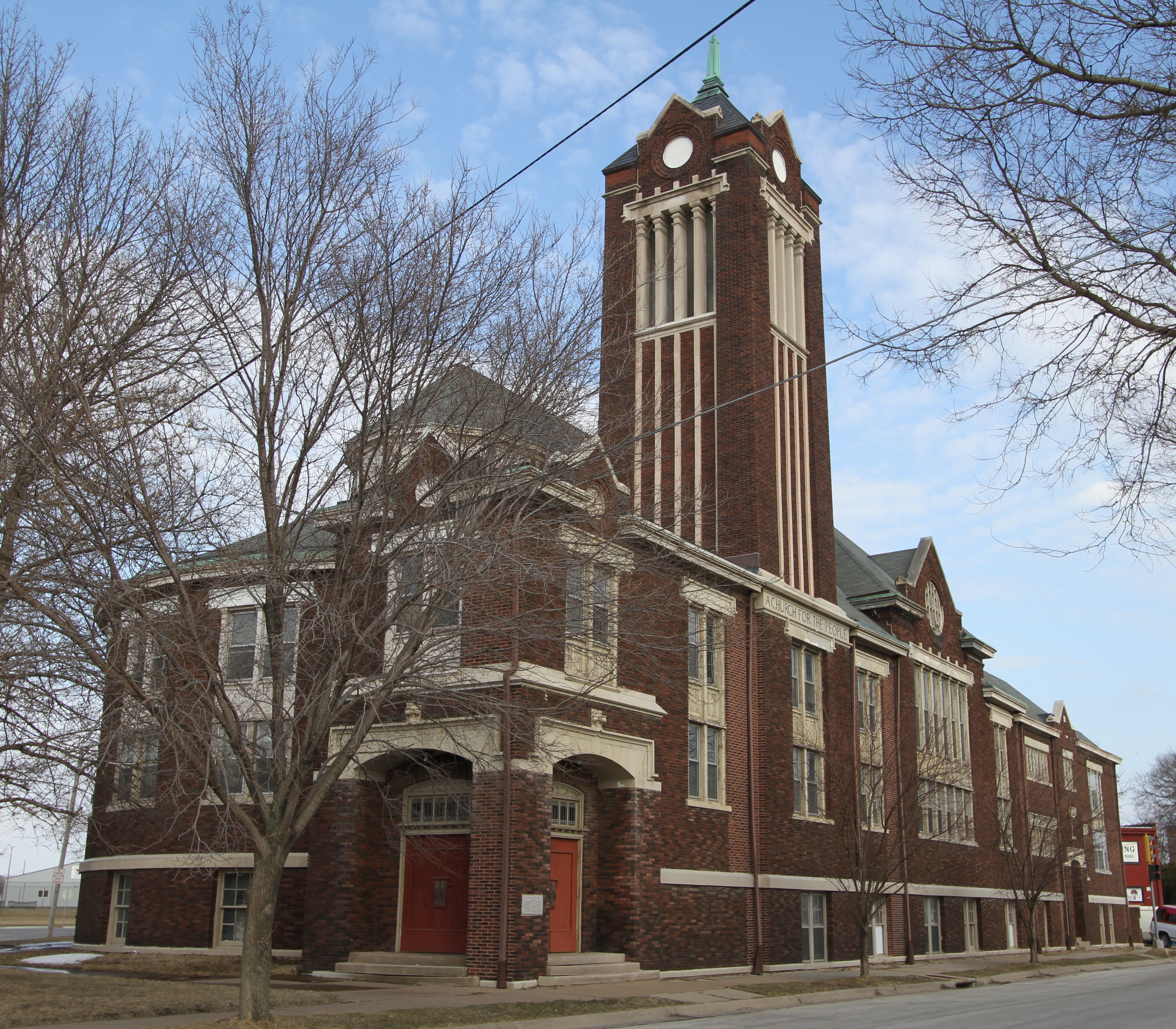
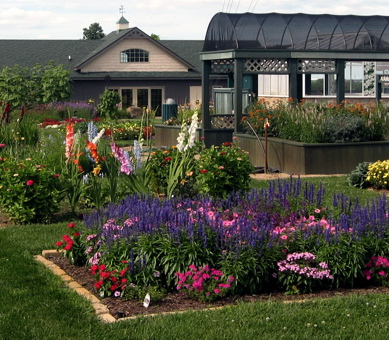
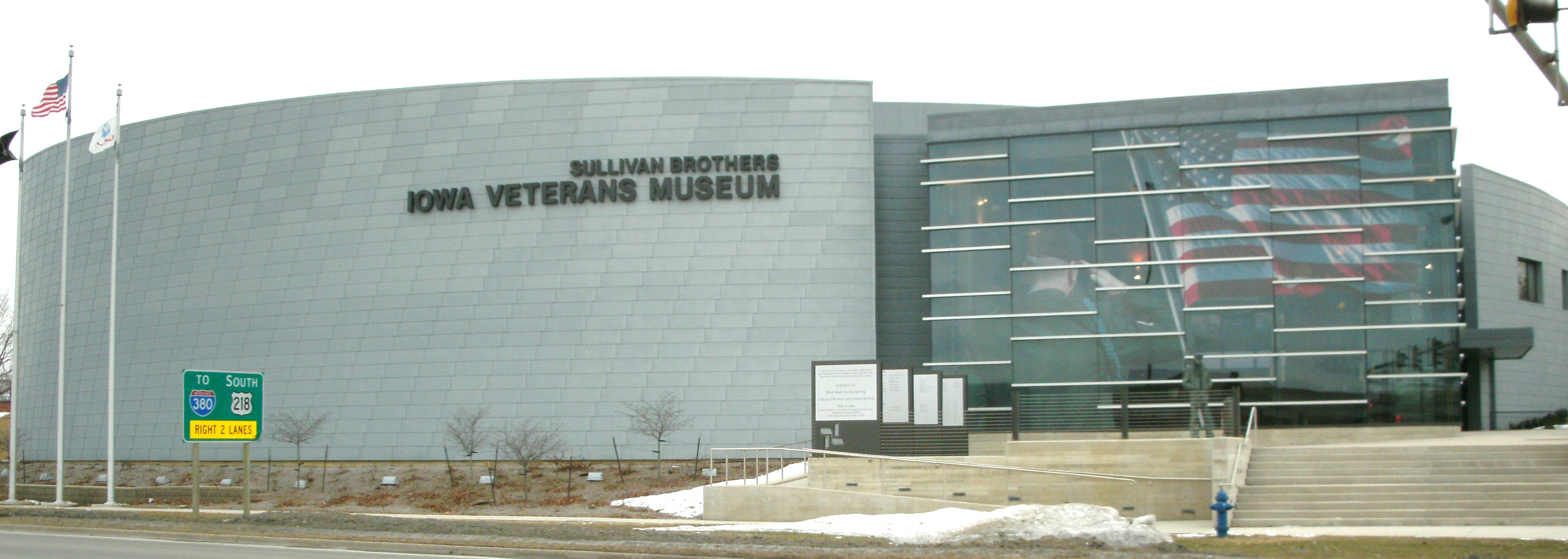
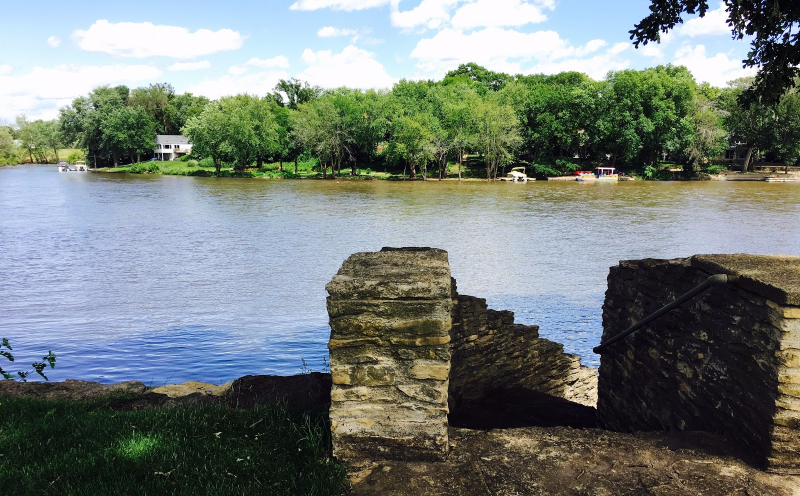
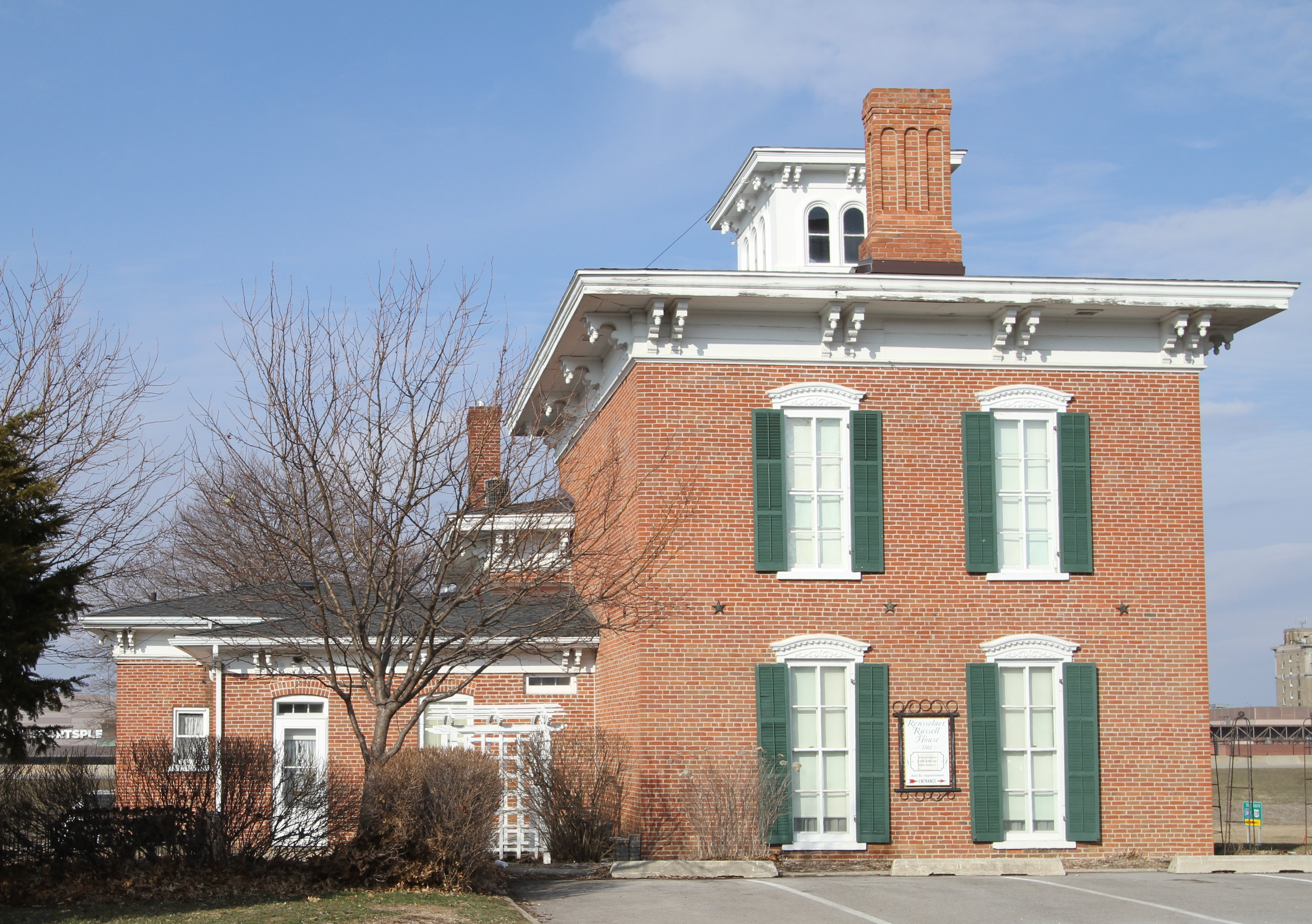
- Downtown Waterloo and the Cedar River Walnut Street Baptist Church Cedar Valley Arboretum Sullivan Brothers Iowa Veterans Museum at the Grout Museum District Sans Souci Island Rensselaer Russell House

- Flag Seal

- Location within Black Hawk County and Iowa

- Location within Iowa Location within the United States
- Coordinates: 42°30′50″N 92°20′46″W
- Country: US
- State: Iowa
- County: Black Hawk
- Incorporated: 1868

Area
  - City: 63.43 sq mi (164.29 km^{2})
  - Land: 61.59 sq mi (159.53 km^{2})
  - Water: 1.84 sq mi (4.76 km^{2})
- Elevation: 883 ft (269 m)

Population (2020)
  - City: 67,314
  - Rank: 8th in Iowa
  - Density: 1,092.8/sq mi (421.95/km^{2})
  - Metro: 169,895
- Time zone: UTC−06:00 (CST)
  - Summer (DST): UTC−05:00 (CDT)
- ZIP codes: 50701-50707
- Area code: 319
- FIPS code: 19-82425
- GNIS ID: 468951
- Website: cityofwaterlooiowa.com

Waterloo is a city in and the county seat of Black Hawk County, Iowa, United States. It is the eighth-most populous city in Iowa, with a population of 67,314 at the 2020 census. Waterloo comprises a twin conurbation with neighboring municipality Cedar Falls, and is the larger of the two cities. The Waterloo – Cedar Falls metropolitan area has an estimated 170,000 residents. Waterloo is bisected into eastern and western halves by the Cedar River flowing southeastward.

Waterloo is a major manufacturing, commercial, and cultural center in Northeast Iowa. John Deere, a brand renowned for its tractors, engines, and other agricultural machinery, has been manufacturing its products in the city for over a century. Locally known as the “Factory City,” Waterloo has played a significant role in the production of these important agricultural tools since 1893. That year, the Waterloo Gasoline Engine Company began producing the first gasoline-powered tractor, which later became known as the “Waterloo Boy” brand. The city has been designated as a World War II Heritage City by the National Park Service, and is home to the headquarters of the Silos and Smokestacks National Heritage Area.

== History ==
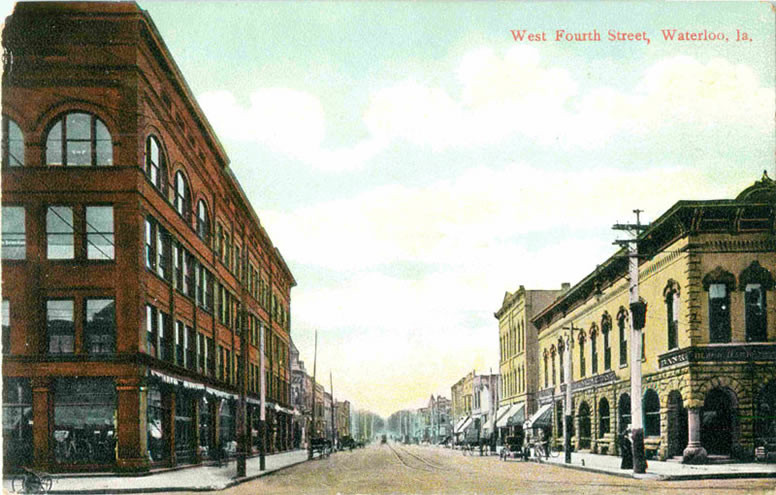
West Fourth Street, 1910

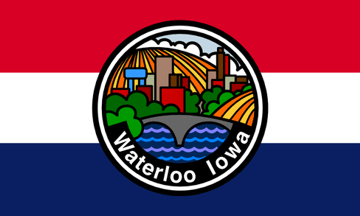
Flag of Waterloo (until 2022)

Waterloo was originally known as Prairie Rapids Crossing. The town was established near two Meskwaki American tribal seasonal camps alongside the Cedar River. It was first settled in 1845 when George and Mary Melrose Hanna and their children arrived on the east bank of the Red Cedar River (now just called the Cedar River). They were followed by the Virden and Mullan families in 1846. Evidence of these earliest families can still be found in the street names Hanna Boulevard, Mullan Avenue and Virden Creek.

On December 8, 1845, the Iowa State Register and Waterloo Herald was the first newspaper published in Waterloo.

The name Waterloo supplanted the original name, Prairie Rapids Crossing, shortly after Charles Mullan petitioned for a post office in the town. Since the signed petition did not include the name of the proposed post office location, Mullan was charged with selecting the name when he submitted the petition. Tradition has it that as he flipped through a list of other post offices in the United States, he came upon the name Waterloo. The name struck his fancy, and a post office was established under that name. There were two extended periods of rapid growth over the next 115 years. From 1895 to 1915, the population increased from 8,490 to 33,097, a 290% increase. From 1925 to 1960, population increased from 36,771 to 71,755. The 1895 to 1915 period was a time of rapid growth in manufacturing, rail transportation and wholesale operations. During this period the Waterloo Gasoline Traction Engine Company moved to Waterloo and, shortly after, the Rath Packing Company moved from Dubuque. Another major employer throughout the first two-thirds of the 20th century was the Illinois Central Railroad. Among the others was the less-successful brass era automobile manufacturer, the Maytag-Mason Motor Company.

On June 7, 1934, bank robber Tommy Carroll had a shootout with the FBI when he and his wife stopped to pick up gas. Accidentally parking next to a police car and wasting time dropping his gun and picking it back up, Carroll was forced to flee into an alley, where he was shot. He was taken to Allen Memorial Hospital in Waterloo, where he soon died.

Waterloo suffered in the agricultural recession of the 1980s; its major employers at the time were heavily rooted in agriculture. John Deere, the area's largest employer, cut 10,000 jobs, and the Rath meatpacking plant closed altogether, losing 2,500 jobs. It is estimated that Waterloo lost 14% of its population during this time. Today the city enjoys a broader industrial base, as city leaders have sought to diversify its industrial and commercial mix. John Deere remains a large employer for Waterloo, but employs only roughly one-third the number of people it did at its peak. Layoffs in 2024 and 2025 further reduced John Deere's presence in the city.

=== African American community ===
In 1910, black railroad workers were brought in as strikebreakers to the Waterloo area. Black workers were relegated to 20 square blocks in Waterloo, an area that remains the east side to this day. In 1940, more black strikebreakers were brought in to work in the Rath meat plant. In 1948, a black strikebreaker killed a white union member. Instead of a race riot, a strike ensued against the Rath Company. The National Guard was called in to end the 73-day strike.

==== Civil rights ====
United Packinghouse Workers of America became the main union of the Rath Company, welcoming black workers, but United Auto Workers Local 838 continued to refuse black members. With the power of the union, Anna Mae Weems, Ada Treadwell, Charles Pearson and Jimmy Porter formed an anti-discrimination department at Rath by the 1950s. This department helped organize protests against local places that discriminated against blacks.

Porter would go on to organize the first black radio station in Waterloo, KBBG, in 1978. Weems became the head of the anti-discrimination department and local NAACP chapter.

On May 31, 1966, Eddie Wallace Sallis was found dead in the local jail. The black community felt the death was suspicious, and protests were held. On June 4, Weems led a march on city hall to encourage investigation into his death. The march led to the creation of the Waterloo Human Rights Commission, which lasted only a year due to lack of funding.

On Sept. 7, 1967, a city report, "Waterloo's Unfinished Business", was released. The report covered the ongoing problems in housing, education and employment faced by Waterloo's black community. It confirmed the housing bias faced by black residents, that many of the schools were generally 80% of one race, and that 80% of black residents held service jobs. In a 2007 article, the Courier covered some changes in the 40 years since, finding that housing was now mostly divided by socioeconomic status, schools still violated the desegregation plan, and black unemployment was still double that of white residents.

The Iowa Supreme Court outlawed school segregation in 1868. A 1967 commission found most schools were still segregated and recommended immediate desegregation, which Mayor Lloyd Turner opposed. In 1969, the Waterloo school board voted to allow open enrollment in all their schools to encourage integration. Many parents felt it was not enough. Despite the efforts between 1967 and 1970, already-black schools in the area increased in their segregation.

==== Protests and riots ====
By the 1960s, Rath was declining and jobs there were harder to come by. A federal government program trained 1,200 local youths with the promise of summer jobs, only to hire two as bricklayers. Starting in the summer months of 1966, Waterloo was subject to riots over race relations between the white community and the black community. Many white residents expressed confusion as to why riots were occurring in Waterloo, while younger black residents felt they were being treated unfairly, as their conditions seemed worse than those of their white neighbors. In 1967, the black population of Waterloo was equivalent to 8%, and according to the Courier, had a 4% unemployment rate. Waterloo was segregated at the time, as 95% of its black population lived in "East" Waterloo. While the white community felt East High was integrated with a 45% black student body, the black community pointed out that the elementary school in East Waterloo had only one white pupil.

Protests were mostly organized by black youths aged 16–25. Protests became riots when the youth felt protesting wasn't effective. Protests turned into riots in July 1968 and reached a critical mass by September, with buildings on East 4th street torched and vandalized.

In August 1968, East High students Terri and Kathy Pearson gave the principal a list of grievances detailing how they felt the discrimination could be lessened. The principal refused to implement any of the requested changes. Student protests and walkouts continued through September. Students were angry that no African American history course was being taught, and that interracial dating was discouraged by teachers and administrators.

On September 13, 1968, during an East High School football game, police attempted to arrest a black youth. He resisted arrest, drawing attention of students in the stands. Black students fought and argued with the police, and police responded by using clubs and mace. The riot continued into the east side of Waterloo, with a subsequent fire that claimed a lumber mill and three homes. There was an attempt to set East High on fire as well. The riot lasted until midnight and resulted in seven officers injured and thirteen youths jailed. The National Guard was called in the following day. The riots were called off and a solution was reached thanks to civil rights leader William G Parker.

==== 21st century ====
In 2003, Governor Tom Vilsack created a task force to close the racial achievement gap in Waterloo. In 2009, a fair housing report, "Analysis of Impediments to Fair Housing Choice", compiled by Mullin & Lonergan Associates Inc., found Waterloo to be Iowa's most segregated city. "Historical patterns of racial segregation persist in Waterloo. Of the 20 cities in Iowa with populations exceeding 25,000, Waterloo ranks as the most segregated".

Many activists who participated in the original protests feel that Waterloo has remained the same. In 2015, The Huffington Post listed Waterloo as the 10th worst city for black Americans. The site noted that the city's black residents have a 24% unemployment rate compared to 3.9% for whites, giving Waterloo one of the highest black unemployment rates among Midwest cities. Waterloo still has a higher percentage of blacks than most Iowa cities.

In December 2012, Derrick Ambrose Jr. was shot by a police officer. Ambrose's family maintains he was unarmed, while the officer stated that he felt his life was in danger. A grand jury acquitted the officer. The shooting sparked outrage in the community.

===== Flood of 2008 =====
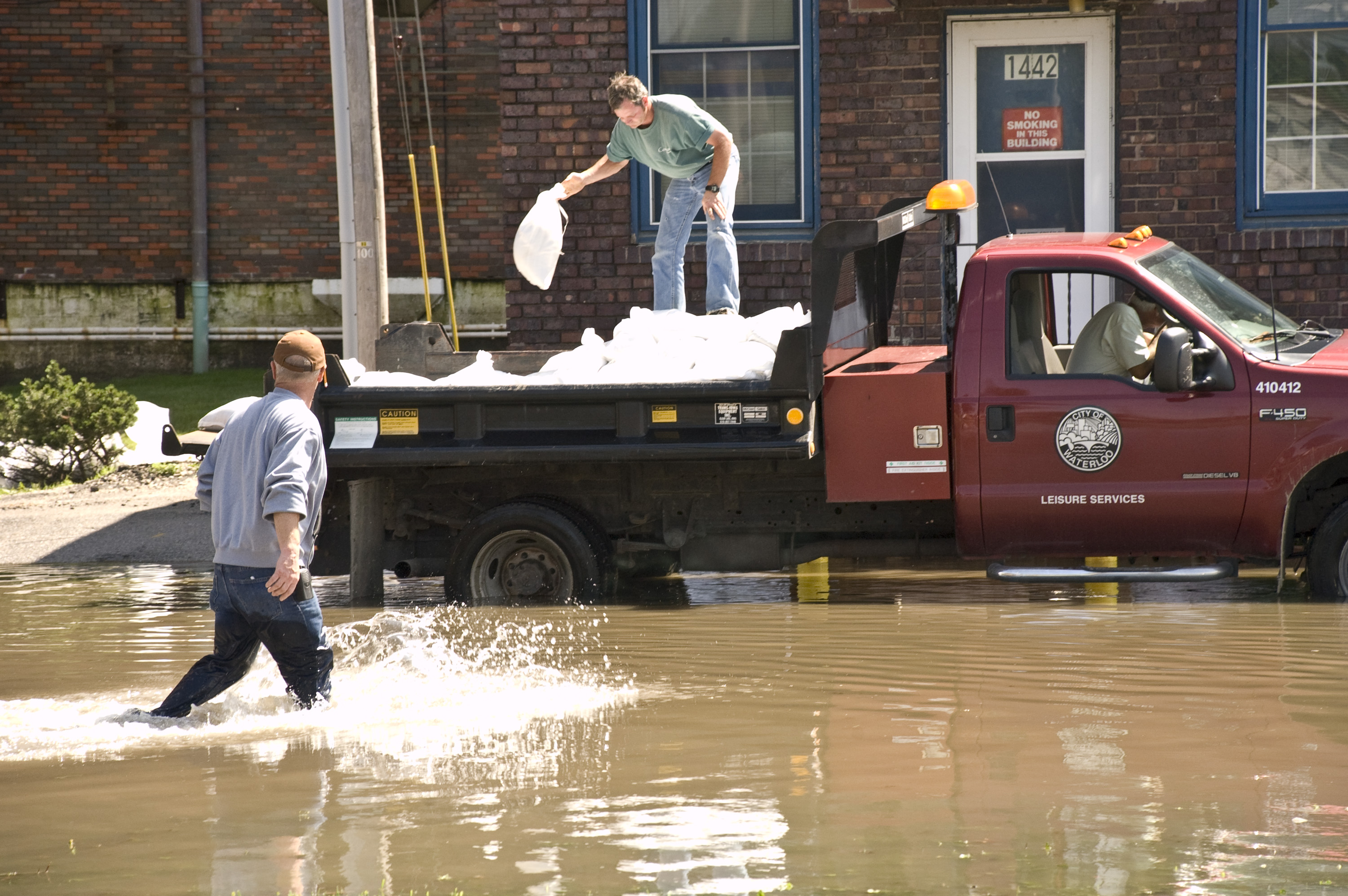
Waterloo after the June 2008 flood

June 2008 saw the worst flooding the Waterloo – Cedar Falls area had ever recorded; other major floods include the Great Flood of 1993. The flood control system constructed in the 1970s–90s largely functioned as designed.Belles, G.L.; Nguyen, K.T. (2010). Floods of May 30 to June 15, 2008, in the Iowa River and Cedar River Basins, Eastern Iowa (Report). Open-File Report 2010-1190. United States Geological Survey. "Within the Cedar River Basin, the May 30 to June 15, 2008, flood is the largest on record at all six streamgages in Iowa located on the mainstem of the Cedar River... Peak discharges of 112,000 cubic feet per second... at the Cedar River at Waterloo, Iowa streamgage on June 11."

== Geography ==
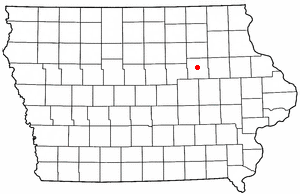
Location of Waterloo, Iowa

According to the United States Census Bureau, the city has a total area of 63.23 square miles (163.76 km^{2}), of which 61.39 square miles (159.00 km^{2}) is land and 1.84 square miles (4.77 km^{2}) is water.

The average elevation of Waterloo is 846 feet above sea level. The population density is 1101 people per square mile, considered low for an urban area.

=== Climate ===
Waterloo has a humid continental climate zone (Köppen classification Dfa), typical of the state of Iowa, and is part of USDA Plant Hardiness zone 5a. The normal monthly mean temperature ranges from 18.5 °F (−7.5 °C) in January to 73.6 °F (23.1 °C) in July. On average, there are 22 nights annually with a low at or below 0 °F (−18 °C), 58 days annually with a high at or below freezing, and 16 days with a high at or above 90 °F (32 °C). As the mean first and last occurrence of freezing temperatures is October 1 and April 29, respectively, this allows for a growing season of 154 days. Temperature records range from −34 °F (−37 °C) on March 1, 1962, and January 16, 2009, up to 112 °F (44 °C) on July 13 and 14, 1936, during the Dust Bowl. The record cold daily maximum is −16 °F (−27 °C) on February 2, 1996, while conversely the record warm daily minimum is 80 °F (27 °C) on July 31, 1917, and August 16, 1988.

Climate chart for Waterloo

Normal annual precipitation equivalent is 34.60 inches (879 mm) spread over an average of 112 days, with heavier rainfall in spring and summer, but observed annual rainfall has ranged from 17.35 to 53.07 inches (441 to 1,348 mm) in 1910 and 1993, respectively. The wettest month on record is July 1999 with 12.82 inches (326 mm); on the 2nd of that month, 5.49 inches (139 mm) of rain fell, making for the heaviest rainfall in a single calendar day. The driest months are October 1952 and November 1954 with trace amounts in each month.

Winter snowfall is moderate, and averages 35.3 inches (90 cm) per season, spread over an average of 27 days, and snow cover of 1 inch (2.5 cm) or more is seen on 67 days, mostly from December to March. Winter snowfall has ranged from 11.6 inches (29.5 cm) in 1967–68 to 68.5 inches (174.0 cm) in 1904–05. The most snow in a calendar day and month is 13.2 and 33.9 inches (33.5 and 86.1 cm) on January 3, 1971, and in December 2000, respectively.

Climate data for Waterloo Regional Airport (1991–2020 normals, (Note: Mean monthly maxima and minima (i.e. the expected highest and lowest temperature readings at any point during the year or given month) calculated based on data at said location from 1991 to 2020.) extremes 1895–present)
Month	Jan	Feb	Mar	Apr	May	Jun	Jul	Aug	Sep	Oct	Nov	Dec	Year
Record high °F (°C)	65 (18)	78 (26)	87 (31)	100 (38)	108 (42)	107 (42)	112 (44)	110 (43)	102 (39)	95 (35)	83 (28)	74 (23)	112 (44)
Mean maximum °F (°C)	47.5 (8.6)	51.7 (10.9)	70.5 (21.4)	82.7 (28.2)	88.8 (31.6)	93.3 (34.1)	94.3 (34.6)	91.7 (33.2)	90.6 (32.6)	82.9 (28.3)	67.5 (19.7)	51.5 (10.8)	95.9 (35.5)
Mean daily maximum °F (°C)	28.2 (−2.1)	32.6 (0.3)	46.5 (8.1)	60.9 (16.1)	72.8 (22.7)	82.2 (27.9)	85.0 (29.4)	82.9 (28.3)	76.8 (24.9)	63.0 (17.2)	47.1 (8.4)	33.7 (0.9)	59.3 (15.2)
Daily mean °F (°C)	19.4 (−7.0)	23.9 (−4.5)	36.7 (2.6)	49.4 (9.7)	61.5 (16.4)	71.5 (21.9)	74.5 (23.6)	71.9 (22.2)	64.6 (18.1)	51.6 (10.9)	37.4 (3.0)	25.3 (−3.7)	49.0 (9.4)
Mean daily minimum °F (°C)	10.7 (−11.8)	15.2 (−9.3)	26.9 (−2.8)	37.9 (3.3)	50.2 (10.1)	60.8 (16.0)	64.0 (17.8)	61.0 (16.1)	52.4 (11.3)	40.2 (4.6)	27.7 (−2.4)	17.0 (−8.3)	38.7 (3.7)
Mean minimum °F (°C)	−16.0 (−26.7)	−9.8 (−23.2)	2.2 (−16.6)	20.4 (−6.4)	32.9 (0.5)	45.7 (7.6)	51.2 (10.7)	48.2 (9.0)	34.7 (1.5)	21.5 (−5.8)	7.9 (−13.4)	−7.3 (−21.8)	−19.6 (−28.7)
Record low °F (°C)	−34 (−37)	−31 (−35)	−34 (−37)	−4 (−20)	22 (−6)	33 (1)	42 (6)	33 (1)	19 (−7)	0 (−18)	−17 (−27)	−29 (−34)	−34 (−37)
Average precipitation inches (mm)	1.10 (28)	1.14 (29)	1.98 (50)	4.04 (103)	4.61 (117)	5.72 (145)	4.34 (110)	4.17 (106)	3.14 (80)	2.76 (70)	1.85 (47)	1.44 (37)	36.29 (922)
Average snowfall inches (cm)	10.1 (26)	9.3 (24)	4.6 (12)	1.7 (4.3)	0.1 (0.25)	0.0 (0.0)	0.0 (0.0)	0.0 (0.0)	0.0 (0.0)	0.3 (0.76)	3.1 (7.9)	9.9 (25)	39.1 (99)
Average precipitation days (≥ 0.01 in)	8.1	8.0	10.1	11.5	12.9	11.8	8.9	8.8	8.7	8.5	8.1	8.4	113.8
Average snowy days (≥ 0.1 in)	6.8	6.3	3.2	1.1	0.1	0.0	0.0	0.0	0.0	0.4	2.5	6.2	26.6
Average relative humidity (%)	73.0	73.8	72.7	66.4	65.7	67.7	71.9	73.7	73.7	69.9	74.8	77.2	71.8
Average dew point °F (°C)	14.0 (−10.0)	18.9 (−7.3)	30.4 (−0.9)	42.1 (5.6)	52.9 (11.6)	62.1 (16.7)	66.4 (19.1)	64.0 (17.8)	56.1 (13.4)	45.0 (7.2)	32.7 (0.4)	19.6 (−6.9)	42.0 (5.6)
Source: NOAA (relative humidity and dew point 1961–1990)

== Demographics ==
Historical population
Census	Pop.	Note	%±
1870	4,337		—
1880	5,630		29.8%
1890	6,674		18.5%
1900	12,580		88.5%
1910	26,693		112.2%
1920	36,230		35.7%
1930	46,191		27.5%
1940	51,743		12.0%
1950	65,198		26.0%
1960	71,755		10.1%
1970	75,533		5.3%
1980	75,985		0.6%
1990	66,467		−12.5%
2000	68,747		3.4%
2010	68,406		−0.5%
2020	67,314		−1.6%
Iowa Data Center

=== Racial and ethnic composition ===
Waterloo, Iowa – Racial and ethnic composition Note: the US Census treats Hispanic/Latino as an ethnic category. This table excludes Latinos from the racial categories and assigns them to a separate category. Hispanics/Latinos may be of any race.
Race / Ethnicity (NH = Non-Hispanic)	Pop 2000	Pop 2010	Pop 2020	% 2000	% 2010	% 2020
White alone (NH)	55,419	51,254	44,321	80.61%	74.93%	65.84%
Black or African American alone (NH)	9,468	10,488	12,031	13.77%	15.33%	17.87%
Native American or Alaska Native alone (NH)	132	145	145	0.19%	0.21%	0.22%
Asian alone (NH)	581	710	2,016	0.85%	1.04%	2.99%
Pacific Islander alone (NH)	29	171	707	0.04%	0.25%	1.05%
Other race alone (NH)	136	94	223	0.20%	0.14%	0.33%
Mixed race or Multiracial (NH)	1,176	1,717	3,078	1.71%	2.51%	4.57%
Hispanic or Latino (any race)	1,806	3,827	4,793	2.63%	5.59%	7.12%
Total	68,747	68,406	67,314	100.00%	100.00%	100.00%

Bosnian Americans live in Waterloo, many of whom came as refugees during the Bosnian War.

=== 2020 census ===
As of the 2020 census, Waterloo had a population of 67,314 and a population density of 1,092.8 inhabitants per square mile (421.9/km^{2}). There were 31,603 housing units at an average density of 513.1 units per square mile (198.1 units/km^{2}), of which 8.4% were vacant; the homeowner vacancy rate was 1.9% and the rental vacancy rate was 9.4%.

There were 28,962 households in Waterloo, of which 27.2% had children under the age of 18 living in them. Of all households, 36.5% were married-couple households, 22.6% were households with a male householder and no spouse or partner present, and 32.4% were households with a female householder and no spouse or partner present. About 35.3% of all households were made up of individuals, and 13.1% had someone living alone who was 65 years of age or older.

The median age was 37.4 years. 23.1% of residents were under the age of 18 and 17.1% were 65 years of age or older. For every 100 females there were 95.3 males, and for every 100 females age 18 and over there were 93.2 males age 18 and over. About 97.0% of residents lived in urban areas, while 3.0% lived in rural areas.

Racial composition as of the 2020 census
Race	Number	Percent
White	45,460	67.5%
Black or African American	12,150	18.0%
American Indian and Alaska Native	317	0.5%
Asian	2,020	3.0%
Native Hawaiian and Other Pacific Islander	712	1.1%
Some other race	2,252	3.3%
Two or more races	4,403	6.5%
Hispanic or Latino (of any race)	4,793	7.1%

=== 2010 census ===
As of the census of 2010, there were 68,406 people, 28,607 households, 17,233 families residing in the city. The population density was 1,114.3 inhabitants per square mile (430.2/km^{2}). There were 30,723 housing units at an average density of 500.5 units per square mile (193.2 units/km^{2}). The racial makeup of the city was 77.3% White, 15.5% African American, 0.3% Native American, 1.1% Asian, 0.3% Pacific Islander, 2.6% from other races, and 3.0% from two or more races. Hispanic or Latino people of any race were 5.6% of the population.

There were 28,607 households, of which 29.9% had children under the age of 18 living with them, 40.3% were married couples living together, 14.9% had a female householder with no husband present, 5.1% had a male householder with no wife present, and 39.8% were non-families. 31.6% of all households were made up of individuals, and 11.2% had someone living alone who was 65 years of age or older. The average household size was 2.35 and the average family size was 2.95.

The median age in the city was 35.9 years. 23.7% of residents were under the age of 18; 10.4% were between the ages of 18 and 24; 26.4% were from 25 to 44; 25.5% were from 45 to 64; and 14% were 65 years of age or older. The gender makeup of the city was 48.4% male and 51.6% female.

=== Metropolitan area ===
The Waterloo-Cedar Falls Metropolitan Statistical Area consists of Black Hawk, Bremer, and Grundy counties. The area had a 2000 census population of 163,706 and a 2008 estimated population of 164,220.

Waterloo is next to Cedar Falls, home to the University of Northern Iowa. Small suburbs include Evansdale, Hudson, Raymond, Elk Run Heights, Gilbertville, and Washburn.

The largest employers in the Waterloo/Cedar Falls MSA, according to the Cedar Valley Regional Partnership of Iowa, as of 2021 include (in order): John Deere, Tyson Fresh Meats, the University of Northern Iowa, Omega Cabinetry, Bertch Cabinet, Target Regional Distribution Center, Croell Redi Mix, Cuna Mutrual, and CBE Companies.

== Economy ==
Waterloo has an economy currently based in agricultural manufacturing, healthcare, meatpacking, education, banking, and tourism. Large national corporations with locations in the Waterloo area include John Deere, MercyOne, UnityPoint, Tyson Foods, Ferguson Enterprises, and Masterbrand Cabinets which is a subsidiary of Fortune Brands Innovations. Large locally owned businesses and public employers include the City of Waterloo, Black Hawk County, Hawkeye Community College, Veridian Credit Union, Isle Casino, and Lost Island Theme Park and Waterpark. Other major employers located in adjoining Cedar Falls but within the combined metropolitan area include the University of Northern Iowa, Cedar Falls Community Schools, CBE Companies, Inc., a Target Distribution Center, and Viking Pump.

Waterloo Major Employers: Source- Grow Cedar Valley 2025
Waterloo Employer	Product/Services	Employees
John Deere	Agricultural Equipment	4,300
UnityPoint	Health Care	3,805
Tyson Foods	Food Manufacturer	2,969
MercyOne	Health Care	2,392
Waterloo Community Schools	Education	1,750
Masterbrand Cabinets	Bath & Kitchen Cabinets	1,118
Hawkeye Community College	Education	724
City of Waterloo	City Government	711
Veridian Credit Union	Financial Institution	702
Isle Casino Hotel- Waterloo	Casino-Hotel	600
Cedar Valley Medical Specialists	Healthcare	440
ConAgra	Food Manufacturer	246
Lincoln Savings Bank	Financial Institution	235

== Arts and culture ==
The Cedar Valley Arboretum & Botanic Gardens is a 40-acre (16 ha) public garden located directly east of Hawkeye Community College. Admission is $5/adult and $2/child, under five and members are free.

The tropically themed Lost Island Waterpark, which opened in 2001, has regularly been featured in USA Today's Top 10 waterparks in the United States listings. It was joined in 2022 by Lost Island Theme Park, which received industry awards recognition for its interactive dark ride Volkanu: Quest for the Golden Idol.

The Iowa Irish Fest is held in Waterloo in early August, and the National Cattle Congress is held there in September.

=== Silos & Smokestacks National Heritage Area ===
Silos & Smokestacks National Heritage Area (SSNHA) preserves and tells the story of American agriculture and its global significance through partnerships and activities that celebrate the land, people, and communities of the area. SSNHA is one of 62 federally designated National Heritage Areas and is an Affiliated Area of the National Park Service. Through the development of a network of 113 partner sites, programs and events, SSNHA's mission is to interpret farm life, agribusiness and rural communities-past and present. Waterloo partner sites include the Waterloo Center for the Arts and the Grout Museum. The SSNHA office is located in the Fowler Building, Suite 2, 604 Lafayette Street.

=== Waterloo Center for the Arts ===
The Waterloo Center for the Arts (WCA) is a regional center for visual and performance arts. It is owned and operated by the City of Waterloo with oversight by the advisory Waterloo Cultural and Arts Commission. The center is located at 225 Commercial Street. It is also an anchor for the Waterloo Cultural and Arts District (a State of Iowa designation).

The permanent collection at the WCA includes the largest collection of Haitian art in the country, Midwest Regionalist art (including works by Grant Wood and Thomas Hart Benton), Mexican folk art, international folk art, American decorative arts, and public art.

President Barack Obama gave a speech here on August 14, 2012, during the 2012 presidential campaign. Originally scheduled for 7:45 pm, the speech was delayed by about 15 minutes, when Obama made an unannounced stop in neighboring Cedar Falls for a beer at a pub.

Included in the WCA is the Phelps Youth Pavilion (PYP), which opened in 2009. The PYP is an interactive children's museum. PYP provides additional gallery and studio space.

The Riverloop Amphitheater, completed in 2011, is an outdoor plaza and amphitheater available to rent for events and weddings. The Riverloop Amphitheater also is home to Mark's Park, a water park playground open to the public.

The WCA also houses the Waterloo Community Playhouse, the oldest community theatre in Iowa (operating since 1916), and the Black Hawk Children's Theatre, that started in 1964, then, merged with the Waterloo Community Playhouse in 1982. Both perform in the Hope Martin Theatre, which opened in 1965. The theatre's administrative offices are located across the street in the historic Walker Building.

=== Grout Museum District ===
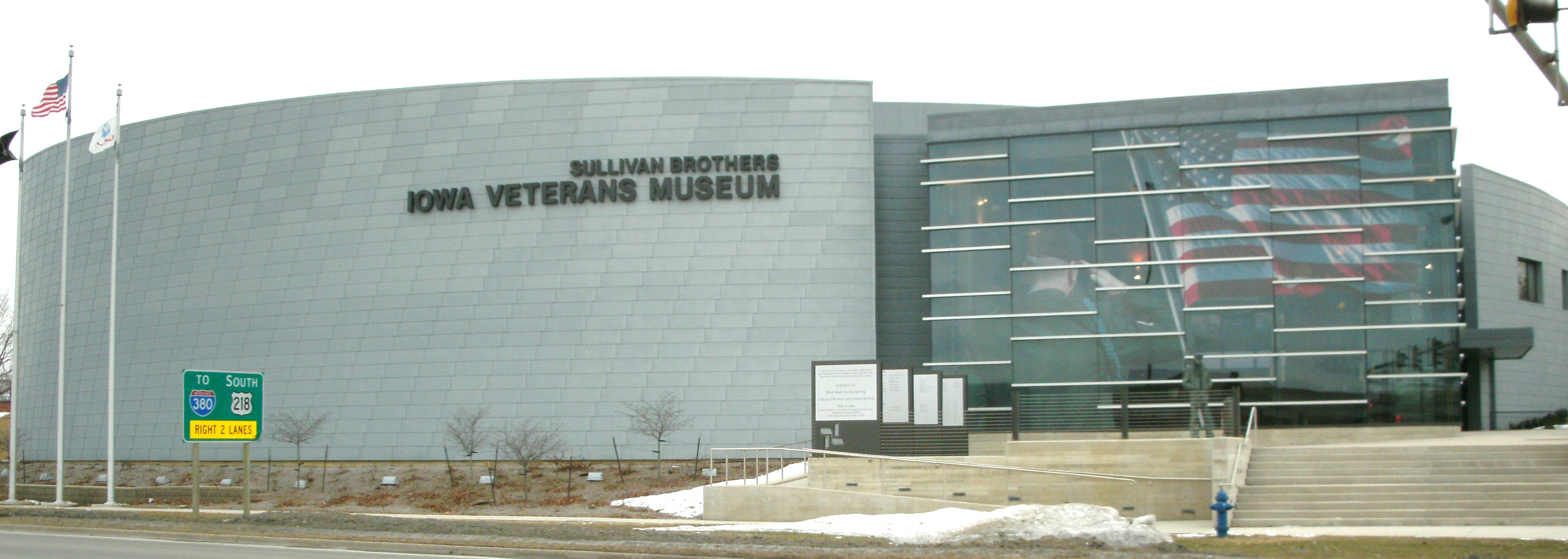
Sullivan Brothers Iowa Veterans Museum (2011)

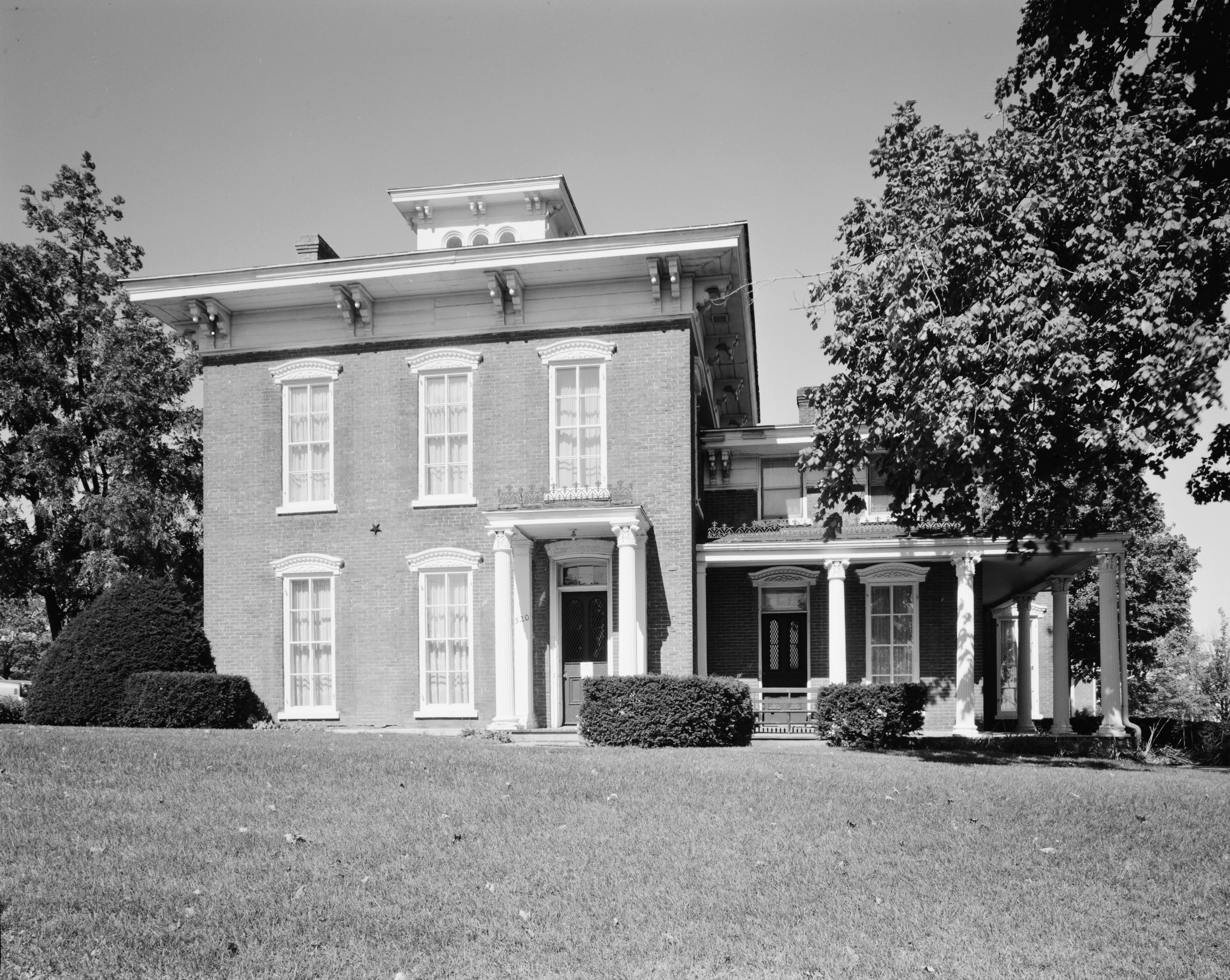
Rensselaer Russell House (1973)

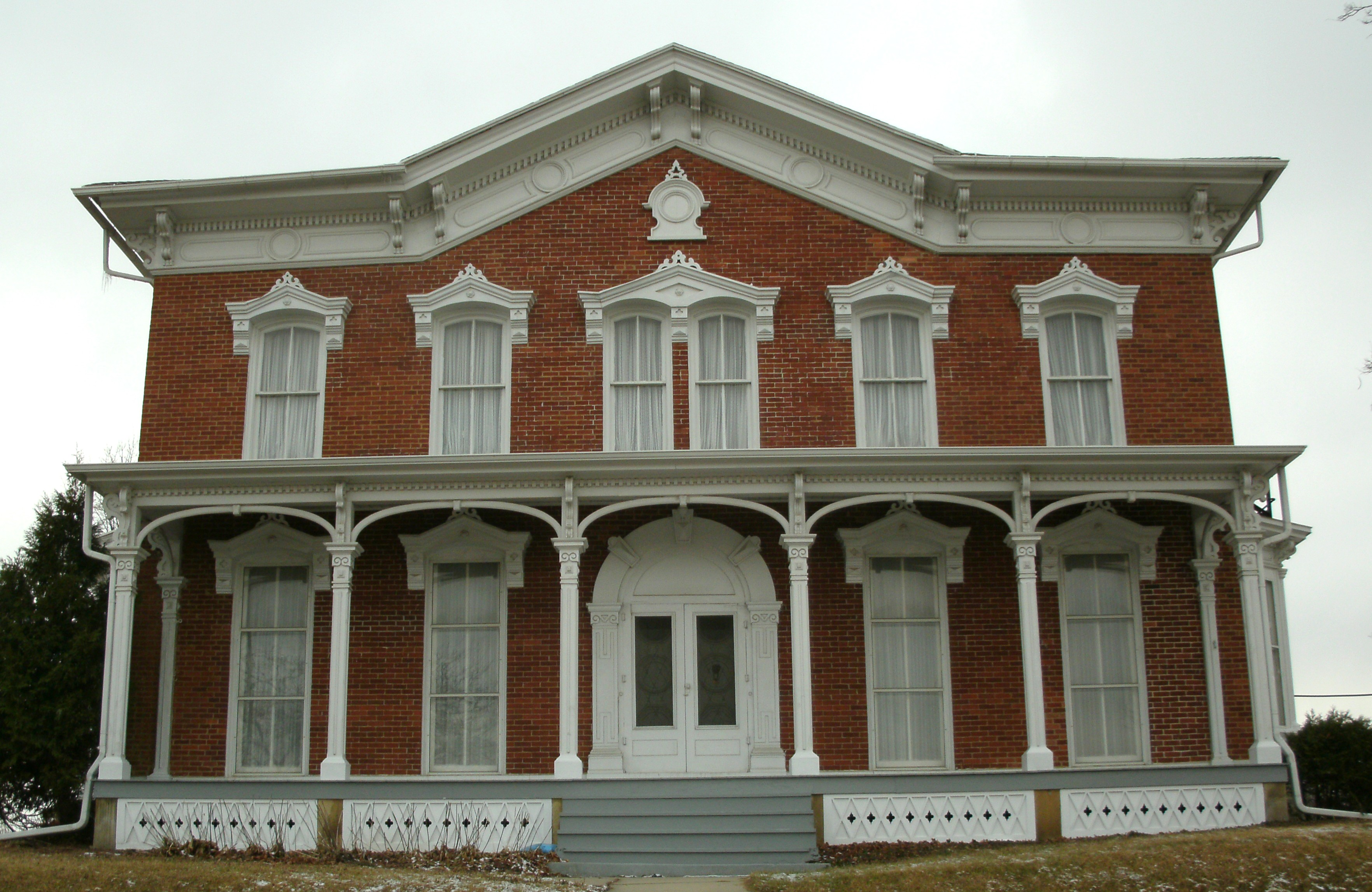
Snowden House (February 2011)

Established in 1932, the district started with an endowment set up in the will of Henry W. Grout. The district is a nonprofit educational entity that is active in engaging the students and all people from the surrounding communities. It is accredited by the American Alliance of Museums.

The Grout Museum of History and Science, the first museum which would grow into the museum district, was displayed for many years in the building that was the local YMCA. The current building was completed and opened to the public as a not-for-profit museum in 1956.

The Sullivan Brothers Iowa Veterans Museum was opened in November 2008 at a cost of $11 million, funded in part by a citizens' grassroots campaign.

The Rensselaer Russell House is at 520 W. 3rd Street. Built in 1858, it is listed on the National Register of Historic Places. Rensselaer and Caroline Russell built the house utilizing Italianate architecture in 1861 for $5,878.83.

The Carl A. and Peggy J. Bluedorn Science Imaginarium opened in 1993 and provides both interactive exhibits and formal demonstrations in various fields of science. The building closed on October 4, 2025 after the Grout Museum Districts says the facility has become "financially unsustainable, especially with the lost of levy funding." With this change, the children's science center was moved to the Grout Museum building.

The Snowden House is a two-story brick Victorian era house listed on the National Register of Historic Places was built in 1875. The house was once used as the Waterloo Woman's Club.

=== Library ===
Waterloo has one central public library which serves thousands of community members annually, providing materials, librarian assistance, public computers and Wi-Fi. A detailed look at library usage, services, and collections, can be found here.

The library is governed by a board of trustees board of trustees, nominated by the city mayor and confirmed by the city council.

The Waterloo Public Library is in a renovated Great Depression era building that served as a post office and federal building. The building was renovated in the late 1970s for use as a library. In 2021, the Waterloo Public Library celebrated 40 years at its Commercial Street location.

Two New Deal-funded murals by artist Edgar Britton are on display at the library. Exposition is an image of the National Cattle Congress, and Holiday is of a picnic.

=== In popular culture ===
The 2015 film Carol uses Waterloo in a major plot point.

In the 2022 film The Whale, the missionary Thomas, played by actor Ty Simpkins, says he was from Waterloo, Iowa.

In the 2022 film The Menu, the Chef played by actor Ralph Fiennes, says he was from Waterloo, Iowa.

=== Sports ===
Waterloo hosted a National Basketball Association (NBA) franchise for the 1949–50 season, being one of the smaller cities to have had a major league franchise in a Big Four American sport. The Waterloo Hawks (who hold no relation to the Atlanta Hawks) were a founding member of the NBA (under that name), but folded after one season.

Waterloo hosted the Waterloo Microbes and Waterloo Hawks teams of minor league baseball, with professional baseball play beginning in 1895.

Waterloo is home to the junior ice hockey team Waterloo Black Hawks of the United States Hockey League. They play out of Young Arena.

Waterloo is home to the summer collegiate baseball team Waterloo Bucks of the Northwoods League. The team was formed in 1995 and plays their home games at Riverfront Stadium (Waterloo). Until 1993, the stadium hosted a succession of professional minor league baseball teams.

Waterloo is also home to the Iowa Woo, an arena football team of The Arena League. They play at The Hippodrome.

== Government ==
Waterloo is administered by the mayor and council system of government. One council member is elected from each of Waterloo's five wards, and two are elected at-large. Serving since 2026, the current mayor is Dave Boesen, who unseated Quentin Hart in the 2025 city elections.

The city holds elections to elect its mayor and city council every two years, in odd-numbered off-year elections. The mayor is elected to a two-year term, city councilors to four-year terms.

Member	Seat	Entered office	Next election
Dave Boesen	Mayor	January 1, 2026	2027
Kelly Martin	At-large	January 1, 2026	2029
Steve Simon	At-large	January 1, 2024	2027
Steve Schmitt	Ward 1	January 1, 2026	2029
Dave Morrow	Ward 2	March 6, 2026	2031
Deb Berry	Ward 3	January 1, 2026	2029
Belinda Creighton-Smith	Ward 4	March 14, 2023	2027
Hector Salamanca Arroyo	Ward 5	January 1, 2026	2029

== Education ==
Hawkeye Community College is located in Waterloo. Neighboring Cedar Falls is home to the University of Northern Iowa.

Almost all of the city is within the Waterloo Community School District. The three public high schools in the city are Waterloo West High School, Waterloo East High School, and Expo High School. Additionally, a portion of the city is within the Cedar Falls Community School District.

Waterloo's private high schools are Waterloo Christian School and Columbus Catholic High School, which is supported by the Catholic parishes of Waterloo and Cedar Falls. Waterloo Christian is a non-denominational college preparatory school located on the grounds of Walnut Ridge Baptist Church. The school's colors are green and yellow, and its mascot is the "Regent". Columbus' mascot is the "Sailor", a connection to the school's namesake Christopher Columbus, and its colors are green and white.

There is also a wide array of elementary and junior high schools in the area, with open enrollment available.

== Media ==
=== Radio ===
FM stations

- 88.1 KBBG
- 88.9 KWVI
- 89.5 KHKE
- 90.9 KUNI (FM)
- 92.3 KOEL-FM
- 93.5 KCVM
- 94.5 KULT-LP
- 97.7 KCRR
- 98.5 KKHQ-FM
- 101.9 KNWS-FM
- 105.7 KOKZ
- 107.9 KFMW

AM stations

- 1090 KNWS
- 1250 KCFI
- 1330 KPTY
- 1540 KXEL
- 1650 KCNZ

=== Television ===
- 2 KGAN (CBS, Fox on DT2) – located in Cedar Rapids
- 7 KWWL (NBC, Heroes & Icons on DT2, MeTV on DT3) – located in Waterloo
- 9 KCRG-TV (ABC, MyNetworkTV on DT2, The CW on DT3) – located in Cedar Rapids
- 12 KIIN (PBS/Iowa PBS) – located in Iowa City
- 20 KWKB (TCT, This TV on DT5) – located in Iowa City
- 28 KFXA (Dabl) – located in Cedar Rapids
- 32 KRIN (PBS/Iowa PBS) – located in Waterloo
- 40 KFXB-TV (CTN) – located in Dubuque
- 48 KPXR-TV (Ion) – located in Cedar Rapids

=== Print ===
- The Courier, daily newspaper
- The Cedar Valley What Not, weekly advertiser

== Infrastructure ==
=== Transportation ===
Waterloo is located at the northern end of Interstate 380. U.S. Highways 20, 63, and 218 and Iowa Highway 21 also run through the metropolitan area. The Avenue of the Saints runs through Waterloo.

American Airlines provides non-stop air service to and from Chicago from the Waterloo Regional Airport as of April 3, 2012. As of October 27, 2014, American Airlines runs two flights to/from Chicago O'Hare (ORD). Departures to Chicago are early morning and mid/late afternoon. Arrivals are early/mid-afternoon and evening.

Waterloo is served by a metropolitan bus system (MET), which serves most areas of Cedar Falls and Waterloo. Most routes meet at the central bus station in downtown Waterloo. The system operates Monday through Saturday. During the week the earliest bus is at 5:45 am from downtown Waterloo, and the last bus arrives downtown at 6:40 pm. Service is limited on Saturdays.

Waterloo is served by one daily intercity bus arrival and departure to Chicago and Des Moines, provided by Burlington Trailways. New service to and from Mason City and Minneapolis/St. Paul provided by Jefferson Lines started in the fall of 2009, however was canceled in 2012.

There are currently four taxi operators in Waterloo and Cedar Falls: First Call, Yellow, City Cab, Cedar Valley Cab, and Dolly's Taxi.

The Chicago Central railroad runs through Waterloo.

=== Utilities ===
The MidAmerican Energy Company supplies Waterloo with electricity and natural gas. The Waterloo Water Works supplies potable water with a capacity of 50,400,000 GPD (gallons per day) with an average use of 13,400,000 GPD and a peak use of 28,800,000 GPD. News reports indicate that 18.5% of the system's output in 2013, or 851 million gallons, was unaccounted for. Sanitation service (sewage) is operated by the city of Waterloo, with a capacity of 36,500,000 GPD and an average use of 14,000,000 GPD.

=== Healthcare ===
Waterloo is home to two hospitals, Mercy One Waterloo Medical Center, which has 366 beds, and Unity Point Health Allen Memorial Hospital, with 234 beds. Neighboring Cedar Falls is home to Sartori Memorial Hospital, with 83 beds. The Waterloo-Cedar Falls metropolitan area has 295 physicians, 69 dentists, 52 chiropractors, 24 vision specialists and 21 nursing/retirement homes.

== Notable people ==
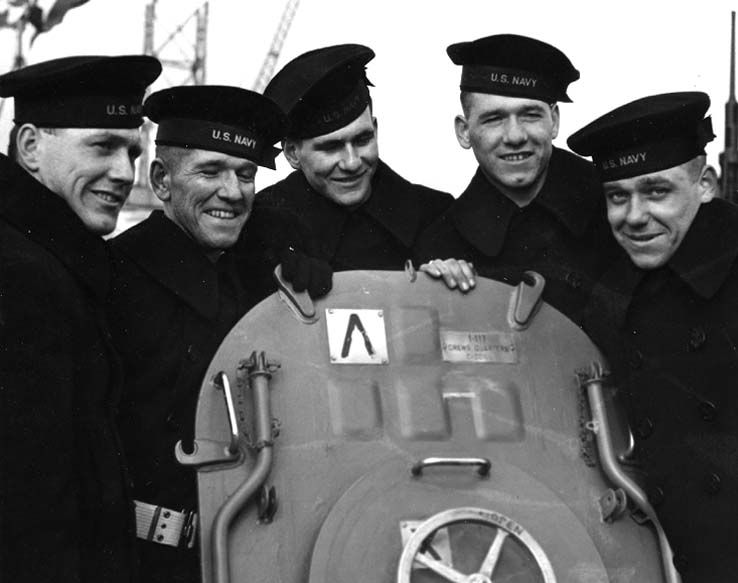
The Five Sullivan Brothers

- Julie Adams (1926–2019), actress
- Jerome Amos Jr. (born 1954), politician
- Michele Bachmann (born 1956), politician
- Hal C. Banks (1909–1985), corrupt Canadian labour leader
- David Barrett (born 1977), American football player
- William Birenbaum (1923–2010), educator
- Horace Boies (1827–1923), politician
- Bob Bowlsby (born 1952), athletics administrator
- Jack Bruner (1924–2003), baseball player
- Don Denkinger (1926–2003), baseball umpire
- Adam DeVine (born 1983), comedian, actor and writer
- Loren Doxey, physician and murderer
- Pearlretta DuPuy (1871–1939), zither player and clubwoman
- Rich Folkers (born 1946), baseball player and coach
- Travis Fulton (1977–2021), boxer and mixed martial artist
- Dan Gable (born 1948), wrestler and coach
- John Wayne Gacy (1942–1994), serial killer
- Kim Guadagno (born 1959), politician
- Mike Haffner (born 1942), American football player
- Nikole Hannah-Jones (born 1976), journalist
- Lou Henry Hoover (1874–1944), First Lady
- MarTay Jenkins (born 1975), American football player
- Anesa Kajtazović (born 1986), politician
- Arthur Rolland Kelly (1878–1959), architect
- Chris Klieman (born 1967), football coach,
- Bonnie Koloc (born 1946), singer-songwriter
- John Hooker Leavitt (1831–1906), politician
- Jason Lewis (born 1955), politician
- Jack Little (1899–1956), songwriter
- David Madson (1963–1997), architect, LGBTQ+ rights and HIV/AIDS activist
- Pat McLaughlin (born 1950), singer-songwriter
- J. J. Moses (born 1979), American football player
- Charles W. Mullan (1845–1919), politician
- Patrick A. Murphy (born 1958), Adjutant General of New York
- Larry Nemmers (born 1943), American football official
- Thunderbolt Patterson (born 1941), professional wrestler
- Joe Pelton (born 1977), poker player
- Don Perkins (1938–2022), American football player
- Cal Petersen (born 1994), ice hockey player
- Gordon Randolph (1915–1999), journalist
- Alfred C. Richmond (1902–1984), U.S. Coast Guard Admiral
- Mike Ritland, US Navy SEAL
- Gertrude Ina Robinson (1868–1950), harpist, composer and writer
- Reggie Roby (1961–2005), American football player
- Zud Schammel (1910–1973), American football player
- Sean Schemmel (born 1968), voice actor
- Duane Slick, (born 1961) painter and professor
- Tom Smith (born 1949), football player
- Vivian Smith (1891–1961), suffragist
- Paul Sohl (born 1963), U.S. Navy Rear Admiral
- Tracie Spencer (born 1976), singer-songwriter
- Darren Sproles (born 1983), American football player; running back for fifteen seasons
- Bradley Steffens (born 1955), writer
- Suzanne Stephens (born 1946), clarinetist and basset horn player
- Sullivan Brothers, U.S. Navy sailors and brothers
- Corey Taylor (born 1973), musician
- Michael Townley (born 1942), agent
- Mike van Arsdale (born 1965), mixed martial artist
- Mona Van Duyn (1921–2004), poet
- Emily West (born 1981), singer
- Nancy Youngblut (born 1953), actress
- Bruce B. Zager (born 1952), judge

== Twin towns and sister cities ==
Waterloo is twinned with:

- Giessen, Germany (1981)
- Targovishte, Bulgaria (2002)
- Harbel, Liberia (2019)

== See also ==
- Impact of the COVID-19 pandemic on the meat industry in the United States
