= Eden Township, Fayette County, Iowa =

Eden Township
- Township
- Location in Fayette County
- Coordinates: 43°02′27″N 92°01′14″W
- Country: United States
- State: Iowa
- County: Fayette

Area
  - Total: 36.44 sq mi (94.37 km^{2})
  - Land: 36.44 sq mi (94.37 km^{2})
  - Water: 0 sq mi (0 km^{2}) 0%
- Elevation: 1,020 ft (311 m)

Population (2010)
  - Total: 623
  - Density: 17.1/sq mi (6.60/km^{2})
- Time zone: UTC-6 (CST)
  - Summer (DST): UTC-5 (CDT)
- ZIP codes: 52147, 52171
- GNIS feature ID: 0467764

Eden Township is one of twenty townships in Fayette County, Iowa. As of the 2010 census, its population was 623.

== Geography ==
According to the United States Census Bureau, Eden Township covers an area of 36.44 square miles (94.37 square kilometers).

=== Cities, towns, villages ===
- Waucoma

=== Unincorporated towns ===
- Alpha at 42.996643°N 92.047672°W

(This list is based on USGS data and may include former settlements.)

=== Adjacent townships ===
- Jackson Township, Winneshiek County (north)
- Washington Township, Winneshiek County (northeast)
- Auburn Township (east)
- Windsor Township (southeast)
- Bethel Township (south)
- Stapleton Township, Chickasaw County (west)
- Utica Township, Chickasaw County (northwest)

=== Cemeteries ===
The township contains these five cemeteries: Alpha, Oak Lawn, Saint Marys, Saint Rose and Waucoma.

=== Major highways ===
- Iowa Highway 193

== School districts ==
- North Fayette Valley Community School District
- Turkey Valley Community School District

== Political districts ==
- Iowa's 1st congressional district
- State House District 18
- State Senate District 9
