= Eden, Iowa =

- former unincorporated community
- Location of Eden within the state of Iowa
- Coordinates: 43°01′25″N 91°58′50″W
- Country: United States
- State: Iowa
- County: Fayette County
- Elevation: 932 ft (284 m)
- Time zone: UTC-6 (Central (CST))
  - Summer (DST): UTC-5 (CDT)

Eden is a former unincorporated community in Fayette County, Iowa, United States.

== Geography ==
Eden was located at the junction of Sunset Road and Spruce Road, four miles northeast of Fayette, near the crossing of the Little Turkey River.

== History ==
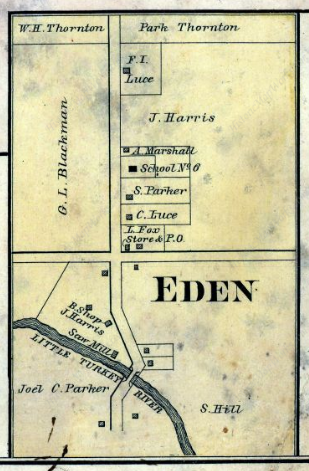
Eden, in Fayette County, Iowa, in 1879

Eden was in the eastern part of Eden Township. Eden's population was 26 in 1925. Eden was marked on county maps as late as the 1930s, but rural migration emptied the community.

A 1911 history of Fayette County states that Eden was "a little hamlet located on section 24" of Eden Township.

In 1856, settler Oliver Stone built a saw-mill on the Little Turkey River, which passed through Eden, "and around this centered quite a number of early pioneer homes. Being located in a rich farming district, the small amount of business which the village stimulated was of that substantial kind which encourages the merchant and enables him to continue. During the days when the Patrons of Husbandry wielded a strong influence in this county, a Grange store was established at Eden, and conducted successfully for a number of years by George L. Noble, manager. But that feature was abandoned many years ago, and there is now one small store there, owned and operated by R. F. Rogers, an early settler and prominent citizen in the township."

In 1942, the Eden school house was sold to Mrs. Martin Tessmer, who planned to have it moved to her farm north of Waucoma. The benches, desk, stove, and outbuildings were sold to various other individuals.

== See also ==
- Lima, Iowa
