= Center Township, Fayette County, Iowa =

Center Township
- Township
- Location in Fayette County
- Coordinates: 42°51′59″N 91°54′28″W
- Country: United States
- State: Iowa
- County: Fayette

Area
  - Total: 36.73 sq mi (95.13 km^{2})
  - Land: 36.69 sq mi (95.03 km^{2})
  - Water: 0.042 sq mi (0.11 km^{2}) 0.12%
- Elevation: 1,122 ft (342 m)

Population (2010)
  - Total: 313
  - Density: 8.53/sq mi (3.29/km^{2})
- Time zone: UTC-6 (CST)
  - Summer (DST): UTC-5 (CDT)
- ZIP codes: 50655, 50674, 52142, 52147, 52164
- GNIS feature ID: 0467576

Center Township is one of twenty townships in Fayette County, Iowa, United States. As of the 2010 census, its population was 313.

== Geography ==
According to the United States Census Bureau, Center Township covers an area of 36.73 square miles (95.13 square kilometers); of this, 36.69 square miles (95.03 square kilometers, 99.89 percent) is land and 0.04 square miles (0.11 square kilometers, 0.12 percent) is water.

=== Cities, towns, villages ===
The town of Randalia is located in Center township. It is the only incorporated community. The disincorporated community of Donnan was located at 42.896091°N 91.877944°W.

=== Adjacent townships ===
- Windsor Township (north)
- Union Township (northeast)
- Westfield Township (east)
- Smithfield Township (southeast)
- Harlan Township (south)
- Fremont Township (southwest)
- Banks Township (west)
- Bethel Township (northwest)

=== Cemeteries ===
The township contains these three cemeteries: Center Grove, Dunham's Grove and Fayette County Farm.

=== Major highways ===
- Iowa Highway 93

=== Airports and landing strips ===
- Hawk Landing Strip

=== Landmarks ===
- Twin Bridges County Park (west three-quarters)

== School districts ==
- North Fayette Valley Community School District
- West Central Community School District

== Political districts ==
- Iowa's 1st congressional district
- State House District 18
- State Senate District 9
