= Bohemian Savings Bank =

- U.S. National Register of Historic Places
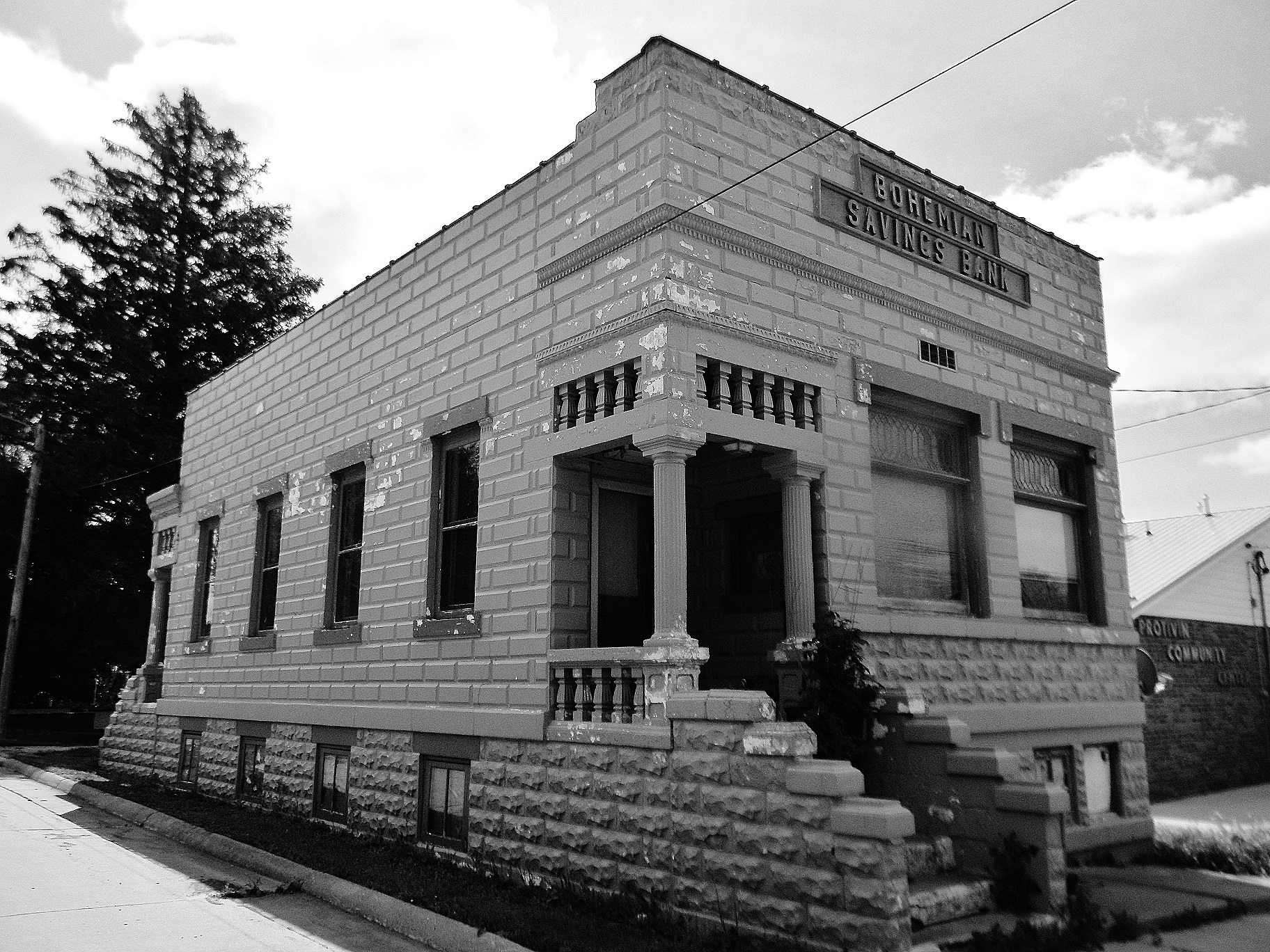

- Location within Iowa Location within the United States
- Location: Main St. Protivin, Iowa
- Coordinates: 43°13′04″N 92°05′27″W
- Area: less than one acre
- Built: 1910
- Built by: John Neuzil
- Architect: Rudolph Lakomy; Fisher-Stevens Co.
- Architectural style: Classical Revival
- NRHP reference No.: 88002806
- Added to NRHP: September 13, 1990

The Bohemian Savings Bank, also known as the Decorah State Bank, Protivin Branch, is a historic building located in Protivin, Iowa, United States. The town of Protivin was established in 1877, and did not have a bank until 1910. Bohemian Savings Bank was established to prevent people from near by Decorah, Iowa from establishing one here. The Rev. Rudolph Lakomy, the local parish priest, was one of the bank's organizers and served on its first Board of Directors. He also designed the exterior of the building. The Neoclassical structure was built of smooth concrete blocks that simulate stone. It rests on a concrete foundation. The balustraded porches located on the front and back sides of the building are flanked with columns of the Doric order. The building was built by the John Neuzil construction firm from Fort Atkinson, Iowa. The Fisher-Stevens Co. from Charles City, Iowa designed the interior of the building. Bohemian Savings Bank became a branch of the Decorah State Bank on December 1, 1986. A new bank building was built next door to replace this one in the late 1980s. This building was listed on the National Register of Historic Places in 1990.
