= Fort Atkinson, Iowa =

- City
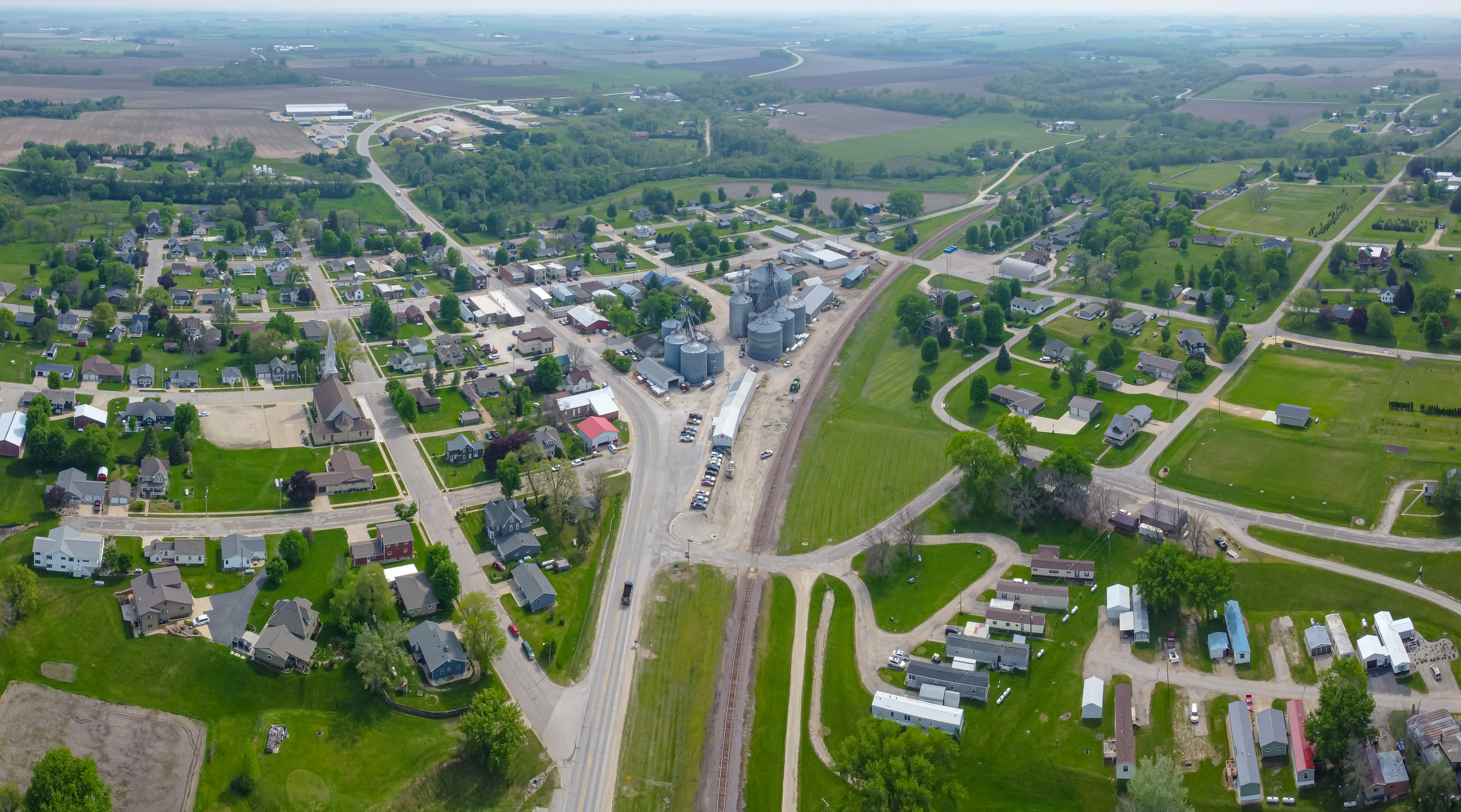
- Iowa-24 runs through town

- Location of Fort Atkinson, Iowa
- Coordinates: 43°8′39″N 91°56′5″W
- Country: United States
- State: Iowa
- County: Winneshiek
- Incorporated: June 5, 1895

Area
  - Total: 0.32 sq mi (0.82 km^{2})
  - Land: 0.32 sq mi (0.82 km^{2})
  - Water: 0 sq mi (0.00 km^{2})
- Elevation: 1,047 ft (319 m)

Population (2020)
  - Total: 312
  - Density: 982.4/sq mi (379.31/km^{2})
- Time zone: UTC-6 (Central (CST))
  - Summer (DST): UTC-5 (CDT)
- ZIP code: 52144
- Area code: 563
- FIPS code: 19-28425
- GNIS feature ID: 0456681
- Website: www.fortatkinsoniowa.com

Fort Atkinson is a city in Winneshiek County, Iowa, United States. The population was 312 at the time of the 2020 census. It is home to the historic Fort Atkinson State Preserve and hosts a large annual fur-trapper rendezvous each September. Fort Atkinson holds the largest regional hay auction every Wednesday.

== History ==
Fort Atkinson was built to protect the Ho-Chunk (Winnebago) during their removal from Wisconsin. The name honors Henry Atkinson, the commanding officer in charge of the effort. Construction began in May 1840 and was complete by the summer of 1842. The regular army turned the fort over to Iowa volunteers as the troops stationed there were needed for the Mexican–American War. After the Ho-Chunk were removed from Iowa the post was abandoned on February 14, 1849.

== Geography ==
Fort Atkinson is located at 43°8′39″N 91°56′5″W (43.144034, −91.934839).

According to the United States Census Bureau, the city has a total area of 0.31 square miles (0.80 km^{2}), all land.

== Demographics ==
Historical populations
Year	Pop.	±%
1880	435	—
1890	480	+10.3%
1900	264	−45.0%
1910	289	+9.5%
1920	315	+9.0%
1930	305	−3.2%
1940	261	−14.4%
1950	273	+4.6%
1960	353	+29.3%
1970	339	−4.0%
1980	374	+10.3%
1990	367	−1.9%
2000	389	+6.0%
2010	349	−10.3%
2020	312	−10.6%
Source:"U.S. Census website". United States Census Bureau. and Iowa Data Center; Source: U.S. Decennial Census

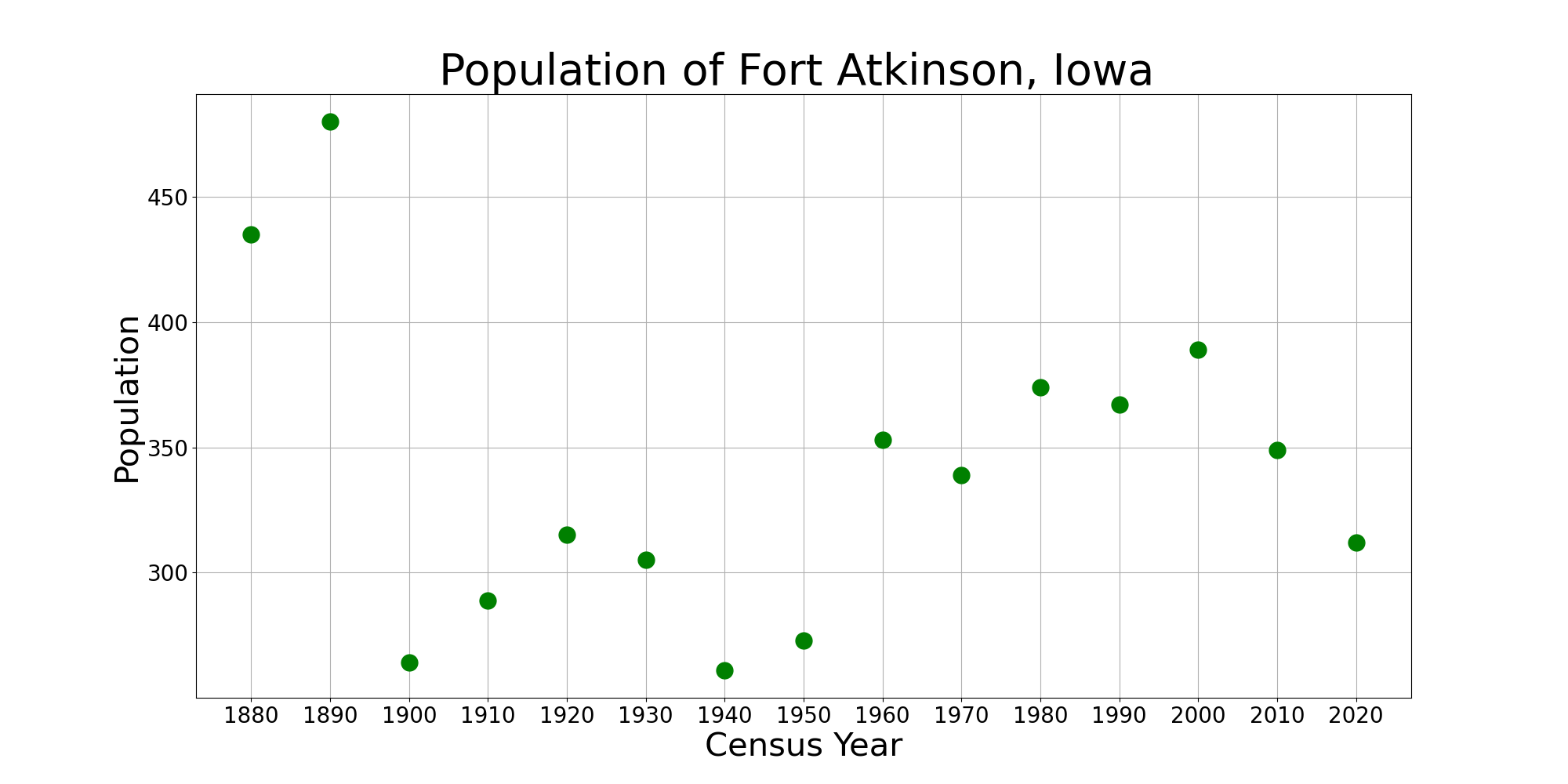
The population of Fort Atkinson, Iowa from US census data

=== 2020 census ===
As of the census of 2020, there were 312 people, 154 households, and 95 families residing in the city. The population density was 982.4 inhabitants per square mile (379.3/km^{2}). There were 171 housing units at an average density of 538.4 per square mile (207.9/km^{2}). The racial makeup of the city was 96.5% White, 0.0% Black or African American, 0.0% Native American, 0.0% Asian, 0.0% Pacific Islander, 0.6% from other races and 2.9% from two or more races. Hispanic or Latino persons of any race comprised 2.6% of the population.

Of the 154 households, 23.4% of which had children under the age of 18 living with them, 48.1% were married couples living together, 6.5% were cohabitating couples, 18.8% had a female householder with no spouse or partner present and 26.6% had a male householder with no spouse or partner present. 38.3% of all households were non-families. 35.1% of all households were made up of individuals, 17.5% had someone living alone who was 65 years old or older.

The median age in the city was 48.0 years. 19.2% of the residents were under the age of 20; 4.5% were between the ages of 20 and 24; 22.8% were from 25 and 44; 27.9% were from 45 and 64; and 25.6% were 65 years of age or older. The gender makeup of the city was 52.9% male and 47.1% female.

=== 2010 census ===
As of the census of 2010, there were 349 people, 160 households, and 102 families residing in the city. The population density was 1,125.8 inhabitants per square mile (434.7/km^{2}). There were 170 housing units at an average density of 548.4 per square mile (211.7/km^{2}). The racial makeup of the city was 98.0% White, 1.7% from other races, and 0.3% from two or more races. Hispanic or Latino of any race were 3.2% of the population.

There were 160 households, of which 22.5% had children under the age of 18 living with them, 46.9% were married couples living together, 11.9% had a female householder with no husband present, 5.0% had a male householder with no wife present, and 36.3% were non-families. 34.4% of all households were made up of individuals, and 20% had someone living alone who was 65 years of age or older. The average household size was 2.18 and the average family size was 2.78.

The median age in the city was 47.3 years. 20.3% of residents were under the age of 18; 8.7% were between the ages of 18 and 24; 18.4% were from 25 to 44; 27.5% were from 45 to 64; and 25.2% were 65 years of age or older. The gender makeup of the city was 49.6% male and 50.4% female.

=== 2000 census ===
As of the census of 2000, there were 389 people, 165 households, and 102 families residing in the city. The population density was 1,240.9 inhabitants per square mile (479.1/km^{2}). There were 169 housing units at an average density of 539.1 per square mile (208.1/km^{2}). The racial makeup of the city was 99.49% White, 0.26% Native American and 0.26% Asian. Hispanic or Latino of any race were 0.26% of the population.

There were 165 households, out of which 26.1% had children under the age of 18 living with them, 53.3% were married couples living together, 7.9% had a female householder with no husband present, and 37.6% were non-families. 33.9% of all households were made up of individuals, and 18.8% had someone living alone who was 65 years of age or older. The average household size was 2.36 and the average family size was 3.05.

In the city, the population was spread out, with 26.0% under the age of 18, 8.2% from 18 to 24, 23.7% from 25 to 44, 21.6% from 45 to 64, and 20.6% who were 65 years of age or older. The median age was 40 years. For every 100 females, there were 95.5 males. For every 100 females age 18 and over, there were 101.4 males.

The median income for a household in the city was $34,205, and the median income for a family was $38,333. Males had a median income of $27,292 versus $17,813 for females. The per capita income for the city was $14,702. About 12.3% of families and 12.7% of the population were below the poverty line, including 9.6% of those under age 18 and 12.7% of those age 65 or over.

== Schools ==
Fort Atkinson is located in the Turkey Valley Community School District, a small K-12 school with about 575 students. The district's schools serve students from the small communities of Lawler, Waucoma, St. Lucas, Protivin, Fort Atkinson, and Jackson Junction. The schools themselves are located in Jackson Junction.

There is also a private Catholic school in Protivin called Trinity Catholic School.

== Notable people ==
- Judson Dean Howard (c. 1878 – 1961), speleologist known for helping establish Lava Beds National Monument in California
