= Bethel Township, Fayette County, Iowa =

Bethel Township
- Township
- Location in Fayette County
- Coordinates: 42°57′10″N 92°01′05″W
- Country: United States
- State: Iowa
- County: Fayette

Area
  - Total: 36.12 sq mi (93.54 km^{2})
  - Land: 36.09 sq mi (93.46 km^{2})
  - Water: 0.031 sq mi (0.08 km^{2}) 0.09%
- Elevation: 1,120 ft (340 m)

Population (2010)
  - Total: 297
  - Density: 8.23/sq mi (3.18/km^{2})
- Time zone: UTC-6 (CST)
  - Summer (DST): UTC-5 (CDT)
- ZIP codes: 50674, 52147, 52171
- GNIS feature ID: 0467450

Bethel Township is one of twenty townships in Fayette County, Iowa, United States. As of the 2000 census, its population was 297.

== Geography ==
According to the United States Census Bureau, Bethel Township covers an area of 36.12 square miles (93.54 square kilometers); of this, 36.09 square miles (93.46 square kilometers, 99.91 percent) is land and 0.03 square miles (0.08 square kilometers, 0.09 percent) is water.

=== Unincorporated towns ===
- Richfield at 42.950255°N 92.062672°W

(This list is based on USGS data and may include former settlements.)

=== Adjacent townships ===
- Eden Township (north)
- Auburn Township (northeast)
- Windsor Township (east)
- Center Township (southeast)
- Banks Township (south)
- Sumner No. 2 Township, Bremer County (southwest)
- Fredericksburg Township, Chickasaw County (west)
- Stapleton Township, Chickasaw County (northwest)

=== Cemeteries ===
The township contains these three cemeteries: Bethel, Pitts and Richfield.

=== Major highways ===
- U.S. Route 18
- Iowa Highway 193

== School districts ==
- North Fayette Valley Community School District
- Sumner-Fredericksburg Community School District

== Political districts ==
- Iowa's 1st congressional district
- State House District 18
- State Senate District 9
