= Auburn Township, Fayette County, Iowa =

Auburn Township
- Township
- Location in Fayette County
- Coordinates: 43°02′34″N 91°53′46″W
- Country: United States
- State: Iowa
- County: Fayette

Area
  - Total: 36.73 sq mi (95.12 km^{2})
  - Land: 36.73 sq mi (95.12 km^{2})
  - Water: 0 sq mi (0 km^{2}) 0%
- Elevation: 1,152 ft (351 m)

Population (2010)
  - Total: 527
  - Density: 14.3/sq mi (5.54/km^{2})
- Time zone: UTC-6 (CST)
  - Summer (DST): UTC-5 (CDT)
- ZIP codes: 52144, 52147, 52166, 52171, 52175
- GNIS feature ID: 0467402

Auburn Township is one of twenty townships in Fayette County, Iowa, United States. As of the 2010 census, its population was 527.

== Geography ==
According to the United States Census Bureau, Auburn Township covers an area of 36.7 square miles (95.1 km^{2}), all of it land.

== Communities ==
=== Cities ===
- St. Lucas

=== Unincorporated communities ===
- Auburn
- Douglass at 43.008311°N 91.871275°W
- Massillon
- West Auburn

=== Adjacent townships ===
- Washington Township, Winneshiek County (north)
- Dover Township (east)
- Union Township (southeast)
- Windsor Township (south)
- Bethel Township (southwest)
- Eden Township (west)
- Jackson Township, Winneshiek County (northwest)

== Cemeteries ==
The township contains these three cemeteries: Eden, Oak Ridge and Saint Lukes Catholic.

== Major highways ==
- Iowa Highway 150

== School districts ==
- North Fayette Valley Community School District
- Turkey Valley Community School District

== Political districts ==
- Iowa's 1st congressional district
- State House District 18
- State Senate District 9
