= Jackson Junction, Iowa =

- City
- Location of Jackson Junction, Iowa
- Coordinates: 43°6′25″N 92°2′48″W
- Country: United States
- State: Iowa
- County: Winneshiek

Area
  - Total: 5.96 sq mi (15.43 km^{2})
  - Land: 5.96 sq mi (15.43 km^{2})
  - Water: 0 sq mi (0.00 km^{2})
- Elevation: 1,158 ft (353 m)

Population (2020)
  - Total: 37
  - Density: 6.2/sq mi (2.4/km^{2})
- Time zone: UTC-6 (Central (CST))
  - Summer (DST): UTC-5 (CDT)
- ZIP code: 52171
- FIPS code: 19-39135
- GNIS feature ID: 0457893

Jackson Junction is a city in Winneshiek County, Iowa, United States. The population was 37 at the time of the 2020 census.

== Geography ==
Jackson Junction is located at 43°6′25″N 92°2′48″W (43.106913, -92.046724).

According to the United States Census Bureau, the city has a total area of 5.99 square miles (15.51 km^{2}), all land.

== Demographics ==
Historical populations
Year	Pop.	±%
1900	171	—
1910	160	−6.4%
1920	130	−18.8%
1930	126	−3.1%
1940	122	−3.2%
1950	107	−12.3%
1960	89	−16.8%
1970	106	+19.1%
1980	94	−11.3%
1990	87	−7.4%
2000	60	−31.0%
2010	58	−3.3%
2020	37	−36.2%
Source:"U.S. Census website". United States Census Bureau. and Iowa Data Center; Source: U.S. Decennial Census

=== 2020 census ===
As of the census of 2020, there were 37 people, 8 households, and 5 families residing in the city. The population density was 6.2 inhabitants per square mile (2.4/km^{2}). There were 20 housing units at an average density of 3.4 per square mile (1.3/km^{2}). The racial makeup of the city was 94.6% White, 0.0% Black or African American, 0.0% Native American, 0.0% Asian, 0.0% Pacific Islander, 0.0% from other races and 5.4% from two or more races. Hispanic or Latino persons of any race comprised 0.0% of the population.

Of the 8 households, 25.0% of which had children under the age of 18 living with them, 62.5% were married couples living together, 0.0% were cohabitating couples, 25.0% had a female householder with no spouse or partner present and 12.5% had a male householder with no spouse or partner present. 37.5% of all households were non-families. 37.5% of all households were made up of individuals, 12.5% had someone living alone who was 65 years old or older.

The median age in the city was 46.5 years. 35.1% of the residents were under the age of 20; 5.4% were between the ages of 20 and 24; 2.7% were from 25 and 44; 32.4% were from 45 and 64; and 24.3% were 65 years of age or older. The gender makeup of the city was 51.4% male and 48.6% female.

=== 2010 census ===
As of the census of 2010, there were 58 people, 21 households, and 18 families living in the city. The population density was 9.7 inhabitants per square mile (3.7/km^{2}). There were 23 housing units at an average density of 3.8 per square mile (1.5/km^{2}). The racial makeup of the city was 98.3% White and 1.7% Asian.

There were 21 households, of which 38.1% had children under the age of 18 living with them, 66.7% were married couples living together, 14.3% had a female householder with no husband present, 4.8% had a male householder with no wife present, and 14.3% were non-families. 14.3% of all households were made up of individuals, and 9.6% had someone living alone who was 65 years of age or older. The average household size was 2.76 and the average family size was 3.00.

The median age in the city was 37.5 years. 25.9% of residents were under the age of 18; 5.1% were between the ages of 18 and 24; 27.6% were from 25 to 44; 27.5% were from 45 to 64; and 13.8% were 65 years of age or older. The gender makeup of the city was 56.9% male and 43.1% female.

=== 2000 census ===
As of the census of 2000, there were 60 people, 24 households, and 15 families living in the city. The population density was 10.0 inhabitants per square mile (3.9/km^{2}). There were 24 housing units at an average density of 4.0 per square mile (1.5/km^{2}). The racial makeup of the city was 98.33% White and 1.67% Asian.

There were 24 households, out of which 29.2% had children under the age of 18 living with them, 58.3% were married couples living together, 4.2% had a female householder with no husband present, and 37.5% were non-families. 37.5% of all households were made up of individuals, and 8.3% had someone living alone who was 65 years of age or older. The average household size was 2.50 and the average family size was 3.40.

In the city, the population was spread out, with 30.0% under the age of 18, 3.3% from 18 to 24, 33.3% from 25 to 44, 25.0% from 45 to 64, and 8.3% who were 65 years of age or older. The median age was 38 years. For every 100 females, there were 122.2 males. For every 100 females age 18 and over, there were 133.3 males.

The median income for a household in the city was $31,875, and the median income for a family was $41,563. Males had a median income of $31,042 versus $13,750 for females. The per capita income for the city was $15,825. There were no families and 4.4% of the population living below the poverty line, including no under eighteens and none of those over 64.

== Education ==
The municipality is within the Turkey Valley Community School District. The district, which also serves the nearby communities of Waucoma; Lawler; Fort Atkinson; St. Lucas and Protivin as well as its rural areas, maintains its school in Jackson Junction.

== See also ==
- Lawrence Bridge (Jackson Junction, Iowa)
