= Windsor Township, Fayette County, Iowa =

Windsor Township
- Township
- Location in Fayette County
- Coordinates: 42°56′56″N 91°54′14″W
- Country: United States
- State: Iowa
- County: Fayette

Area
  - Total: 36.26 sq mi (93.92 km^{2})
  - Land: 36.26 sq mi (93.92 km^{2})
  - Water: 0 sq mi (0 km^{2}) 0%
- Elevation: 1,191 ft (363 m)

Population (2010)
  - Total: 776
  - Density: 21.4/sq mi (8.26/km^{2})
- Time zone: UTC-6 (CST)
  - Summer (DST): UTC-5 (CDT)
- ZIP codes: 52142, 52147, 52175
- GNIS feature ID: 0469009

Windsor Township is one of twenty townships in Fayette County, Iowa, United States. As of the 2010 census, its population was 776.

== Geography ==
According to the United States Census Bureau, Windsor Township covers an area of 36.26 square miles (93.92 square kilometers).

=== Cities, towns, villages ===
- Hawkeye

=== Adjacent townships ===
- Auburn Township (north)
- Dover Township (northeast)
- Union Township (east)
- Westfield Township (southeast)
- Center Township (south)
- Banks Township (southwest)
- Bethel Township (west)
- Eden Township (northwest)

=== Cemeteries ===
The township contains five cemeteries: Boale, Hawkeye, South Windsor and Windsor, Righale.

=== Major highways ===
- U.S. Route 18

=== Landmarks ===
- Hauth Park

== School districts ==
- North Fayette Valley Community School District

== Political districts ==
- Iowa's 1st congressional district
- State House District 18
- State Senate District 9
