= Donnan, Iowa =

- Ghost town
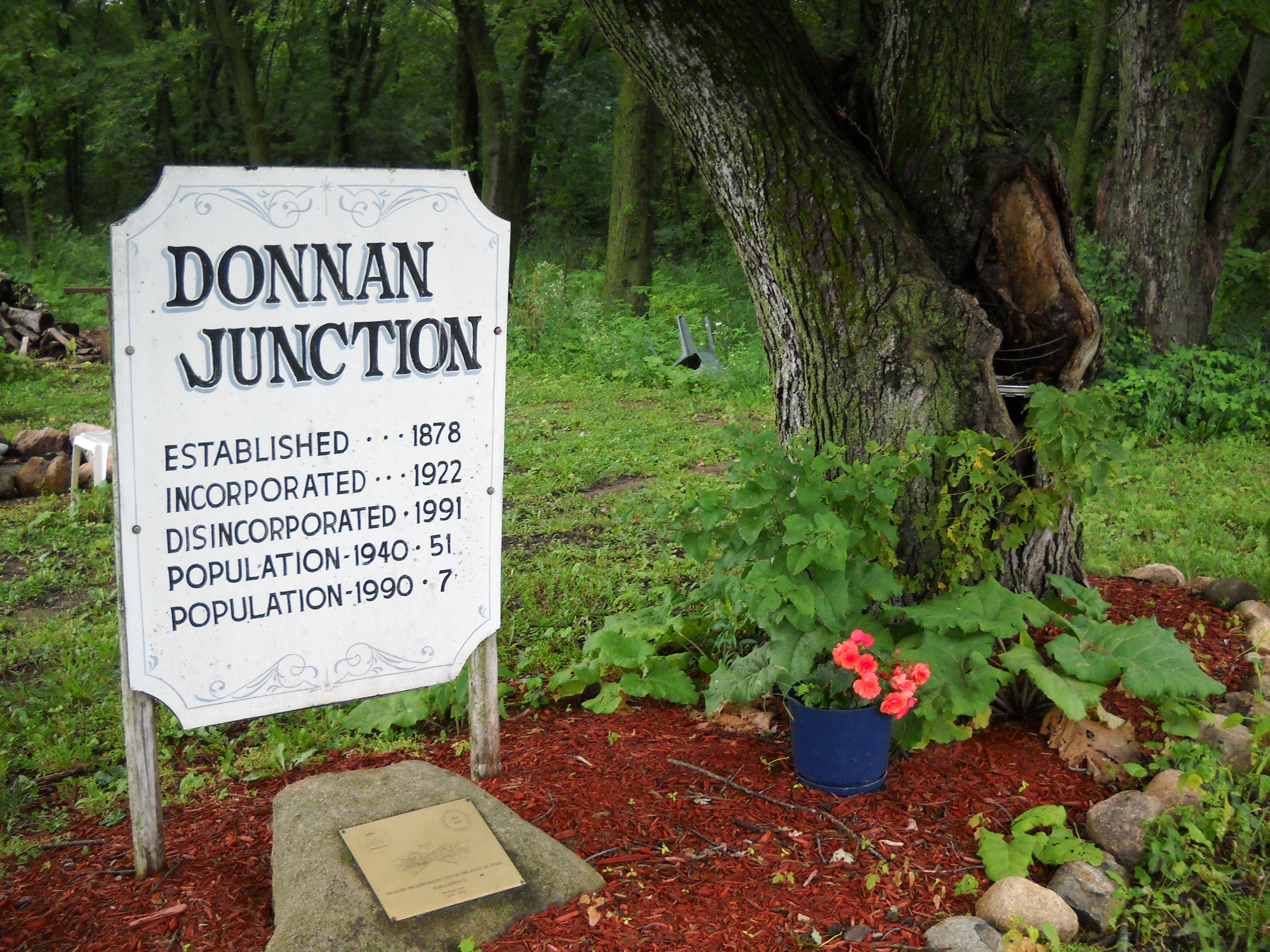
- Site of Donnan

- Location within the state of Iowa
- Coordinates: 42°53′46″N 91°52′41″W
- Country: United States
- State: Iowa
- County: Fayette
- Platted: 1878
- Incorporated: 1922
- Disincorporated: 1991

Area
  - Total: 1.00 sq mi (2.59 km^{2})

Population (1990)
  - Total: 7
  - Density: 7.0/sq mi (2.7/km^{2})
- Time zone: UTC-6 (Central (CST))
  - Summer (DST): UTC-5 (CDT)
- ZIP codes: 52139
- Area code: 319

Donnan is a former city in the U.S. state of Iowa, located in central Fayette County. For many years, this farm hamlet was Iowa's smallest incorporated city. The town's population slowly eroded over the years; by 1990 the population had dropped to 7, and the remaining residents voted to disincorporate. Donnan ceased to exist as a city in early 1991.

== History ==
=== Early years ===
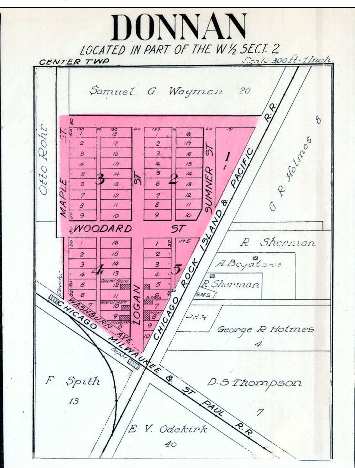
Plat map of Donnan from 1916.

The post office at Donnan was established on July 10, 1874; The town was platted in 1878 as Donnan Junction, located at the junction of the Chicago, Milwaukee, St. Paul and Pacific and Chicago, Rock Island and Pacific railroads.

Donnan was named in honor of William G. Donnan (1834–1908), who served the area in the House of Representatives from 1871 to 1875. It was believed that the community would thrive, due to its location at the junction of two major rail lines.

The town plat showed Donnan divided into five blocks, with blocks 2 and 3 divided into 18 parcels each. Blocks 1, 4, and 5 were smaller because of the railroad lines running diagonally through the community. Donnan had three streets running north–south; from westernmost to easternmost the streets were named Maple, Logan, and Sumner. The east–west streets were named Woodard Street and Washburn Avenue. By 1916, only six houses had been built, and these were all on Logan Street. Several farmhouses also fronted the Rock Island railroad tracks (see map).

=== Incorporation ===
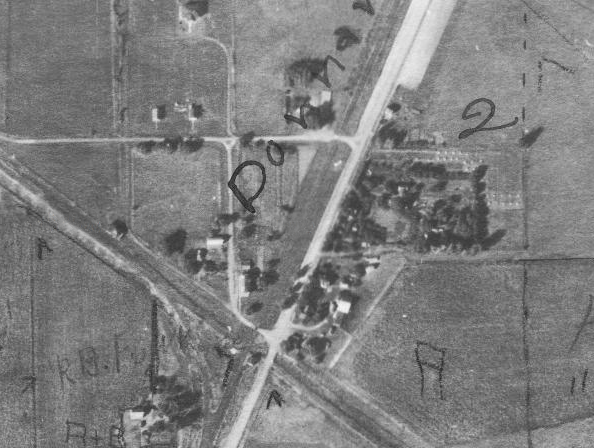
A Donnan aerial photo taken in the 1930s, showing Donnan's new main street, New Donnan Road (running diagonally from southwest to northeast). Woodard Street and Logan Street can also be clearly seen in the photo.

The settlement was officially incorporated (as Donnan) in 1922 so that a school could be built. An area of 1-square-mile (2.6 km^{2}) of land was included within the city limits so the area would meet the state's 25-person minimum population requirements. By the 1930s, several improvements had been made in the town, including a diagonal road built alongside the Rock Island railroad. This road, named New Donnan Road, became the town's main thoroughfare.

The population in 1930 was 37. This made Donnan Iowa's smallest incorporated community, according to the Postville Herald.

Aside from the post office and railroad depot, the community also had a meeting hall, a pool hall, stock yards, a restaurant, an implement company, a hardware store, a grain elevator, a livery stable, a blacksmith shop, and a three-story hotel. Despite attracting a number of businesses and the site's prime location at the junction of two railways, the town never attracted many residents. The population of Donnan peaked at around fifty people in the 1940s.

The City of Donnan was still the state's smallest recognized community in 1954; the post office served 12 families (50 residents) and the school. Officials at the U.S. Postal Service that year decided to close the Donnan post office, but due to protests from residents, in February 1955 the closure was cancelled. Donnan did, however, lose its school in 1957; The hotel at Donnan had been moved to Sumner in 1947 and the building was converted into apartments.

Lynn J. Webb served as Donnan's postmaster up until his death in 1955; Webb also ran the filling station and general store run out of the same building. Gertrude Menuey served as postmaster from 1955 to the 1970s. Eileen Lee was the postmaster during the 1980s.

A. L. Begalske served as mayor of Donnan until his death in 1955. Matthew Porter was appointed mayor after Begalske's death, and served for the next 35 years. Ruth Holmes was the town clerk, Margaret Gage the treasurer.

=== Decline ===
Historical population
Census	Pop.	Note	%±
1930	37		—
1940	51		37.8%
1950	36		−29.4%
1960	32		−11.1%
1970	18		−43.7%
1980	10		−44.4%
1990	7		−30.0%
U.S. Decennial Census

Gradually, the small population of Donnan eroded, leaving the town with fewer than 25 residents in 1970, and just 18 in 1972. All businesses except the post office had closed by the early 1970s. County road W-25, a paved highway from nearby Randalia to the county seat at West Union bypassed Donnan's main street, New Donnan Road, in the early 1970s.

By 1977, Donnan consisted of "an abandoned grain elevator, an unused railroad depot, three farms, four occupied houses, and a few empty buildings". The Rock Island Railroad tracks at Donnan were pulled up in 1977. By 1978, the town's population had dropped to 13. That year Donnan residents celebrated the city's 100th anniversary. In 1979, Donnan made state headlines when the community elected three women to the Donnan city council, which the Waterloo Courier stated was a "first ever" occurrence in the state.

Donnan's few remaining residents fought "long, hard, and unsuccessfully" to keep the post office open. By 1982, however, postal officials prevailed. When the post office closed, on July 23, 1982, commemorative covers prepared by the Iowa Postal History Society gave the town's population as ten. Residents resisted the closing of the last business in Donnan "because [Donnan] citizens love it and hate to see it die", Mayor Porter said in 1988.

In 1990, the last seven residents made national headlines when they reluctantly voted to disincorporate, ending their town's status as an officially recognized city. At the disincorporation hearing Matt Porter, who had served as the town's mayor for 35 years, stated "Three of us are in our 70s and sooner or later it's got to come. There's no one else to carry on". Donnan ceased to exist in March 1991; the final vote was 6 to 1 in favor of disincorporation.

A monument on New Donnan Road pays tribute to the empty community, which lies just two miles (3 km) north of its nearly empty sister community of Randalia (population 68). In October 2007, like Donnan before it, Randalia lost its post office, some time after losing its school and general store. Matthew Porter died in a fire in his home in Donnan in 2009. The Fayette County Museum in West Union maintains a Donnan room dedicated to the history of the lost community.

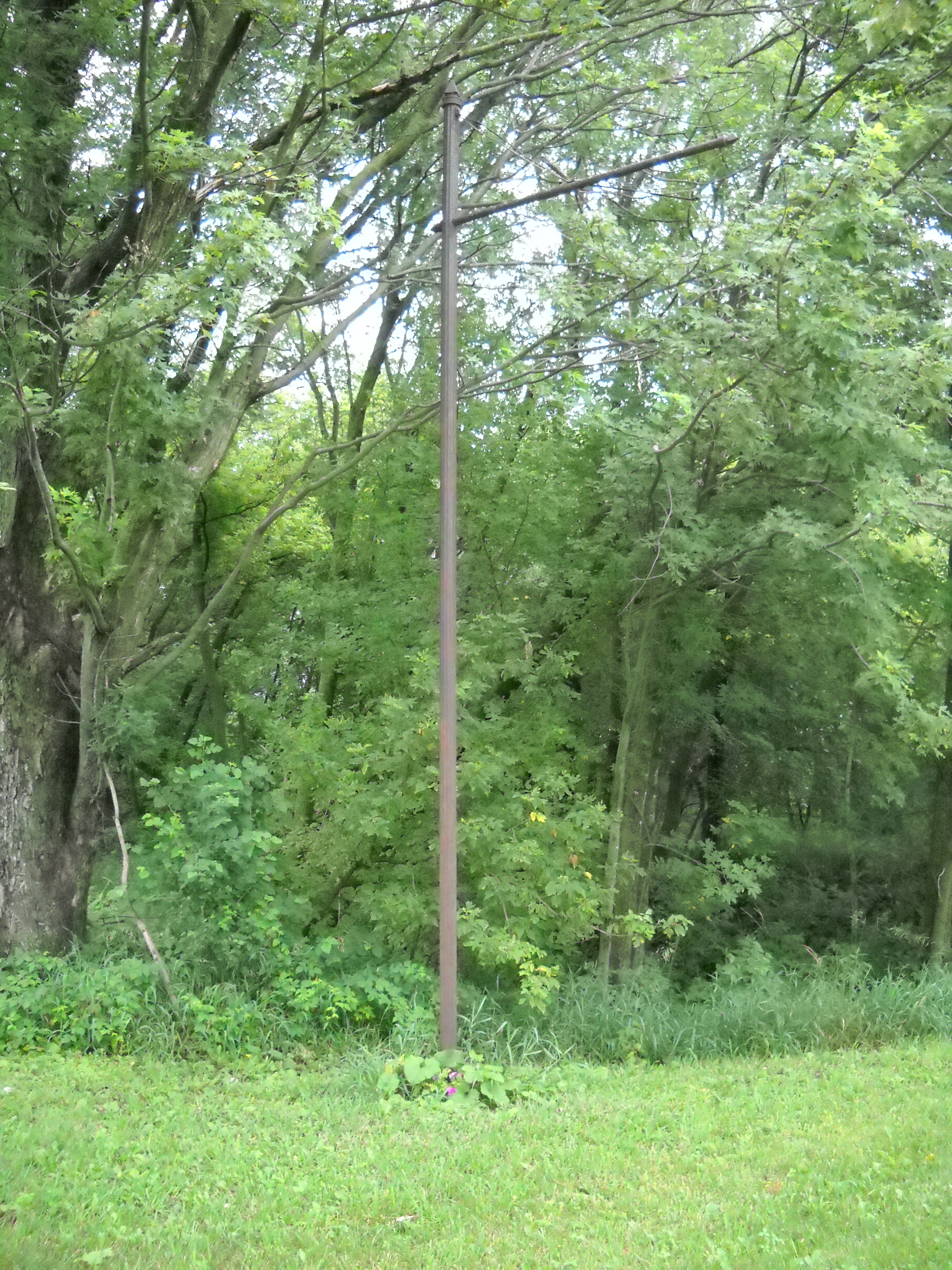
Former railroad station sign in Donnan.

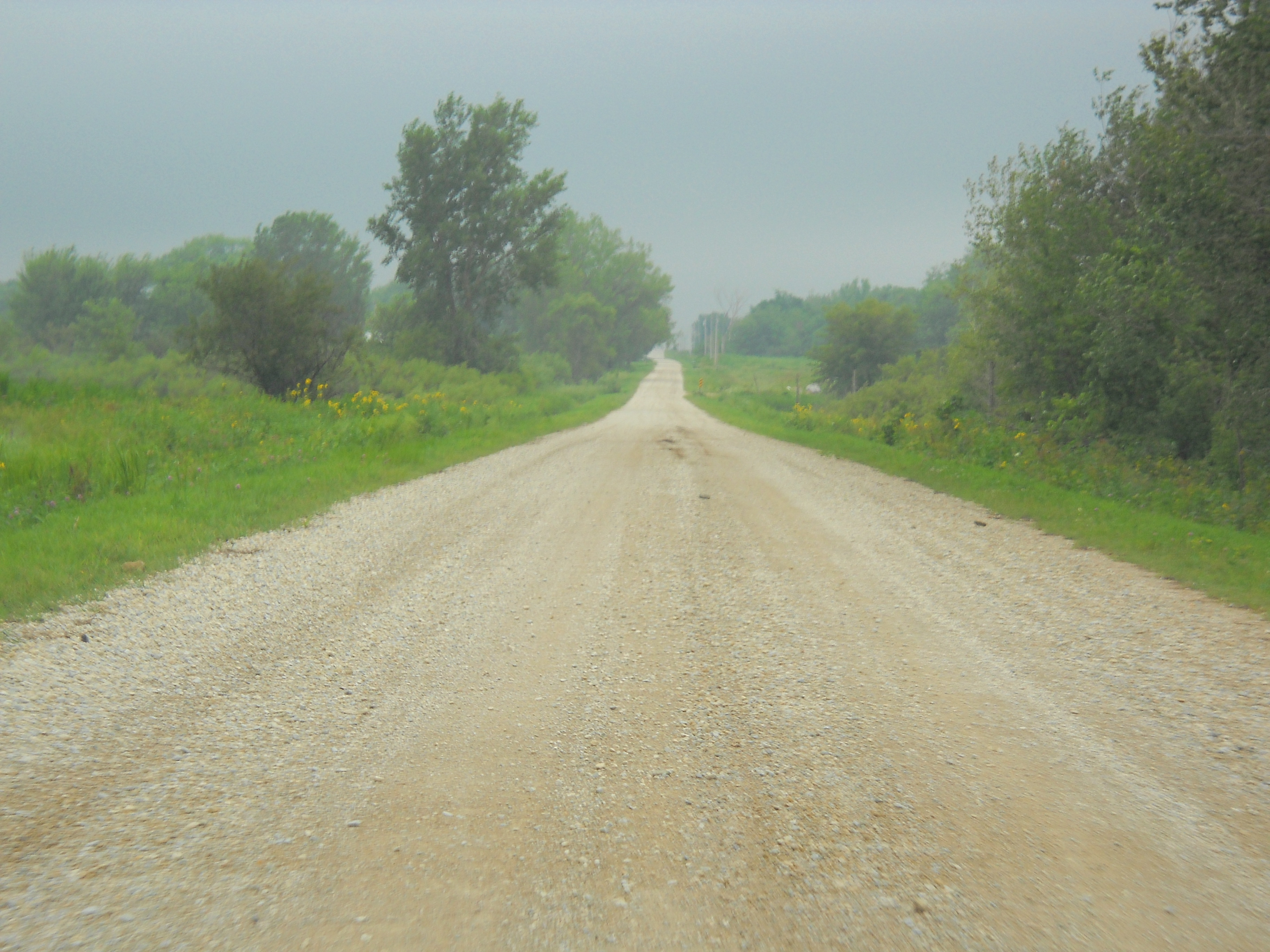
Donnan's main street, New Donnan Road, in 2009.

Plaque commemorating Donnan's 100th anniversary in 1978.

== See also ==
- List of Discontinued cities in Iowa
