= Protivin =

Protivin may refer to:

- Protivín, a town in the Czech Republic
- Protivin, Iowa, a town in the United States
