= Oran, Iowa =

- Unincorporated community
- Location within the state of Iowa Oran (the United States)
- Coordinates: 42°42′05″N 92°04′29″W
- Country: United States
- State: Iowa
- County: Fayette
- Elevation: 1,047 ft (319 m)
- Time zone: UTC-6 (Central (CST))
  - Summer (DST): UTC-5 (CDT)
- ZIP codes: 50664
- GNIS feature ID: 459879

Oran is an unincorporated community in southwestern Fayette County, Iowa, United States. It lies along local roads southwest of the city of West Union, the county seat of Fayette County, and west of the city of Oelwein, the largest city in Fayette County. Its elevation is 1,043 feet (318 m). Although Oran is unincorporated, it has a post office with the ZIP code of 50664.

== History ==
Oran's population in 1925 was 94. The population was 120 in 1940.

== Education ==
Oran is a part of the Wapsie Valley School District. The district's junior high school was located in Oran from 1961 until 1999, when it was closed due to a low budget.
