= Westgate, Iowa =

- City
- Location of Westgate, Iowa
- Coordinates: 42°46′06″N 91°59′54″W
- Country: United States
- State: Iowa
- County: Fayette
- Incorporated: July 6, 1896

Area
  - Total: 0.36 sq mi (0.94 km^{2})
  - Land: 0.36 sq mi (0.94 km^{2})
  - Water: 0 sq mi (0.00 km^{2})
- Elevation: 1,093 ft (333 m)

Population (2020)
  - Total: 192
  - Density: 527.8/sq mi (203.79/km^{2})
- Time zone: UTC-6 (Central (CST))
  - Summer (DST): UTC-5 (CDT)
- ZIP code: 50681
- Area code: 563
- FIPS code: 19-84180
- GNIS feature ID: 2397280
- Website: cityofwestgate.info

Westgate is a city in Fayette County, Iowa, United States. The population was 192 at the time of the 2020 census, down from 234 in 2000.

== History ==
Westgate celebrated "Westgate Days" on July 16, 2011, in honor of its 125th anniversary.

== Geography ==
According to the United States Census Bureau, the city has a total area of 0.36 square miles (0.93 km^{2}), all land.

== Demographics ==
Historical populations
Year	Pop.	±%
1900	260	—
1910	232	−10.8%
1920	255	+9.9%
1930	268	+5.1%
1940	247	−7.8%
1950	226	−8.5%
1960	214	−5.3%
1970	204	−4.7%
1980	263	+28.9%
1990	207	−21.3%
2000	234	+13.0%
2010	211	−9.8%
2020	192	−9.0%
Source:"U.S. Census website". United States Census Bureau. and Iowa Data Center; Source: U.S. Decennial Census

=== 2020 census ===
As of the census of 2020, there were 192 people, 92 households, and 57 families residing in the city. The population density was 527.8 inhabitants per square mile (203.8/km^{2}). There were 94 housing units at an average density of 258.4 per square mile (99.8/km^{2}). The racial makeup of the city was 94.3% White, 0.0% Black or African American, 0.5% Native American, 0.0% Asian, 0.0% Pacific Islander, 2.6% from other races and 2.6% from two or more races. Hispanic or Latino persons of any race comprised 2.6% of the population.

Of the 92 households, 30.4% of which had children under the age of 18 living with them, 37.0% were married couples living together, 17.4% were cohabitating couples, 21.7% had a female householder with no spouse or partner present and 23.9% had a male householder with no spouse or partner present. 38.0% of all households were non-families. 25.0% of all households were made up of individuals, 9.8% had someone living alone who was 65 years old or older.

The median age in the city was 42.7 years. 23.4% of the residents were under the age of 20; 3.6% were between the ages of 20 and 24; 25.5% were from 25 and 44; 30.7% were from 45 and 64; and 16.7% were 65 years of age or older. The gender makeup of the city was 51.0% male and 49.0% female.

=== 2010 census ===
As of the census of 2010, there were 211 people, 88 households, and 56 families living in the city. The population density was 586.1 inhabitants per square mile (226.3/km^{2}). There were 97 housing units at an average density of 269.4 per square mile (104.0/km^{2}). The racial makeup of the city was 98.6% White, 0.9% African American, and 0.5% from two or more races. Hispanic or Latino of any race were 0.5% of the population.

There were 88 households, of which 27.3% had children under the age of 18 living with them, 52.3% were married couples living together, 4.5% had a female householder with no husband present, 6.8% had a male householder with no wife present, and 36.4% were non-families. 27.3% of all households were made up of individuals, and 7.9% had someone living alone who was 65 years of age or older. The average household size was 2.40 and the average family size was 2.96.

The median age in the city was 42.6 years. 22.3% of residents were under the age of 18; 9.5% were between the ages of 18 and 24; 23.2% were from 25 to 44; 31.7% were from 45 to 64; and 13.3% were 65 years of age or older. The gender makeup of the city was 51.2% male and 48.8% female.

=== 2000 census ===
As of the census of 2000, there were 234 people, 90 households, and 63 families living in the city. The population density was 655.0 inhabitants per square mile (252.9/km^{2}). There were 94 housing units at an average density of 263.1 per square mile (101.6/km^{2}). The racial makeup of the city was 100.00% White. Hispanic or Latino of any race were 1.28% of the population.

There were 90 households, out of which 33.3% had children under the age of 18 living with them, 61.1% were married couples living together, 5.6% had a female householder with no husband present, and 30.0% were non-families. 23.3% of all households were made up of individuals, and 17.8% had someone living alone who was 65 years of age or older. The average household size was 2.60 and the average family size was 3.10.

In the city, the population was spread out, with 27.8% under the age of 18, 6.8% from 18 to 24, 24.8% from 25 to 44, 23.5% from 45 to 64, and 17.1% who were 65 years of age or older. The median age was 37 years. For every 100 females, there were 91.8 males. For every 100 females age 18 and over, there were 77.9 males.

The median income for a household in the city was $30,750, and the median income for a family was $43,438. Males had a median income of $29,375 versus $18,594 for females. The per capita income for the city was $14,709. About 1.5% of families and 7.6% of the population were below the poverty line, including 4.5% of those under the age of eighteen and 4.0% of those 65 or over.

== Education ==
The West Central Community School District operates local area public schools.
