= Maynard, Iowa =

- City
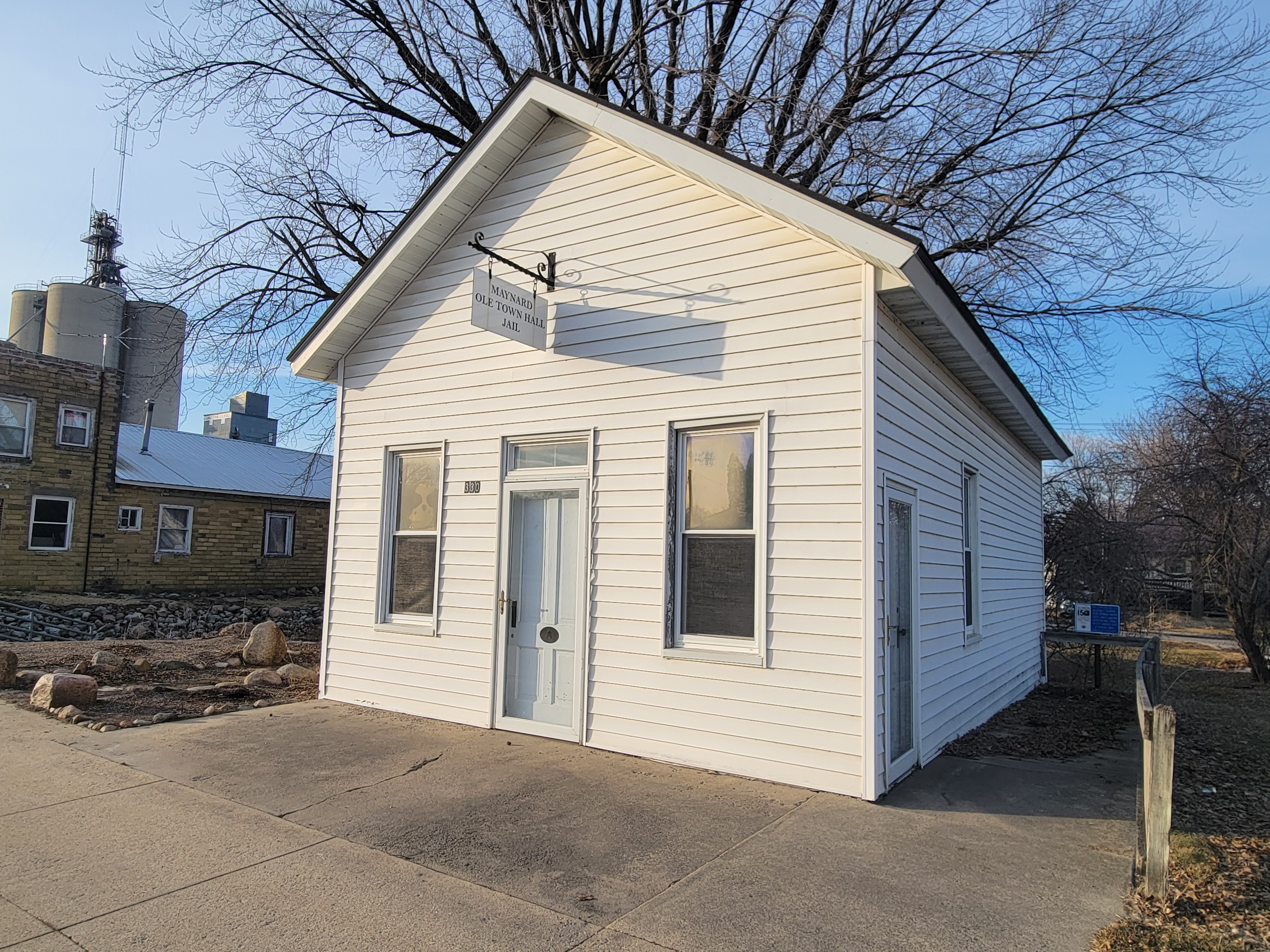
- The old town hall and jail

- Location of Maynard, Iowa
- Coordinates: 42°46′26″N 91°52′27″W
- Country: United States
- State: Iowa
- County: Fayette

Area
  - Total: 1.00 sq mi (2.58 km^{2})
  - Land: 0.97 sq mi (2.51 km^{2})
  - Water: 0.027 sq mi (0.07 km^{2})
- Elevation: 1,089 ft (332 m)

Population (2020)
  - Total: 476
  - Density: 491.3/sq mi (189.71/km^{2})
- Time zone: UTC-6 (Central (CST))
  - Summer (DST): UTC-5 (CDT)
- ZIP code: 50655
- Area code: 563
- FIPS code: 19-50610
- GNIS feature ID: 2395053

Maynard is a city in Fayette County, Iowa, United States. The population was 476 at the time of the 2020 census.

== Geography ==
Maynard is located on the Little Volga River.

According to the United States Census Bureau, the city has a total area of 1.02 square miles (2.64 km^{2}), of which 0.99 square miles (2.56 km^{2}) is land and 0.03 square miles (0.08 km^{2}) is water.

== Demographics ==
Historical populations
Year	Pop.	±%
1880	270	—
1890	371	+37.4%
1900	495	+33.4%
1910	382	−22.8%
1920	387	+1.3%
1930	409	+5.7%
1940	432	+5.6%
1950	455	+5.3%
1960	515	+13.2%
1970	503	−2.3%
1980	561	+11.5%
1990	513	−8.6%
2000	500	−2.5%
2010	518	+3.6%
2020	476	−8.1%
Source:"U.S. Census website". United States Census Bureau. and Iowa Data Center; Source: U.S. Decennial Census

=== 2020 census ===
As of the census of 2020, there were 476 people, 212 households, and 127 families residing in the city. The population density was 491.3 inhabitants per square mile (189.7/km^{2}). There were 236 housing units at an average density of 243.6 per square mile (94.1/km^{2}). The racial makeup of the city was 93.9% White, 0.4% Black or African American, 0.2% Native American, 0.0% Asian, 0.0% Pacific Islander, 1.3% from other races and 4.2% from two or more races. Hispanic or Latino persons of any race comprised 2.7% of the population.

Of the 212 households, 25.0% of which had children under the age of 18 living with them, 48.1% were married couples living together, 5.7% were cohabitating couples, 25.9% had a female householder with no spouse or partner present and 20.3% had a male householder with no spouse or partner present. 40.1% of all households were non-families. 36.8% of all households were made up of individuals, 15.1% had someone living alone who was 65 years old or older.

The median age in the city was 42.5 years. 26.3% of the residents were under the age of 20; 6.5% were between the ages of 20 and 24; 20.4% were from 25 and 44; 26.7% were from 45 and 64; and 20.2% were 65 years of age or older. The gender makeup of the city was 49.6% male and 50.4% female.

=== 2010 census ===
As of the census of 2010, there were 518 people, 228 households, and 141 families living in the city. The population density was 523.2 inhabitants per square mile (202.0/km^{2}). There were 239 housing units at an average density of 241.4 per square mile (93.2/km^{2}). The racial makeup of the city was 98.6% White, 0.2% African American, 0.8% from other races, and 0.4% from two or more races. Hispanic or Latino of any race were 2.5% of the population.

There were 228 households, of which 29.8% had children under the age of 18 living with them, 48.2% were married couples living together, 8.3% had a female householder with no husband present, 5.3% had a male householder with no wife present, and 38.2% were non-families. 31.6% of all households were made up of individuals, and 13.2% had someone living alone who was 65 years of age or older. The average household size was 2.27 and the average family size was 2.82.

The median age in the city was 42.8 years. 24.1% of residents were under the age of 18; 7.3% were between the ages of 18 and 24; 22.1% were from 25 to 44; 29.1% were from 45 to 64; and 17.2% were 65 years of age or older. The gender makeup of the city was 50.6% male and 49.4% female.

=== 2000 census ===
As of the census of 2000, there were 500 people, 222 households, and 138 families living in the city. The population density was 504.2 inhabitants per square mile (194.7/km^{2}). There were 238 housing units at an average density of 240.0 per square mile (92.7/km^{2}). The racial makeup of the city was 100.00% White. Hispanic or Latino of any race were 0.20% of the population.

There were 222 households, out of which 29.7% had children under the age of 18 living with them, 51.4% were married couples living together, 7.7% had a female householder with no husband present, and 37.4% were non-families. 34.7% of all households were made up of individuals, and 21.6% had someone living alone who was 65 years of age or older. The average household size was 2.25 and the average family size was 2.92.

In the city, the population was spread out, with 24.0% under the age of 18, 6.6% from 18 to 24, 26.8% from 25 to 44, 20.6% from 45 to 64, and 22.0% who were 65 years of age or older. The median age was 41 years. For every 100 females, there were 106.6 males. For every 100 females age 18 and over, there were 99.0 males.

The median income for a household in the city was $32,639, and the median income for a family was $40,833. Males had a median income of $28,929 versus $26,667 for females. The per capita income for the city was $15,779. About 4.4% of families and 8.1% of the population were below the poverty line, including 8.5% of those under age 18 and 9.8% of those age 65 or over.

== Education ==
Maynard is home to the West Central Community School District, which operates local public schools and competes in the Upper Iowa Conference for athletics.
