= Brainard, Iowa =

- unincorporated community
- Location of Brainard within the state of Iowa
- Coordinates: 42°55′51″N 91°42′19″W
- Country: United States
- State: Iowa
- County: Fayette County
- Elevation: 922 ft (281 m)
- Time zone: UTC-6 (Central (CST))
  - Summer (DST): UTC-5 (CDT)
- GNIS feature ID: 454804

Brainard is an unincorporated community in Fayette County, Iowa, United States. It is located at the junction of Echo Valley Road and F Avenue, four miles southwest of Elgin.

== History ==
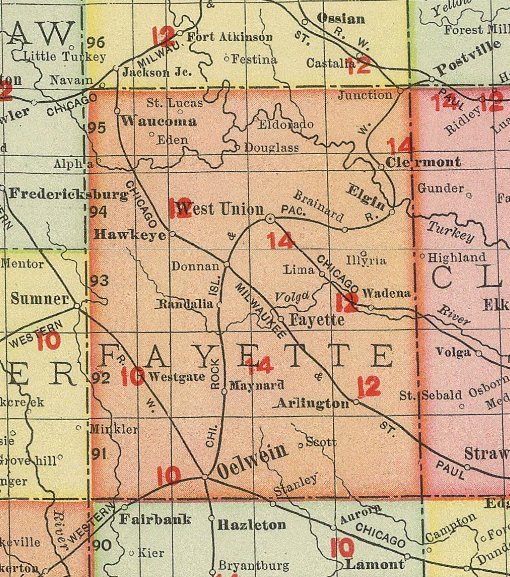
Brainard in Fayette County, Iowa, in 1903

Brainard's population was 25 in 1902, and 27 in 1925. The population was 40 in 1940.
