= Fayette County, Iowa =

County in Iowa, United States

- County
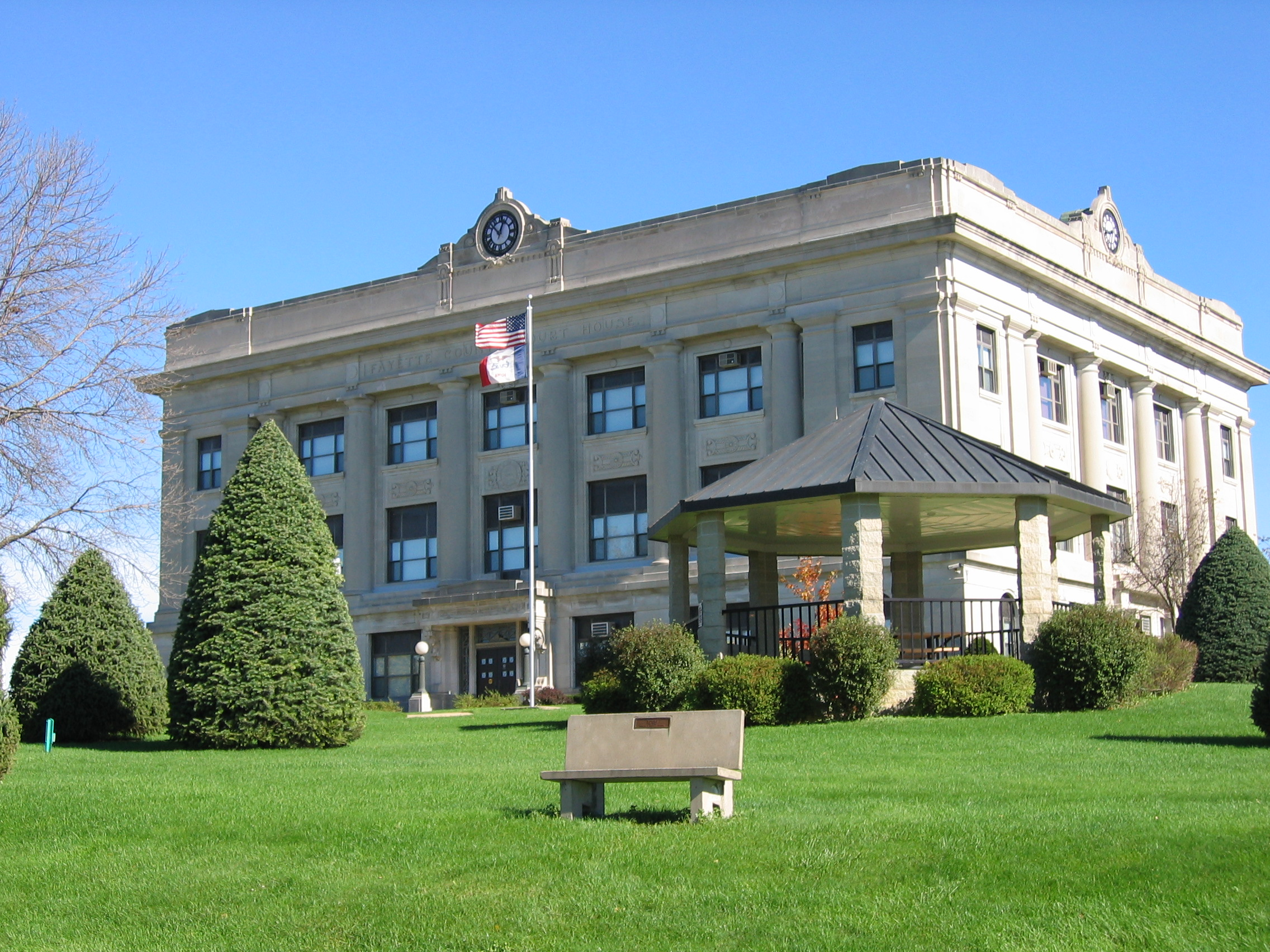
- The Fayette County Courthouse in West Union

- Location within the U.S. state of Iowa
- Coordinates: 42°51′54″N 91°50′58″W
- Country: United States
- State: Iowa
- Founded: December 21, 1837 (created); August 26, 1850 (organized)
- Named for: Marquis de Lafayette
- Seat: West Union
- Largest city: Oelwein

Area
  - Total: 731 sq mi (1,890 km^{2})
  - Land: 731 sq mi (1,890 km^{2})
  - Water: 0.5 sq mi (1.3 km^{2}) 0.07%

Population (2020)
  - Total: 19,509
  - Estimate (2025): 19,047 ▼
  - Density: 26.7/sq mi (10.3/km^{2})
- Time zone: UTC−6 (Central)
  - Summer (DST): UTC−5 (CDT)
- Congressional district: 2nd
- Website: fayettecounty.iowa.gov
- Iowa county number 33

Fayette County is a county located in the U.S. state of Iowa. As of the 2020 census, the population was 19,509. The county seat is West Union.

== History ==
Fayette County was founded on December 21, 1837, as a part of Wisconsin Territory. It was named after Gilbert du Motier, marquis de La Fayette, a French general and politician, who came to America in 1777 to fight in the Revolutionary War, and who was named Major General of the Continental Army. The county was formed as part of a large reorganization of Dubuque County, which at that time comprised most of the northern half of Iowa, Minnesota, and parts of the Dakotas. Fayette County was granted the Minnesota and Dakotas territory on that date. It became part of Iowa Territory when it was formed on July 4, 1838. Fayette County's size was drastically reduced into land that was part of the modern state of Iowa in 1843, then further split in 1847 after Iowa had achieved statehood. The county was organized in 1850.

== Geography ==
According to the United States Census Bureau, the county has a total area of 731 square miles (1,890 km^{2}), of which 731 square miles (1,890 km^{2}) is land and 0.5 square miles (1.3 km^{2}) (0.07%) is water.

=== Major highways ===
- U.S. Highway 18
- Iowa Highway 3
- Iowa Highway 56
- Iowa Highway 93
- Iowa Highway 150
- Iowa Highway 187
- Iowa Highway 281

=== Adjacent counties ===
- Allamakee County (northeast)
- Black Hawk County (southwest)
- Buchanan County (south)
- Bremer County (west)
- Chickasaw County (northwest)
- Clayton County (east)
- Delaware County (southeast)
- Winneshiek County (north)

== Demographics ==
Historical population
| Census | Pop. | Note | %± |
|---|---|---|---|
| 1850 | 825 | | — |
| 1860 | 12,073 | | 1,363.4% |
| 1870 | 16,973 | | 40.6% |
| 1880 | 22,258 | | 31.1% |
| 1890 | 23,141 | | 4.0% |
| 1900 | 29,845 | | 29.0% |
| 1910 | 27,919 | | −6.5% |
| 1920 | 29,251 | | 4.8% |
| 1930 | 29,145 | | −0.4% |
| 1940 | 29,151 | | 0.0% |
| 1950 | 28,294 | | −2.9% |
| 1960 | 28,581 | | 1.0% |
| 1970 | 26,898 | | −5.9% |
| 1980 | 25,488 | | −5.2% |
| 1990 | 21,843 | | −14.3% |
| 2000 | 22,008 | | 0.8% |
| 2010 | 20,880 | | −5.1% |
| 2020 | 19,509 | | −6.6% |
| 2025 (est.) | 19,047 | ▼ | −2.4% |
U.S. Decennial Census; 1790–1960 1900–1990; 1990–2000 2010–2020

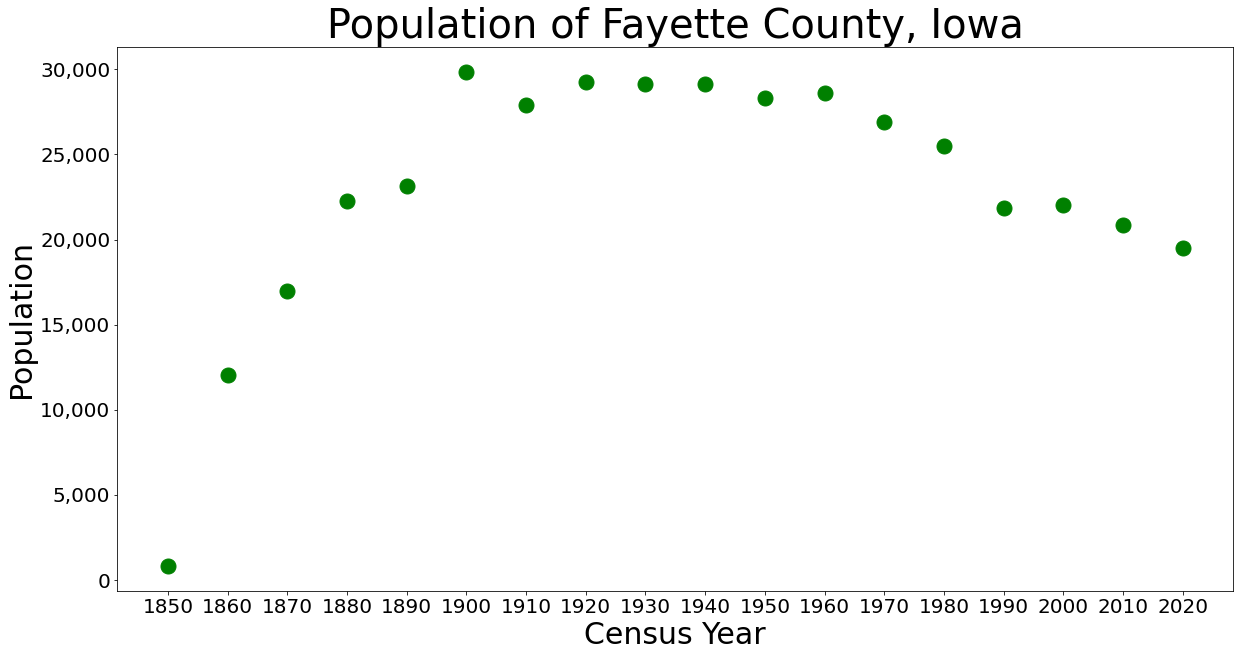
Population of Fayette County from US census data

=== 2020 census ===
As of the 2020 census, the county had a population of 19,509, with a population density of 26.7/sq mi (10.3/km^{2}). The median age was 44.0 years; 21.5% of residents were under the age of 18 and 22.8% of residents were 65 years of age or older. For every 100 females there were 103.1 males, and for every 100 females age 18 and over there were 100.8 males. 96.09% of the population reported being of one race.

The racial makeup of the county was 93.7% White, 1.0% Black or African American, 0.2% American Indian and Alaska Native, 0.4% Asian, <0.1% Native Hawaiian and Pacific Islander, 0.8% from some other race, and 3.9% from two or more races. Hispanic or Latino residents of any race comprised 2.7% of the population.

Fayette County Racial Composition
| Race | Number | Percent |
|---|---|---|
| White (NH) | 18,053 | 92.54% |
| Black or African American (NH) | 200 | 1.03% |
| Native American (NH) | 40 | 0.21% |
| Asian (NH) | 78 | 0.4% |
| Pacific Islander (NH) | 1 | 0.01% |
| Other/Mixed (NH) | 617 | 3.2% |
| Hispanic or Latino | 520 | 2.7% |

30.1% of residents lived in urban areas, while 69.9% lived in rural areas.

There were 8,174 households in the county, of which 23.8% had children under the age of 18 living in them. Of all households, 49.0% were married-couple households, 20.2% were households with a male householder and no spouse or partner present, and 23.4% were households with a female householder and no spouse or partner present. About 32.4% of all households were made up of individuals and 16.5% had someone living alone who was 65 years of age or older.

Of the 9,298 housing units, 8,174 were occupied and 12.1% were vacant. Among occupied housing units, 76.1% were owner-occupied and 23.9% were renter-occupied. The homeowner vacancy rate was 3.2% and the rental vacancy rate was 11.5%.

=== 2010 census ===
The 2010 census recorded a population of 20,880 in the county, with a population density of 28.6/sq mi (11.0/km^{2}). There were 9,558 housing units, of which 8,634 were occupied.

=== 2000 census ===
As of the census of 2000, there were 22,008 people, 8,778 households, and 5,951 families residing in the county. The population density was 30 people per square mile (12 people/km^{2}). There were 9,505 housing units at an average density of 13 units per square mile (5.0 units/km^{2}). The racial makeup of the county was 97.71% White, 0.53% Black or African American, 0.13% Native American, 0.40% Asian, 0.03% Pacific Islander, 0.43% from other races, and 0.77% from two or more races. 1.50% of the population were Hispanic or Latino of any race.

There were 8,778 households, out of which 30.40% had children under the age of 18 living with them, 56.80% were married couples living together, 7.40% had a female householder with no husband present, and 32.20% were non-families. 28.20% of all households were made up of individuals, and 15.00% had someone living alone who was 65 years of age or older. The average household size was 2.41 and the average family size was 2.96.

In the county, the population was spread out, with 25.00% under the age of 18, 8.60% from 18 to 24, 24.90% from 25 to 44, 22.40% from 45 to 64, and 19.00% who were 65 years of age or older. The median age was 39 years. For every 100 females there were 97.50 males. For every 100 females age 18 and over, there were 95.10 males.

The median income for a household in the county was $32,453, and the median income for a family was $39,960. Males had a median income of $27,493 versus $20,099 for females. The per capita income for the county was $17,271. About 8.20% of families and 10.80% of the population were below the poverty line, including 12.30% of those under age 18 and 12.00% of those age 65 or over.

== Communities ==
=== Cities ===
- Arlington
- Clermont
- Elgin
- Fayette
- Fairbank
- Hawkeye
- Maynard
- Oelwein
- St. Lucas
- Stanley
- Wadena
- Waucoma
- West Union
- Westgate

=== Census-designated Place ===
- Randalia

=== Unincorporated communities ===
- Alpha
- Brainard
- Donnan
- Douglas
- Eldorado
- Eden
- Lima
- Oran
- Richfield

=== Townships ===
Fayette County is divided into twenty townships:

- Auburn
- Banks
- Bethel
- Center
- Clermont
- Dover
- Eden
- Fairfield
- Fremont
- Harlan
- Illyria
- Jefferson
- Oran
- Pleasant Valley
- Putnam
- Scott
- Smithfield
- Union
- Westfield
- Windsor

=== Population ranking ===
The population ranking of the following table is based on the 2020 census of Fayette County.

† county seat

| Rank | City/Town/etc. | Municipal type | Population (2020 Census) |
|---|---|---|---|
| 1 | Oelwein | City | 5,920 |
| 2 | † West Union | City | 2,490 |
| 3 | Sumner (mostly in Bremer County) | City | 2,030 |
| 4 | Fayette | City | 1,256 |
| 5 | Fairbank (partially in Buchanan County) | City | 1,111 |
| 6 | Elgin | City | 685 |
| 7 | Clermont | City | 586 |
| 8 | Maynard | City | 476 |
| 9 | Hawkeye | City | 438 |
| 10 | Arlington | City | 419 |
| 11 | Waucoma | City | 229 |
| 12 | Wadena | City | 209 |
| 13 | Westgate | City | 192 |
| 14 | St. Lucas | City | 167 |
| 15 | Stanley (mostly in Buchanan County) | City | 81 |
| 16 | Randalia | City | 50 |

== Politics ==
United States presidential election results for Fayette County, Iowa
| Year | Republican | | Democratic | | Third party(ies) | |
| Year | No. | % | No. | % | No. | % |
|---|---|---|---|---|---|---|
| 1896 | 3,522 | 54.69% | 2,822 | 43.82% | 96 | 1.49% |
| 1900 | 3,984 | 58.39% | 2,708 | 39.69% | 131 | 1.92% |
| 1904 | 3,978 | 62.39% | 2,070 | 32.47% | 328 | 5.14% |
| 1908 | 3,369 | 56.83% | 2,281 | 38.48% | 278 | 4.69% |
| 1912 | 1,192 | 19.14% | 2,379 | 38.20% | 2,656 | 42.65% |
| 1916 | 3,872 | 60.81% | 2,311 | 36.30% | 184 | 2.89% |
| 1920 | 8,265 | 79.14% | 1,941 | 18.58% | 238 | 2.28% |
| 1924 | 5,974 | 50.21% | 1,272 | 10.69% | 4,652 | 39.10% |
| 1928 | 8,338 | 66.66% | 4,061 | 32.46% | 110 | 0.88% |
| 1932 | 5,166 | 39.67% | 7,690 | 59.05% | 166 | 1.27% |
| 1936 | 5,891 | 43.97% | 7,210 | 53.82% | 296 | 2.21% |
| 1940 | 8,237 | 57.43% | 6,066 | 42.30% | 39 | 0.27% |
| 1944 | 6,693 | 56.50% | 5,105 | 43.09% | 48 | 0.41% |
| 1948 | 6,296 | 53.54% | 5,303 | 45.09% | 161 | 1.37% |
| 1952 | 9,152 | 67.35% | 4,403 | 32.40% | 34 | 0.25% |
| 1956 | 7,914 | 61.51% | 4,935 | 38.36% | 17 | 0.13% |
| 1960 | 8,330 | 61.20% | 5,256 | 38.62% | 25 | 0.18% |
| 1964 | 5,567 | 44.60% | 6,900 | 55.28% | 15 | 0.12% |
| 1968 | 6,935 | 59.34% | 4,098 | 35.06% | 654 | 5.60% |
| 1972 | 7,263 | 60.83% | 4,413 | 36.96% | 264 | 2.21% |
| 1976 | 6,618 | 54.69% | 5,220 | 43.13% | 264 | 2.18% |
| 1980 | 6,374 | 55.32% | 4,377 | 37.98% | 772 | 6.70% |
| 1984 | 6,505 | 57.56% | 4,677 | 41.38% | 120 | 1.06% |
| 1988 | 4,921 | 47.84% | 5,304 | 51.56% | 62 | 0.60% |
| 1992 | 3,879 | 35.71% | 4,412 | 40.62% | 2,570 | 23.66% |
| 1996 | 3,848 | 39.98% | 4,832 | 50.21% | 944 | 9.81% |
| 2000 | 4,747 | 49.34% | 4,640 | 48.23% | 234 | 2.43% |
| 2004 | 5,128 | 49.35% | 5,185 | 49.89% | 79 | 0.76% |
| 2008 | 4,205 | 40.98% | 5,908 | 57.57% | 149 | 1.45% |
| 2012 | 4,492 | 43.33% | 5,732 | 55.30% | 142 | 1.37% |
| 2016 | 5,620 | 56.34% | 3,689 | 36.98% | 666 | 6.68% |
| 2020 | 6,145 | 60.33% | 3,835 | 37.65% | 206 | 2.02% |
| 2024 | 6,325 | 64.23% | 3,334 | 33.85% | 189 | 1.92% |

== Education ==
School districts include:

- North Fayette Valley Community School District - Formed on July 1, 2018.
- Oelwein Community School District
- Postville Community School District
- Starmont Community School District
- Sumner-Fredericksburg Community School District
- Turkey Valley Community School District
- Wapsie Valley Community School District
- West Central Community School District

Former school districts include:

- North Fayette Community School District - Merged into North Fayette Valley on July 1, 2018.
- Valley Community School District - Merged into North Fayette Valley on July 1, 2018.

== See also ==
- National Register of Historic Places listings in Fayette County, Iowa
