= Richfield, Iowa =

- Unincorporated community
- Location within Iowa
- Coordinates: 42°57′01″N 92°03′46″W
- Country: United States
- State: Iowa
- County: Fayette
- Elevation: 1,171 ft (357 m)
- Time zone: UTC-6 (Central (CST))
  - Summer (DST): UTC-5 (CDT)
- Area code: 563
- GNIS feature ID: 464716

Richfield is an unincorporated community in Fayette County, Iowa, United States.

== Geography ==
Richfield is in Bethel Township, and is located 5 miles (8.0 km) from West Union, the county seat.

== History ==
The Richfield post office was established on July 8, 1856, with James A. McOall as the postmaster. It was discontinued on Oct. 7, 1857. It was reestablished June 4, 1858. It was discontinued in 1874.

The Richfield Lutheran church was founded in 1880, through the efforts of Reverend C. Ide. The Richfield church boasted a membership of 325 in 1910.

The population was 6 in 1940.

== See also ==
- Eldorado, Iowa
