= Douglas, Iowa =

- unincorporated community
- Location of Douglas within the state of Iowa
- Coordinates: 43°00′30″N 91°52′17″W
- Country: United States
- State: Iowa
- County: Fayette County
- Elevation: 967 ft (295 m)
- Time zone: UTC-6 (Central (CST))
  - Summer (DST): UTC-5 (CDT)
- GNIS feature ID: 463549

Douglas is an unincorporated community in Fayette County, Iowa, United States. It is located near the junction of County Road B44 and Maple Road, three miles southwest of Eldorado.

== History ==
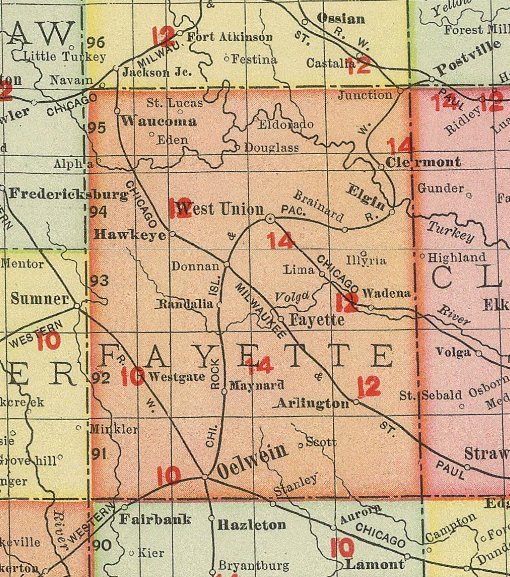
Douglas in Fayette County, Iowa, in 1903

Douglas was originally spelled Douglass. The population of the community was 216 in 1902, and was 105 in 1925. The population was 40 in 1940.
