= North Fayette Community School District =

Former school district in Iowa, USA

North Fayette Community School District was a school district headquartered in West Union, Iowa.

The district is located in sections of Fayette County, and served West Union, Fayette, and Hawkeye.

== History ==
On July 1, 1984, the Fayette School District merged into the North Fayette School District.

The merger vote for North Fayette and Valley was scheduled for Tuesday February 7, 2017. The North Fayette district residents voted in favor of the merger on a 504–17, or 97% in favor, while the Valley residents voted in favor on a 326-30 basis, or 92% in favor. On July 1, 2018, it merged into the Valley district to form the North Fayette Valley Community School District. The two districts together had one middle school and one high school.

In 2013, the North Fayette Community School District merged with the Valley Community School District to form the North Fayette Valley Community School District. This consolidation was part of a broader trend in Iowa, where rural school districts combined resources to better serve students despite declining enrollments and budgetary constraints. The merger aimed to optimize educational opportunities, maintain a broad curriculum, and enhance extracurricular activities for students from both districts.

== Schools ==
At one point the district had three elementary schools, one each in Fayette, Hawkeye, and West Union, as well as one middle school and one high school.

At a later period the district operated three schools: North Fayette Elementary School in Hawkeye, North Fayette Middle School in Fayette, and North Fayette High School in West Union.
