= Eldorado, Iowa =

- unincorporated community
- Location of Eldorado within the state of Iowa
- Coordinates: 43°03′02″N 91°50′08″W
- Country: United States
- State: Iowa
- County: Fayette County
- Elevation: 932 ft (284 m)
- Time zone: UTC-6 (Central (CST))
  - Summer (DST): UTC-5 (CDT)
- GNIS feature ID: 456267

Eldorado is an unincorporated community in Fayette County, Iowa, United States. It is located at the junction of Iowa State Highway 150 and Major Road, six miles northeast of West Union.

== History ==
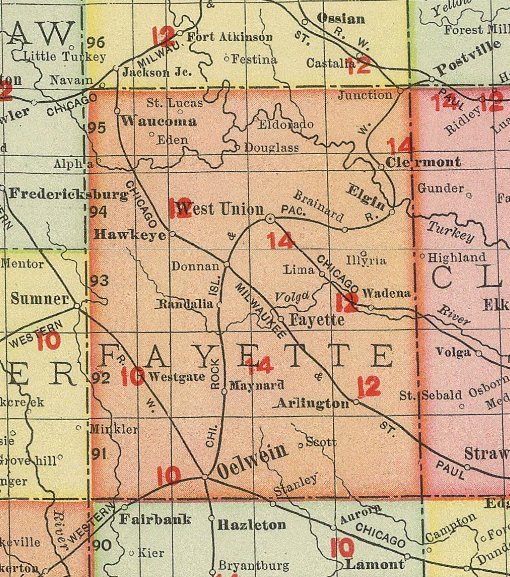
Eldorado in Fayette County, Iowa, in 1903

Eldorado is the eastern part of Auburn Township. Eldorado's population was 179 in 1902, and 165 in 1925. The population was 103 in 1940.

== Notable people ==
- William Foege (born 1936), American physician and epidemiologist
