= Hawkeye, Iowa =

- City
- Location of Hawkeye, Iowa
- Coordinates: 42°56′16″N 91°57′01″W
- Country: USA
- State: Iowa
- County: Fayette

Area
  - Total: 0.67 sq mi (1.74 km^{2})
  - Land: 0.67 sq mi (1.74 km^{2})
  - Water: 0 sq mi (0.00 km^{2})
- Elevation: 1,165 ft (355 m)

Population (2020)
  - Total: 438
  - Density: 652.1/sq mi (251.77/km^{2})
- Time zone: UTC-6 (Central (CST))
  - Summer (DST): UTC-5 (CDT)
- ZIP code: 52147
- Area code: 563
- FIPS code: 19-35310
- GNIS feature ID: 2394331
- Website: hawkeyeia.gov

Hawkeye is a city in Fayette County, Iowa, United States. The population was 438 at the time of the 2020 census.

== Geography ==
According to the United States Census Bureau, the city has a total area of 0.67 square miles (1.74 km^{2}), all land.

== Demographics ==
Historical populations
Year	Pop.	±%
1900	518	—
1910	510	−1.5%
1920	582	+14.1%
1930	530	−8.9%
1940	544	+2.6%
1950	511	−6.1%
1960	516	+1.0%
1970	529	+2.5%
1980	512	−3.2%
1990	460	−10.2%
2000	489	+6.3%
2010	449	−8.2%
2020	438	−2.4%
Source:"U.S. Census website". United States Census Bureau. and Iowa Data Center; Source: U.S. Decennial Census

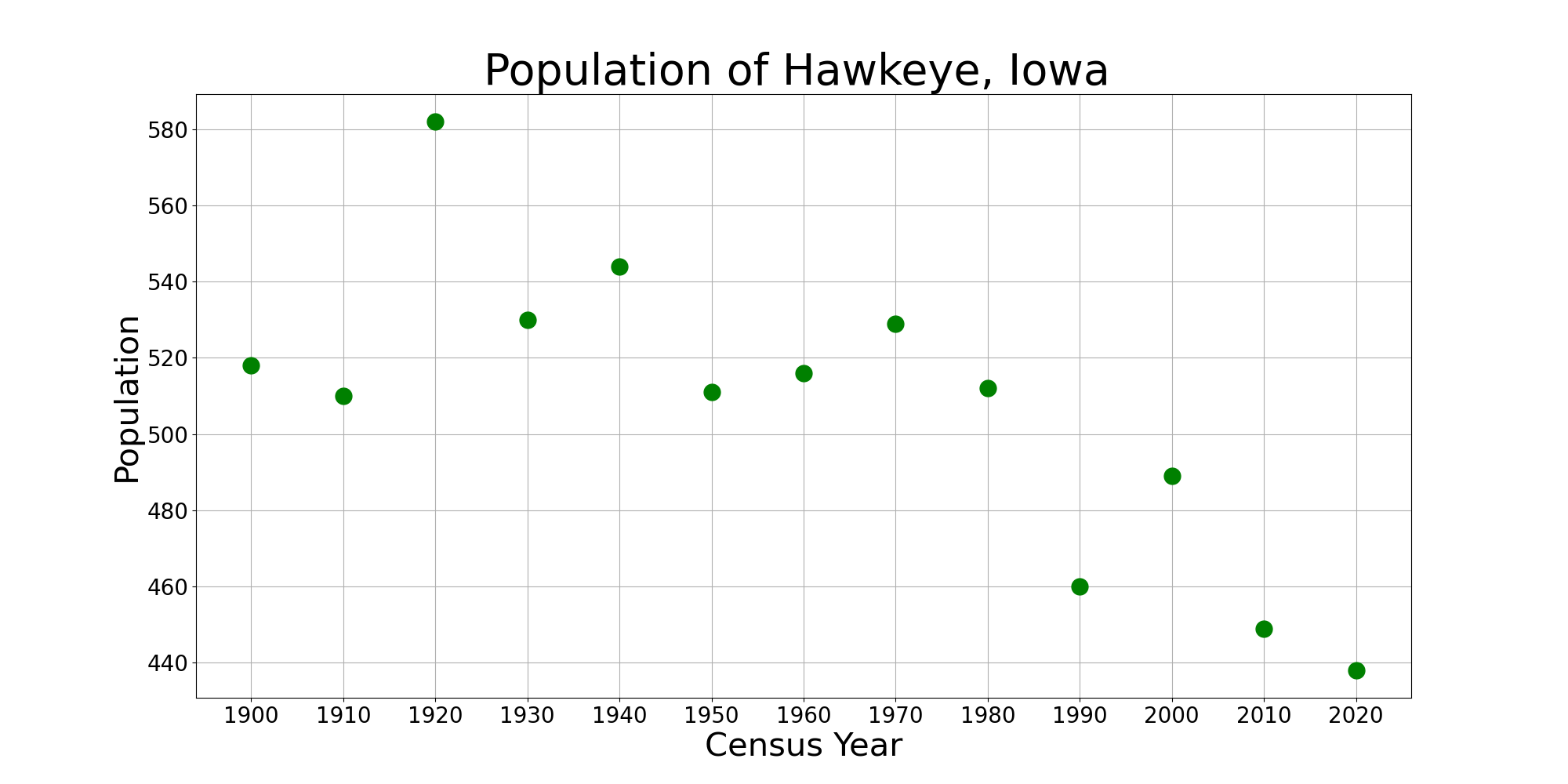
The population of Hawkeye, Iowa from US census data

=== 2020 census ===
The 2020 United States census counted 438 people, 181 households, and 116 families in Hawkeye. The population density was 651.8 per square mile (251.7/km^{2}). There were 220 housing units at an average density of 327.4 per square mile (126.4/km^{2}). The racial makeup was 92.92% (407) white or European American (92.69% non-Hispanic white), 0.0% (0) black or African-American, 0.0% (0) Native American or Alaska Native, 0.0% (0) Asian, 0.0% (0) Pacific Islander or Native Hawaiian, 1.14% (5) from other races, and 5.94% (26) from two or more races. Hispanic or Latino of any race was 1.83% (8) of the population.

Of the 181 households, 22.7% had children under the age of 18; 48.6% were married couples living together; 23.8% had a female householder with no spouse or partner present. 28.7% of households consisted of individuals and 17.1% had someone living alone who was 65 years of age or older. The average household size was 2.4 and the average family size was 3.2. The percent of those with a bachelor’s degree or higher was estimated to be 9.1% of the population.

21.0% of the population was under the age of 18, 7.5% from 18 to 24, 24.7% from 25 to 44, 24.7% from 45 to 64, and 22.1% who were 65 years of age or older. The median age was 41.7 years. For every 100 females, there were 102.8 males. For every 100 females ages 18 and older, there were 95.5 males.

The 2016–2020 5-year American Community Survey estimates show that the median household income was $43,333 (with a margin of error of +/- $15,357) and the median family income was $58,125 (+/- $20,618). Males had a median income of $29,410 (+/- $4,737) versus $22,344 (+/- $6,115) for females. The median income for those above 16 years old was $28,581 (+/- $1,981). Approximately, 6.2% of families and 11.5% of the population were below the poverty line, including 13.3% of those under the age of 18 and 7.1% of those ages 65 or over.

=== 2010 census ===
As of the census of 2010, there were 449 people, 201 households, and 123 families residing in the city. The population density was 670.1 inhabitants per square mile (258.7/km^{2}). There were 227 housing units at an average density of 338.8 per square mile (130.8/km^{2}). The racial makeup of the city was 99.1% White, 0.7% African American, and 0.2% Native American. Hispanic or Latino of any race were 0.2% of the population.

There were 201 households, of which 25.4% had children under the age of 18 living with them, 47.3% were married couples living together, 10.0% had a female householder with no husband present, 4.0% had a male householder with no wife present, and 38.8% were non-families. 36.3% of all households were made up of individuals, and 19.9% had someone living alone who was 65 years of age or older. The average household size was 2.23 and the average family size was 2.89.

The median age in the city was 43.8 years. 20.7% of residents were under the age of 18; 10.1% were between the ages of 18 and 24; 20.9% were from 25 to 44; 27.6% were from 45 to 64; and 20.7% were 65 years of age or older. The gender makeup of the city was 50.6% male and 49.4% female.

The median income for a household in the city was $30,333, and the median income for a family was $38,438. Males had a median income of $25,781 versus $20,781 for females. The per capita income for the city was $14,319. About 6.0% of families and 8.6% of the population were below the poverty line, including 7.7% of those under age 18 and 15.2% of those age 65 or over.

== Education ==
Hawkeye is a part of the North Fayette Valley Community School District. It was previously a part of the North Fayette Community School District, which merged into the North Fayette Valley district on July 1, 2018.

== Economy ==
=== Windfarm ===
Located primarily between Hawkeye and Richfield, a 36 megawatt (MW) windfarm was constructed in 2012. The Hawkeye windfarm is owned by RPM Access and consists of 15 Nordex 2.5 MW turbines mounted on 100 meters (330 feet) tall towers. Central Iowa Power Cooperative is purchasing the power generated by the project under a long-term power purchase agreement and is distributing the power to its member cooperatives. The Hawkeye wind project hosted a ribbon cutting ceremony on October 8, 2012. The keynote speaker and guest of honor was Senator Chuck Grassley. See Video of Chuck Grassley
