= Alpha, Iowa =

- unincorporated community
- Location of Alpha within the state of Iowa
- Coordinates: 42°59′48″N 92°02′52″W
- Country: United States
- State: Iowa
- County: Fayette County
- Elevation: 1,040 ft (317 m)
- Time zone: UTC-6 (Central (CST))
  - Summer (DST): UTC-5 (CDT)
- ZIP code: 52171
- Area code: 563
- GNIS feature ID: 454149

Alpha is an unincorporated community in Fayette County, Iowa, United States. It is located on Johnsons Mill Road near County Road V68, three miles south of Waucoma, at 42.995718N, -92.047995W, where Johnsons Mill Road crosses Crane Creek.

== History ==
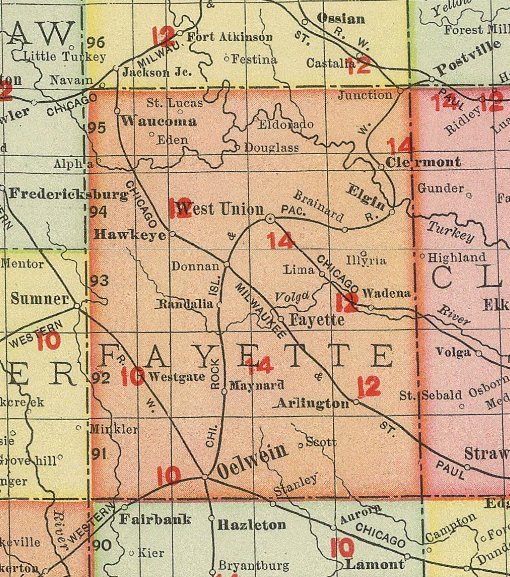
Alpha in Fayette County, Iowa, in 1903

Alpha was founded in May 1871. It was named Alpha, the first letter of the Greek alphabet, because it was the first community on Crane Creek.

Alpha's population was 100 in 1925. The population was 119 in 1940.
