= Lima, Iowa =

- unincorporated community
- Location of Lima within the state of Iowa
- Coordinates: 42°52′06″N 91°44′35″W
- Country: United States
- State: Iowa
- County: Fayette County
- Elevation: 932 ft (284 m)
- Time zone: UTC-6 (Central (CST))
  - Summer (DST): UTC-5 (CDT)
- GNIS feature ID: 464619

Lima is an unincorporated community in Fayette County, Iowa, United States. It is located at the junction of Ivy Road and Heron Road, four miles northeast of Fayette. and within a mile of the abandoned settlement of Albany.

== History ==
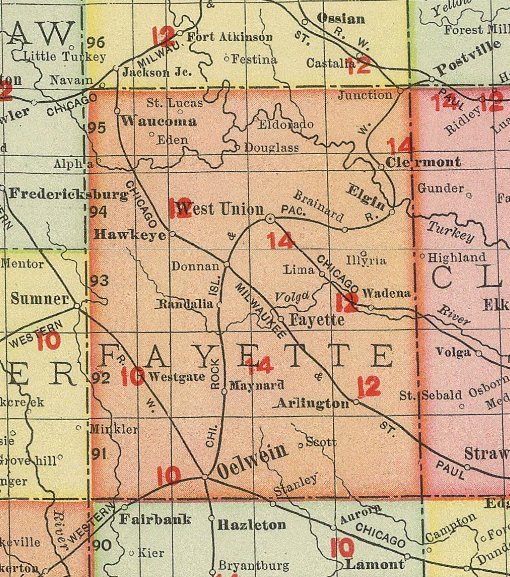
Lima in Fayette County, Iowa, in 1903

Lima's population was 25 in 1902, and was 32 in 1925. The population was 30 in 1940.
