= Stapleton Township, Chickasaw County, Iowa =

Stapleton Township
- Township
- Location in Chickasaw County
- Coordinates: 43°02′07″N 092°08′53″W
- Country: United States
- State: Iowa
- County: Chickasaw

Area
  - Total: 36.49 sq mi (94.51 km^{2})
  - Land: 36.48 sq mi (94.48 km^{2})
  - Water: 0.012 sq mi (0.03 km^{2}) 0.03%
- Elevation: 1,119 ft (341 m)

Population (2000)
  - Total: 781
  - Density: 21/sq mi (8.3/km^{2})
- GNIS feature ID: 0468750

Stapleton Township is one of twelve townships in Chickasaw County, Iowa, United States. As of the 2000 census, its population was 781.

== History ==
Stapleton Township was organized in 1857. It is named for Thomas G. Staples, an early settler and local postmaster.

== Geography ==
Stapleton Township covers an area of 36.49 square miles (94.5 km^{2}) and contains one incorporated settlement, Lawler. According to the USGS, it contains six cemeteries: Lutheran, Our Lady of Mount Carmel, Saint Johns, Saint Johns German Lutheran, Stapleton Township and Stapleton Township.
