= West Central Community School District =

Public school district in Maynard, Iowa, United States

Coordinates: 42.770442°N 91.880533°W

Location
- Maynard, Iowa Fayette County United States
- Coordinates: 42.770442, -91.880533

District information
- Type: Local school district
- Grades: K-12
- Superintendent: Fred Matlage
- Schools: 2
- Budget: $5,307,000 (2020-21)
- NCES District ID: 1930870

Students and staff
- Students: 321 (2022-23)
- Teachers: 25.48 FTE
- Staff: 28.48 FTE
- Student–teacher ratio: 12.60
- Athletic conference: Upper Iowa
- District mascot: Blue Devils
- Colors: Blue and White

Other information
- Website: www.w-central.k12.ia.us

The West Central Community School District is a rural public school district headquartered in Maynard, Iowa.

The district is located completely within Fayette County, and serves Maynard, Randalia, Westgate, and the surrounding rural areas.

The mascot is the Blue Devils, and the colors are blue and white.

== Schools ==
The district operates two schools in a single facility in Maynard:

- West Central PK-8 School
- West Central Charter High School

=== West Central High School ===
==== Athletics ====
The Blue Devils compete in the Upper Iowa Conference in the following sports:

- Cross Country
- Volleyball
- Football
  - 1997 Class A State Champions
  - The Blue Devils notably held the defending state champions, Don Bosco, to only 16 points in 2018
- Basketball
  - Girls 2-time State Champions (1956, 1958)
- Wrestling (with Oelwein)
- Bowling (with Oelwein)
- Track and Field
- Golf
- Soccer
- Baseball
- Softball
  - 1958 State Champions

== See also ==
- List of school districts in Iowa
- List of high schools in Iowa
