= West Union, Iowa =

- City
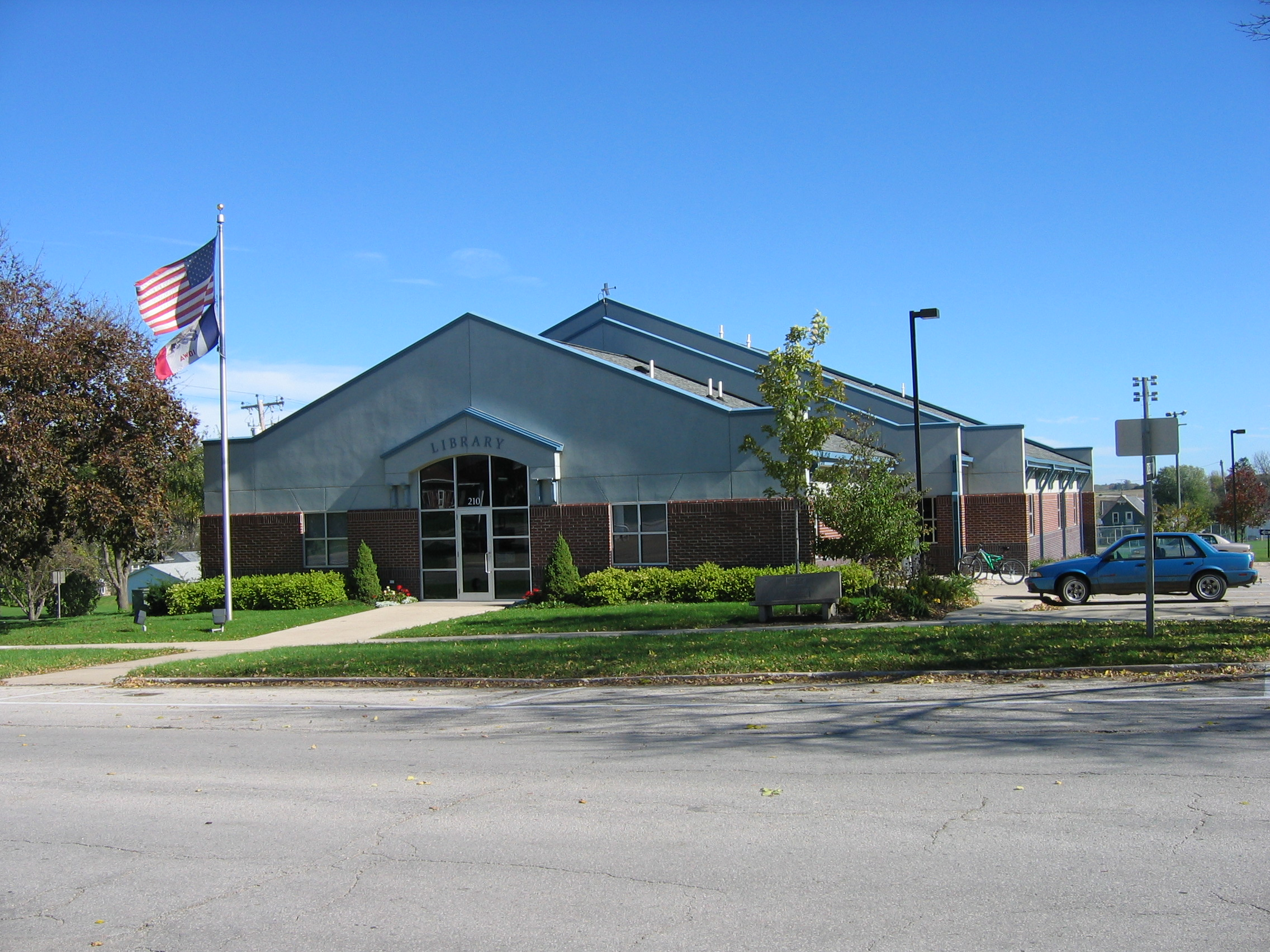
- West Union Heiserman Library
- Motto: Deeply connected
- Location of West Union, Iowa
- Coordinates: 42°57′32″N 91°48′47″W
- Country: United States
- State: Iowa
- County: Fayette
- Incorporated: December 7, 1879

Area
  - Total: 2.75 sq mi (7.11 km^{2})
  - Land: 2.75 sq mi (7.11 km^{2})
  - Water: 0 sq mi (0.00 km^{2})
- Elevation: 1,161 ft (354 m)

Population (2020)
  - Total: 2,490
  - Density: 906.5/sq mi (350.02/km^{2})
- Time zone: UTC-6 (Central (CST))
  - Summer (DST): UTC-5 (CDT)
- ZIP code: 52175
- Area code: 563
- FIPS code: 19-84765
- GNIS feature ID: 468989
- Website: www.westunion.com

West Union is a city in Fayette County, Iowa, United States. The population was 2,490 at the time of the 2020 census. It is the county seat of Fayette County.

== History ==
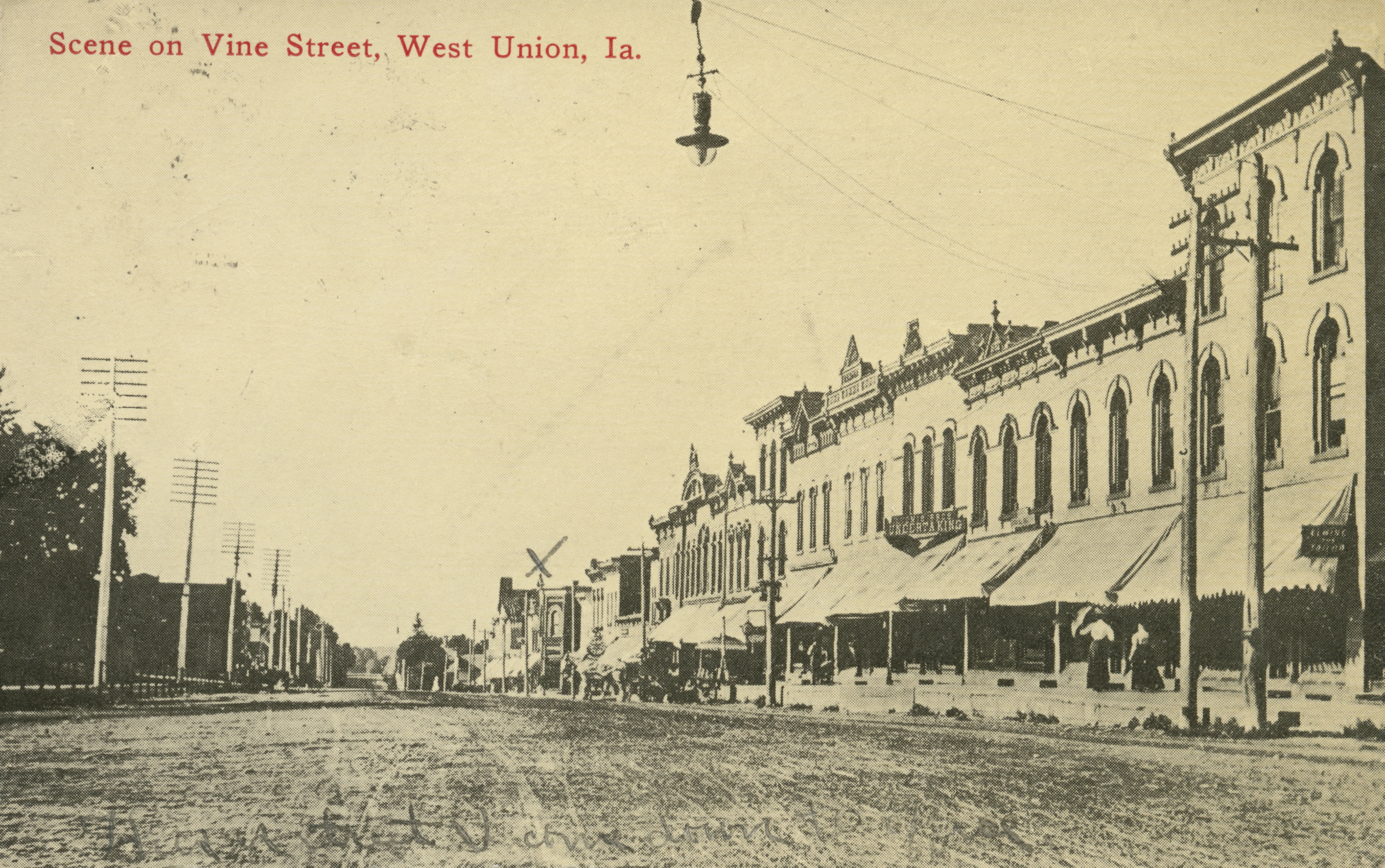
Downtown, West Union, Iowa 1910

Originally called Knob Prairie, the community was founded by William Wells, naming it for his hometown, also called West Union, in Ohio. The vacuum cleaner was invented here in 1860 by Daniel Hess.

== Geography ==
West Union is located at 42°57′43″N 91°48′36″W (42.962035, -91.810055).

According to the United States Census Bureau, the city has a total area of 2.78 square miles (7.20 km^{2}), all land.

The city lies at the junction of U.S. Route 18 with Iowa Highways 56 and 150.

West Union is the home of the North Fayette Valley Community School District, which comprises the communities of West Union; Clermont; Elgin; Wadena; Hawkeye; Fayette, the unincorporated town of Alpha and the surrounding rural areas.

North Fayette and Valley Community Schools combined services in 2013 with the high school in West Union and the middle school in Elgin. The new school's mascot is called the Tigerhawks, due to the merging of the schools mascots, the Valley Tigers and the North Fayette Hawks. This agreement came about as a result of low enrollment and less state aid. The agreement was intended to last until the end of the 2015–2016 school year, when the school boards could decide to either: continue the whole-grade sharing agreement, end the agreement and go back to the North Fayette and Valley school districts, or officially consolidate the two districts. In July, 2018, after overwhelming majorities from both districts agreed to the merger, the district officially became North Fayette Valley.

== Demographics ==
West Union historical population
Year	Pop.	±%
1870	1,489	—
1880	1,551	+4.2%
1890	1,676	+8.1%
1900	1,935	+15.5%
1910	1,652	−14.6%
1920	1,777	+7.6%
1930	2,056	+15.7%
1940	2,059	+0.1%
1950	2,141	+4.0%
1960	2,551	+19.1%
1970	2,624	+2.9%
1980	2,783	+6.1%
1990	2,490	−10.5%
2000	2,549	+2.4%
2010	2,486	−2.5%
2020	2,490	+0.2%
Source: "U.S. Census website". United States Census Bureau. Source: U.S. Decennial Census

=== 2020 census ===
As of the 2020 census, there were 2,490 people, 1,103 households, and 570 families residing in the city. The population density was 906.5 inhabitants per square mile (350.0/km^{2}). There were 1,232 housing units at an average density of 448.5 per square mile (173.2/km^{2}).

Of the 1,103 households, 21.8% had children under the age of 18 living with them, 39.8% were married-couple households, 6.5% were cohabiting-couple households, 30.4% had a female householder with no spouse or partner present, and 23.3% had a male householder with no spouse or partner present. Non-family households made up 48.3% of all households. About 41.8% of all households were made up of individuals, and 19.8% had someone living alone who was 65 years of age or older. There were 1,232 housing units, of which 10.5% were vacant. The homeowner vacancy rate was 4.3% and the rental vacancy rate was 7.9%.

The median age was 42.0 years. 22.2% of residents were under the age of 20; 6.9% were between the ages of 20 and 24; 23.7% were from 25 to 44; 23.1% were from 45 to 64; and 24.1% were 65 years of age or older. For every 100 females, there were 103.8 males, and for every 100 females age 18 and over there were 98.0 males age 18 and over.

0.0% of residents lived in urban areas, while 100.0% lived in rural areas.

Racial composition as of the 2020 census
Race	Number	Percent
White	2,312	92.9%
Black or African American	42	1.7%
American Indian and Alaska Native	6	0.2%
Asian	17	0.7%
Native Hawaiian and Other Pacific Islander	0	0.0%
Some other race	41	1.6%
Two or more races	72	2.9%
Hispanic or Latino (of any race)	87	3.5%

=== 2010 census ===
As of the census of 2010, there were 2,486 people, 1,106 households, and 626 families living in the city. The population density was 894.2 inhabitants per square mile (345.3/km^{2}). There were 1,240 housing units at an average density of 446.0 per square mile (172.2/km^{2}). The racial makeup of the city was 96.4% White, 1.1% African American, 0.2% Native American, 0.8% Asian, 0.3% Pacific Islander, 0.6% from other races, and 0.6% from two or more races. Hispanic or Latino of any race were 2.0% of the population.

There were 1,106 households, of which 24.7% had children under the age of 18 living with them, 45.0% were married couples living together, 8.2% had a female householder with no husband present, 3.3% had a male householder with no wife present, and 43.4% were non-families. 38.2% of all households were made up of individuals, and 16.9% had someone living alone who was 65 years of age or older. The average household size was 2.12 and the average family size was 2.80.

The median age in the city was 42.4 years. 21.9% of residents were under the age of 18; 7.9% were between the ages of 18 and 24; 23.1% were from 25 to 44; 24.9% were from 45 to 64; and 22.2% were 65 years of age or older. The gender makeup of the city was 49.5% male and 50.5% female.

=== 2000 census ===
As of the census of 2000, there were 2,549 people, 1,107 households, and 660 families living in the city. The population density was 947.8 inhabitants per square mile (365.9/km^{2}). There were 1,198 housing units at an average density of 445.4 per square mile (172.0/km^{2}). The racial makeup of the city was 97.41% White, 0.24% African American, 0.24% Native American, 0.71% Asian, 0.20% from other races, and 1.22% from two or more races. Hispanic or Latino of any race were 1.37% of the population.

There were 1,107 households, out of which 28.1% had children under the age of 18 living with them, 49.9% were married couples living together, 7.5% had a female householder with no husband present, and 40.3% were non-families. 36.1% of all households were made up of individuals, and 18.5% had someone living alone who was 65 years of age or older. The average household size was 2.18 and the average family size was 2.87.

Age spread: 22.6% under the age of 18, 7.8% from 18 to 24, 26.2% from 25 to 44, 21.4% from 45 to 64, and 22.0% who were 65 years of age or older. The median age was 40 years. For every 100 females, there were 95.0 males. For every 100 females age 18 and over, there were 88.6 males.

The median income for a household in the city was $34,515, and the median income for a family was $45,128. Males had a median income of $30,246 versus $20,677 for females. The per capita income for the city was $17,937. About 6.0% of families and 9.1% of the population were below the poverty line, including 5.9% of those under age 18 and 17.5% of those age 65 or over.

== Education ==
West Union is a part of the North Fayette Valley Community School District. It was previously a part of the North Fayette Community School District, which merged into the North Fayette Valley district on July 1, 2018.

== Notable people ==
- Lucien Lester Ainsworth (1831–1902), U.S. Representative from Iowa's 3rd congressional district
- George Willis Botsford (1862–1917), classical scholar and history professor at Columbia University
- Robert B. Kamm (1919–2008), former President of Oklahoma State University–Stillwater
- Addie Dickman Miller (1859–1936), College founder and inventor
- Paul Peek (1904–1987), Associate Justice of the California Supreme Court
