= Jackson Township, Winneshiek County, Iowa =

Township in Winneshiek County, Iowa, U.S.

Coordinates: 43.126°N 92.022°W

Jackson Township is a township in Winneshiek County, Iowa, USA.

== History ==
Jackson Township was established in 1882.
