= Turkey Valley Community School District =

Public school district in Jackson Junction, Iowa, United States

Location
- Jackson Junction Winneshiek, Chickasaw, Fayette, and Howard counties United States
- Coordinates: 43.110479, -92.035223

District information
- Type: Public school district
- Grades: Pre-K to 12
- Established: 1960
- Superintendent: Jay Jurrens
- Schools: 2
- Budget: $6,404,000 (2020-21)
- NCES District ID: 1928110

Students and staff
- Students: 375 (2022-23)
- Teachers: 30.05 FTE
- Staff: 41.12 FTE
- Student–teacher ratio: 12.48
- Athletic conference: Upper Iowa Conference
- District mascot: Trojans
- Colors: Red, Black, and White

Other information
- Website: Official website

The Turkey Valley Community School District is a rural public school district headquartered in Jackson Junction, Iowa, United States, which serves grades Pre-K to 12th.

The district occupies portions of Winneshiek, Chickasaw, Fayette, and Howard counties. Municipalities in its boundary include Jackson Junction, Fort Atkinson, Lawler, Protivin, St. Lucas, and Waucoma. Unincorporated areas in the district boundaries include Little Turkey. The district has about 170 square miles (440 km^{2}) of area. In the 2012–2013 school year the enrollment was 381.

== Schools ==
The Turkey Valley Community School serves grades PreK-12. The school is located in Jackson Junction and has separate elementary and secondary sections. Features include a garden, a playground, a soccer field, a combined American football and track facility, and other ball-based sport areas. A report from the Winneshiek County government described the campus as "large" and "rural".

== Turkey Valley Junior-Senior High School ==
=== Athletics ===
The Trojans compete in the Upper Iowa Conference in the following sports:

- Cross Country
- Volleyball
- Football
- Basketball
- Wrestling
  - 2018 Class 2A Dual Team State Champions (as NHTV)
- Track and Field
  - 1987 Class 3A State Champions
- Golf
- Soccer
- Baseball
  - 1985 Class 3A State Champions (Turkey Valley)
- Softball
  - 1982 State Champions

== See also ==
- List of school districts in Iowa
- List of high schools in Iowa
