= Randalia, Iowa =

- census-designated place
- Location of Randalia, Iowa
- Coordinates: 42°51′48″N 91°53′12″W
- Country: United States
- State: Iowa
- County: Fayette

Area
  - Total: 0.19 sq mi (0.48 km^{2})
  - Land: 0.19 sq mi (0.48 km^{2})
  - Water: 0 sq mi (0.00 km^{2})
- Elevation: 1,116 ft (340 m)

Population (2020)
  - Total: 50
  - Density: 267.9/sq mi (103.44/km^{2})
- Time zone: UTC-6 (Central (CST))
  - Summer (DST): UTC-5 (CDT)
- ZIP code: 52164
- Area code: 563
- FIPS code: 19-65550
- GNIS feature ID: 2396312

Randalia is an unincorporated community and census designated place (CDP) in Fayette County, Iowa, United States. The population was 50 at the time of the 2020 census.

== History ==
Randalia was established in 1873 when a rail line was built in the community. It was named for the railroad surveying engineer, Andrew Randall, and his brothers: Josie Pitney, and Alonzo. The Randalia post office was established in 1874.

Randalia United Methodist Church was founded in 1892, with the Ladies' Aid Society of Randalia raising money for the building of a church. Groundbreaking began that year, and the building was completed on December 8, 1894, with services held the following day.

By 2007, locals in Randalia were finding their community in a state of decline. In October 2007, the city lost its post office, some time after losing its school and general store.

Randalia was officially a city until 2020, when residents voted to disincorporate.

== Geography ==
According to the United States Census Bureau, the community has a total area of 0.22 square miles (0.57 km^{2}), all land.

== Demographics ==
Historical populations
Year	Pop.	±%
1900	117	—
1910	123	+5.1%
1920	113	−8.1%
1930	123	+8.8%
1940	121	−1.6%
1950	132	+9.1%
1960	114	−13.6%
1970	85	−25.4%
1980	101	+18.8%
1990	88	−12.9%
2000	84	−4.5%
2010	68	−19.0%
2020	50	−26.5%
Source:"U.S. Census website". United States Census Bureau. and Iowa Data Center; Source: U.S. Decennial Census

=== 2020 census ===
As of the census of 2020, there were 50 people, 23 households, and 12 families residing in the community. The population density was 267.9 inhabitants per square mile (103.4/km^{2}). There were 29 housing units at an average density of 155.4 per square mile (60.0/km^{2}). The racial makeup of the community was 90.0% White, 0.0% Black or African American, 0.0% Native American, 0.9% Asian, 0.0% Pacific Islander, 0.0% from other races and 10.0% from two or more races. Hispanic or Latino persons of any race comprised 0.0% of the population.

Of the 23 households, 13.0% of which had children under the age of 18 living with them, 39.1% were married couples living together, 4.3% were cohabitating couples, 30.4% had a female householder with no spouse or partner present and 26.1% had a male householder with no spouse or partner present. 47.8% of all households were non-families. 39.1% of all households were made up of individuals, 17.4% had someone living alone who was 65 years old or older.

The median age in the community was 48.5 years. 24.0% of the residents were under the age of 20; 4.0% were between the ages of 20 and 24; 16.0% were from 25 and 44; 30.0% were from 45 and 64; and 26.0% were 65 years of age or older. The gender makeup of the community was 50.0% male and 50.0% female.

=== 2010 census ===
As of the census of 2010, there were 68 people, 29 households, and 21 families living in the community. The population density was 309.1 inhabitants per square mile (119.3/km^{2}). There were 37 housing units at an average density of 168.2 per square mile (64.9/km^{2}). The racial makeup of the city was 94.1% White and 5.9% from two or more races.

There were 29 households, of which 27.6% had children under the age of 18 living with them, 65.5% were married couples living together, 6.9% had a male householder with no wife present, and 27.6% were non-families. 27.6% of all households were made up of individuals, and 3.4% had someone living alone who was 65 years of age or older. The average household size was 2.34 and the average family size was 2.76.

The median age in the community was 41.5 years. 17.6% of residents were under the age of 18; 11.9% were between the ages of 18 and 24; 22.1% were from 25 to 44; 30.9% were from 45 to 64; and 17.6% were 65 years of age or older. The gender makeup of the city was 55.9% male and 44.1% female.

=== 2000 census ===
As of the census of 2000, there were 84 people, 32 households, and 22 families living in the community. The population density was 387.3 inhabitants per square mile (149.5/km^{2}). There were 36 housing units at an average density of 166.0 per square mile (64.1/km^{2}). The racial makeup of the community was 100.00% White.

There were 32 households, out of which 31.3% had children under the age of 18 living with them, 53.1% were married couples living together, 12.5% had a female householder with no husband present, and 31.3% were non-families. 21.9% of all households were made up of individuals, and 6.3% had someone living alone who was 65 years of age or older. The average household size was 2.63 and the average family size was 3.18.

In the community, the population was spread out, with 26.2% under the age of 18, 10.7% from 18 to 24, 26.2% from 25 to 44, 19.0% from 45 to 64, and 17.9% who were 65 years of age or older. The median age was 36 years. For every 100 females, there were 78.7 males. For every 100 females age 18 and over, there were 87.9 males.

The median income for a household in the community was $36,875, and the median income for a family was $40,625. Males had a median income of $25,625 versus $23,571 for females. The per capita income for the city was $12,018. There were 24.0% of families and 23.6% of the population living below the poverty line, including 34.6% of under eighteens and 41.7% of those over 64.

== Education ==
The West Central Community School District operates local area public schools.
