= Lawler, Iowa =

- City
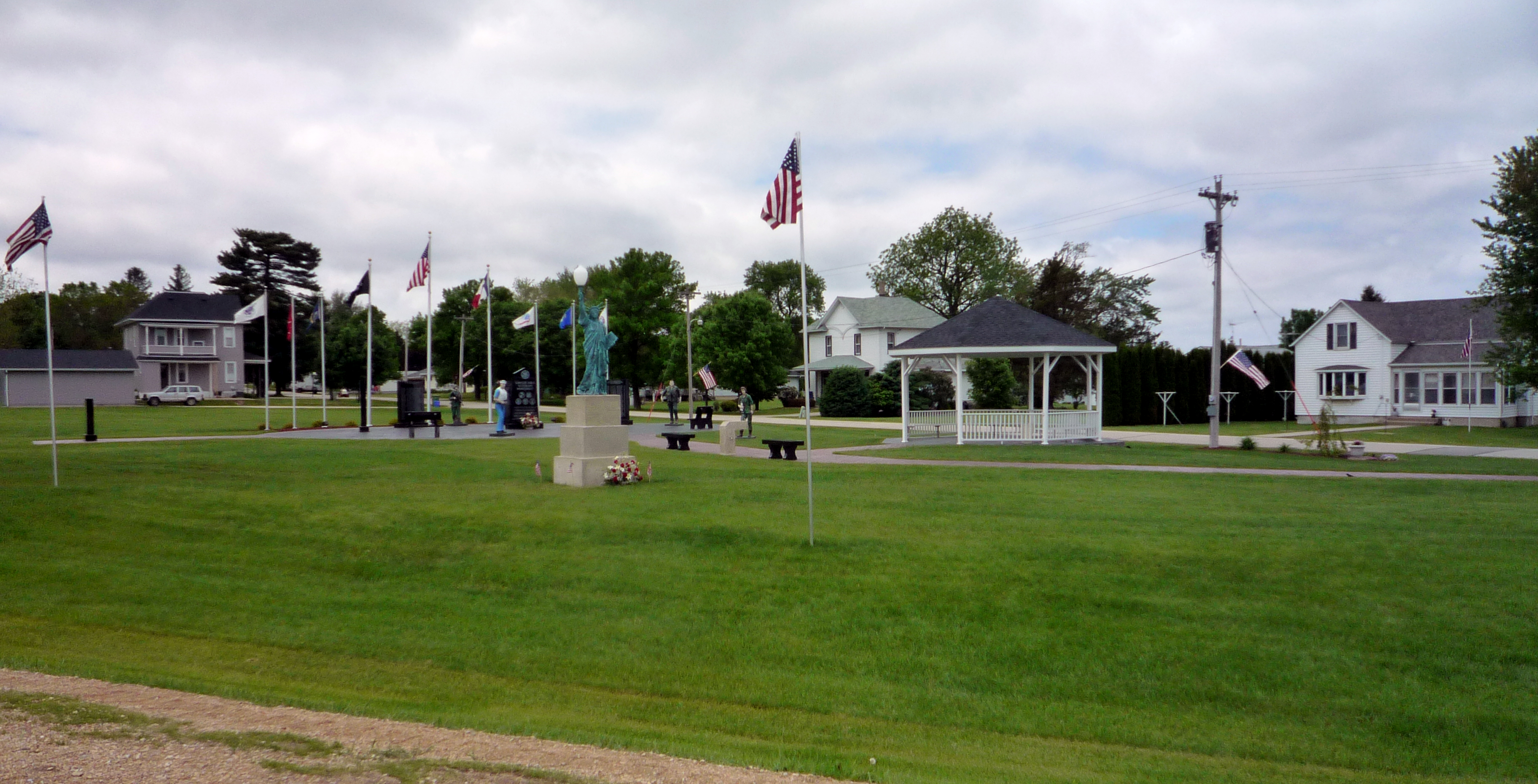
- Veterans park in Lawler

- Location of Lawler, Iowa
- Coordinates: 43°04′19″N 92°09′12″W
- Country: USA
- State: Iowa
- County: Chickasaw
- Incorporated: April 28, 1873

Area
  - Total: 0.97 sq mi (2.50 km^{2})
  - Land: 0.95 sq mi (2.47 km^{2})
  - Water: 0.012 sq mi (0.03 km^{2})
- Elevation: 1,083 ft (330 m)

Population (2020)
  - Total: 406
  - Density: 425/sq mi (164.1/km^{2})
- Time zone: UTC-6 (Central (CST))
  - Summer (DST): UTC-5 (CDT)
- ZIP code: 52154
- Area code: 563
- FIPS code: 19-43815
- GNIS feature ID: 2395646

Lawler is a city in Chickasaw County, Iowa, United States. The population was 406 at the time of the 2020 census.

== History ==
Lawler was incorporated in 1871. It is named for John Lawler, an early settler who was instrumental in bringing the railroad to the settlement.

== Geography ==
According to the United States Census Bureau, the city has a total area of 0.89 square miles (2.31 km^{2}), of which 0.88 square miles (2.28 km^{2}) is land and 0.01 square miles (0.03 km^{2}) is water.

== Demographics ==
Historical populations
Year	Pop.	±%
1880	487	—
1890	464	−4.7%
1900	646	+39.2%
1910	601	−7.0%
1920	631	+5.0%
1930	476	−24.6%
1940	542	+13.9%
1950	539	−0.6%
1960	532	−1.3%
1970	513	−3.6%
1980	534	+4.1%
1990	517	−3.2%
2000	461	−10.8%
2010	439	−4.8%
2020	406	−7.5%
Source:"U.S. Census website". United States Census Bureau. and Iowa Data Center; Source: U.S. Decennial Census

=== 2020 census ===
As of the census of 2020, there were 406 people, 202 households, and 118 families residing in the city. The population density was 428.9 inhabitants per square mile (165.6/km^{2}). There were 203 housing units at an average density of 214.4 per square mile (82.8/km^{2}). The racial makeup of the city was 91.1% White, 0.0% Black or African American, 0.7% Native American, 0.0% Asian, 0.0% Pacific Islander, 3.4% from other races and 4.7% from two or more races. Hispanic or Latino persons of any race comprised 5.4% of the population.

Of the 202 households, 25.2% of which had children under the age of 18 living with them, 39.6% were married couples living together, 9.4% were cohabitating couples, 24.8% had a female householder with no spouse or partner present and 26.2% had a male householder with no spouse or partner present. 41.6% of all households were non-families. 32.2% of all households were made up of individuals, 14.9% had someone living alone who was 65 years old or older.

The median age in the city was 42.0 years. 22.4% of the residents were under the age of 20; 6.4% were between the ages of 20 and 24; 23.2% were from 25 and 44; 25.4% were from 45 and 64; and 22.7% were 65 years of age or older. The gender makeup of the city was 52.2% male and 47.8% female.

=== 2010 census ===
As of the census of 2010, there were 439 people, 200 households, and 127 families living in the city. The population density was 498.9 inhabitants per square mile (192.6/km^{2}). There were 214 housing units at an average density of 243.2 per square mile (93.9/km^{2}). The racial makeup of the city was 92.7% White, 0.2% African American, 6.8% from other races, and 0.2% from two or more races. Hispanic or Latino of any race were 8.9% of the population.

There were 200 households, of which 24.5% had children under the age of 18 living with them, 52.0% were married couples living together, 8.5% had a female householder with no husband present, 3.0% had a male householder with no wife present, and 36.5% were non-families. 33.5% of all households were made up of individuals, and 18% had someone living alone who was 65 years of age or older. The average household size was 2.20 and the average family size was 2.77.

The median age in the city was 44.3 years. 20.5% of residents were under the age of 18; 8.5% were between the ages of 18 and 24; 21.9% were from 25 to 44; 27.4% were from 45 to 64; and 21.9% were 65 years of age or older. The gender makeup of the city was 49.0% male and 51.0% female.

=== 2000 census ===
As of the census of 2000, there were 461 people, 202 households, and 134 families living in the city. The population density was 517.1 inhabitants per square mile (199.7/km^{2}). There were 217 housing units at an average density of 243.4 per square mile (94.0/km^{2}). The racial makeup of the city was 99.13% White, and 0.87% from two or more races. Hispanic or Latino of any race were 0.65% of the population.

There were 202 households, out of which 24.8% had children under the age of 18 living with them, 57.4% were married couples living together, 6.9% had a female householder with no husband present, and 33.2% were non-families. 31.7% of all households were made up of individuals, and 17.8% had someone living alone who was 65 years of age or older. The average household size was 2.28 and the average family size was 2.83.

Age spread: 23.6% under the age of 18, 6.7% from 18 to 24, 22.6% from 25 to 44, 25.2% from 45 to 64, and 21.9% who were 65 years of age or older. The median age was 44 years. For every 100 females, there were 92.1 males. For every 100 females age 18 and over, there were 87.2 males.

The median income for a household in the city was $30,500, and the median income for a family was $36,875. Males had a median income of $31,429 versus $21,029 for females. The per capita income for the city was $21,268. About 10.5% of families and 16.3% of the population were below the poverty line, including 23.3% of those under age 18 and 19.0% of those age 65 or over.

== Education ==
The municipality is within the Turkey Valley Community School District.
