= Protivin, Iowa =

- City
- Location of Protivin, Iowa
- Coordinates: 43°13′00″N 92°05′20″W
- Country: United States
- State: Iowa
- Counties: Chickasaw, Howard

Area
  - Total: 0.44 sq mi (1.14 km^{2})
  - Land: 0.44 sq mi (1.14 km^{2})
  - Water: 0 sq mi (0.00 km^{2})
- Elevation: 1,152 ft (351 m)

Population (2020)
  - Total: 269
  - Density: 611.8/sq mi (236.21/km^{2})
- Time zone: UTC-6 (Central (CST))
  - Summer (DST): UTC-5 (CDT)
- ZIP code: 52163
- Area code: 563
- FIPS code: 19-65010
- GNIS feature ID: 2396290
- Website: www.cityofprotivin.com

Protivin is a city in Chickasaw and Howard counties in the U.S. state of Iowa. The population was 269 at the time of the 2020 census. Early settlers named the city after the Bohemian town of Protivín in what is now the south of the Czech Republic.

== History ==
The first Czech settlers arrived around 1855 and established themselves because the landscape reminded them of their home region. The community was and is predominately Catholic and they built their own church in 1878 which was the town's first structure.

Protivin was platted in 1878, and incorporated as a town in 1894.

== Town life ==
Protivin holds an annual weekend festival known as Czech Days each August where the town's Czech heritage is celebrated. The event draws people from throughout Howard and Chickasaw counties.

The Roman Catholic Holy Trinity Church is the town's only church and only school. The school is a private school called Trinity Catholic School.

== Geography ==
The Protivin area has many wildlife areas and opportunities for hunting and fishing. According to the United States Census Bureau, the city has a total area of 0.48 square miles (1.24 km^{2}), all land.

Taylor's Pond is located a few miles northwest of Protivin and has a four-acre pond used for fishing as well as picnic facilities.

Protivin is located on a state highway between U.S. Routes 52 and 63.

== Demographics ==
Historical populations
Year	Pop.	±%
1900	136	—
1910	163	+19.9%
1920	201	+23.3%
1930	277	+37.8%
1940	290	+4.7%
1950	283	−2.4%
1960	302	+6.7%
1970	333	+10.3%
1980	368	+10.5%
1990	305	−17.1%
2000	317	+3.9%
2010	283	−10.7%
2020	269	−4.9%
Source:"U.S. Census website". United States Census Bureau. and Iowa Data Center; Source: U.S. Decennial Census

=== 2020 census ===
As of the census of 2020, there were 269 people, 140 households, and 76 families residing in the city. The population density was 611.8 inhabitants per square mile (236.2/km^{2}). There were 150 housing units at an average density of 341.1 per square mile (131.7/km^{2}). The racial makeup of the city was 88.5% White, 0.0% Black or African American, 1.5% Native American, 0.0% Asian, 0.0% Pacific Islander, 7.1% from other races and 3.0% from two or more races. Hispanic or Latino persons of any race comprised 8.6% of the population.

Of the 140 households, 25.7% of which had children under the age of 18 living with them, 41.4% were married couples living together, 12.9% were cohabitating couples, 20.7% had a female householder with no spouse or partner present and 25.0% had a male householder with no spouse or partner present. 45.7% of all households were non-families. 38.6% of all households were made up of individuals, 15.0% had someone living alone who was 65 years old or older.

The median age in the city was 41.8 years. 21.6% of the residents were under the age of 20; 1.5% were between the ages of 20 and 24; 29.7% were from 25 and 44; 24.2% were from 45 and 64; and 23.0% were 65 years of age or older. The gender makeup of the city was 52.4% male and 47.6% female.

=== 2010 census ===
As of the census of 2010, there were 283 people, 143 households, and 79 families living in the city. The population density was 589.6 inhabitants per square mile (227.6/km^{2}). There were 167 housing units at an average density of 347.9 per square mile (134.3/km^{2}). The racial makeup of the city was 99.3% White, 0.4% Asian, and 0.4% from other races. Hispanic or Latino of any race were 0.7% of the population.

There were 143 households, of which 20.3% had children under the age of 18 living with them, 42.7% were married couples living together, 7.7% had a female householder with no husband present, 4.9% had a male householder with no wife present, and 44.8% were non-families. 39.9% of all households were made up of individuals, and 23.1% had someone living alone who was 65 years of age or older. The average household size was 1.98 and the average family size was 2.53.

The median age in the city was 48.6 years. 18% of residents were under the age of 18; 7.8% were between the ages of 18 and 24; 20.5% were from 25 to 44; 29.7% were from 45 to 64; and 24% were 65 years of age or older. The gender makeup of the city was 48.8% male and 51.2% female.

=== 2000 census ===
As of the census of 2000, there were 317 people, 154 households, and 79 families living in the city. The population density was 663.5 inhabitants per square mile (256.2/km^{2}). There were 180 housing units at an average density of 376.8 per square mile (145.5/km^{2}). The racial makeup of the city is 99.68% White and 0.32% Asian.

There were 154 households, out of which 20.8% had children under the age of 18 living with them, 43.5% were married couples living together, 4.5% had a female householder with no husband present, and 48.7% were non-families. 43.5% of all households were made up of individuals, and 29.2% had someone living alone who was 65 years of age or older. The average household size was 2.06 and the average family size was 2.86.

In the city, the population was spread out, with 21.8% under the age of 18, 5.7% from 18 to 24, 23.0% from 25 to 44, 20.5% from 45 to 64, and 29.0% who were 65 years of age or older. The median age was 44 years. For every 100 females, there were 108.6 males. For every 100 females age 18 and over, there were 98.4 males.

The median income for a household in the city was $29,779, and the median income for a family was $35,156. Males had a median income of $30,179 versus $18,125 for females. The per capita income for the city was $18,818. About 10.1% of families and 13.2% of the population were below the poverty line, including 15.3% of those under the age of 18 and 20.7% of those ages 65 and older.

== Education ==
The municipality is within the Turkey Valley Community School District. The district's school is in Jackson Junction.

Trinity Catholic School, of the Roman Catholic Archdiocese of Dubuque, is located in Protivin.
