= Waucoma, Iowa =

- City
- Location of Waucoma, Iowa
- Coordinates: 43°03′20″N 92°02′04″W
- Country: United States
- State: Iowa
- County: Fayette

Area
  - Total: 0.47 sq mi (1.21 km^{2})
  - Land: 0.47 sq mi (1.21 km^{2})
  - Water: 0 sq mi (0.00 km^{2})
- Elevation: 1,043 ft (318 m)

Population (2020)
  - Total: 229
  - Density: 489.7/sq mi (189.06/km^{2})
- Time zone: UTC-6 (Central (CST))
  - Summer (DST): UTC-5 (CDT)
- ZIP code: 52171
- Area code: 563
- FIPS code: 19-82650
- GNIS feature ID: 2397220

Waucoma is a city in Fayette County, Iowa, United States. The population was 229 at the time of the 2020 census.

== Geography ==
Waucoma is located on the Little Turkey River.

According to the United States Census Bureau, the city has a total area of 0.43 square miles (1.11 km^{2}), all land.

== History ==
Waucoma Twilight: Generations of the Farm, by Dona Schwartz, is a 1992 publication of the Smithsonian Institution Press, which studies the rise and decline of Waucoma.

== Demographics ==
Historical populations
Year	Pop.	±%
1880	225	—
1890	406	+80.4%
1900	540	+33.0%
1910	433	−19.8%
1920	457	+5.5%
1930	425	−7.0%
1940	430	+1.2%
1950	385	−10.5%
1960	364	−5.5%
1970	357	−1.9%
1980	308	−13.7%
1990	277	−10.1%
2000	299	+7.9%
2010	257	−14.0%
2020	229	−10.9%
Source:"U.S. Census website". United States Census Bureau. and Iowa Data Center; Source: U.S. Decennial Census

=== 2020 census ===
As of the census of 2020, there were 229 people, 116 households, and 71 families residing in the city. The population density was 489.7 inhabitants per square mile (189.1/km^{2}). There were 123 housing units at an average density of 263.0 per square mile (101.5/km^{2}). The racial makeup of the city was 96.9% White, 0.4% Black or African American, 0.0% Native American, 0.0% Asian, 0.0% Pacific Islander, 0.9% from other races and 1.7% from two or more races. Hispanic or Latino persons of any race comprised 0.9% of the population.

Of the 116 households, 27.6% of which had children under the age of 18 living with them, 42.2% were married couples living together, 5.2% were cohabitating couples, 31.0% had a female householder with no spouse or partner present and 21.6% had a male householder with no spouse or partner present. 38.8% of all households were non-families. 35.3% of all households were made up of individuals, 13.8% had someone living alone who was 65 years old or older.

The median age in the city was 43.5 years. 21.0% of the residents were under the age of 20; 3.9% were between the ages of 20 and 24; 26.2% were from 25 and 44; 27.9% were from 45 and 64; and 21.0% were 65 years of age or older. The gender makeup of the city was 53.3% male and 46.7% female.

=== 2010 census ===
As of the census of 2010, there were 257 people, 122 households, and 75 families living in the city. The population density was 597.7 inhabitants per square mile (230.8/km^{2}). There were 134 housing units at an average density of 311.6 per square mile (120.3/km^{2}). The racial makeup of the city was 98.1% White, 0.4% Asian, and 1.6% from two or more races. Hispanic or Latino of any race were 0.4% of the population.

There were 122 households, of which 24.6% had children under the age of 18 living with them, 49.2% were married couples living together, 8.2% had a female householder with no husband present, 4.1% had a male householder with no wife present, and 38.5% were non-families. 33.6% of all households were made up of individuals, and 14.8% had someone living alone who was 65 years of age or older. The average household size was 2.11 and the average family size was 2.67.

The median age in the city was 47.8 years. 19.8% of residents were under the age of 18; 8.5% were between the ages of 18 and 24; 19.4% were from 25 to 44; 29.5% were from 45 to 64; and 22.6% were 65 years of age or older. The gender makeup of the city was 49.8% male and 50.2% female.

=== 2000 census ===
As of the census of 2000, there were 299 people, 138 households, and 76 families living in the city. The population density was 693.8 inhabitants per square mile (267.9/km^{2}). There were 151 housing units at an average density of 350.4 per square mile (135.3/km^{2}). The racial makeup of the city was 99.33% White, 0.67% from other races. Hispanic or Latino of any race were 0.67% of the population.

There were 138 households, out of which 23.9% had children under the age of 18 living with them, 50.0% were married couples living together, 4.3% had a female householder with no husband present, and 44.9% were non-families. 39.1% of all households were made up of individuals, and 21.7% had someone living alone who was 65 years of age or older. The average household size was 2.17 and the average family size was 2.97.

In the city, the population was spread out, with 22.7% under the age of 18, 7.4% from 18 to 24, 24.7% from 25 to 44, 24.4% from 45 to 64, and 20.7% who were 65 years of age or older. The median age was 42 years. For every 100 females, there were 92.9 males. For every 100 females age 18 and over, there were 87.8 males.

The median income for a household in the city was $22,500, and the median income for a family was $33,250. Males had a median income of $22,125 versus $20,417 for females. The per capita income for the city was $14,323. About 5.5% of families and 15.5% of the population were below the poverty line, including none of those under the age of eighteen and 28.6% of those 65 or over.

== Education ==
The municipality is within the Turkey Valley Community School District.
