= U.S. Route 63 in Iowa =

U.S. Highway in Iowa

U.S. Highway 63
- US 63 highlighted in red

Route information
- Maintained by Iowa DOT
- Length: 237.758 mi (382.634 km)
- Existed: July 1, 1926–present

Major junctions
- South end: US 63 near Bloomfield
- US 34 in Ottumwa; I-80 near Malcom; US 6 near Malcom; US 30 at Toledo; US 20 at Waterloo; US 218 at Waterloo; US 18 at New Hampton
- North end: US 63 at Chester

Location
- Country: United States
- State: Iowa
- Counties: Davis; Wapello; Mahaska; Poweshiek; Tama; Black Hawk; Bremer; Chickasaw; Howard

Highway system
- United States Numbered Highway System; List; Special; Divided; Iowa Primary Highway System; Interstate; US; State; Secondary; Scenic
← Iowa 62	→ Iowa 64

U.S. Highway 63 (US 63) is a United States Highway that runs through the eastern third of Iowa. It begins at the Missouri state line southwest of Bloomfield and travels north through Ottumwa, Oskaloosa, Tama, Waterloo, and New Hampton. It ends at the Minnesota state line at Chester. Between Ottumwa and Oskaloosa, the highway is a four-lane controlled-access highway. Through Waterloo and New Hampton, it is partially controlled; that is, the road as both grade-separated interchanges and at-grade intersections. The rest of the highway is largely a two-lane rural highway.

While US 63 was created in 1926, it dates back eleven years prior to the creation of the Daniel Boone Trail, which sought to be the best north–south highway in an era when most routes traveled from east to west. Through Iowa, it traveled through Ottumwa, Oskaloosa, Prairie City, Des Moines, Boone, and Algona. Upon creation of the primary highway system in 1920, the Daniel Boone Trail was assigned a series of route numbers. When the U.S. Highway System was created in 1926, US 63 was assigned to the path that had been the Daniel Boone Trail, but only from the Missouri state line to the state capitol in Des Moines. 1934 brought major changes to the U.S. Highway System as a whole and US 63 had a major realignment. Instead of turning to the northwest at Oskaloosa, it now traveled north through Tama, Waterloo, and New Hampton, eventually reaching Lake Superior at Ashland, Wisconsin.

Since then, the routing of US 63 has served the same communities, but the route has been adjusted as new highway projects have been completed. Significant infrastructure projects in Ottumwa and Waterloo in the 1950s through the 1970s updated the roadway to modern standards. In the 1990s and 2000s, large parts of the US 63 corridor found itself removed from planning budgets while other portions of the route were widened to four lanes. Portions of a Des Moines-to-Burlington corridor that included US 63 were widened to four lanes in the 1990s through the mid-2000s. Through Waterloo, all of US 63 north of the Cedar River was rebuilt in the 2010s. It was expected that the renewed highway would be a catalyst for economic growth in the area.

== Route description ==
US 63 enters the state in Davis County north of Lancaster, Missouri. It heads north for about eleven miles (18 km) until it reaches Iowa 2. The route turns east onto Iowa 2 and the two highways travel together until Bloomfield. There, Iowa 2 continues east and US 63 turns north and travels through the town. North of Bloomfield, the highway does not pass through another community for the next 20 miles (32 km) when it arrives in Ottumwa. At a roundabout on the southeast side of town, it meets US 34. The first of two business routes splits away from the main route and follows westbound US 34 while eastbound US 34 joins US 63. The two highways cross the Des Moines River and curve around the downtown area of Ottumwa until they reach Iowa 163. Here, at a sweeping curve, US 34 follows Iowa 163 east and US 63 heads north. The freeway bypasses Ottumwa to the east and then curves around to the north; a couple interchanges serve local traffic. At the Iowa 149 interchange, the US 63 business route rejoins the mainline highway.

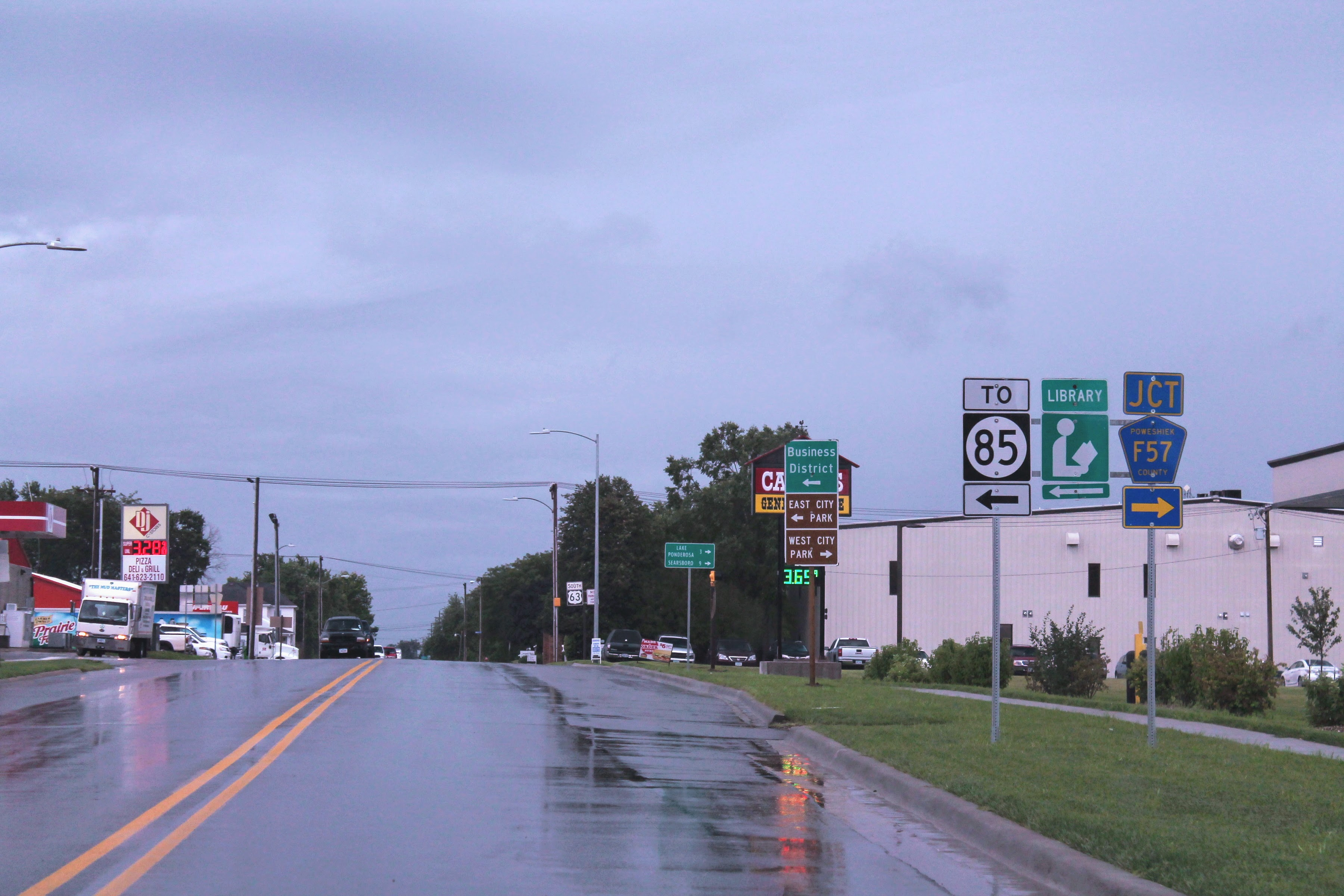
US 63 in Montezuma

After continuing west for a few miles, US 63 and Iowa 163 turn to the northwest near Chillicothe to follow the course of the Des Moines River. At Eddyville, they meet Iowa 137 on the south side of the town. Another exit on the north end serves Eddyville Raceway Park. North of Eddyville, they head north for six miles (9.7 km) until they reach exit 60 where Iowa 163 continues along the four-lane road and US 63 exits to the north. Coincidentally, this interchange is numbered exit 60 in both directions; it is about 60 miles (97 km) from Iowa 163's western end in Des Moines as well as US 63's southern end. US 63 enters Oskaloosa and meets Iowa Highway 92 in the downtown area. As it leaves Oskaloosa, it passes the campus of William Penn University. It continues north and reaches the town of New Sharon. In this town's downtown area, the highway turns east at the intersection of Main and Market streets. Iowa 146 begins its northward trek at the intersection and from 1980 to 2003, Iowa 102 followed West Market Street toward Pella. When Iowa 102 was turned back in May 2003, the City of New Sharon did not enter into a transfer of jurisdiction agreement with the Iowa Department of Transportation for its portion of the highway, thus the state still maintains the one-half mile (800 m) of Iowa 102 in the city.

US 63 heads east for a few miles before turning back to the north to head towards Montezuma. There, it skirts the downtown area to the west. Prior to the mid-1990s, it met Iowa 85 at an intersection with Main Street; that highway was turned back to the eastern city limits in 1994. Just south of Malcom, US 63 comes to an interchange with I-80. The crosses a line of the Iowa Interstate Railroad and passes through the community. The highway comes to a T-intersection with US 6 between Grinnell and Brooklyn. The two roads overlap each other for two miles (3.2 km) before US 63 splits off to the north. It heads north for about fifteen miles (24 km), crosses the Iowa River and enters Tama. In Tama, it passes through the downtown area where it intersects the Lincoln Highway Heritage Byway. Farther north it meets the byway again before entering Tama's sister city, Toledo. There it has an interchange with the current routing of US 30 and an intersection with the previous routing, now signed as a business route of US 30.

North of Tama–Toledo, the highway passes through rural Tama County. It meets Iowa 96, which heads west toward Gladbrook at a T-intersection. US 63 turns east for a few miles and then turns north into Traer. There it meets the western end of Iowa 8. Continuing north, the highway passes Buckingham to the west and then intersects Iowa 175 not long after crossing into Black Hawk County. At Hudson, it meets Iowa 58 before turning to the northeast. Shortly before the US 20 interchange, the roadway widens to a four-lane divided highway. Known as Sergeant Road through southwestern Waterloo, the highway follows the course of Black Hawk Creek, which flows to the west of the road. At University Avenue, US 63 curves around to meet it at a right angle. Lying just yards from this intersection is an interchange with US 218. US 63 and US 218 do not overlap each other; US 63 splits into a one-way couplet and each direction surrounds the US 218 freeway. Northeast of US 218, US 63 remains as one-way streets. The northbound lanes use 1st Avenue and the southbound lanes use Mullan Avenue. At the Cedar River, Young Arena lies between the two streets.

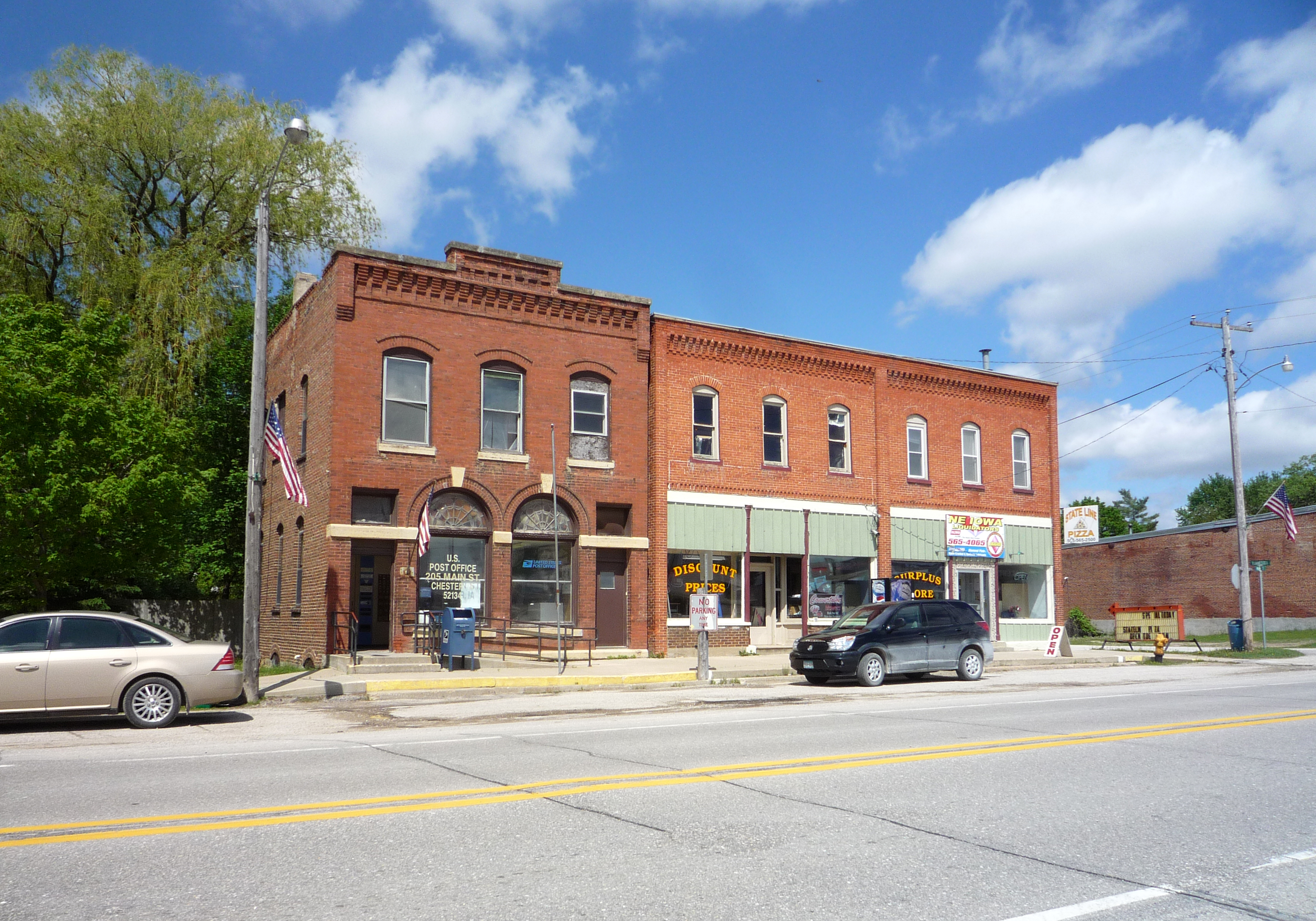
Downtown Chester near the Minnesota state line

North of Franklin Street, the two directions rejoin and form Logan Avenue. The road travels on a viaduct over railroad tracks owned by Canadian National that opened on November 1, 2019. Previously, the roadway went underneath the railroad tracks, but the underpass was prone to flooding. The road continues through northern Waterloo as a five-lane road, two travel lanes in each direction and a central turning lane. A few miles north of the city limits, the turning lane ends and the road becomes a divided highway. At Denver, an interchange serves the community as the highway curves around it to the west. A short distance later is another interchange with Iowa 3. The four-lane highway continues north where it meets Iowa 93 and Iowa 188 in short succession. About six miles (9.7 km) north of Frederika lies an interchange with US 18 and Iowa 346. US 18 turns onto the US 63 expressway and they head north toward New Hampton.

Just south of New Hampton is an exit for the second of US 63's business routes. At another interchange near the city center, US 18 exits and heads west; Iowa 24 heads east. The four-lane road curves along the north side of town and meets the northern end of the business route. As the road curves back to the north, the divided highway ends and it becomes a two-lane road for the remainder of its trip through Iowa. It travels through rural Chickasaw and Howard counties until it reaches Iowa 9 roughly midway between Riceville and Cresco. It skirts to the west of Lime Springs and then turns to the northwest. The road passes through Chester, which is the last Iowa community along the route. It crosses the Upper Iowa River and enters Minnesota three-quarters mile (1,200 m) later. The roadway continues toward Rochester.

== History ==
What is now the US 63 corridor has been used, under various names, for over 100 years. The route was first organized as the Daniel Boone Trail in 1915 during the height of the Good Roads Movement. Then, the road was maintained by the Daniel Boone Trail Association, which solicited donations from people who lived along the route. Five years later, the Iowa General Assembly passed a primary road bill which shifted the responsibility of road maintenance from associations to Iowa's 99 counties. At the same time, route numbers were applied to the new primary highway system; the Daniel Boone Trail was designated several route numbers. In 1925, confusion between route associations and nascent state highway systems led to the creation of the U.S. Highway System. U.S. Highway 63 was realized the next year.

A road study organized in 1958 identified roads that should be expanded to four lanes by 1980. The study listed all of Iowa 163 and US 63 from Oskaloosa to Bloomfield. An updated report in 1968 called for two freeways along US 63, one from Des Moines to Burlington that also used Iowa 163 and another from Waterloo to New Hampton, and widening the road to four lanes from Ottumwa south to the Missouri state line and from New Hampton north to Minnesota. Major infrastructure projects were undertaken in Ottumwa in the 1950s and 1960s. In the Waterloo area, there were projects in response to growing traffic needs in the 1960s that carried over into the 1970s. Forty years later, these areas once again modernized their roadways.

=== Daniel Boone Trail ===
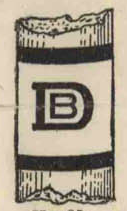
Daniel Boone Trail
- Location: St. Louis, Mo.–St. Paul, Minn via Ottumwa, Des Moines, and Fort Dodge
- Length: 566 mi (911 km)
- Existed: 1915–1927

Spearheaded by former state representative J.B. McHose of Boone, the Daniel Boone Trail Association was created with the idea of creating the pre-eminent north–south highway in the country at the time. McHose met with chambers of commerce in cities along the proposed route in order to drum up interest. The route was intended to travel from St. Louis, Missouri, to St. Paul, Minnesota, by way of Ottumwa, Oskaloosa, Des Moines, Boone, Fort Dodge, Humboldt, and Algona. Through southern Iowa, it was not immediately known where the trail would be located. Meetings in early 1916 clarified that the route between Des Moines and Oskaloosa would follow the northern bank of the Des Moines River and pass through Pella and Prairie City. An alternate route had been proposed through Knoxville and Albia south of the river.

Before numbered highways and road maps became the norm for wayfinding, blue books were an important way for the traveling public to get from place to place. In 1916, then the president of the Daniel Boone Trail Association, McHose accompanied a pathfinder writing for a blue book from Boone to Ottumwa, ensuring the Daniel Boone Trail was recorded correctly for the next edition. At the same time, route markers were being placed along the route. The signs measured 10 by 30 inches (250 by 760 mm) and said "Daniel Boone trail, Canada to the gulf."

=== Primary roads ===
In 1919, the Iowa General Assembly passed a bill that created a fund for improving and hard-surfacing nearly 6,300 miles (10,100 km) of primary roads in the state. The primary road system was to connect every city and town with at least 1000 inhabitants. The bill gave Iowa's 99 counties the responsibility for maintaining the roads, which had previously fallen upon road associations that sponsored their respective highways. The new primary roads were assigned route numbers, a trend seen in other Midwestern states. Route numbers were painted onto telegraph and telephone poles in order to guide travelers without the need for maps. Because of the snaking route the Daniel Boone Trail took through the state, it was assigned multiple route numbers: Primary Road No. 13 from the Missouri state line to No. 24 near Hedrick, thence on No. 24 to Oskaloosa, No. 2 from Oskaloosa to Des Moines, No. 60 from Des Moines to Boone, No. 6 from Boone to Ogden, No. 90 from Ogden to Harcourt, and lastly No. 16 from Harcourt to the Minnesota state line.

=== U.S. Highways ===
Iowa US 63 shield

In the mid-1920s, automobile associations continued to sponsor their named routes — there were 64 such named routes in Iowa — on top of the route numbers given by the state highway commission. This proved to be more confusing than helpful to the casual traveler, so in 1924, the American Association of State Highway Officials (AASHO, later AASHTO) called for a national system of interstate highways. Of the 75,884 miles (122,123 km) proposed by AASHO, nearly 3,000 miles (4,800 km) were allocated to Iowa. Across the country, support for the system was nearly unanimous among state highway officials and the new national routings and route numbers were assigned in 1925. The Iowa State Highway Commission chose to renumber a few highways as to not have conflicting route numbers along important routes. U.S. Highway 63 was designated along Primary Roads No. 13, 24, and 2, which was the Daniel Boone Trail from Missouri to Des Moines. Once the U.S. Highway System was established, the automobile association-sponsored roads gradually disappeared.

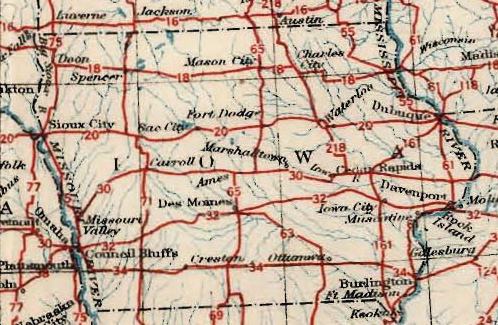
A map of Iowa's U.S. Highways as laid out in 1926

The new US 63 entered Iowa near Bloomfield and traveled north through Ottumwa to Oskaloosa. There it turned to the northwest to go through Pella, Monroe, and Prairie City. The national northern end of the highway was at the corner of Grand Avenue and E. 14th Street near the Iowa State Capitol where US 32 and US 65 split. When it was designated, only a small percentage of the route was paved – a short section south of Oskaloosa and all it in Polk County. By August 1934, the whole route was paved.

U.S. Highway 163
- Location: Des Moines–Oskaloosa
- Length: 60 mi (97 km)
- Existed: 1934–1937

In 1933, residents of southeastern Minnesota expressed interest to the state highway department for an extension of US 63 from Iowa through Minnesota and to Lake Superior in Wisconsin. Around the same, AASHO was conducting a review of the young U.S. Highway System. In other states, some U.S. Highways split into two routes, e.g. US 70N and US 70S; these splits were found to not be particularly useful for the traveling public and AASHO recommended their removal.

At AASHO's annual meeting in 1934, among the topics discussed was the highway system itself. Attendees decreed that the system should serve interstate traffic and that shorter routes that do not serve that purpose should be consolidated into other highways or removed from the system entirely. Additionally, any new routes in the system would only be approved in areas that were unoccupied by any other routes. At that same meeting, US 63 away from Des Moines and instead north from Oskaloosa over Iowa 59. This created a route from Turrell, Arkansas, to Ashland, Wisconsin, by way of Waterloo, Rochester, Minnesota, and Red Wing, Minnesota. Due to the major change in the route, the abandoned segment from Oskaloosa to Des Moines was renumbered U.S. Highway 163. The newly numbered US 163 did not last long. In 1937, AASHO changed its policies with regards to numbered highways entirely within one state. As a result, Iowa 163 replaced US 163 in its entirety; US 161 in eastern Iowa was also affected. When it became US 63, the former Iowa 59 was nearly fully paved. Only the portion of the route in Poweshiek County south of US 6 was a gravel road. That section was paved in 1938.

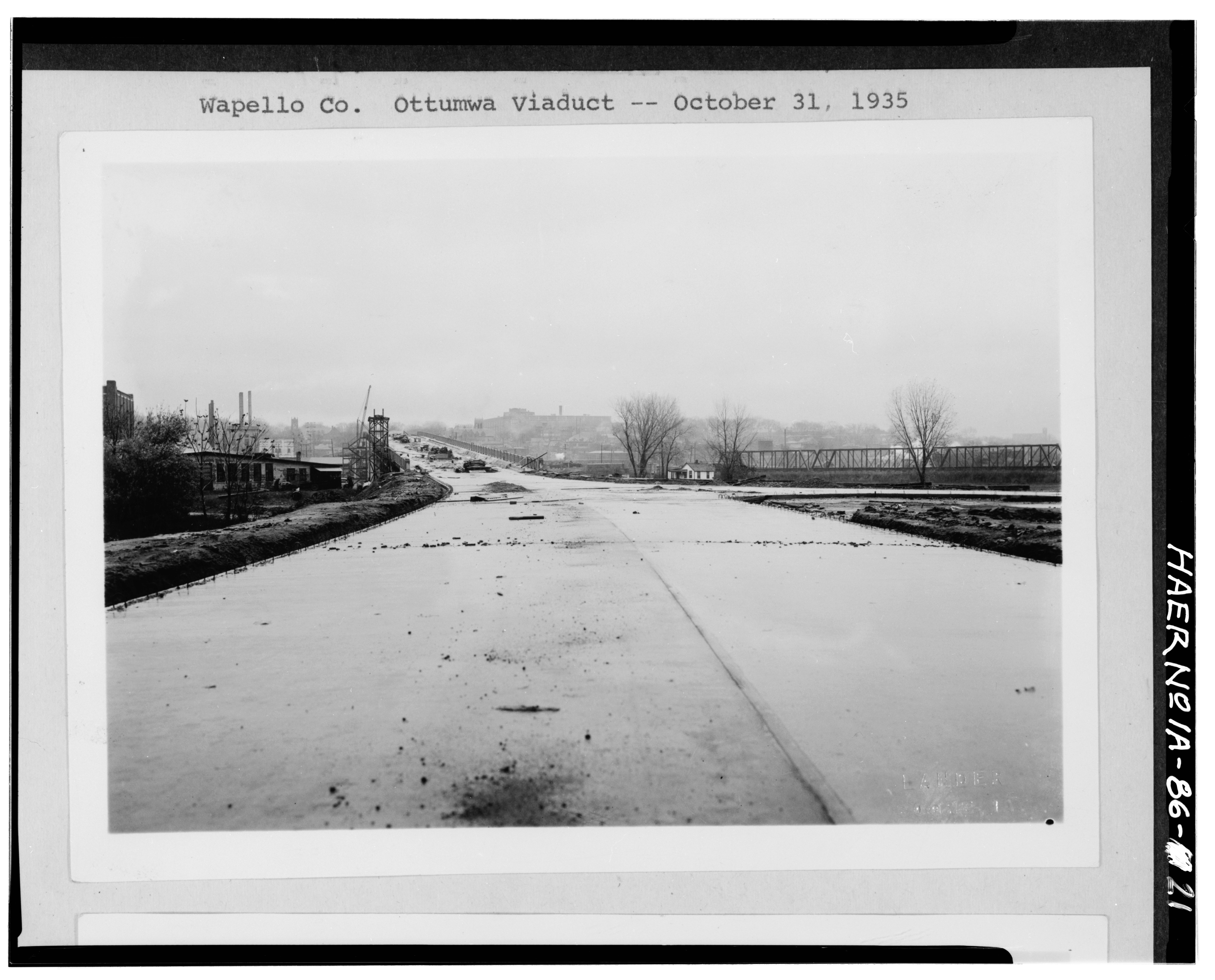
The Jefferson Street bridge while under construction in 1935

After two floods inundated Ottumwa in 1947, the city created an ambitious public works project that began in 1955. The main part of the project was the straightening and widening of the Des Moines River through the city. The main channel of the river was an oxbow that curved into the southern half of the city; a smaller channel bordered the northern half. The smaller northern channel was to be widened to accommodate the full river. Dirt excavated for the new channel was to be used to build levees and to provide fill dirt for the relocation of US 63 and US 34. US 63 entered Ottumwa from the south along Madison Street and met US 34 at the foot of the river. They then crossed on the Jefferson Street bridge; US 34 split away at the intersection with Main Street. US 63 continued north on Jefferson but turned west on Vanness Street for a block before turning north on Court Street and out of town. The new routing of US 63 followed the bank of the Des Moines river more closely. It intersected US 34 near the John Deere plant and followed the new river bank. US 63 turned north onto the new Wapello Street viaduct, passed over downtown, and then north along a new four-lane road that connected to Court Street. The $2-million viaduct was the last piece of the $22-million project (equivalent to $15.4 million and $170 million, respectively, in 2024 dollars) that lasted ten years.

=== Growing pains in Waterloo ===
In the late 1950s, an editorial published in the Waterloo Daily Courier called for the Iowa State Highway Commission to widen the highways in the Waterloo area. It cited a statistic that suggested a highway with over daily traffic of over 4000 vehicles should be expanded to four lanes. On US 63, the highway commission's count in 1956 found that 4430 vehicles north of Waterloo and 2490 vehicles south of the city used the highway daily. Traffic on US 63 had nearly doubled since the previous count in 1954. Traffic entered Waterloo from the southwest on a winding road that became 4th Street. At Washington Street, which carried US 218, the highway split into a one-way couplet between Washington and Franklin streets. Northbound traffic used 5th Street and southbound traffic Park Avenue; both streets traveled over the Cedar River and passed through downtown Waterloo. At Franklin, which carried US 20, the two directions of US 63 and they followed Franklin for a few blocks before turning north onto Logan Avenue. At the intersection with Center Street, there was a level crossing with the Illinois Central Railroad.

Two years later, the commission announced $8 million in highway projects (equivalent to $65.7 million in 2024 dollars) in the Waterloo area, among which was relocating US 63 on the west side of Waterloo, a shifted Cedar River crossing, and a rail crossing north of downtown. In 1960, it was announced that the rerouted path of US 63 in western Waterloo would run adjacent to the Chicago Great Western railroad tracks that ran along Black Hawk Creek. It would then meet US 218 near the John Deere plant and then use Mullan Avenue and a new bridge at 1st Street across the Cedar River to US 20. North of US 20, an underpass would be constructed to eliminate the Illinois Central crossing. The new underpass opened with great fanfare on October 31, 1963, as it brought relief from a bottlenecks brought on by the nearby rail yard. A pedestrian bridge over US 63 was built as well.

Parts of the western Waterloo route opened in 1962. It was opened up from Hudson to San Marnan Drive, which was Iowa 412. The rest of the western Waterloo highway was delayed by the city so the Army Corps of Engineers could complete a study on flood control in the downtown area. It was not known if the heights of any potential new levees would require a new Mullan Avenue bridge. The new section of highway from Hudson featured a 90-degree turn, a temporary stopgap measure until the rest of the highway could be built to US 218. Inadequate signage notifying drivers of an abrupt speed limit change from 70 to 25 miles per hour (115 to 40 km/h) led to numerous accidents where drivers did not handle the turn correctly. The connection to US 218 opened on December 16, 1968.

A new bridge over the Cedar River opened in June 1968, but northbound US 63 traffic was not rerouted onto the new span right away. Traffic lights and street lights were not yet installed along the bridge and widened First Street. Southbound US 63 was using the Mullan Avenue shortly after the First Street bridge opened. The Waterloo City Council voted in March 1969 to replace the Mullan Avenue bridge with a new span. The old bridge was built in 1913, but it was determined to be in worse condition than originally believed. The Mullan Avenue bridge closed on February 16, 1970, and southbound US 63 traffic was detoured to 5th Street; by then northbound US 63 traffic had been using the First Street bridge. A month later, while using a wrecking ball on one of the support arches, the rest of bridge collapsed into the Cedar River. A small tractor and large air compressor fell into the water with the bridge. The new Mullan Avenue bridge opened on November 23, 1970.

The 1980s and 1990s were a busy time for road construction in the Waterloo–Cedar Falls metro area. Waterloo mayor Leo P. Rooff in the 1970s declined extending I-380 to Cedar Falls by using the Federal Highway Administration's interstate substitution program; money that was earmarked for interstate highway construction could be used for other projects. Rooff wanted the money to be used for existing infrastructure, which was not in good condition. Some of the money saved was used to build the Iowa 58 expressway in Cedar Falls and the US 218 expressway connecting the two cities. US 20 was rerouted onto a freeway south of Iowa 412 in 1983; the interchange between US 20 and US 63 was built overtop Iowa 412's western end. I-380 was completed in 1985 finally connecting the area to the Interstate Highway System. A 4-cent-per-US-gallon (1.1 ¢/L) increase in Iowa's gas tax in 1988 (equivalent to 11 ¢/US gal [2.9 ¢/L] in 2024 dollars) also added some much needed funds for highway construction. In the early 1990s, connecting Waterloo to Rochester, Minnesota, was looked at as the next big project. A study suggested building a four-lane road in stages all the way into Minnesota, but also suggesting improving the existing two-lane roadway and constructing bypasses around cities. Meanwhile, construction of a bypass around Denver was ongoing. The Denver bypass was initially approved in 1986, but it was not programmed for construction until 1991–1992. Traffic was routed onto the new bypass in October 1994, but the project wasn't completed for another month.

=== Des Moines to Burlington highway ===
In 1996, the Iowa Transportation Commission approved an ambitious, $1.7-billion highway construction plan (equivalent to $3.13 billion in 2024 dollars) that would expand six important corridors to four-lane expressways—and not freeways—including the Des Moines to Burlington route, by 2004. Local officials applauded the project, stating that it would improve the state's economy overall and help southeastern Iowa businesses locally. The project received a major boost when President Bill Clinton signed a $216-billion highway bill on June 9, 1998, out of which $314 million was earmarked for Iowa projects (equivalent to $387 billion and $562 million in 2024 dollars, respectively). Plans to begin work on the new highway were submitted to the transportation commission and approved.

Construction began on the Des Moines-to-Burlington route. Plans for US 63 between Oskaloosa and Ottumwa did not follow the routing of US 63. Instead, it was to follow Iowa 137 south out of Oskaloosa to Eddyville. Then it would follow Iowa 23 from Eddyville to near Chillicothe. From there it would curve east and rejoin US 63 near the Ottumwa Regional Airport. Construction near Eddyville was halted temporarily when the palegreen orchid, a plant considered endangered in Iowa at the time, was found in the sand dune prairie near Eddyville. The relocated highway opened on July 15, 1997. At the same time, what was left of the former Iowa 23 from Ottumwa to Eddyville was turned over to Wapello County and the former routing of US 63 became a new Iowa 23 between Oskaloosa and Iowa 149 near Hedrick; that highway was extended from the new Iowa 23 south to the new expressway.

Budget constraints in the early part of the 2000s caused the Iowa DOT to table some highway projects, but they were still committed to completing the six high-priority corridors. Part of the budget issues were caused by a change in federal earmark philosophy. Prior to this change, the Congress would fund projects individually, but now funding was being given to states in the form of a block grant and discretion on how the funds would be used was now up to the states. The DOT was able to achieve some savings by extending the timeline for completing the priority projects. The Ottumwa bypass was one of the delayed roads. The Iowa Transportation Commission initially approved the road in 1998, but later put the project on hold. The commission re-approved the plan for the nine-mile (14 km) road at a cost of $68 million (equivalent to $115 million in 2024 dollars).

Construction lasted for a couple years; crews were able to make use of a fruitful 2007 road construction season. Ottumwa's bypass opened to traffic on November 19, 2007. The new road shifted US 63 traffic out of downtown and onto US 34 heading east from the intersection of the two highways near the city's John Deere plant. The final section of the 165-mile-long (266 km) Des Moines to Burlington route was completed in November 2008. Governor Chet Culver presided over the ribbon cutting ceremony that celebrated the opening of the Fairfield bypass and the completion of the 1996 highway plan. The next year, the Des Moines to Burlington route was given a single route number, Iowa 163, which had previously extended from Des Moines to Oskaloosa. Between Oskaloosa and Burlington, the Iowa 163 number was overlaid atop the existing route numbers, US 63 and US 34.

=== Bypassed in New Hampton ===
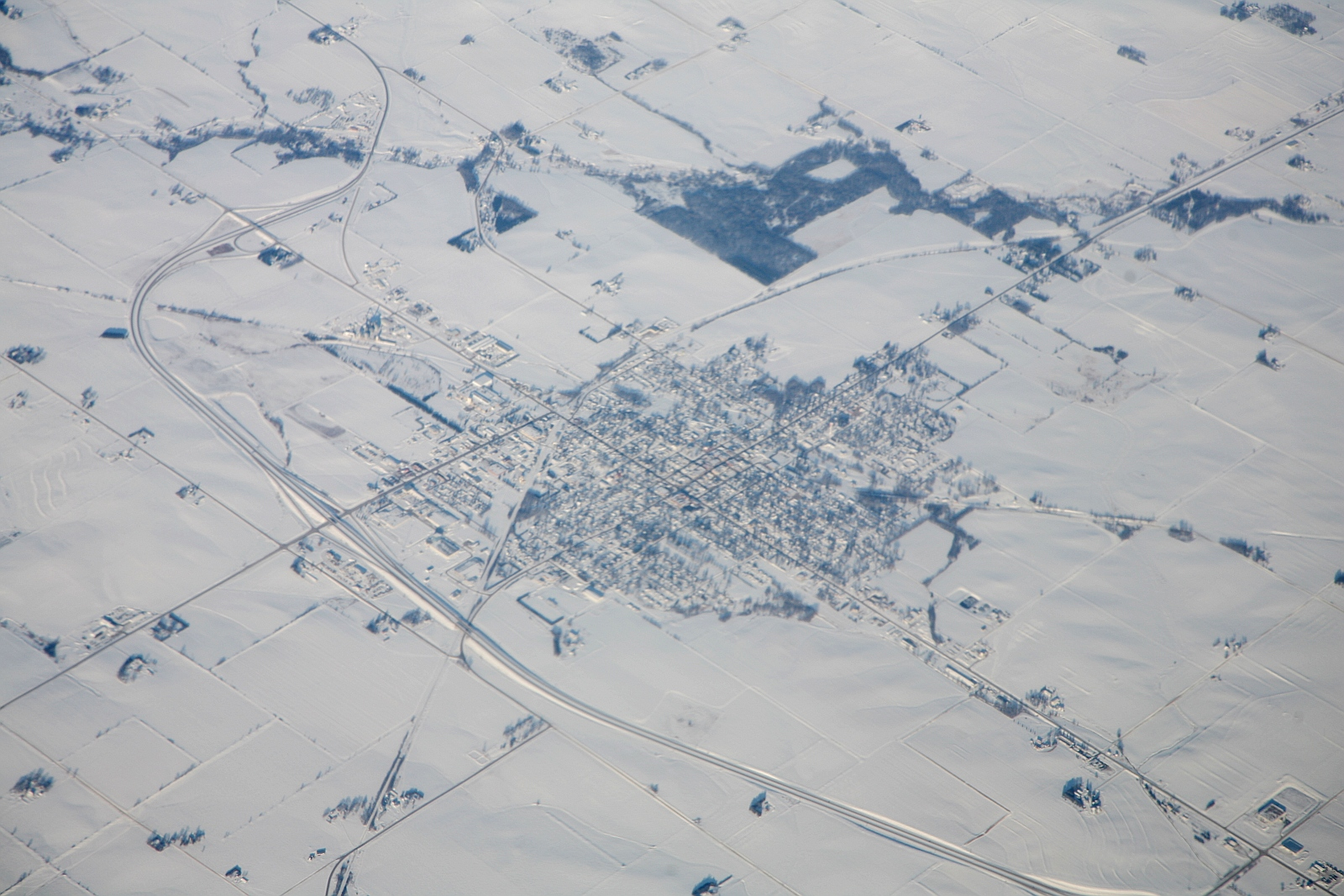
Aerial view of New Hampton showing how US 63 bypasses the town

Plans for a bypass in New Hampton started in the early 1990s after a study reported that building a four-lane road that connected Waterloo and Rochester, Minnesota, was economically feasible. The New Hampton city council discussed potential bypass routes as early as 1991. Initial plans had included connecting the newly constructed bypass of Denver to the New Hampton bypass, but that section was shelved in 1995 due to budget cuts. The actual design of the bypass was not approved until April 1998. Later that year the Iowa DOT pledged to connect the Denver and New Hampton bypasses by 2001. Fourteen people died in accidents on the 15 miles (24 km) between the two cities from 1986 to 1994, so the announcement was welcomed by local residents. In 2001, however, the section of US 63 between the cities found itself again removed from the DOT's five-year plan.

The bypass of New Hampton was complete in 2002, but the four-lane connection to Denver was not. The transition from four lanes to two presented a few dangers – four-lane traffic must slow down from 65–70 to 55 mph (105–115 to 90 km/h) and then the two-lane road itself was in rough shape. Most frustrating to some was that the DOT already owned the right-of-way for the expanded highway, but they chose to allow farmers to grow oats on the land instead. Road construction budgets received a major boost with the American Recovery and Reinvestment Act of 2009. Highway projects that had been pushed back, like the widening of US 63 between Denver and New Hampton, finally had a green light.

Near Frederika, where the new highway bypassed two 90-degree curves, dirt fill was used from a nearby property that was slated for wetland restoration near the Wapsipinicon River. By using the nearby soil, an estimated $500 thousand was saved from the $2.82 million project (equivalent to $726,578 and $4.1 million in 2024 dollars, respectively). The expansion of US 63 from New Hampton to Iowa 188 was completed in 2009. The rest of the connection to Denver was scheduled as part of $600 million in statewide road construction for 2012 (equivalent to $808 million in 2024 dollars).

=== Updating Waterloo ===
The improvements through Waterloo that came about in the late 1960s were showing their age in the 2010s. The railroad underpass that was celebrated for reducing wait times was subject to flooding after a heavy rain. The four lanes of Logan Avenue were too narrow for turning traffic. The east side of Waterloo was seen as economically depressed. The local media saw an improved US 63 as a welcome mat to the downtown area and by extension, the east side. It was an opportunity to improve the way of life for everyone in Waterloo. A tax increment financing district was created along Logan Avenue and through eastern Waterloo with the hope that the rebuilt highway would be a catalyst to economic growth. Six houses were moved out of the construction zone along Logan Avenue and 24 other properties were torn down before work began. These houses and businesses were removed to make room for walking trails along the highway; they were considered to be located too close to the highway.

The project was divided into three phases: north of Newell Street, south of Franklin Street to Jefferson Street across the Cedar River, and the new viaduct between Franklin and Newell. Construction on the segment north of Newell began in 2013 and finished in 2016. The downtown phase was contracted out in January 2017 and finished in early 2019. The biggest piece of the corridor improvement puzzle was the replacement of the railroad underpass. The DOT proposed going over the Canadian National rails instead of under. The viaduct project was estimated to cost $26.4 million. The project entailed filling in the underpass, stabilizing the soil, and mitigating groundwater in addition to building the viaduct. The completed road reopened on November 1, 2019; civic and business leaders held a small ceremony at the foot of the viaduct to celebrate its opening.

== Major intersections ==
County	Location	mi	km	Exit	Destinations	Notes
Davis	Wyacondah Township	0.000	0.000		US 63 south – Kirksville	Continuation into Missouri
Davis	West Grove Township	10.334	16.631		Iowa 2 west – Centerville	Southern end of Iowa 2 overlap
Davis	Cleveland Township	13.689	22.030		Old Highway 2	Former Iowa 2
Davis	Bloomfield	15.193	24.451		Iowa 2 east – Fort Madison	Northern end of Iowa 2 overlap
Davis	Bloomfield	16.020	25.782		Franklin Street	Former Iowa 2
Davis	Perry Township	19.392	31.208		180th Street	Former Iowa 273
Wapello	Ottumwa	33.684	54.209		US 34 west / US 63 Bus. – Albia	Roundabout; southern end of US 34 overlap
Wapello	Ottumwa	34.991	56.313		US 34 Bus. west (Roemer Avenue)	
Wapello	Ottumwa	35.714– 36.180	57.476– 58.226	191	US 34 east / Iowa 163 east – Mount Pleasant	Northern end of US 34 overlap; southern end of Iowa 163 overlap
Wapello	Ottumwa	37.070	59.658	35	Pennsylvania Avenue	
Wapello	Dahlonega Township	38.791	62.428	36	Dahlonega Road	
Wapello	Highland–Richland township line	42.786	68.857	40	US 63 Bus. south / Iowa 149 – Ottumwa	
Wapello	Richland Township	44.280	71.262	42	Ottumwa Regional Airport, Industrial Park	
Wapello	Richland Township	48.203	77.575		Eddyville Road	Former Iowa 23
Wapello	Eddyville	55.297	88.992	53	Iowa 137 south – Eddyville, Albia	
Mahaska	Eddyville	57.046	91.807	54	Marino Avenue	
Mahaska	Oskaloosa	62.879– 63.320	101.194– 101.904	60	Iowa 163 west – Pella, Des Moines	Northern end of Iowa 163 overlap
Mahaska	Oskaloosa	64.896	104.440		11th Street	Former Iowa 309
Mahaska	Oskaloosa	65.655	105.661		Iowa 92 (A Avenue)	
Mahaska	New Sharon	77.820	125.239		Iowa 146 north (N. Main Street) / W. Market Street	
Poweshiek	Montezuma	90.473	145.602		To Iowa 85 (Main Street)	Former western end of Iowa 85
Poweshiek	Malcom Township	98.639	158.744		I-80 – Des Moines, Davenport	
Poweshiek	Malcom Township	101.048	162.621		Historic US 6	
Poweshiek	Malcom Township	102.066	164.259		US 6 east – Brooklyn	Southern end of US 6 overlap
Poweshiek	Malcom Township	104.111	167.550		US 6 west / Historic US 6 east – Grinnell	Northern end of US 6 overlap
Tama	Tama	119.902	192.964		Lincoln Highway Heritage Byway to US 30	
Tama	Tama	120.156	193.372		CR E49 west / Lincoln Highway Heritage Byway – Montour	
Tama	Toledo	120.928	194.615		US 30 – Marshalltown, Cedar Rapids	
Tama	Toledo	121.257	195.144		US 30 Bus.	
Tama	Howard Township	129.127	207.810		CR E29 – Garwin	Former Iowa 229
Tama	Crystal Township	134.169	215.924		Iowa 96 west – Gladbrook	
Tama	Traer	141.314	227.423		Iowa 8 east – Dysart	
Black Hawk	Lincoln Township	150.591	242.353		Iowa 175 west – Grundy Center	
Black Hawk	Hudson	155.388	250.073		Iowa 58 north – Cedar Falls	
Black Hawk	Waterloo	160.540	258.364		US 20 / Iowa 27 to I-380 – Dubuque, Fort Dodge	
Black Hawk	Waterloo	164.249	264.333		University Avenue west	
Black Hawk	Waterloo	164.334– 164.726	264.470– 265.101		US 218 / Washington Street	US 63 splits into a one-way couplet
Black Hawk	Waterloo	165.347	266.100		Franklin Street	Former US 20
Black Hawk	Waterloo	165.437	266.245		One-way couplet ends	
Black Hawk	Waterloo	168.030	270.418		Airline Highway – Airport	Former Iowa 57
Bremer	Denver	177.036	284.912	175	CR C50 – Denver, Janesville	
Bremer	Jefferson Township	180.088	289.824	178	Iowa 3 – Waverly, Oelwein	
Bremer	Warren Township	186.189	299.642		Iowa 93 east – Tripoli	
Bremer	Douglas Township	189.282	304.620		Iowa 188 west – Plainfield	
Bremer	Douglas Township	191.300	307.868		CR C16 – Frederika	Former Iowa 334
Chickasaw	Richland–Dresden township line	197.749	318.246	196	US 18 east / Iowa 346 west – Fredericksburg, Nashua	Southern end of US 18 overlap
Chickasaw	Dayton Township	200.262	322.290	201	US 63 Bus. north / 255th Street – New Hampton	US 63 Business not signed southbound
Chickasaw	New Hampton	205.134	330.131	204	US 18 west / Iowa 24 east – New Hampton, Mason City	Northern end of US 18 overlap
Chickasaw	Washington–Jacksonville township line	206.645	332.563	205	US 63 Bus. south (La Salle Avenue) – New Hampton	US 63 Business not signed northbound
Chickasaw	Jacksonville Township	215.196	346.324		CR B22 – Alta Vista	Former Iowa 289
Howard	Paris Township	218.658	351.896		CR B17 – Elma	Former Iowa 272
Howard	Howard Center Township	227.083	365.455		Iowa 9 – Cresco, Riceville	
Howard	Forest City Township	232.600	374.333		CR A21 – Lime Springs	Former Iowa 157
Howard	Chester	237.758	382.634		US 63 north – Rochester	Continuation into Minnesota
1.000 mi = 1.609 km; 1.000 km = 0.621 mi: Concurrency terminus
