= Iowa Highway 93 =

State highway in Iowa, United States

Iowa Highway 93
- Iowa 93 highlighted in red

Route information
- Maintained by Iowa DOT
- Length: 29.534 mi (47.530 km)
- Existed: 1920s–present

Major junctions
- West end: US 63 near Tripoli
- East end: Iowa 150 in Fayette

Location
- Country: United States
- State: Iowa
- Counties: Bremer; Fayette

Highway system
- Iowa Primary Highway System; Interstate; US; State; Secondary; Scenic
| ← Iowa 92 | → Iowa 96 |

Iowa Highway 93 is a state highway that runs from east to west through two counties in northeastern Iowa. Iowa 93 is 29.55 miles (47.56 km) long. The eastern terminus of Iowa 93 is at its junction with Iowa Highway 150 in Fayette. The western terminus of Iowa 93 is at an intersection with U.S. Route 63 4 miles (6.4 km) west of Tripoli.

== Route description ==
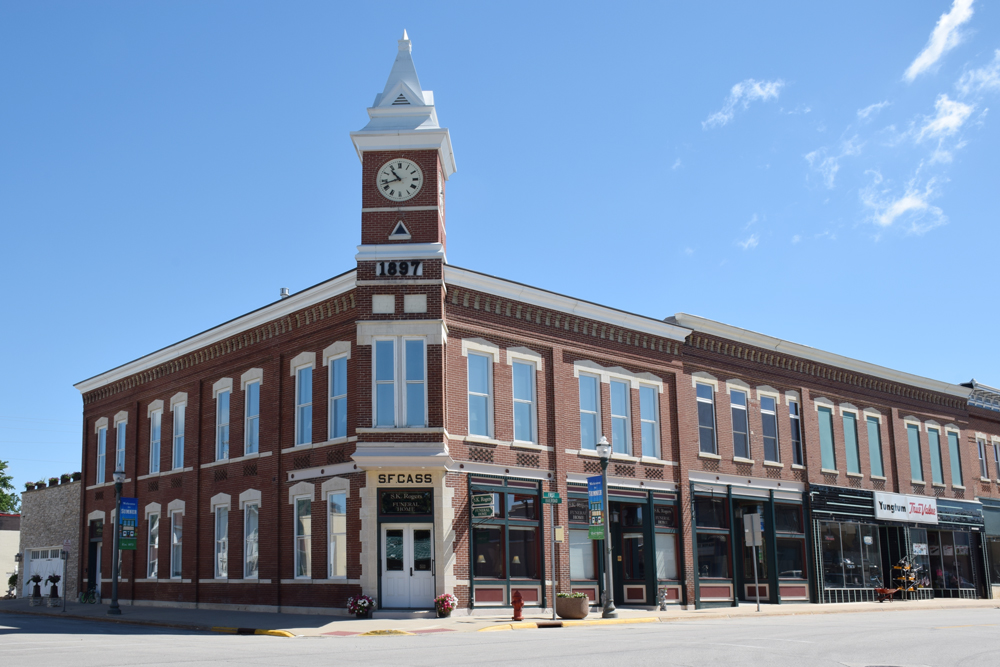
Bank of Sumner in Sumner on Iowa 93

Iowa Highway 93 begins at U.S. Highway 63 four miles (6.4 km) west of Tripoli, entering on 7th Avenue. At Tripoli, Highway 93 turns north onto Main Street and heads through the heart of town. North of Tripoli, Iowa 93 travels a 2-mile (3.2 km) stretch of highway, crossing the Wapsipinicon River before curving to the northeast and then to the east. Once again heading east, Iowa 93 travels 7 miles (11 km) to Sumner. East of Sumner, Iowa 93 journeys east through Fayette County for 15 miles (24 km) until it ends at Iowa Highway 150 at Fayette.

== History ==
By 1926, Primary Road No. 93 had been designated between Primary Road No. 59, now U.S. Route 63, and Sumner. By 1952, Iowa 93 was paved in Fayette County. The portion in Bremer County was paved in 1955.

== Major intersections ==
| County | Location | mi | km | Destinations | Notes |
|---|---|---|---|---|---|
| Bremer | Tripoli | 0.000 | 0.000 | US 63 – Denver, New Hampton | |
| Fayette | Fayette | 29.534 | 47.530 | Iowa 150 – West Union, Oelwein | |
1.000 mi = 1.609 km; 1.000 km = 0.621 mi
