= 1969 Iowa highway renumbering =

This article is part of the highway renumbering series.
Alabama	1928, 1957
Arkansas	1926
California	1964
Colorado	1953, 1968
Connecticut	1932, 1963
Florida	1945
Indiana	1926
Iowa	1926, 1969
Louisiana	1955
Maine	1933
Massachusetts	1933
Minnesota	1934
Missouri	1926
Montana	1932
Nebraska	1926
Nevada	1976
New Jersey	1927, 1953
New Mexico	1988
New York	1927, 1930
North Carolina	1934, 1937, 1940, 1961
Ohio	1923, 1927, 1962
Pennsylvania	1928, 1961
Puerto Rico	1953
South Carolina	1928, 1937
South Dakota	1927, 1975
Tennessee	1983
Texas	1939
Utah	1962, 1977
Virginia	1923, 1928, 1933, 1940, 1958
Washington	1964
Wisconsin	1926
Wyoming	1927

On January 1, 1969, the Iowa State Highway Commission, now known as the Iowa Department of Transportation, renumbered several state highways. The changes to the highway system fixed a number of issues: creating continuous route numbers across state lines, removing duplicate route numbers where they were unnecessary, and extending route numbers in some locations. Twenty-six sections of highway were assigned new route numbers, duplicate route numbers were removed on eleven sections, and one route number was extended to another section.

== New routes ==
Number	Length (mi)	Length (km)	Southern or western terminus	Northern or eastern terminus	Formed	Removed	Notes
Iowa 4	148.67	239.26	Iowa 44 in Panora	MN 4 at the Minnesota state line	1969	current	Previously Iowa 17
Iowa 5	104.55	168.26	Route 5 at the Missouri state line	I-35 at West Des Moines	1969	current	Previously Iowa 60
Iowa 7	76.27	122.74	Iowa 3 near Aurelia	US 20 in Fort Dodge	1969	current	Previously Iowa 5
Iowa 15	63.52	102.23	Iowa 3 near Rolfe	MN 15 at the Minnesota state line	1969	current	Previously Iowa 44
Iowa 15	4.79	7.71	Route 15 at the Missouri state line	Iowa 2 at Milton	1969	2003	Previously Iowa 23
Iowa 17	102.62	165.15	Iowa 141 at Granger	US 18 at Wesley	1969	current	Previously Iowa 60
Iowa 23	14.66	23.59	Iowa 137 in Eddyville	US 63 in Ottumwa	1969	1997	Previously Iowa 15
Iowa 26	11.44	18.41	Iowa 9 in Lansing	MN 26 at the Minnesota state line	1969	current	Previously Iowa 182
Iowa 39	24.42	39.30	US 59 / Iowa 141 at Dension	Iowa 175 in Odebolt	1969	current	Previously Iowa 4
Iowa 44	104.83	168.71	US 30 near Logan	Iowa 141 near Grimes	1969	current	Previously Iowa 39 and Iowa 64
Iowa 60	55.93	90.01	US 75 near Le Mars	MN 60 at the Minnesota state line	1969	current	Previously Iowa 33
Iowa 70	25.91	41.70	Columbus City	US 6 in West Liberty	1969	current	Previously Iowa 76
Iowa 76	44.82	72.13	US 18 in Marquette	MN 76 at the Minnesota state line	1969	current	Previously Iowa 13
Iowa 81	2.22	3.57	Route 81 at the Missouri state line	Iowa 2 at Farmington	1969	current	Previously Iowa 114
Iowa 114	9.20	14.81	Iowa 92 near West Chester	Iowa 22 at Wellman	1969	1980	Previously Iowa 81
Iowa 130	38.80	62.44	Iowa 38 in Tipton	US 61 / US 67 in Davenport	1969	current	Previously Iowa 150
Iowa 182	9.36	15.06	US 18 in Inwood	Iowa 9 near Larchwood	1969	current	Previously Iowa 26
Iowa 202	10.50	16.90	Route 202 at the Missouri state line	Iowa 2 near Moulton	1969	current	Previously Iowa 142
Iowa 254	7.91	12.73	Iowa 9 near Buffalo Center	MN 254 at the Minnesota state line	1969	1980	Previously Iowa 322
Iowa 322	0.45	0.72	Massena	Iowa 92 at Massena	1969	1972	Previously Iowa 254
Iowa 985	5.57	8.96	I-29 / US 20 / US 77 in Sioux City	Woodbury–Plymouth county line at Sioux City	1969	1973	Previously Iowa 7

== Former routes ==
Number	Length (mi)	Length (km)	Southern or western terminus	Northern or eastern terminus	Formed	Removed	Notes
Iowa 4	29.41	47.33	US 59 / Iowa 141 at Denison	Iowa 175 at Odebolt	1920	1968	Became Iowa 39
Iowa 5	76.57	123.23	Iowa 3 near Aurelia	US 20 in Fort Dodge	1920	1968	Became Iowa 7
Iowa 7	22.09	35.55	I-29 / US 77 in Sioux City	Iowa 3 near Brunsville	1957	1968	Portions given to Plymouth County and the rest became Iowa 985
Iowa 15	14.66	23.59	Iowa 137 in Eddyville	US 63 in Ottumwa	1937	1968	Became Iowa 23
Iowa 17	146.43	235.66	Iowa 64 in Panora	MN 4 at the Minnesota state line	1920	1968	Became Iowa 4
Iowa 23	4.78	7.69	Route 15 at the Missouri state line	Iowa 2 in Milton	1926	1968	Became Iowa 15
Iowa 26	9.31	14.98	US 18 in Inwood	Iowa 9 near Larchwood	1930	1968	Became Iowa 182
Iowa 33	55.90	89.96	US 75 near Le Mars	MN 60 at the Minnesota state line	1931	1968	Became Iowa 60
Iowa 39	11.63	18.72	US 30 near Logan	Iowa 64 / Iowa 191 in Portsmouth	1920	1968	Became part of Iowa 44
Iowa 44	63.63	102.40	Iowa 3 near Rolfe	MN 15 at the Minnesota state line	1920	1968	Became Iowa 15
Iowa 60	225.27	362.54	Route 5 at the Missouri state line	US 18 at Wesley	1920	1968	Became Iowa 5 and Iowa 17
Iowa 76	25.91	41.70	Columbus City	US 6 in West Liberty	1920	1968	Became Iowa 70
Iowa 81	9.20	14.81	Iowa 92 near West Chester	Iowa 22 at Wellman	1920	1968	Became Iowa 114
Iowa 114	2.22	3.57	Route 81 at the Missouri state line	Iowa 2 at Farmington	1924	1968	Became Iowa 81
Iowa 142	10.50	16.90	Route 202 at the Missouri state line	Iowa 2 near Moulton	1926	1968	Became Iowa 202
Iowa 182	11.44	18.41	Iowa 9 in Lansing	MN 26 at the Minnesota state line	1930	1968	Became Iowa 26
Iowa 254	0.45	0.72	Massena	Iowa 92 at Massena	1932	1968	Became Iowa 322
Iowa 322	7.91	12.73	Iowa 9 near Buffalo Center	MN 254 at the Minnesota state line	1935	1968	Became Iowa 254

== Existing route changes ==
Number	Change in length		Southern or western terminus	Northern or eastern terminus	Formed	Removed	Notes
Number	mi (Note: Calculated by subtracting the 1965 mileage from the 1970 mileage)	km	Southern or western terminus	Northern or eastern terminus	Formed	Removed	Notes
Iowa 13	-46.66	−75.09	US 151 near Marion US 52 near Froelich	US 30 near Bertram MN 76 near Dorchester	1920	current	Extended over Iowa 150 and truncated north of US 52
Iowa 21	21.46	34.54	Iowa 8 at Dysart	Iowa 412 in Waterloo	1934	current	Extended over new road
Iowa 64	-273.76	−440.57	US 6 in Council Bluffs	US 151 in Anamosa	1936	current	Mileage assigned to Iowa 191, Iowa 44, and Iowa 330
Iowa 150	-80.15	−128.99	US 151 / Iowa 13 in Marion	US 61 / US 67 in Davenport	1941	current	Assigned to Iowa 13 and Iowa 130
Iowa 191	30.52	49.12	US 6 in Council Bluffs	Iowa 44 in Portsmouth	1930	current	Extended over Iowa 64
Iowa 330	20.72	33.35	US 65 / Iowa 117 near Mingo	US 30 in Marshalltown	1948	current	Extended over Iowa 64

== See also ==
- List of Iowa state highways
