= Iowa Highway 59 =

Iowa Highway 59

Route information
- Maintained by Iowa State Highway Commission
- Existed: 1920–1934

Location
- Country: United States
- State: Iowa

Highway system
- Iowa Primary Highway System; Interstate; US; State; Secondary; Scenic
| ← US 59 | → Iowa 60 |

Iowa Highway 59 (Iowa 59) was the designation of a state highway in Iowa that ran from the Missouri state line near Cincinnati to the Minnesota state line near Chester. Iowa 59 was in existence for fourteen years—from 1920 to 1934. Today, the route is related to the following highways:

- Iowa Highway 5 from the Missouri state line near Cincinnati to Albia
- Iowa Highway 137 from Albia to Oskaloosa
- U.S. Highway 63 from Oskaloosa to the Minnesota state line near Chester
