= Iowa Highway 23 (1969–1997) =

Former state highway in Iowa, United States

Iowa Highway 23
- Iowa 23 highlighted in red

Route information
- Length: 14.316 mi (23.039 km)
- Existed: January 1, 1969–July 16, 1997

Major junctions
- South end: US 63 in Ottumwa
- North end: Iowa 137 in Eddyville

Location
- Country: United States
- State: Iowa
- Counties: Wapello

Highway system
- Iowa Primary Highway System; Interstate; US; State; Secondary; Scenic
← Iowa 23	→ Iowa 24

Iowa Highway 23 (Iowa 23) was a 14-mile-long (23 km) state highway in southern Iowa. It ran from U.S. Route 63 (US 63) in Ottumwa to Iowa 137 in Eddyville. It was created in 1969 when it traded route numbers with Iowa 15 in Van Buren County. It was removed from the state highway system in 1997 when US 63 was rerouted between Ottumwa and Oskaloosa.

== Route description ==
Iowa 23 began in downtown Ottumwa underneath a bridge on which US 63 passed overhead. Direct access to US 63 was provided by a ramp which connected to Kitterman Avenue. The first three quarter-miles (1.2 km) of the highway was on a one-way couplet; northbound Iowa 23 followed 2nd Street West, while southbound was on Main Street West. The two directions converged at an intersection with McPherson Street, which is located next to a level crossing of the Dakota, Minnesota and Eastern Railroad. As Iowa 23 left Ottumwa, it traveled northwest on a two-lane highway with narrow shoulders.

Iowa 23 continued to the northwest through rural Wapello County. The entire route paralleled the Des Moines River. Between Ottumwa and Chillicothe, the BNSF Railway runs near the highway and the river. The tracks cross over to the western side of the river halfway between Ottumwa and Chillicothe. An intersection with Chillicothe Road, signed as County Road T67 (CR T67) roughly marked the halfway point of Iowa 23. The second half of the route was more sparsely populated than the first half; corn fields and the occasional country home lined both sides of the highway. Iowa 23 entered Eddyville from the southeast. It ended at a T intersection with Iowa 37. Iowa 23 made up the southern leg while Iowa 137 was the western and northern legs.

== History ==
Iowa 23 was created on January 1, 1969, when the Iowa State Highway Commission renumbered several state highways. Route numbers across the state were changed in order to match up with adjoining highways in neighboring states. In this case, Iowa 23 in Van Buren County was renumbered to Iowa 15 to match Route 15 in Missouri. Similarly, Iowa 15 became Iowa 23 in Wapello County. When Iowa 23 was designated in 1969, it had a bituminous surface. It was upgraded to portland cement in 1975.

Iowa 23 ceased to exist on July 16, 1997; it was replaced by a relocated US 63 between Ottumwa and Oskaloosa. A four-lane road connecting Des Moines and Burlington was first proposed in the 1980s. The mayor of Ottumwa supported the option that eventually became US 63, which linked Iowa 23 to US 63 south of the Ottumwa Airport. Box culverts on the section between Ottumwa and Eddyville were built in late 1994 and construction began in earnest in early 1995. When the segment opened, it was the only part of the new Ottumwa-to-Oskaloosa route that was four lanes.

== Major intersections ==
The entire route was in Wapello County.

Location	mi	km	Destinations	Notes
Ottumwa	0.000	0.000	US 63 (Wapello Street)	One-way streets; Iowa 23 began at centerline of US 63 bridge
Ottumwa	0.037	0.060	To US 63 (Kitterman Avenue)	Access road to US 63 bridge
Ottumwa	0.708	1.139	Main Street, McPherson Avenue	End of one-way couplet
Richland Township	7.332	11.800	Chillicothe Road (CR T67)	
Eddyville	14.316	23.039	Iowa 137 – Oskaloosa, Albia	
1.000 mi = 1.609 km; 1.000 km = 0.621 mi: Incomplete access
