= IA 58 =

IA 58 or IA58 may refer to:

== Aviation ==
- FMA IA 58 Pucará, Argentine counter-insurgency attack aircraft

== Roads ==
- Iowa Highway 58, a state highway in Iowa, United States
