= Iowa Highway 58 =

State highway in Iowa, United States

Iowa Highway 58
- Iowa 58 highlighted in red

Route information
- Maintained by Iowa DOT
- Length: 11.943 mi (19.220 km)
- Existed: 1920–present

Major junctions
- South end: US 63 at Hudson
- US 20 / Iowa 27 in Cedar Falls
- North end: US 218 / Iowa 27 / Iowa 57 near Cedar Falls

Location
- Country: United States
- State: Iowa
- Counties: Black Hawk

Highway system
- Iowa Primary Highway System; Interstate; US; State; Secondary; Scenic
← Iowa 57	→ US 59

Iowa Highway 58 (Iowa 58) is a state highway that runs from north to south in northeast Iowa. A five-and-a-half-mile (8.9 km) portion of the highway is overlapped by the Avenue of the Saints. Iowa 58 begins at U.S. Highway 63 (US 63) in Hudson and ends at an interchange with US 218 and Iowa 57. Iowa 58's route has changed many times in its history, but has always served Black Hawk County.

== Route description ==
Iowa Highway 58 begins at the intersection of U.S. Highway 63, known locally as Sergeant Road, and Hudson Road on the southern edge of Hudson. Iowa 58 passes Hudson High School and turns to the northwest through town. North of Hudson, the highway straightens to the north again and travels 4 miles (6.4 km) to a partial cloverleaf interchange with U.S. Highway 20 (US 20). Iowa 58 turns east onto US 20 and shares the roadway for one mile (1.6 km).

Iowa 58 leaves US 20 at exit 255 on the outskirts of Cedar Falls. From the opposite direction, Iowa Highway 27, the Avenue of the Saints highway, also exits US 20 and the two routes head north. For 2 1/2 miles (4.0 km), Iowa 27 / Iowa 58 travel on a signal-controlled freeway. This is the only section of the Avenue of the Saints highway in Iowa that is controlled by traffic lights. North of Greenhill Road, the last signal-controlled intersection, Iowa 27 / Iowa 58 share a freeway. One mile (1.6 km) north of the Greenhill Road intersection is an interchange with University Avenue. East of this interchange, University Avenue is designated as Iowa Highway 934, but it is never signed as such.

Iowa 27 / Iowa 58 continue north for 2 miles (3.2 km), crossing the Cedar River near George Wyth State Park, before Iowa 58 ends at a full interchange with U.S. Route 218 and Iowa Highway 57. The US 218 interchange is also the eastern end of Iowa 57. The Avenue of the Saints highway continues north with US 218 towards Waverly.

== History ==
The original Primary Road 58 connected the Jefferson Highway, now U.S. Highway 65 west of Eldora to the Red Ball Route, now U.S. Route 218, east of Dysart. Primary Road 58 followed what is now Iowa Highway 175 to U.S. Highway 63 to Iowa Highway 8. In the 1926 Iowa highway renumbering, Iowa 58 was truncated so that its east end was at Iowa Highway 14, and sections were renumbered Iowa 90 and Iowa 8. In March 1932, Iowa 58 extended east to Iowa Highway 137 (then Iowa Highway 59), replacing Iowa 90. In August 1932, Iowa 58 was truncated west to Grundy Center, as Iowa Highway 57 replaced the section west of Grundy Center. In 1935, Iowa 58 extended north towards Hudson. It headed along Hudson Road and ended at US 20 on the northern edge of Cedar Falls. As a result of the highway renumbering in 1969, Iowa 58 was truncated at US 63 in Hudson, and Iowa 175 replaced the section west of Hudson (along with the section of Iowa 57 that was formerly part of Iowa 58). In the 1980s, US 20 was rerouted onto a freeway south of Cedar Falls and Waterloo. By 1989, Iowa 58's north end had been truncated to the new freeway. In the early 1990s, the freeway which Iowa 58 now shares with Iowa 27 was constructed. By 1996, it had been extended and routed onto the new Avenue of the Saints freeway, giving it its current length. The Iowa 27 designation was extended over the entire Avenue of the Saints highway in 2001.

== Major intersections ==
The entire route is in Black Hawk County.

Location	mi	km	Exit	Destinations	Notes
Hudson	0.000	0.000		US 63 – Waterloo, Traer	
Cedar Falls	5.071	8.161	224	US 20 west / Hudson Road – University of Northern Iowa, UNI-Dome, Fort Dodge	Southern end of US 20 overlap; exit numbers follow US 20
Cedar Falls	6.162	9.917	225	US 20 east / Iowa 27 south to I-380 – Dubuque	Northern end of US 20 overlap; southern end of Iowa 27 overlap
Cedar Falls	6.566	10.567		Ridgeway Avenue	At-grade intersection; future interchange; exit numbers follow Iowa 27
Cedar Falls	7.567	12.178	181	Viking Road	Single point urban interchange
Cedar Falls	8.713	14.022	182	Greenhill Road	At-grade intersection; future double-teardrop interchange
Cedar Falls	9.860	15.868	183	University Avenue – University of Northern Iowa	
Cedar Falls	10.466– 10.656	16.843– 17.149	184	18th Street, Waterloo Road	
Cedar Falls	11.943	19.220	—	US 218 / Iowa 27 north / Iowa 57 west – Cedar Falls, Waterloo, Waverly, Airport	Northern end of Iowa 27 overlap
1.000 mi = 1.609 km; 1.000 km = 0.621 mi: Concurrency terminus; Unopened
