= Iowa Highway 96 =

State highway in Iowa, United States

Iowa Highway 96
- Iowa 96 highlighted in red

Route information
- Maintained by Iowa DOT
- Length: 16.635 mi (26.771 km)

Major junctions
- West end: Iowa 14 southwest of Conrad
- East end: US 63 east of Gladbrook

Location
- Country: United States
- State: Iowa
- Counties: Marshall, Tama

Highway system
- Iowa Primary Highway System; Interstate; US; State; Secondary; Scenic
← Iowa 93	→ Iowa 98

Iowa Highway 96 (Iowa 96) is a state highway which runs from west to east in central Iowa. It begins at Iowa Highway 14 southwest of Conrad and ends at U.S. Highway 63 east of Gladbrook.

== Route description ==
Iowa Highway 96 begins at a T-intersection with Iowa Highway 14 3 miles (4.8 km) southwest of Conrad. From Iowa 14, it heads due east for 10 miles (16 km) towards Gladbrook. East of Gladbrook, it continues east, angling slightly to the southeast, for 6 miles (9.7 km) until it ends at another T-intersection with U.S. Highway 63.

== History ==
Primary Road No. 96 was originally designated as a 6-mile-long (9.7 km), unpaved spur route connecting Gladbrook to Primary Road No. 59 southwest of Traer. In 1926, Highway 59 became U.S. Highway 63. By 1947, the highway had been extended west to Iowa 14. By 1956, the entire route was paved.

== Major intersections ==
County	Location	mi	km	Destinations	Notes
Marshall	Liscomb Township	0.000	0.000	Iowa 14 – Marshalltown, Grundy Center	
Tama	Crystal Township	16.635	26.771	US 63 – Traer, Toledo	
1.000 mi = 1.609 km; 1.000 km = 0.621 mi
