= Iowa Highway 15 (Van Buren County) =

State highway in Iowa, United States

Iowa Highway 15
- Iowa 15 highlighted in red

Route information
- Length: 4.655 mi (7.491 km)
- Existed: January 1, 1969–July 1, 2003

Major junctions
- South end: Route 15 south of Milton
- North end: Iowa 2 in Milton

Location
- Country: United States
- State: Iowa
- Counties: Van Buren

Highway system
- Iowa Primary Highway System; Interstate; US; State; Secondary; Scenic
← Iowa 15	→ Iowa 16

Iowa Highway 15 (Iowa 15) was a short state highway in Van Buren County. It ran from the Missouri state line, where it connected to Route 15 to Iowa 2 in Milton. The highway was designated on January 1, 1969, when the Iowa State Highway Commission renumbered several state highways in order to match up with adjoining highways in neighboring states. The route ceased to exist on July 1, 2003, when the Iowa Department of Transportation turned over 700 miles (1,100 km) of state highways that mostly served local traffic. While it was in service, there were two Iowa 15s in the state; the other was significantly longer and located in the northern part of the state thus avoiding confusion between the two routes.

== Route description ==
Iowa 15 began as a continuation of Route 15 in Missouri. It headed north through the farmland of Jackson Township, the southwesternmost township in Van Buren County. The highway ran over relatively flat terrain, only undulating approximately 40 feet (12 m) over the length of the route. Near the midpoint of the route, it curves slightly to the west and then continues to the north. It enters the Milton city limits from the south. The highway ends at an intersection with Iowa 2.

== History ==
Iowa 15 was designated on January 1, 1969, when the Iowa State Highway Commission renumbered several state highways. Route numbers across the state were changed in order to match up with adjoining highways in neighboring states. In this case, Iowa 23 in Van Buren County was renumbered to match Route 15 in Missouri. Similarly, Iowa 15 in Wapello County became Iowa 23. Coincidentally, a second Iowa 15 was designated at the same time in the northern part of the state. That route was previously Iowa 44 and was renumbered to match Minnesota State Highway 15.

In 2002, more than 700 miles (1,100 km) of low-traffic state highways, including Iowa 15, were identified by the Iowa Department of Transportation (DOT) because they primarily served local traffic. Typically, when the DOT wished to transfer a road to a county or locality, both parties had to agree to terms and the DOT would have to either improve the road or give money to the other party to maintain the road. However, with the significant mileage the DOT wished to turn over, the Iowa General Assembly passed a law which granted the DOT a one-time exemption from the transfer rules effective July 1, 2003. Iowa 15 was replaced by County Road V56 (which continues north to CR J40).

== Major intersections ==
The entire route was in Van Buren County.

Location	mi	km	Destinations	Notes
Jackson Township	0.000	0.000	Route 15 south – Memphis	Continuation into Missouri
Milton	4.655	7.491	Iowa 2 / CR V56 – Farmington, Bloomfield	
1.000 mi = 1.609 km; 1.000 km = 0.621 mi
