= Iowa Highway 934 =

Former state highway in Iowa, United States

Iowa Highway 934
- University Avenue
- Iowa 934 highlighted in red

Route information
- Maintained by Iowa State Highway Commission
- Length: 4.881 mi (7.855 km)
- Existed: 1998–2016
- History: Truncated in 2014

Major junctions
- West end: Iowa 27 / Iowa 58 in Cedar Falls
- East end: US 63 in Waterloo

Location
- Country: United States
- State: Iowa
- Counties: Black Hawk

Highway system
- Iowa Primary Highway System; Interstate; US; State; Secondary; Scenic
← Iowa 930	→ Iowa 946

Iowa Highway 934 (Iowa 934) was an unsigned state highway in Cedar Falls and Waterloo, Iowa. It was created in 1998 after University Avenue was vacated by U.S. Highway 218 (US 218), which had recently moved to a new freeway a few miles north. Iowa 934 extended from the Iowa 27 / Iowa 58 freeway in Cedar Falls, which was constructed at the same time as the US 218 freeway, to US 63 (Sergeant Road).

== Route description ==
Iowa 934 began along University Avenue at an interchange with Iowa Highway 27 and Iowa Highway 58 in Cedar Falls. It traveled east past College Square Mall and the restaurants which surrounded it before turned to the southeast at Waterloo Road. It passed through a residential neighborhood followed by a commercial area dotted with auto dealerships and restaurants.

Just three-quarters mile (1,200 m) into Waterloo, University Avenue met Greenhill Road at an unusual partial cloverleaf interchange. From Greenhill Road, it continued southeast, passing many restaurants which served as a buffer from the road. Just before Ansborough Avenue, Iowa 934 turned to the east, straightening out for the rest of the trip. One-half mile (800 m) from its eastern end, University Avenue crossed Black Hawk Creek, a tributary of the Cedar River. The highway ended at an intersection with Sergeant Road, which carries US 63. The intersection with US 63 was less than one-quarter mile (400 m) away from US 63's interchange with US 218.

== History ==
Prior to the creation of Iowa 934, US 218 followed University Avenue. As the Leo P. Rooff Expressway was being built, US 218 was gradually rerouted off of University. US 218 had been completely removed from University Avenue by 1997. In 1998, the Iowa Department of Transportation took over the segment of University Avenue from the Iowa 58 expressway to US 63, designating it Iowa 934.

On May 12, 2014, the Cedar Falls city council accepted an agreement with the Iowa DOT to transfer control of Iowa 934 within the city limits. The DOT paid the City of Cedar Falls $20 million to complete the transfer on July 21. A similar agreement in Waterloo is expected later in 2014.

== Major intersections ==
The entire route was in Black Hawk County.

Location	mi	km	Destinations	Notes
Cedar Falls	0.000	0.000	Iowa 27 / Iowa 58	
Cedar Falls	0.918	1.477	Waterloo Road	
Waterloo	2.725	4.385	Greenhill Road	Non-freeway interchange
Waterloo	4.881	7.855	US 63 (Sergeant Road)	
1.000 mi = 1.609 km; 1.000 km = 0.621 mi
