= Denver Community School District =

Public school district in Denver, Iowa, United States

Coordinates: 42.669356°N 92.329942°W

Location
- Denver, Iowa Black Hawk and Bremer counties United States
- Coordinates: 42.669356, -92.329942

District information
- Type: Local school district
- Grades: K-12
- Superintendent: Brad Laures
- Schools: 4
- Budget: $12,242,000 (2020-21)
- NCES District ID: 1908940

Students and staff
- Students: 995 (2022-23)
- Teachers: 63.95 FTE
- Staff: 63.17 FTE
- Student–teacher ratio: 15.56
- Athletic conference: North Iowa Cedar League
- District mascot: Cyclones
- Colors: Red and Gold

Other information
- Website: www.denver-cyclones.com

The Denver Community School District is a rural public school district that serves the town of Denver, Iowa and surrounding areas in southern Bremer County and northern Black Hawk County.

The school, which serves all grade levels K-12 on one campus, is located at 520 Lincoln St. in Denver. The Early Elementary School (PK) is located at 401 E. Franling St. in Denver.

The school's mascot is the Cyclone. Their colors are red and gold.

== Schools ==
- Denver Early Elementary School
- Denver Elementary School
- Denver Middle School
- Denver High School

=== Denver High School ===
==== Athletics ====
The Cyclones compete in the North Iowa Cedar League Conference in the following sports:

- Bowling
- Cross Country (boys and girls)
  - Boys' 2-time Class 1A State Champions (1994, 2013)
- Volleyball (girls)
  - 2-time Class 2A State Champions (2024, 2025)
- Football (boys)
  - State Champions - 1995
- Basketball (boys and girls)
  - Boys' State Champions - 1984
- Wrestling (boys and girls)
  - Boys' State Champions (as Denver-Tripoli) - 2010, 2012 (Denver ended shared wrestling with Tripoli in 2017)
- Track and Field (boys and girls)
- Golf (boys and girls)
  - Boys' State Champions - 1982
  - Girls' State Champions - 1980, 1989
- Baseball (boys)
- Softball (girls)
- Soccer (boys and girls)
- Tennis (boys and girls)

== See also ==
- List of school districts in Iowa
- List of high schools in Iowa
