= Iowa Highway 412 =

State highway in Iowa, United States

Iowa Highway 412
- San Marnan Drive
- Iowa 412 highlighted in red on a modern map of Waterloo

Route information
- Maintained by Iowa DOT
- Length: 4.72 mi (7.60 km)
- Existed: 1960–1983

Major junctions
- West end: US 63 in Waterloo
- East end: US 218 in Waterloo

Location
- Country: United States
- State: Iowa
- Counties: Black Hawk

Highway system
- Iowa Primary Highway System; Interstate; US; State; Secondary; Scenic
← Iowa 410	→ Iowa 413

Iowa Highway 412 (Iowa 412) was a state highway in Waterloo, Iowa. It began at U.S. Highway 63 (US 63) in southwestern Waterloo and traveled to the east and northeast approximately four and three-quarters miles (7.6 km) to US 218 in southeastern Waterloo. The route served as a southern bypass of Waterloo. The highway was added to the primary highway system in 1960 and given to the City of Waterloo in 1983. It was replaced in function by US 20, which that year relocated onto a freeway less than one-half mile (800 m) south of San Marnan Drive.

== Route description ==
Iowa 412 began at an intersection with US 63, also known as Sergeant Road, in southwestern Waterloo. It headed west on an undivided four-lane road. It intersected 4th Street, which prior to the opening of Sergeant Road in 1968 was the western end of the highway. Continuing east, the highway widened to add a left-turn lane, which gave way to a grassy median between intersections. Just south of Covenant Hospital, Iowa 412 intersected the northern end of Iowa 21. Shortly thereafter, the roadway turned sharply to the northeast and passed Crossroads Mall. The highway ended at La Porte Road, which carried US 218.

== History ==
Iowa 412 was added to the primary highway system in 1960. At that time, its western end was about one-half mile (800 m) east of where it lay for most of its existence. Sergeant Road, which today carries US 63 into Waterloo from the southwest, had not yet been constructed. 4th Street came up from the south and Iowa 412 began at a T-intersection. At the eastern end, the junction with US 218 was a Y-intersection slightly north of its final endpoint. In 1962, the Waterloo City Council renamed 32 streets and roads in the city. Among them, Iowa 412 became East or West San Marnan Drive for its entire length; previously, it was known by Highway 412 or Frontage Road.

In the late 1960s, plans for a new freeway in the Waterloo–Cedar Falls area were unveiled. The new highway had a working name of "Freeway 520". After the new road was completed, US 20 would be rerouted out of Waterloo and Cedar Falls and onto the freeway. Early plans called for the freeway to replace Iowa 412, control of which would then revert to the City of Waterloo. Construction coincided with the creation of Interstate 380 in the area. Freeway 520 was built and was opened in phases. Along Iowa 412, it was built from the east up to Iowa 21 in early 1984. By the end of the year, the freeway extended to US 63. The western end of Iowa 412 at US 63 was obliterated in order to make way for the freeway. The highway was temporarily rerouted onto what would become the eastbound exit ramp on the new US 20. The City of Waterloo and the Iowa Department of Transportation entered an agreement to transfer jurisdiction of Iowa 412 to the city on October 1, 1983.

== Major intersections ==
The entire route was in Waterloo, Black Hawk County.

mi	km	Destinations	Notes
0.00	0.00	US 63 (Sergeant Road) – Waterloo, Hudson	
3.06	4.92	Iowa 21 south (Hawkeye Road) – Dysart	
4.72	7.60	US 218 (La Porte Road) – Waterloo, La Porte City	
1.000 mi = 1.609 km; 1.000 km = 0.621 mi
