= Austinville, Iowa =

- Unincorporated community
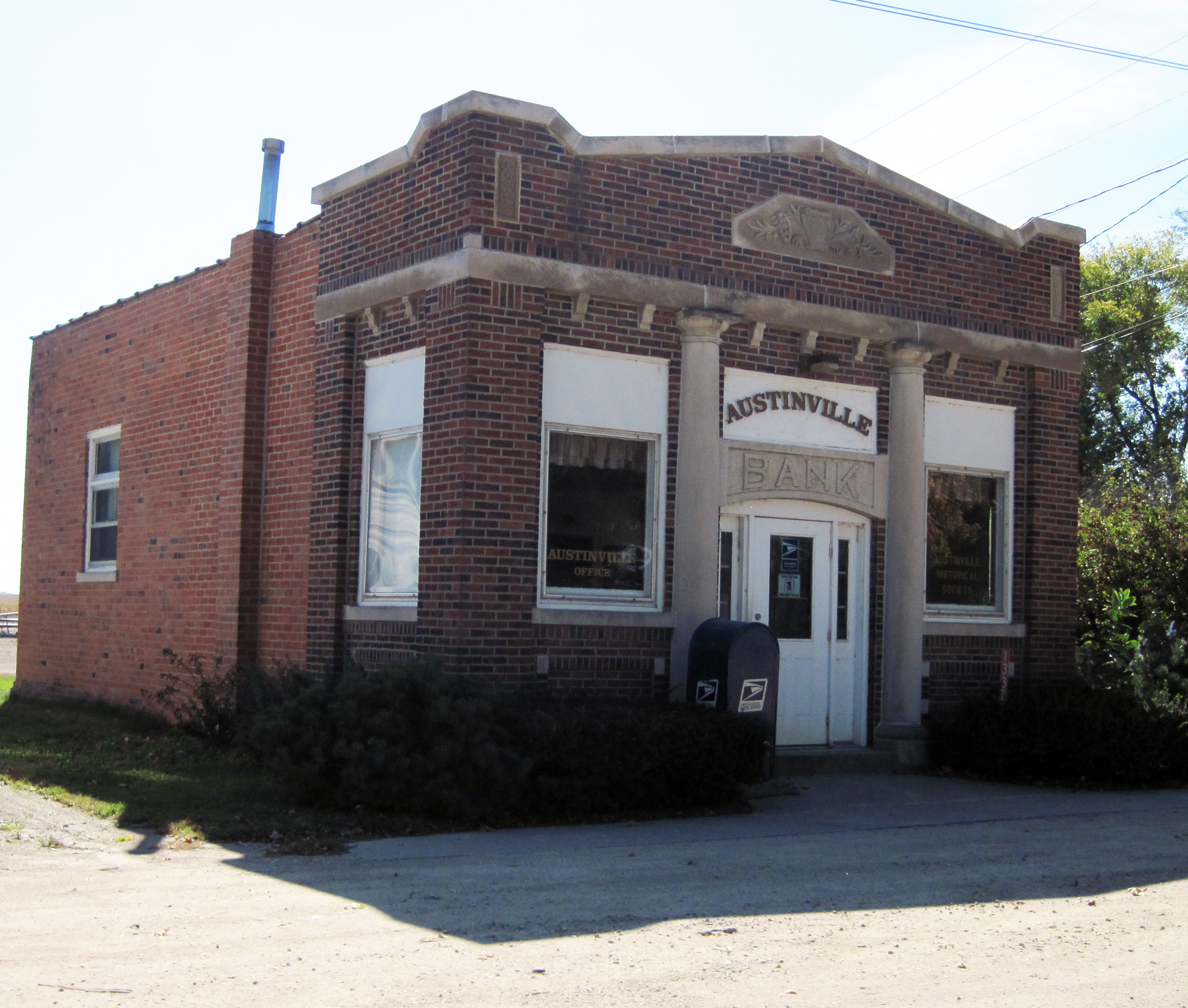
- Austinville Bank

- Location within the state of Iowa Austinville, Iowa (the United States)
- Coordinates: 42°35′09″N 92°57′26″W
- Country: United States
- State: Iowa
- County: Butler
- Elevation: 997 ft (304 m)

Population (2020)
  - Total: 38
- Time zone: UTC-6 (Central (CST))
  - Summer (DST): UTC-5 (CDT)
- ZIP codes: 50608
- GNIS feature ID: 454287

Austinville is an unincorporated community in southwestern Butler County, Iowa, United States. It lies along Iowa Highway 57 southwest of the city of Allison, the county seat of Butler County. Although Austinville is unincorporated, it has a post office with the ZIP code of 50608, which opened on 3 October 1892. As of the United States Census, 2020, the ZIP code's population was 38.

== History ==
Austinville's population was 60 in 1902 and 65 in 1925. The population was 164 in 1940.
