= Jefferson Township, Bremer County, Iowa =

Township in Iowa, US

Jefferson Township, Bremer County
- Township
- Coordinates: 42°41′25″N 092°21′32″W
- Country: United States
- State: Iowa
- County: Bremer

Area
  - Total: 24.36 sq mi (63.09 km^{2})
  - Land: 24.36 sq mi (63.09 km^{2})
  - Water: 0 sq mi (0 km^{2})
- Elevation: 974 ft (297 m)

Population (2010)
  - Total: 3,148
  - Density: 129/sq mi (49.9/km^{2})
- Time zone: UTC-6 (Central)
  - Summer (DST): UTC-5 (Central)
- FIPS code: 19-92205
- GNIS feature ID: 0468129

Jefferson Township is one of fourteen townships in Bremer County, Iowa, USA. At the 2010 census, its population was 3,148.

== Geography ==
Jefferson Township covers an area of 24.36 square miles (63.1 km^{2}) and contains one incorporated settlement, Denver. According to the United States Geological Survey, it contains two cemeteries: Fairview and Jefferson.
