= Chester, Iowa =

- City
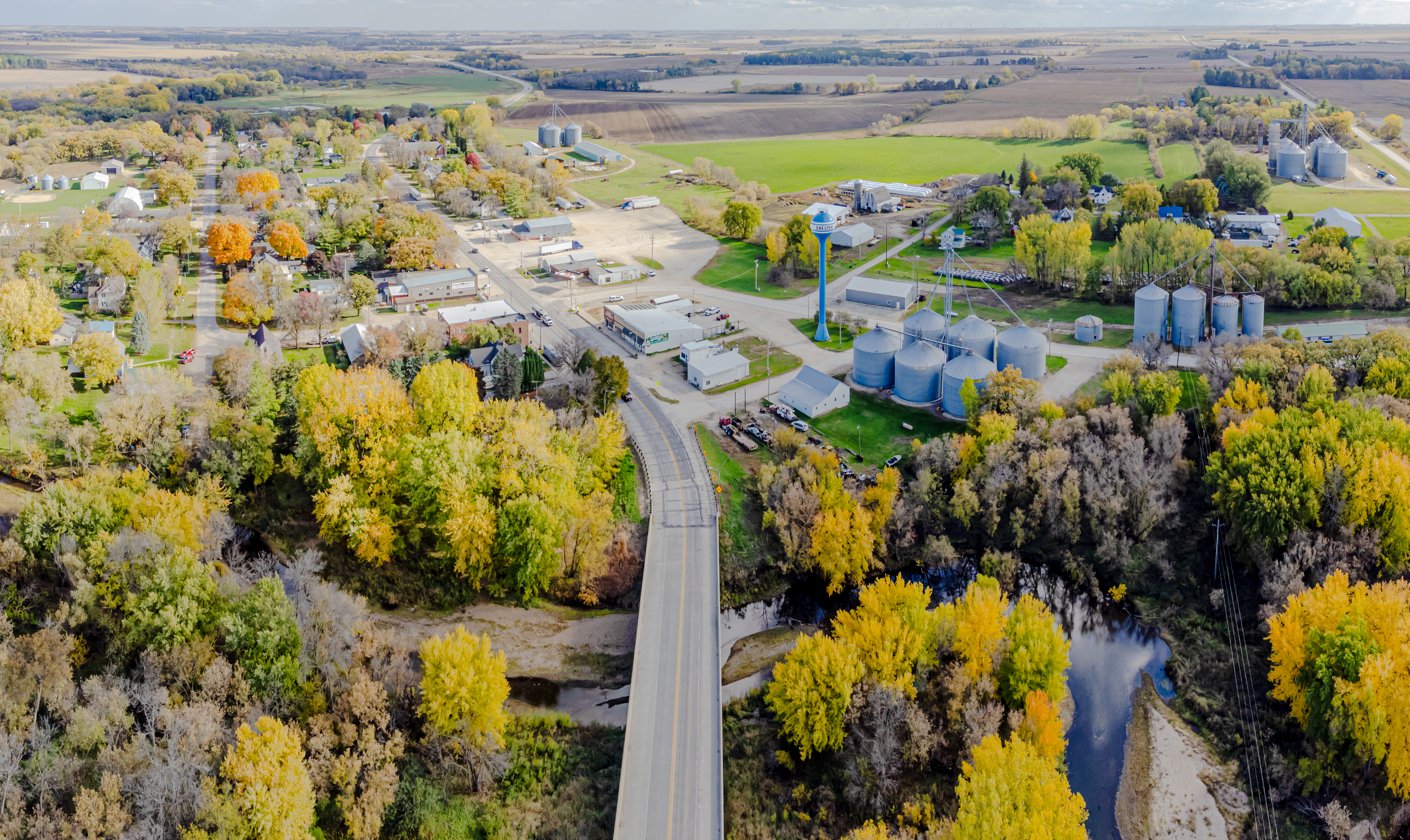
- Aerial view of Chester

- Location of Chester, Iowa
- Coordinates: 43°29′48″N 92°22′15″W !-- Area/postal codes and others -->
- Country: United States
- State: Iowa
- County: Howard
- Incorporated: September 22, 1900

Area
  - Total: 1.38 sq mi (3.58 km^{2})
  - Land: 1.38 sq mi (3.58 km^{2})
  - Water: 0 sq mi (0.00 km^{2})
- Elevation: 1,214 ft (370 m)

Population (2020)
  - Total: 139
  - Density: 100.5/sq mi (38.82/km^{2})
- Time zone: UTC-6 (Central (CST))
  - Summer (DST): UTC-5 (CDT)
- ZIP code: 52134
- Area code: 563
- FIPS code: 19-13125
- GNIS feature ID: 2393820

Chester is a city in Howard County, Iowa, United States. The population was 139 in the 2020 census, a decrease of 7.9% from the 151 population in the 2000 census. Chester is located close to the state line from Minnesota.

== History ==
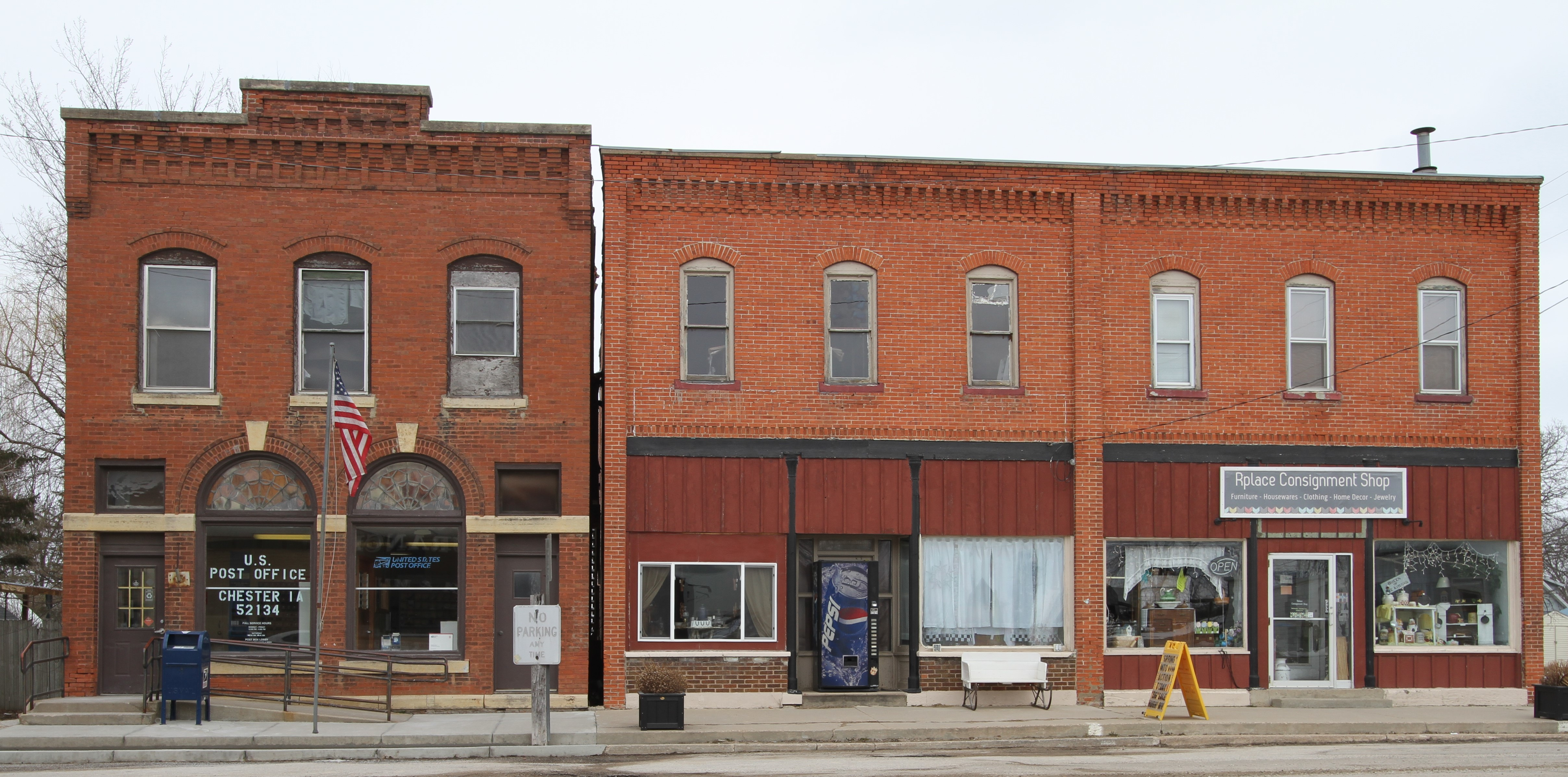
Historic buildings in Chester, including the post office

Chester was laid out in 1858.

== Geography ==
According to the United States Census Bureau, the city has a total area of 1.34 square miles (3.47 km^{2}), all of it land.

== Demographics ==
Historical population
Census	Pop.	Note	%±
1880	101		—
1910	266		—
1920	237		−10.9%
1930	238		0.4%
1940	234		−1.7%
1950	226		−3.4%
1960	211		−6.6%
1970	185		−12.3%
1980	175		−5.4%
1990	158		−9.7%
2000	151		−4.4%
2010	127		−15.9%
2020	139		9.4%
U.S. Decennial Census

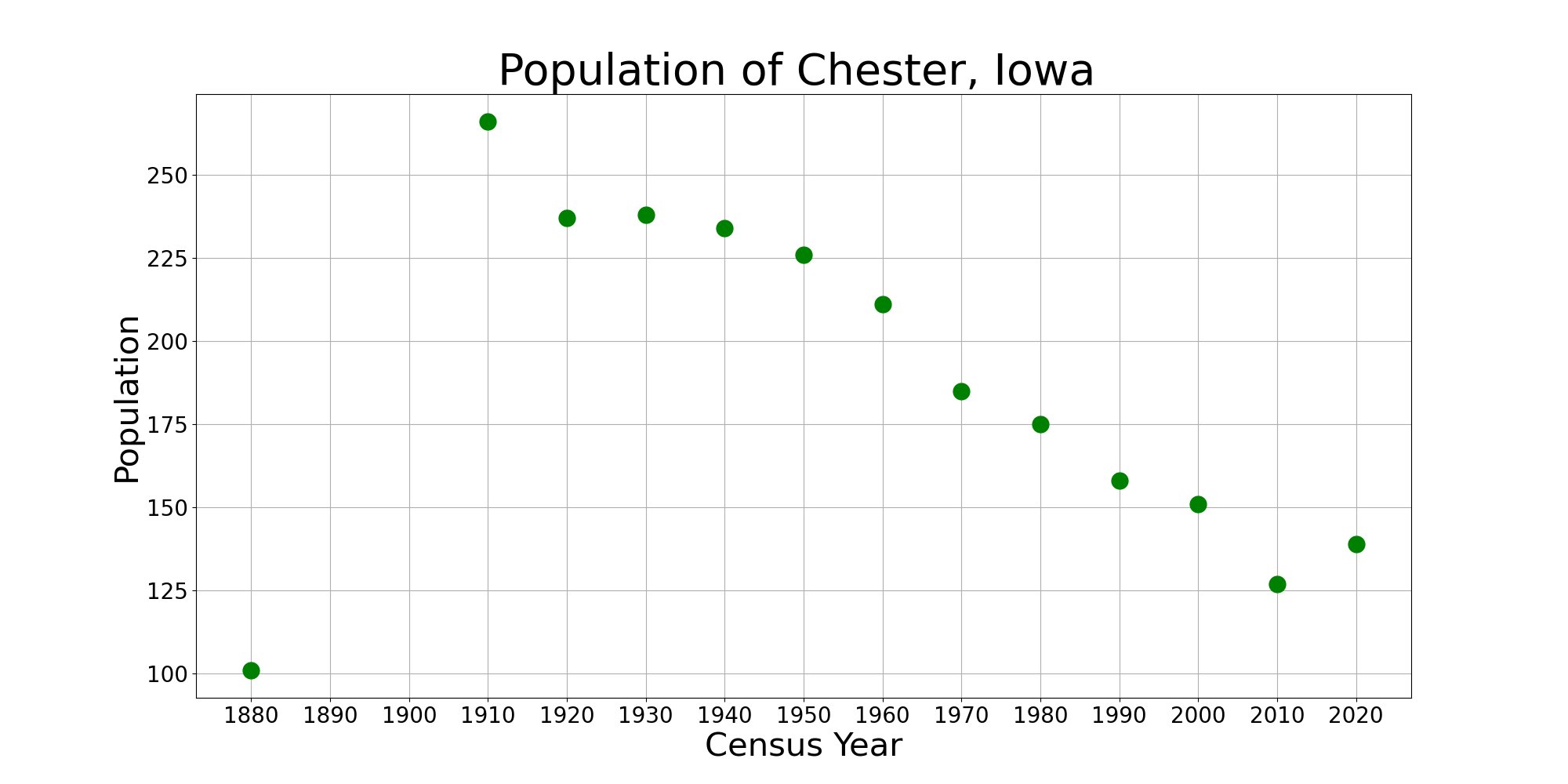
The population of Chester from US census data

=== 2020 census ===
As of the census of 2020, there were 139 people, 63 households, and 39 families residing in the city. The population density was 100.5 inhabitants per square mile (38.8/km^{2}). There were 66 housing units at an average density of 47.7 per square mile (18.4/km^{2}). The racial makeup of the city was 89.2% White, 0.0% Black or African American, 0.7% Native American, 0.0% Asian, 0.0% Pacific Islander, 3.6% from other races and 6.5% from two or more races. Hispanic or Latino persons of any race comprised 8.6% of the population.

Of the 63 households, 31.7% of which had children under the age of 18 living with them, 34.9% were married couples living together, 12.7% were cohabitating couples, 27.0% had a female householder with no spouse or partner present and 25.4% had a male householder with no spouse or partner present. 38.1% of all households were non-families. 34.9% of all households were made up of individuals, 12.7% had someone living alone who was 65 years old or older.

The median age in the city was 38.5 years. 27.3% of the residents were under the age of 20; 3.6% were between the ages of 20 and 24; 28.8% were from 25 and 44; 23.7% were from 45 and 64; and 16.5% were 65 years of age or older. The gender makeup of the city was 52.5% male and 47.5% female.

=== 2010 census ===
As of the census of 2010, there were 127 people, 64 households, and 36 families residing in the city. The population density was 94.8 inhabitants per square mile (36.6/km^{2}). There were 77 housing units at an average density of 57.5 per square mile (22.2/km^{2}). The racial makeup of the city was 99.2% White and 0.8% Native American. Hispanic or Latino of any race were 0.8% of the population.

There were 64 households, of which 17.2% had children under the age of 18 living with them, 42.2% were married couples living together, 4.7% had a female householder with no husband present, 9.4% had a male householder with no wife present, and 43.8% were non-families. 40.6% of all households were made up of individuals, and 21.8% had someone living alone who was 65 years of age or older. The average household size was 1.98 and the average family size was 2.58.

The median age in the city was 48.8 years. 17.3% of residents were under the age of 18; 5.5% were between the ages of 18 and 24; 20.5% were from 25 to 44; 27.5% were from 45 to 64; and 29.1% were 65 years of age or older. The gender makeup of the city was 55.1% male and 44.9% female.

=== 2000 census ===
As of the census of 2000, there were 151 people, 71 households, and 47 families residing in the city. The population density was 113.2 inhabitants per square mile (43.7/km^{2}). There were 82 housing units at an average density of 61.5 per square mile (23.7/km^{2}). The racial makeup of the city was 99.34% White, 0.66% from other races. Hispanic or Latino of any race were 1.32% of the population.

There were 71 households, out of which 22.5% had children under the age of 18 living with them, 56.3% were married couples living together, 8.5% had a female householder with no husband present, and 33.8% were non-families. 31.0% of all households were made up of individuals, and 21.1% had someone living alone who was 65 years of age or older. The average household size was 2.13 and the average family size was 2.64.

In the city, the population was spread out, with 19.2% under the age of 18, 5.3% from 18 to 24, 22.5% from 25 to 44, 24.5% from 45 to 64, and 28.5% who were 65 years of age or older. The median age was 48 years. For every 100 females, there were 81.9 males. For every 100 females age 18 and over, there were 71.8 males.

The median income for a household in the city was $21,875, and the median income for a family was $40,625. Males had a median income of $28,438 versus $21,667 for females. The per capita income for the city was $18,240. There were 4.7% of families and 8.2% of the population living below the poverty line, including 22.2% of under eighteens and none of those over 64.

== Education ==
Howard–Winneshiek Community School District operates public schools. The district was formed from the merger of the Cresco, Lime Springs/Chester, Elma, and Ridgeway school districts, opening on July 1, 1960.

In 2015 the district board voted to close the Lime Springs–Chester Elementary School on a 4–1 basis.

== See also ==
- U.S. Route 63 in Iowa
