= Bank of Sumner =

- U.S. National Register of Historic Places
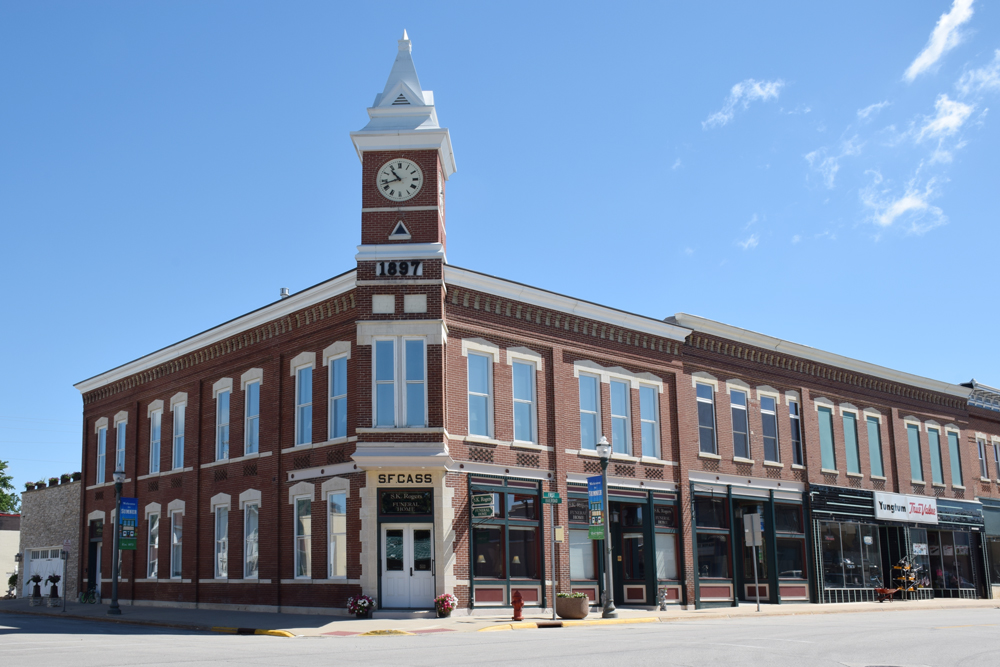

- Location within Iowa Location within the United States
- Location: 118 W. 1st St. Sumner, Iowa
- Coordinates: 42°50′52″N 92°05′56″W
- Built: 1897
- Architectural style: Queen Anne
- NRHP reference No.: 04000900
- Added to NRHP: August 25, 2004

The Bank of Sumner, also known as the Clock Tower building and the S.F. Cass building, is a historic building located in Sumner, Iowa, United States. Stephen F. Cass had established a stagecoach-stop general store two miles northeast of where Chancey Carpenter had platted the town of Sumner. Carpenter had given a strip of land to the Iowa Pacific Rail Company, later the Chicago Great Western Railway, which built their tracks and a depot in town. Cass moved his operations to Sumner, and in 1879 or 1880 went into banking. He built a frame building for his bank at the same location as this building. This building replaced it in 1897, and over the next three years Cass built several other brick commercial buildings on the same block. Cass died in 1900, and the bank failed in 1931 during the Great Depression. The post office moved out in 1933. A bakery occupied the building for several decades.

The two-story brick structure features a corner clock tower, pilasters that divide the slightly inset bays, and a cornice of corbelled bricks. The building was listed on the National Register of Historic Places in 2004.
