= Iowa Highway 57 =

State highway in Iowa, United States

Iowa Highway 57
- Iowa 57 highlighted in red

Route information
- Maintained by Iowa DOT
- Length: 43.765 mi (70.433 km)

Major junctions
- West end: US 65 / CR S45 near Iowa Falls
- Iowa 14 at Parkersburg
- East end: US 218 / Iowa 27 / Iowa 58 at Cedar Falls

Location
- Country: United States
- State: Iowa
- Counties: Hardin; Franklin; Butler; Grundy; Black Hawk

Highway system
- Iowa Primary Highway System; Interstate; US; State; Secondary; Scenic
← Iowa 56	→ Iowa 58

Iowa Highway 57 is a state highway that runs from west to east in northern Iowa. Its western terminus is at U.S. Route 65 northeast of Iowa Falls. Its eastern terminus is at an intersection with U.S. Highway 218, Iowa Highway 27, and Iowa Highway 58 in Cedar Falls. It currently follows much of U.S. Highway 20's old route from Cedar Falls to Iowa Falls.

== Route description ==
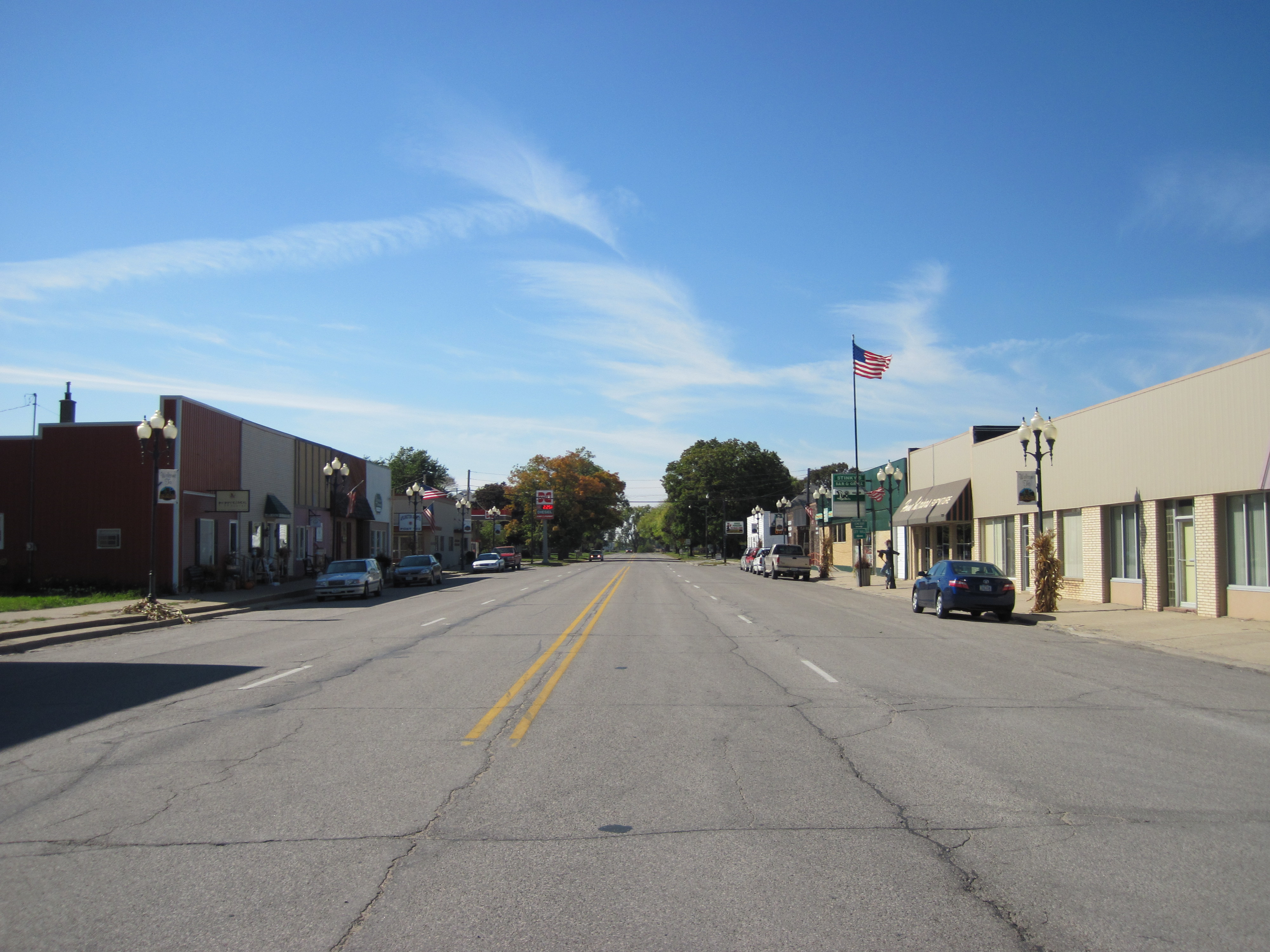
Iowa 57 in Aplington

Iowa Highway 57 begins at US 65 northeast of Iowa Falls and runs eastward along the Hardin County/Franklin County border. It goes through Ackley, then turns north shortly to go through Austinville. It turns eastward there and runs through Aplington before meeting Iowa 14 in Parkersburg. It continues east through New Hartford, then after a brief south turn, turns east to go through Cedar Falls. In the eastern part of Cedar Falls, near George Wyth Memorial State Park, Iowa Highway 57 ends when it meets US 218, Iowa 27, and Iowa 58.

== History ==
At the time of designation, the highway went from Grundy Center northward to Cedar Falls. In August 1932, the segment from Grundy Center to Parkersburg was renumbered as Iowa 14. In 1986, when U.S. Highway 20 was expanded to four lanes to the Black Hawk/Grundy County line, Iowa 57 assumed 20's old route from Cedar Falls to Parkersburg. When the final four lane segment of U.S. 20 through the Iowa River Greenbelt opened on August 22, 2003, Iowa 57 was extended to cover the remainder of U.S. 20's old route to U.S. 65.

== Major intersections ==
County	Location	mi	km	Destinations	Notes
Hardin–Franklin county line	Hardin–Grant township line	0.000	0.000	US 65 / CR S45 – Iowa Falls, Hampton	
Butler	Parkersburg	23.100	37.176	Iowa 14 north – Allison	Western end of Iowa 14 overlap
Butler	Parkersburg	24.522	39.464	Iowa 14 south – Grundy Center	Eastern end of Iowa 14 overlap
Grundy	No major junctions				
Black Hawk	Cedar Falls	43.765	70.433	US 218 / Iowa 27 / Iowa 58 south – Waterloo, Waverly	
1.000 mi = 1.609 km; 1.000 km = 0.621 mi: Concurrency terminus
