= Richland Township, Wapello County, Iowa =

Township in Wapello County, Iowa, U.S.

Coordinates: 41.119°N 92.467°W

Richland Township is a township in Wapello County, Iowa, United States.

== History ==
Richland Township was organized in 1844.
