= Hudson, Iowa =

- City
- Location of Hudson, Iowa
- Coordinates: 42°25′55″N 92°27′08″W
- Country: US
- State: Iowa
- County: Black Hawk

Area
  - Total: 8.49 sq mi (21.98 km^{2})
  - Land: 8.41 sq mi (21.79 km^{2})
  - Water: 0.069 sq mi (0.18 km^{2})
- Elevation: 873 ft (266 m)

Population (2020)
  - Total: 2,546
  - Density: 302.6/sq mi (116.83/km^{2})
- Time zone: UTC-6 (Central (CST))
  - Summer (DST): UTC-5 (CDT)
- ZIP code: 50643
- Area code: 319
- FIPS code: 19-37470
- GNIS feature ID: 2394438
- Website: www.cityofhudsonia.com

Hudson is a city in Black Hawk County, Iowa, United States. The population was 2,546 at the time of the 2020 census. The rural community of Hudson has grown in recent years and is included as a part of the Waterloo-Cedar Falls Metropolitan Statistical Area.

== History ==
Hudson was platted in 1857.

== Geography ==
U.S. Route 63 and Iowa Highway 58 meet just south of Hudson's center. U.S. Route 20 follows a path north of the town.

According to the United States Census Bureau, the city has a total area of 8.47 square miles (21.94 km^{2}), of which 8.40 square miles (21.76 km^{2}) is land and 0.07 square miles (0.18 km^{2}) is water.

== Demographics ==
Historical populations
Year	Pop.	±%
1880	52	—
1890	199	+282.7%
1900	359	+80.4%
1910	372	+3.6%
1920	408	+9.7%
1930	470	+15.2%
1940	492	+4.7%
1950	613	+24.6%
1960	1,085	+77.0%
1970	1,535	+41.5%
1980	2,267	+47.7%
1990	2,037	−10.1%
2000	2,117	+3.9%
2010	2,282	+7.8%
2020	2,546	+11.6%
Source:"U.S. Census website". United States Census Bureau. and Iowa Data Center; Source: U.S. Decennial Census

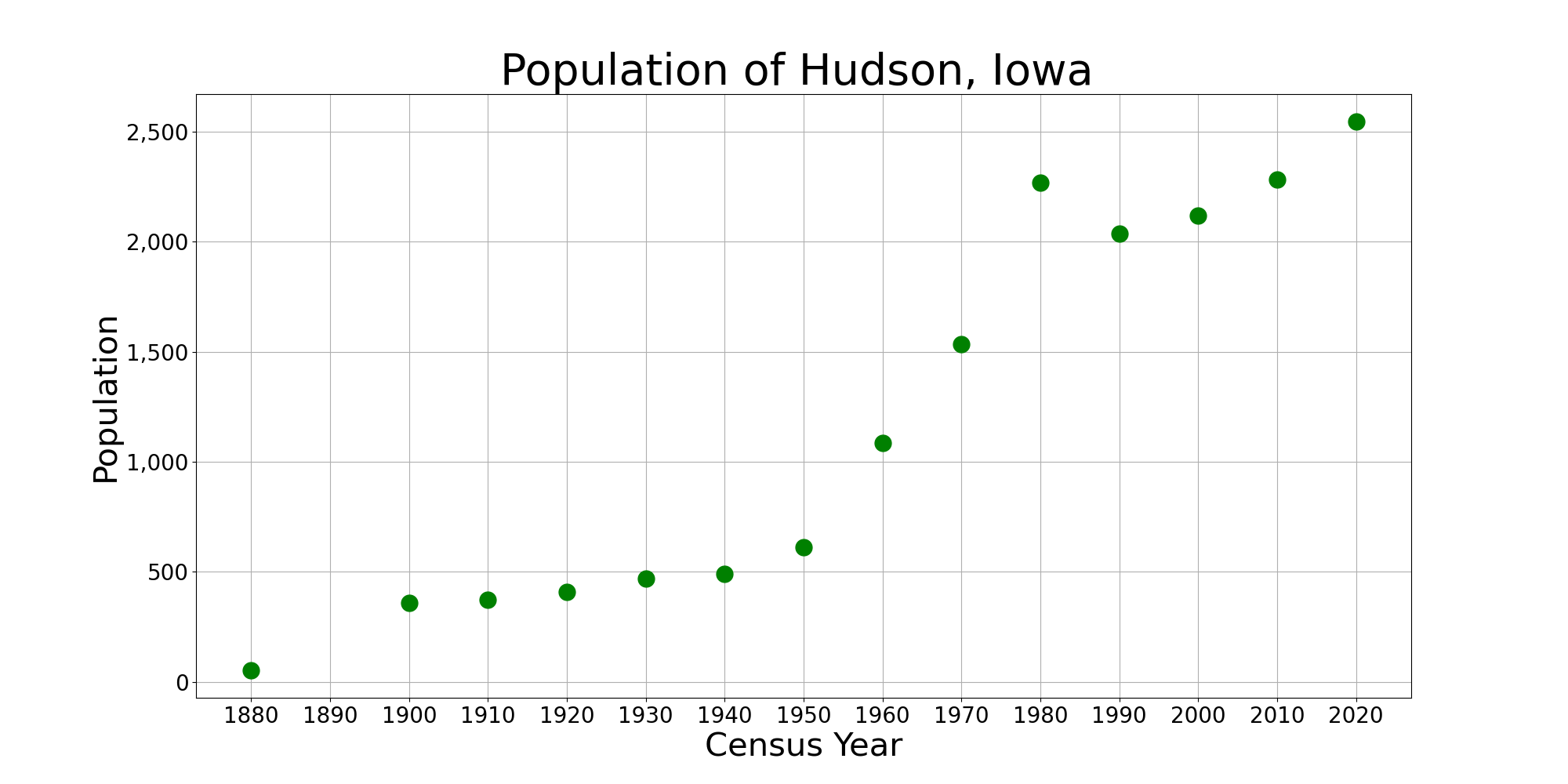
The population of Hudson, Iowa from US census data

=== 2020 census ===
As of the 2020 census, Hudson had a population of 2,546, with 982 households and 737 families residing in the city. The population density was 302.6 inhabitants per square mile (116.8/km^{2}). The median age was 40.3 years. 26.4% of residents were under the age of 18 and 17.2% were 65 years of age or older. 28.2% of residents were under the age of 20; 3.8% were between the ages of 20 and 24; 24.8% were from 25 to 44; and 26.0% were from 45 to 64. The gender makeup of the city was 49.7% male and 50.3% female. For every 100 females there were 98.9 males, and for every 100 females age 18 and over there were 98.6 males age 18 and over.

85.0% of residents lived in urban areas, while 15.0% lived in rural areas.

Of the 982 households, 34.8% had children under the age of 18 living in them. 65.0% were married-couple households, 3.8% were cohabiting-couple households, 14.1% had a male householder with no spouse or partner present, and 17.2% had a female householder with no spouse or partner present. 24.9% of all households were non-families, 21.5% were made up of individuals, and 10.0% had someone living alone who was 65 years of age or older.

There were 1,035 housing units at an average density of 123.0 per square mile (47.5/km^{2}). Of all housing units, 5.1% were vacant. The homeowner vacancy rate was 0.9% and the rental vacancy rate was 10.7%.

Racial composition as of the 2020 census
Race	Number	Percent
White	2,395	94.1%
Black or African American	20	0.8%
American Indian and Alaska Native	2	0.1%
Asian	17	0.7%
Native Hawaiian and Other Pacific Islander	0	0.0%
Some other race	14	0.5%
Two or more races	98	3.8%
Hispanic or Latino (of any race)	66	2.6%

=== 2010 census ===
As of the census of 2010, there were 2,282 people, 878 households, and 688 families living in the city. The population density was 271.7 inhabitants per square mile (104.9/km^{2}). There were 931 housing units at an average density of 110.8 per square mile (42.8/km^{2}). The racial makeup of the city was 98.1% White, 0.3% African American, 0.5% Asian, 0.7% from other races, and 0.4% from two or more races. Hispanic or Latino of any race were 1.6% of the population.

There were 878 households, of which 35.5% had children under the age of 18 living with them, 68.2% were married couples living together, 6.8% had a female householder with no husband present, 3.3% had a male householder with no wife present, and 21.6% were non-families. 18.5% of all households were made up of individuals, and 7.9% had someone living alone who was 65 years of age or older. The average household size was 2.60 and the average family size was 2.94.

The median age in the city was 41.7 years. 26.1% of residents were under the age of 18; 5.9% were between the ages of 18 and 24; 23.5% were from 25 to 44; 30.3% were from 45 to 64; and 14.4% were 65 years of age or older. The gender makeup of the city was 49.3% male and 50.7% female.

=== 2000 census ===
As of the census of 2000, there were 2,117 people, 787 households, and 613 families living in the city. The population density was 274.9 inhabitants per square mile (106.1/km^{2}). There were 815 housing units at an average density of 105.8 per square mile (40.8/km^{2}). The racial makeup of the city was 98.49% White, 0.19% African American, 0.43% Asian, 0.66% from other races, and 0.24% from two or more races. Hispanic or Latino of any race were 0.71% of the population.

There were 787 households, out of which 39.5% had children under the age of 18 living with them, 69.6% were married couples living together, 6.2% had a female householder with no husband present, and 22.1% were non-families. 19.2% of all households were made up of individuals, and 9.7% had someone living alone who was 65 years of age or older. The average household size was 2.69 and the average family size was 3.10.

Age spread: 28.9% under the age of 18, 6.8% from 18 to 24, 26.6% from 25 to 44, 26.2% from 45 to 64, and 11.4% who were 65 years of age or older. The median age was 38 years. For every 100 females, there were 93.5 males. For every 100 females age 18 and over, there were 92.6 males.

The median income for a household in the city was $56,065, and the median income for a family was $64,737. Males had a median income of $41,576 versus $26,667 for females. The per capita income for the city was $24,101. About 1.9% of families and 3.3% of the population were below the poverty line, including 5.1% of those under age 18 and 3.3% of those age 65 or over.
