= Crystal Township, Tama County, Iowa =

Township in Tama County, Iowa, U.S.

Coordinates: 42.170185°N 92.578897°W

Location of Crystal Township in Tama County

Crystal Township is one of the twenty-one townships of Tama County, Iowa, United States.

== History ==
Crystal Township was established in 1857. It was named for the "crystalline purity" of their air. Crystal Township's post office was established in 1868. Early settlers came from Ayrshire, Scotland and focused on raising livestock in this agriculturally-centered town.

The Presbyterian Church of Crystal Township was the first of that denomination in the County, and was organized in 1850. By 1868 Crystal Township had a general store, a shoe shop, a blacksmith, and a schoolhouse.
