= Denver, Iowa =

- City
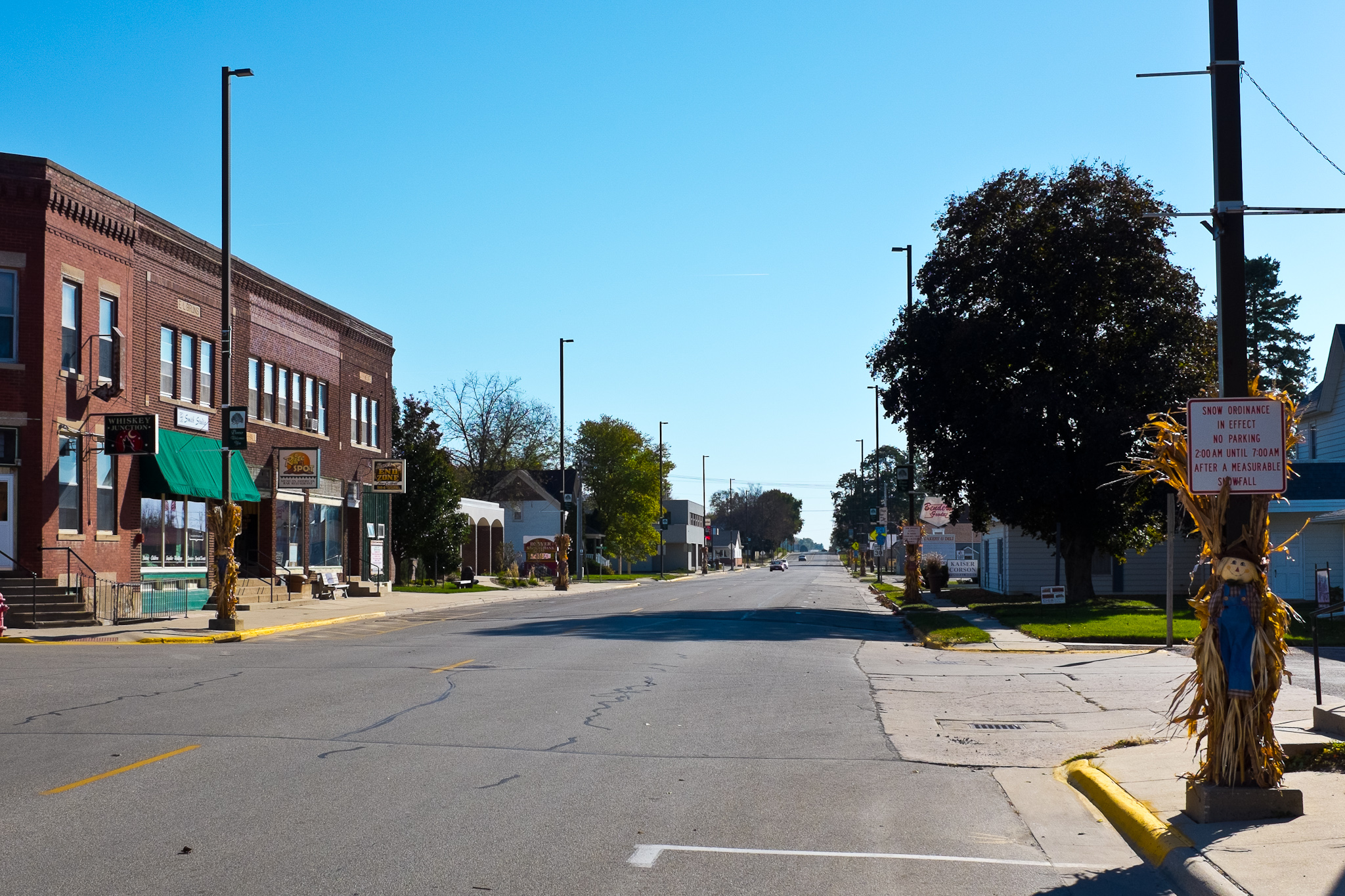
- Downtown Denver
- Motto: "The Mile Wide City"
- Location of Denver, Iowa
- Coordinates: 42°40′06″N 92°20′06″W
- Country: United States
- State: Iowa
- County: Bremer

Area
  - Total: 1.71 sq mi (4.43 km^{2})
  - Land: 1.69 sq mi (4.39 km^{2})
  - Water: 0.015 sq mi (0.04 km^{2})
- Elevation: 974 ft (297 m)

Population (2020)
  - Total: 1,919
  - Density: 1,131.3/sq mi (436.78/km^{2})
- Time zone: UTC-6 (Central (CST))
  - Summer (DST): UTC-5 (CDT)
- ZIP code: 50622
- Area code: 319
- FIPS code: 19-20035
- GNIS feature ID: 2394519
- Website: The City of Denver, Iowa Website

Denver is a city in Bremer County in the U.S. state of Iowa. The population was 1,919 at the time of the 2020 census. It is part of the Waterloo–Cedar Falls Metropolitan Statistical Area.

== History ==
Denver was originally called Jefferson City, but after the Star Mail Route, a mail service provided to towns having no federal service, was established, the town changed its name. When a federal post office was established in 1863, the name was changed to Denver. The community was incorporated on June 30, 1896.

== Geography ==
Denver is located at 42°40′19″N 92°20′1″W (42.672070, −92.333604).

According to the United States Census Bureau, the city has a total area of 1.65 square miles (4.27 km^{2}), of which 1.64 square miles (4.25 km^{2}) is land and 0.01 square miles (0.03 km^{2}) is water.

== Demographics ==
Historical populations
Year	Pop.	±%
1900	102	—
1910	224	+119.6%
1920	462	+106.2%
1930	500	+8.2%
1940	556	+11.2%
1950	635	+14.2%
1960	831	+30.9%
1970	1,169	+40.7%
1980	1,647	+40.9%
1990	1,600	−2.9%
2000	1,627	+1.7%
2010	1,780	+9.4%
2020	1,919	+7.8%
Source:"U.S. Census website". United States Census Bureau. and Iowa Data Center; Source: U.S. Decennial Census

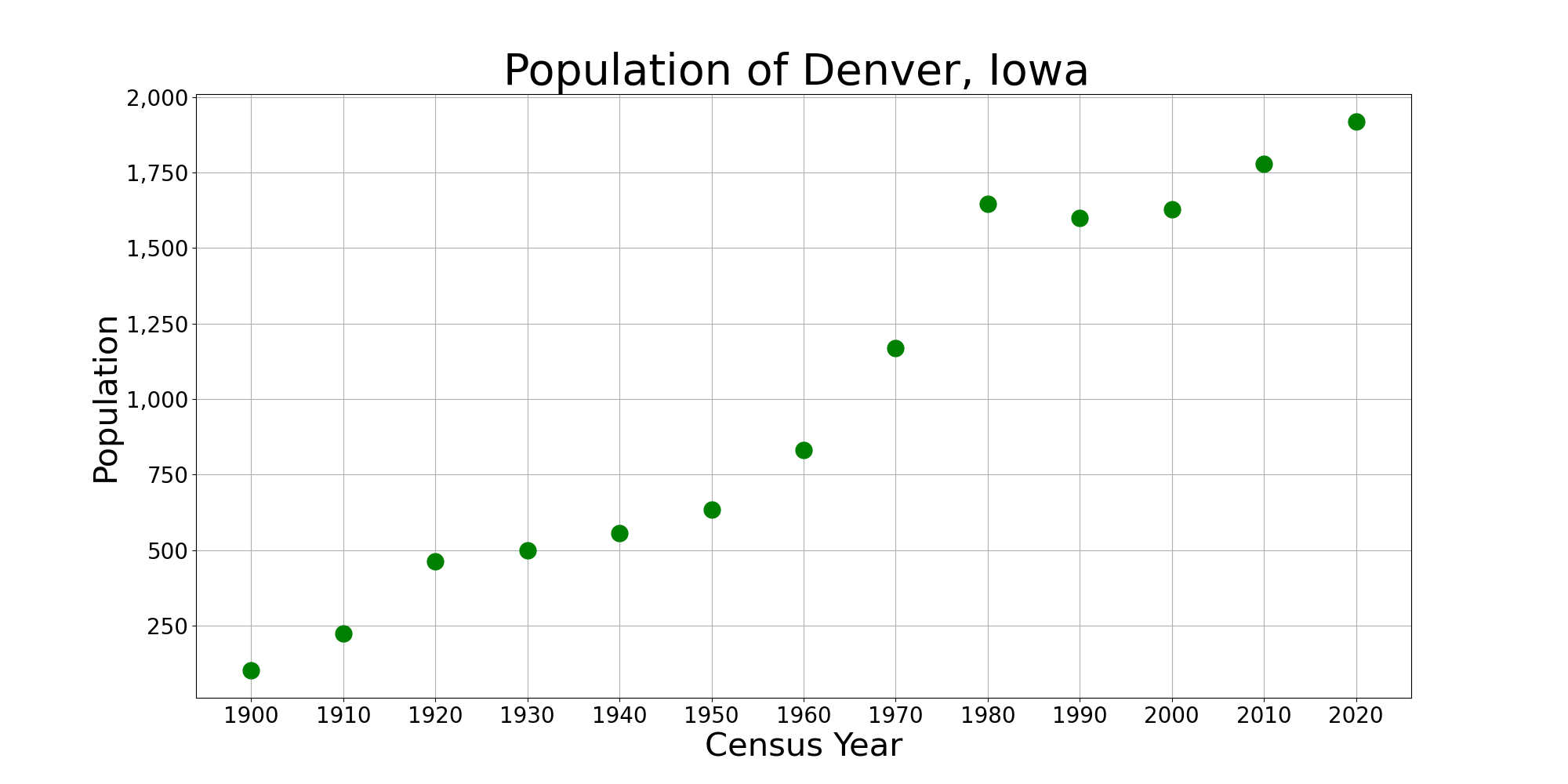
The population of Denver, Iowa from US census data

=== 2020 census ===
As of the 2020 census, Denver had a population of 1,919, with 751 households and 514 families residing in the city.

The population density was 1,131.2 inhabitants per square mile (436.8/km^{2}). There were 805 housing units at an average density of 474.5 per square mile (183.2/km^{2}), of which 6.7% were vacant. The homeowner vacancy rate was 1.3% and the rental vacancy rate was 11.9%.

The median age was 38.4 years. 27.6% of residents were under the age of 18, 29.6% were under the age of 20, and 21.4% were 65 years of age or older; 4.2% were between the ages of 20 and 24, 24.8% were from 25 to 44, and 20.1% were from 45 to 64. For every 100 females there were 91.3 males, and for every 100 females age 18 and over there were 86.3 males age 18 and over. Overall, the city's population was 47.7% male and 52.3% female.

Of the 751 households, 34.9% had children under the age of 18 living in them. Of all households, 55.1% were married-couple households, 6.3% were cohabitating-couple households, 13.0% had a male householder with no spouse or partner present, and 25.6% had a female householder with no spouse or partner present. About 31.6% of households were non-families, 26.5% of all households were made up of individuals, and 13.6% had someone living alone who was 65 years of age or older.

0.0% of residents lived in urban areas, while 100.0% lived in rural areas.

Racial composition as of the 2020 census
Race	Number	Percent
White	1,845	96.1%
Black or African American	0	0.0%
American Indian and Alaska Native	1	0.1%
Asian	6	0.3%
Native Hawaiian and Other Pacific Islander	0	0.0%
Some other race	9	0.5%
Two or more races	58	3.0%
Hispanic or Latino (of any race)	25	1.3%

=== 2010 census ===
As of the census of 2010, there were 1,780 people, 701 households, and 504 families living in the city. The population density was 1,085.4 inhabitants per square mile (419.1/km^{2}). There were 731 housing units at an average density of 445.7 per square mile (172.1/km^{2}). The racial makeup of the city was 98.8% White, 0.1% African American, 0.1% Native American, 0.3% Asian, 0.3% from other races, and 0.4% from two or more races. Hispanic or Latino of any race were 0.6% of the population.

There were 701 households, of which 34.5% had children under the age of 18 living with them, 62.2% were married couples living together, 7.3% had a female householder with no husband present, 2.4% had a male householder with no wife present, and 28.1% were non-families. 23.8% of all households were made up of individuals, and 12.9% had someone living alone who was 65 years of age or older. The average household size was 2.50 and the average family size was 2.97.

The median age in the city was 38.5 years. 26.5% of residents were under the age of 18; 6.9% were between the ages of 18 and 24; 25.8% were from 25 to 44; 24.1% were from 45 to 64; and 16.7% were 65 years of age or older. The gender makeup of the city was 47.6% male and 52.4% female.

=== 2000 census ===
As of the census of 2000, there were 1,627 people, 648 households, and 476 families living in the city. The population density was 1,177.9 inhabitants per square mile (454.8/km^{2}). There were 672 housing units at an average density of 486.5 per square mile (187.8/km^{2}). The racial makeup of the city was 98.52% White, 0.18% African American, 0.18% Asian, 0.37% from other races, and 0.74% from two or more races. Hispanic or Latino of any race were 0.92% of the population.

There were 648 households, out of which 36.4% had children under the age of 18 living with them, 62.8% were married couples living together, 9.3% had a female householder with no husband present, and 26.4% were non-families. 24.4% of all households were made up of individuals, and 14.7% had someone living alone who was 65 years of age or older. The average household size was 2.46 and the average family size was 2.93.

26.4% were under the age of 18, 6.0% from 18 to 24, 25.9% from 25 to 44, 25.0% from 45 to 64, and 16.7% were 65 years of age or older. The median age was 40 years. For every 100 females, there were 89.6 males. For every 100 females age 18 and over, there were 81.5 males.

The median income for a household in the city was $44,375, and the median income for a family was $53,958. Males had a median income of $41,731 versus $24,830 for females. The per capita income for the city was $20,791. About 2.1% of families and 2.4% of the population were below the poverty line, including 0.9% of those under age 18 and 3.9% of those age 65 or over.

== Education ==
The city of Denver is served by the Denver Community School District.
