= Iowa Highway 137 =

State highway in Iowa, United States

Iowa Highway 137
- Iowa 137 highlighted in red

Route information
- Maintained by Iowa DOT
- Length: 14.526 mi (23.377 km)
- Existed: 1934–present

Major junctions
- South end: Iowa 5 in Albia
- North end: US 63 / Iowa 163 in Eddyville

Location
- Country: United States
- State: Iowa
- Counties: Monroe; Wapello

Highway system
- Iowa Primary Highway System; Interstate; US; State; Secondary; Scenic
← Iowa 136	→ Iowa 139

Iowa Highway 137 (Iowa 137) is a 14 1/2-mile-long (23.3 km) state highway in southern Iowa. The route begins at Iowa 5 in Albia and ends at U.S. Highway 63 (US 63) and Iowa 163 in Eddyville. The highway was designated in the 1930s after US 63 was rerouted.

== Route description ==
Iowa 137 begins at a Y intersection with Iowa 5 on the north side of Albia. From Albia, it travels north for four miles (6.4 km) before turning northeast towards Eddyville. Just one-half mile (0.80 km) south of Eddyville, the highway crosses the Des Moines River. The highway ends at an interchange with US 63 and Iowa 163 on Eddyville's southeast corner.

== History ==
Iowa 137 was designated in 1934 to replace a segment of Iowa 59 that was not subsumed into US 63. Previously, US 63's northern end was in Des Moines, but it was shifted that year to follow Iowa 59 north of Oskaloosa. For 63 years, the route of Iowa 137 remained largely unchanged; it ran for 25 miles (40 km) between Albia and Oskaloosa. In 1997, US 63 was again rerouted, this time onto a new four-lane highway, between Ottumwa and Oskaloosa. The new US 63 highway was built along Iowa 137 and Iowa 23, north and south of Eddyville, respectively. Iowa 137 was truncated to its current extent when the expressway opened on July 16, 1997.

== Major intersections ==
County	Location	mi	km	Destinations	Notes
Monroe	Albia	0.000	0.000	Iowa 5 – Centerville, Knoxville	
Wapello	Eddyville	14.526	23.377	US 63 / Iowa 163 – Oskaloosa, Ottumwa	
1.000 mi = 1.609 km; 1.000 km = 0.621 mi
