= Fremont Township, Fayette County, Iowa =

Fremont Township
- Township
- Location in Fayette County
- Coordinates: 42°46′27″N 92°01′11″W
- Country: United States
- State: Iowa
- County: Fayette

Area
  - Total: 37.03 sq mi (95.92 km^{2})
  - Land: 37.03 sq mi (95.92 km^{2})
  - Water: 0 sq mi (0 km^{2}) 0%
- Elevation: 1,079 ft (329 m)

Population (2010)
  - Total: 560
  - Density: 15/sq mi (5.8/km^{2})
- Time zone: UTC-6 (CST)
  - Summer (DST): UTC-5 (CDT)
- ZIP codes: 50629, 50655, 50662, 50674, 50681
- GNIS feature ID: 0467878

Fremont Township is one of twenty townships in Fayette County, Iowa, United States. As of the 2010 census, its population was 560.

== Geography ==
According to the United States Census Bureau, Fremont Township covers an area of 37.03 square miles (95.92 square kilometers).

=== Cities, towns, villages ===
- Westgate

=== Adjacent townships ===
- Banks Township (north)
- Center Township (northeast)
- Harlan Township (east)
- Jefferson Township (southeast)
- Oran Township (south)
- Franklin Township, Bremer County (southwest)
- Dayton Township, Bremer County (west)
- Sumner No. 2 Township, Bremer County (northwest)

=== Cemeteries ===
The township contains these three cemeteries: Calvary, Greenwood and Saint Peter.

=== Landmarks ===
- Downing County Park

== School districts ==
- Sumner-Fredericksburg Community School District
- Wapsie Valley Community School District
- West Central Community School District

== Political districts ==
- Iowa's 1st congressional district
- State House District 18
- State Senate District 9
