= Banks Township, Fayette County, Iowa =

Banks Township
- Township
- Location in Fayette County
- Coordinates: 42°51′52″N 92°01′31″W
- Country: United States
- State: Iowa
- County: Fayette

Area
  - Total: 36.53 sq mi (94.61 km^{2})
  - Land: 36.53 sq mi (94.61 km^{2})
  - Water: 0 sq mi (0 km^{2}) 0%
- Elevation: 1,132 ft (345 m)

Population (2010)
  - Total: 326
  - Density: 8.92/sq mi (3.45/km^{2})
- Time zone: UTC-6 (CST)
  - Summer (DST): UTC-5 (CDT)
- ZIP codes: 50674, 52147
- GNIS feature ID: 0467412

Banks Township is one of twenty townships in Fayette County, Iowa, United States. As of the 2010 census, its population was 326.

== Geography ==
According to the United States Census Bureau, Banks Township covers an area of 36.53 square miles (94.61 square kilometers).

The east edge of the city of Sumner extends into this township but is a separate entity.

=== Adjacent townships ===
- Bethel Township (north)
- Windsor Township (northeast)
- Center Township (east)
- Harlan Township (southeast)
- Fremont Township (south)
- Dayton Township, Bremer County (southwest)
- Sumner No. 2 Township, Bremer County (west)
- Sumner Township, Bremer County (west)
- Sumner Township (west)
- Fredericksburg Township, Chickasaw County (northwest)

=== Cemeteries ===
The township contains Union Evangelical Cemetery.

=== Major highways ===
- Iowa Highway 93

== School districts ==
- North Fayette Valley Community School District
- Sumner-Fredericksburg Community School District
- West Central Community School District

== Political districts ==
- Iowa's 1st congressional district
- State House District 18
- State Senate District 9
