= Oran Township, Fayette County, Iowa =

Oran Township
- Township
- Location in Fayette County
- Coordinates: 42°41′05″N 92°01′27″W
- Country: United States
- State: Iowa
- County: Fayette

Area
  - Total: 36.66 sq mi (94.94 km^{2})
  - Land: 36.64 sq mi (94.91 km^{2})
  - Water: 0.012 sq mi (0.03 km^{2}) 0.03%
- Elevation: 1,027 ft (313 m)

Population (2010)
  - Total: 760
  - Density: 21/sq mi (8.0/km^{2})
- Time zone: UTC-6 (CST)
  - Summer (DST): UTC-5 (CDT)
- ZIP codes: 50629, 50662
- GNIS feature ID: 0468467

Oran Township is one of twenty townships in Fayette County, Iowa, United States. As of the 2010 census, its population was 760.

== Geography ==
According to the United States Census Bureau, Oran Township covers an area of 36.66 square miles (94.94 square kilometers); of this, 36.65 square miles (94.91 square kilometers, 99.97 percent) is land and 0.01 square miles (0.03 square kilometers, 0.03 percent) is water.

=== Cities, towns, villages ===
- Fairbank (partial)

=== Unincorporated towns ===
- Oran at 42.701372°N 92.074620°W

(This list is based on USGS data and may include former settlements.)

=== Adjacent townships ===
- Fremont Township (north)
- Harlan Township (northeast)
- Jefferson Township (east)
- Hazleton Township, Buchanan County (southeast)
- Fairbank Township, Buchanan County (south)
- Lester Township, Black Hawk County (southwest)
- Franklin Township, Bremer County (west)
- Dayton Township, Bremer County (northwest)

=== Cemeteries ===
The township contains these four cemeteries: Fairbank, Immaculate Conception, Oran Township and Oran Township.

=== Major highways ===
- Iowa Highway 3

=== Airports and landing strips ===
- Oelwein Municipal Airport

== School districts ==
- Oelwein Community School District
- Wapsie Valley Community School District
- West Central Community School District

== Political districts ==
- Iowa's 1st congressional district
- State House District 18
- State House District 23
- State Senate District 12
- State Senate District 9
