= Fredericksburg, Iowa =

- City
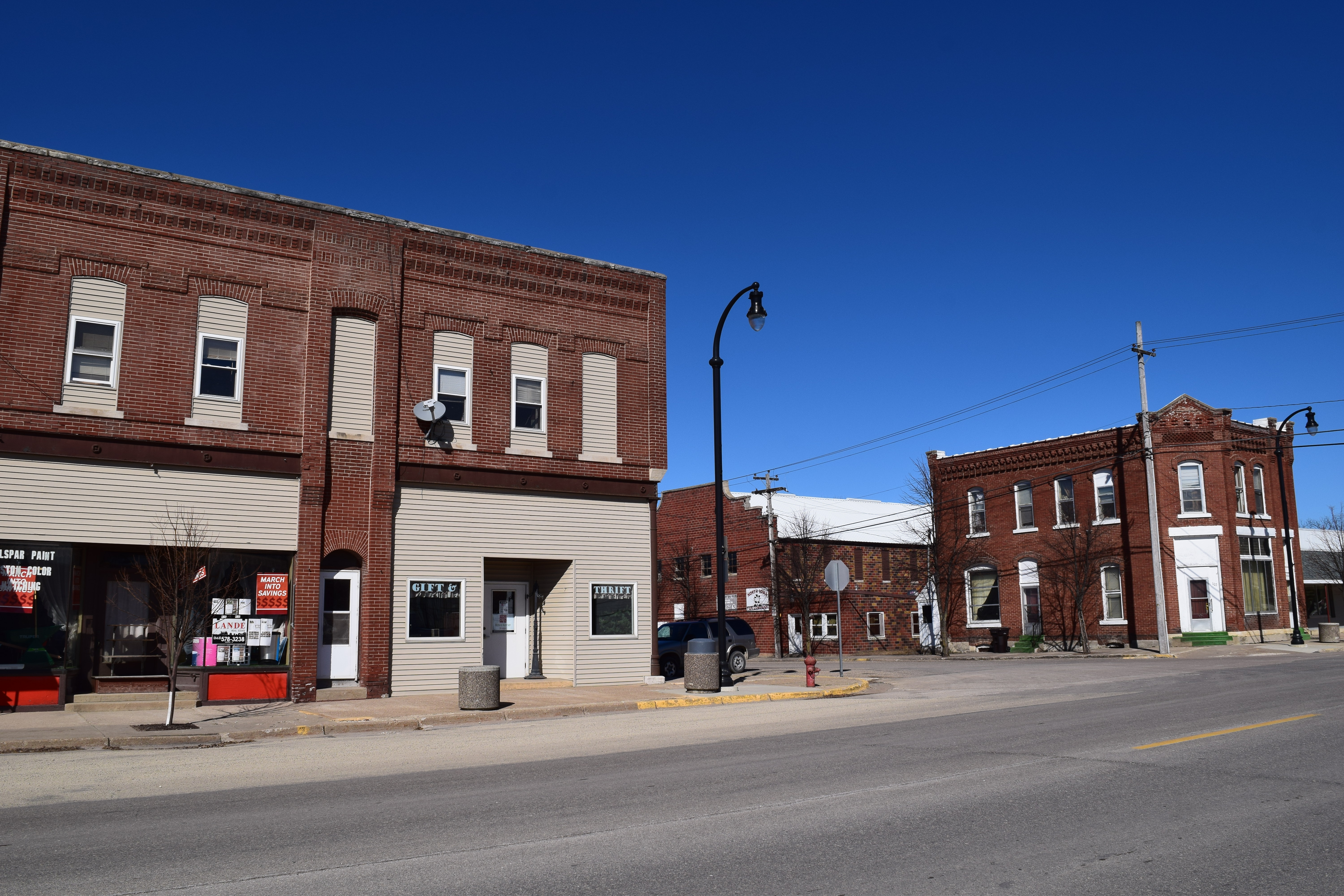
- Downtown Fredericksburg
- Nickname: Dairy Capital of Iowa
- Motto(s): "A Place to Visit, to Live and to Call Home"
- Location of Fredericksburg, Iowa
- Coordinates: 42°57′53″N 92°11′47″W
- Country: USA
- State: Iowa
- County: Chickasaw

Area
  - Total: 0.90 sq mi (2.33 km^{2})
  - Land: 0.90 sq mi (2.33 km^{2})
  - Water: 0 sq mi (0.00 km^{2})
- Elevation: 1,086 ft (331 m)

Population (2020)
  - Total: 987
  - Density: 1,097.1/sq mi (423.59/km^{2})
- Time zone: UTC-6 (Central (CST))
  - Summer (DST): UTC-5 (CDT)
- ZIP code: 50630
- Area code: 563
- FIPS code: 19-28965
- GNIS feature ID: 2394815
- Website: Fredericksburg, Iowa Website

Fredericksburg is a city in Chickasaw County, Iowa, United States. The population was 987 at the time of the 2020 census.

== History ==
Fredericksburg was incorporated on December 18, 1894. The city was named after Frederick Padden, a local settler who platted the village in 1856. In the late 1800s, Dr. William S. Pitts, a local physician and composer who wrote "The Church in the Wildwood", served as mayor of the town.

Bert L. Van Gorden (1873-1941), Wisconsin State Assemblyman and businessman, was born in Fredericksburg.

== Geography ==
According to the United States Census Bureau, the city has a total area of 0.86 square miles (2.23 km^{2}), all land.

== Demographics ==
Historical populations
Year	Pop.	±%
1880	203	—
1890	321	+58.1%
1900	565	+76.0%
1910	558	−1.2%
1920	624	+11.8%
1930	567	−9.1%
1940	649	+14.5%
1950	701	+8.0%
1960	797	+13.7%
1970	912	+14.4%
1980	1,075	+17.9%
1990	1,011	−6.0%
2000	984	−2.7%
2010	931	−5.4%
2020	987	+6.0%
Source:"U.S. Census website". United States Census Bureau. and Iowa Data Center; Source: U.S. Decennial Census

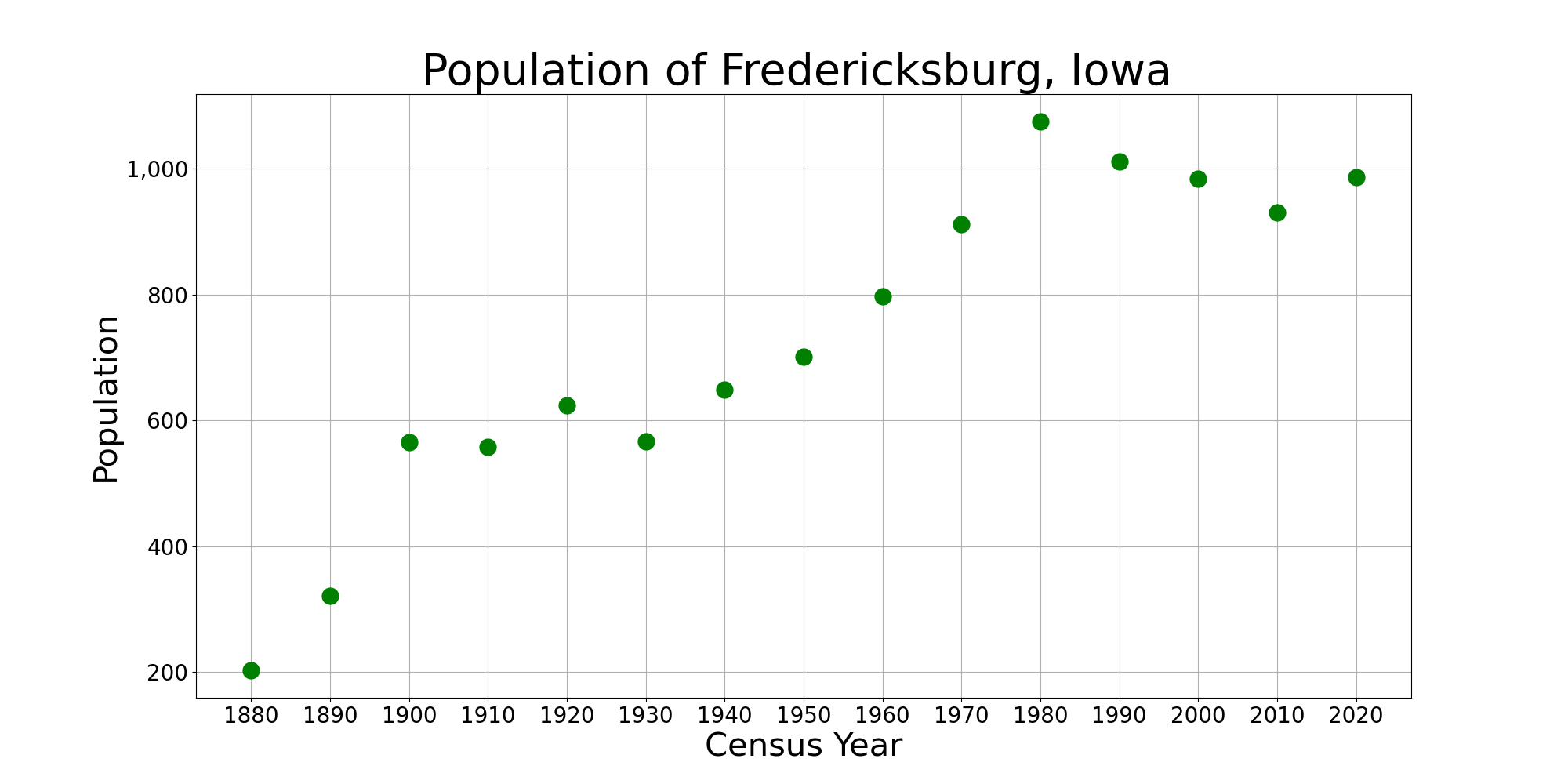
The population of Fredericksburg, Iowa from US census data

=== 2020 census ===
As of the census of 2020, there were 987 people, 427 households, and 257 families residing in the city. The population density was 1,097.1 inhabitants per square mile (423.6/km^{2}). There were 463 housing units at an average density of 514.6 per square mile (198.7/km^{2}). The racial makeup of the city was 93.0% White, 0.9% Black or African American, 0.3% Native American, 0.3% Asian, 0.0% Pacific Islander, 1.8% from other races and 3.6% from two or more races. Hispanic or Latino persons of any race comprised 4.0% of the population.

Of the 427 households, 26.7% of which had children under the age of 18 living with them, 45.9% were married couples living together, 8.2% were cohabitating couples, 26.5% had a female householder with no spouse or partner present and 19.4% had a male householder with no spouse or partner present. 39.8% of all households were non-families. 34.7% of all households were made up of individuals, 18.3% had someone living alone who was 65 years old or older.

The median age in the city was 43.7 years. 25.4% of the residents were under the age of 20; 3.2% were between the ages of 20 and 24; 22.2% were from 25 and 44; 24.3% were from 45 and 64; and 24.8% were 65 years of age or older. The gender makeup of the city was 49.3% male and 50.7% female.

=== 2010 census ===
As of the census of 2010, there were 931 people, 427 households, and 260 families living in the city. The population density was 1,082.6 inhabitants per square mile (418.0/km^{2}). There were 462 housing units at an average density of 537.2 per square mile (207.4/km^{2}). The racial makeup of the city was 96.1% White, 0.2% African American, 0.2% Native American, 0.1% Asian, 2.3% from other races, and 1.1% from two or more races. Hispanic or Latino of any race were 3.4% of the population.

There were 427 households, of which 23.4% had children under the age of 18 living with them, 50.6% were married couples living together, 6.3% had a female householder with no husband present, 4.0% had a male householder with no wife present, and 39.1% were non-families. 34.7% of all households were made up of individuals, and 17.1% had someone living alone who was 65 years of age or older. The average household size was 2.18 and the average family size was 2.77.

The median age in the city was 44.5 years. 21.6% of residents were under the age of 18; 6.7% were between the ages of 18 and 24; 22.5% were from 25 to 44; 27% were from 45 to 64; and 22.3% were 65 years of age or older. The gender makeup of the city was 50.2% male and 49.8% female.

=== 2000 census ===
As of the census of 2000, there were 984 people, 407 households, and 275 families living in the city. The population density was 1,143.9 inhabitants per square mile (441.7/km^{2}). There were 444 housing units at an average density of 516.1 per square mile (199.3/km^{2}). The racial makeup of the city was 99.09% White, 0.30% African American, 0.10% Native American, 0.20% Asian, and 0.30% from two or more races. Hispanic or Latino of any race were 0.20% of the population.

There were 407 households, out of which 31.7% had children under the age of 18 living with them, 56.8% were married couples living together, 8.1% had a female householder with no husband present, and 32.2% were non-families. 29.2% of all households were made up of individuals, and 15.5% had someone living alone who was 65 years of age or older. The average household size was 2.36 and the average family size was 2.87.

In the city, the population was spread out, with 25.7% under the age of 18, 6.1% from 18 to 24, 23.5% from 25 to 44, 24.0% from 45 to 64, and 20.7% who were 65 years of age or older. The median age was 42 years. For every 100 females, there were 88.1 males. For every 100 females age 18 and over, there were 90.4 males.

The median income for a household in the city was $31,938, and the median income for a family was $40,357. Males had a median income of $30,769 versus $21,364 for females. The per capita income for the city was $15,956. About 5.2% of families and 7.6% of the population were below the poverty line, including 5.2% of those under age 18 and 11.3% of those age 65 or over.

== Education ==
Fredericksburg is within the Sumner-Fredericksburg Community School District, which was formed by the merger of Sumner Community School District and Fredericksburg Community School District in 2004. Sumner-Fredericksburg High School in Sumner is the community high school.
