= Jefferson Township, Fayette County, Iowa =

Jefferson Township
- Township
- Location in Fayette County
- Coordinates: 42°41′11″N 91°54′11″W
- Country: United States
- State: Iowa
- County: Fayette

Area
  - Total: 36.46 sq mi (94.42 km^{2})
  - Land: 36.4 sq mi (94.2 km^{2})
  - Water: 0.085 sq mi (0.22 km^{2}) 0.23%
- Elevation: 1,106 ft (337 m)

Population (2010)
  - Total: 6,910
  - Density: 190/sq mi (73.4/km^{2})
- Time zone: UTC-6 (CST)
  - Summer (DST): UTC-5 (CDT)
- ZIP codes: 50655, 50662, 50671
- GNIS feature ID: 0468134

Jefferson Township is one of twenty townships in Fayette County, Iowa, United States. As of the 2010 census, its population was 6,910.

== Geography ==
According to the United States Census Bureau, Jefferson Township covers an area of 36.46 square miles (94.42 square kilometers); of this, 36.37 square miles (94.2 square kilometers, 99.77 percent) is land and 0.09 square miles (0.22 square kilometers, 0.23 percent) is water.

=== Cities, towns, villages ===
- Oelwein

=== Adjacent townships ===
- Harlan Township (north)
- Smithfield Township (northeast)
- Scott Township (east)
- Buffalo Township, Buchanan County (southeast)
- Hazleton Township, Buchanan County (south)
- Fairbank Township, Buchanan County (southwest)
- Oran Township (west)
- Fremont Township (northwest)

=== Cemeteries ===
The township contains these three cemeteries: Oakdale, Otsego and Woodlawn.

=== Major highways ===
- Iowa Highway 3
- Iowa Highway 150

=== Airports and landing strips ===
- Mercy Hospital Heliport

=== Landmarks ===
- Levin Park
- Platt Park
- Red Gate Park
- Reedy Park
- Wings Park

== School districts ==
- Oelwein Community School District
- West Central Community School District

== Political districts ==
- Iowa's 1st congressional district
- State House District 18
- State Senate District 9
