= Mortimer Cleveland =

American architect

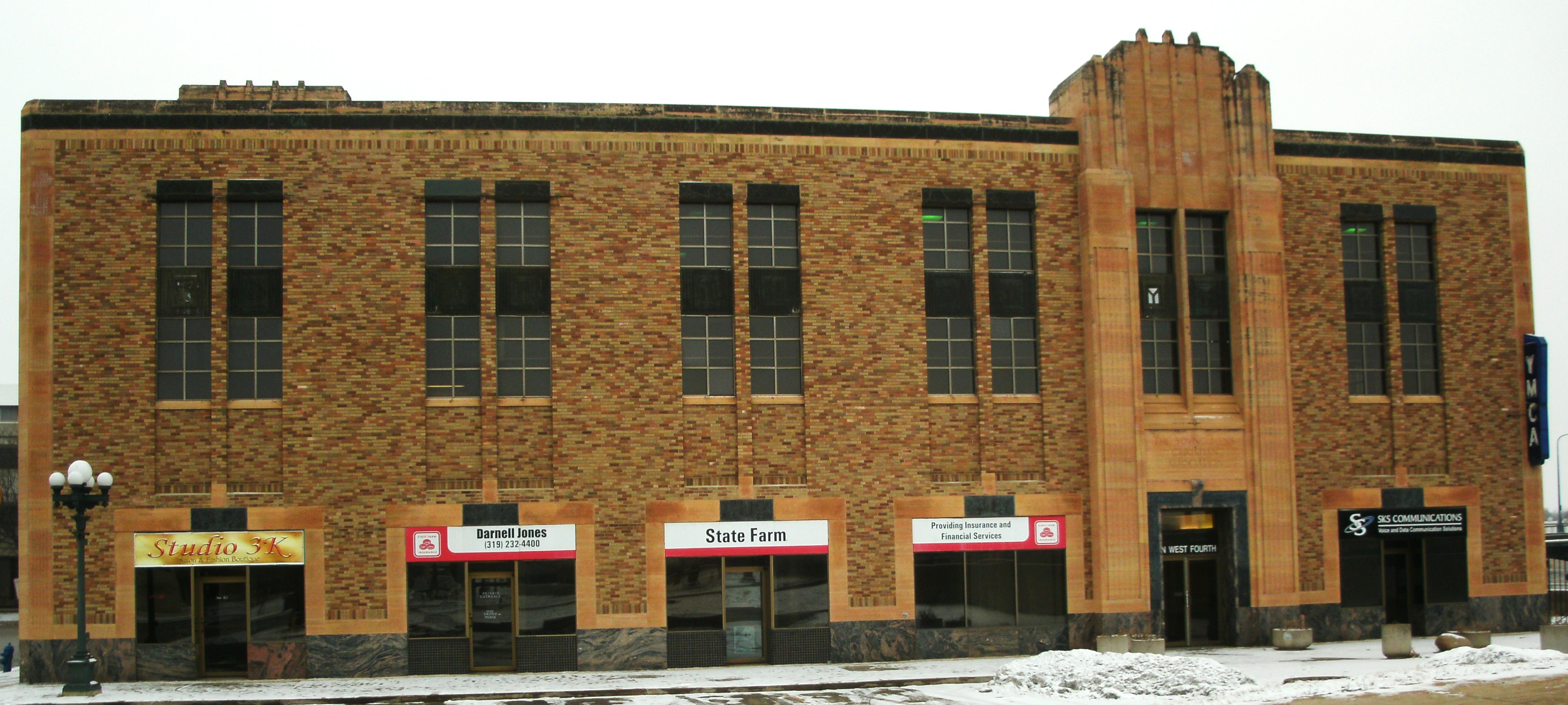
YMCA Building (Waterloo, Iowa)

Mortimer B. Cleveland 19 Nov 1882-23 May 1979 (aged 96) was an American architect of Waterloo, Iowa, and was "one of Waterloo's most prominent architects".

He attended the University of Illinois and received bachelors and masters in architecture. He designed almost 40 homes in the Highland District of Waterloo during 1909 to 1926. He also designed commercial and public buildings. He worked creatively until 1969, age 86.

A number of his works are listed on the U.S. National Register of Historic Places.

Works include (with attribution):

- Bremer County Court House, 415 E. Bremer Ave. Waverly, Iowa (Cleveland, Mortimer B.), NRHP-listed
- Dr. Salsbury's Laboratories, Main Office and Production Laboratory Building, 500 Gilbert St. Charles City, Iowa (Cleveland, Mortimer), NRHP-listed
- one or more works in the Highland Historic District, Waterloo, Iowa (Cleveland, Mortimer B.), NRHP-listed
- one or more works in North Grinnell Historic District, Grinnell, Iowa (Cleveland, Mortimer)
- one or more works in the Waterloo East Commercial Historic District, Waterloo, Iowa
- Roosevelt Elementary School, 200 E. Arlington St. Waterloo, Iowa (Cleveland, Mortimer B.), NRHP-listed
- YMCA Building, 154 W. 4th St. Waterloo, IA (Cleveland, Mortimer), NRHP-listed
- E.R. Gibson House (Mason City, Iowa), 114 4th St. (Cleveland, Mortimer), NRHP-listed
