= Artesian, Iowa =

- unincorporated community
- Location within Iowa
- Coordinates: 42°43′42″N 92°20′14″W
- Country: United States
- State: Iowa
- County: Bremer County
- Elevation: 978 ft (298 m)
- Time zone: UTC-6 (Central (CST))
  - Summer (DST): UTC-5 (CDT)
- GNIS feature ID: 464449

Artesian is an unincorporated community in Bremer County, in the U.S. state of Iowa.

== Geography ==
Artesian is located approximately 0.5 miles (0.80 km) north of the junction of Highway 63 and State Highway 3.

== History ==
St. Paul's Lutheran Church in Artesian was established in 1871. The Moeller General Store in Artesian was founded in 1900 by Fred F. Moeller.

The village of Artesian was named after artesian wells discovered in the area: one in the basement of the General Store (which was capped) and another across the road.

The community's population was 13 in 1900, and 10 in 1920. The population was 10 in 1940.

By 1950, the population of Artesian was 7, and the community was considered "almost abandoned".

The General Store was torn down in the 1980s due to a shoulder-widening project on US Highway 63.

== See also ==
- Horton, Iowa
