= St. John's United Church of Christ of Siegel =

Coordinates: 42.829°N 92.357°W

St. John's United Church of Christ is a church in Douglas Township in Bremer County, Iowa. Founded in 1874 by German settlers in the area of the now-defunct town of Siegel. The church has been in continuous operation and remains active, although the membership has declined from its high in the 1920s.

== History of the church ==
German settlers in the area of Siegel formed St. Paul's Lutheran Church of Siegel, in 1872. When differences arose either over a conflict concerning the burial of one of the members of that church or due to dogmatic differences between adherents of the Lutheran church and those of the German Evangelical Synod of North America, 18 members under the leadership of Reverend P. Hagemann broke away to form St. John's Church of Siegel on February 22, 1874. The first pastor was Rev. David Kurz.

The founding members secured a 5-acre (20,000 m^{2}) plot in Douglas Township in Bremer County on which they proceeded to build a church with living quarters for the minister in the rear and cemetery. In 1889, during the tenure of Rev. John Reinecke, the church built a separate parsonage. In 1897, a schoolhouse was built to the south of the church and parsonage. In 1922, the current church building was dedicated and in 1924, the church celebrated its 50th anniversary. The current parsonage was built in 1925.

The church was originally affiliated with the German Evangelical Synod of North America, which joined with another denomination of German background, the Reformed Church in the United States, to form the Evangelical and Reformed Church in 1934. This church united in 1957 with the General Council of Congregational Christian Churches to form the United Church of Christ.

At its largest, the church had a membership of almost 400 members in the 1920s.

== Sources ==
- Atlas of Bremer County, Iowa, Title Atlas Company, Inc., 1983, Minneapolis, Minnesota
- St. John's United Church of Christ of Siegel History, 1874-1974
