= Fredericksburg School District =

Fredericksburg School District may refer to:

- Fredericksburg Independent School District, Texas
- Fredericksburg Community School District, Iowa (merged)
