= Frederika Township, Iowa =

Township in Iowa, US

Frederika Township, Bremer County
- Township
- Coordinates: 42°51′31″N 092°17′09″W
- Country: United States
- State: Iowa
- County: Bremer

Area
  - Total: 18.95 sq mi (49.09 km^{2})
  - Land: 18.8 sq mi (48.8 km^{2})
  - Water: 0.11 sq mi (0.28 km^{2})
- Elevation: 1,001 ft (305 m)

Population (2010)
  - Total: 363
  - Density: 19/sq mi (7.4/km^{2})
- Time zone: UTC-6 (Central)
  - Summer (DST): UTC-5 (Central)
- FIPS code: 19-91440
- GNIS feature ID: 0467867

Frederika Township is one of fourteen townships in Bremer County, Iowa, USA. At the 2000 census, its population was 363.

== Geography ==
Frederika Township covers an area of 18.95 square miles (49.1 km^{2}) and contains one incorporated settlement, Frederika. According to the USGS, it contains two cemeteries: Faith and Walling (historical).
