= Bremer, Iowa =

- unincorporated community
- Location within Iowa
- Coordinates: 42°46′24″N 92°23′42″W
- Country: United States
- State: Iowa
- County: Bremer
- Elevation: 1,030 ft (310 m)
- Time zone: UTC-6 (Central (CST))
  - Summer (DST): UTC-5 (CDT)
- GNIS feature ID: 454816

Bremer is an unincorporated community in Warren Township in Bremer County, Iowa, United States.

== Geography ==
Bremer is located at the junction of County Roads C33 and C21.

== History ==
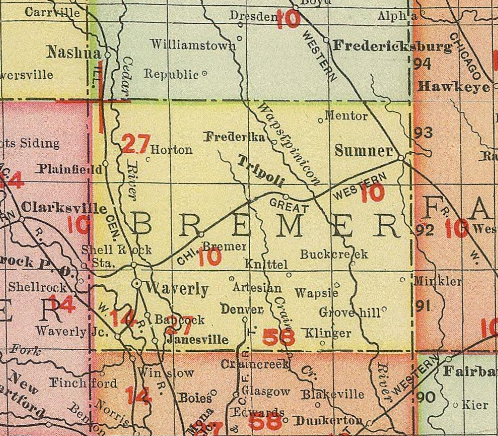
Bremer in Bremer County, Iowa, in 1903

The Bremer post office opened in June 1858, closed in November 1859, reopened in June 1888, closed again in October 1913, reopened in December 1916, and continued operation until February 1980, when it closed permanently.

Bremer was founded on the Chicago Great Western Railway. A bank operated in Bremer until the Great Depression forced its closure in 1933. Bremer also once had a Missouri Synod Lutheran church.

The Schrodermeier School was built one mile west of Bremer in 1902.

Bremer's population was 25 in 1887, was 30 in 1902, was 52 in 1917, and was 30 in 1925. The population was estimated at 200 in 1940.

In 1990 and 1992, RAGBRAI, a statewide bicycle ride, passed through Bremer.
