= Siegel, Iowa =

- Ghost town
- Location within Iowa Location within the United States
- Coordinates: 42.829°N 92.357°W
- Country: United States
- State: Iowa
- County: Bremer
- Time zone: UTC-6 (Central (CST))
  - Summer (DST): UTC-5 (CDT)

Siegel is a ghost town in Douglas Township in Bremer County, Iowa, United States. Founded in 1889, the community ceased to exist in the 1940s.

== Geography ==
Siegel was located on present-day Kildeer Avenue, one mile west of U.S. Route 63 and between 160th Street and 150th Street.

== History of the area ==
Primarily settled by Germans, Siegel was named by Frederick Schultz, Jr., the first postmaster of the Siegel post office. The settlement was likely named after Union General Franz Sigel who recruited hundreds of German-American soldiers for the Union Army during the American Civil War. In fact, many Iowans served under General Sigel first in Missouri at the Battle of Wilson's Creek and later in General U.S. Grant's Army of the Potomac.

The post office at Siegel was established on June 26, 1889 but was closed on September 15, 1900. However, a creamery and general store remained until the 1940s.

Today, all that is left of Siegel is St. John's United Church of Christ of Siegel.
