= Bremer County, Iowa =

County in Iowa, United States

- County
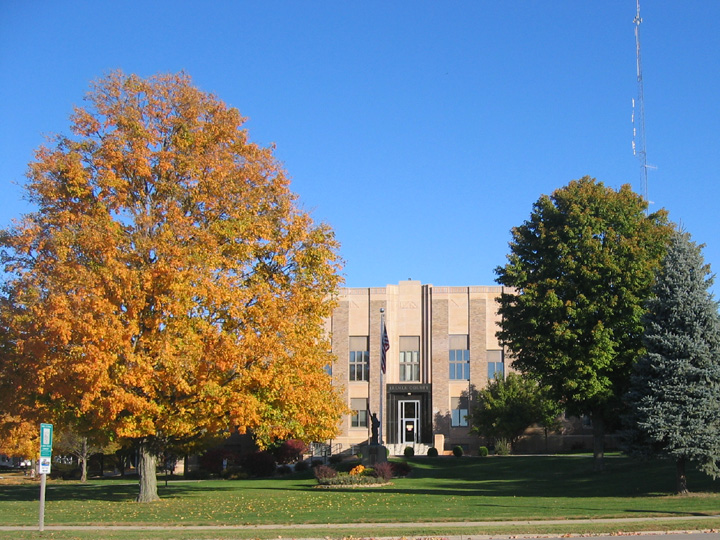
- Bremer County Court House

- Location within the U.S. state of Iowa
- Coordinates: 42°46′27″N 92°19′01″W
- Country: United States
- State: Iowa
- Founded: 1851
- Named for: Fredrika Bremer
- Seat: Waverly
- Largest city: Waverly

Area
  - Total: 439 sq mi (1,140 km^{2})
  - Land: 435 sq mi (1,130 km^{2})
  - Water: 3.9 sq mi (10 km^{2}) 0.9%

Population (2020)
  - Total: 24,988
  - Estimate (2025): 25,296 ▲
  - Density: 57.4/sq mi (22.2/km^{2})
- Time zone: UTC−6 (Central)
  - Summer (DST): UTC−5 (CDT)
- Congressional district: 2nd
- Website: www.bremercounty.iowa.gov
- Iowa county number 09

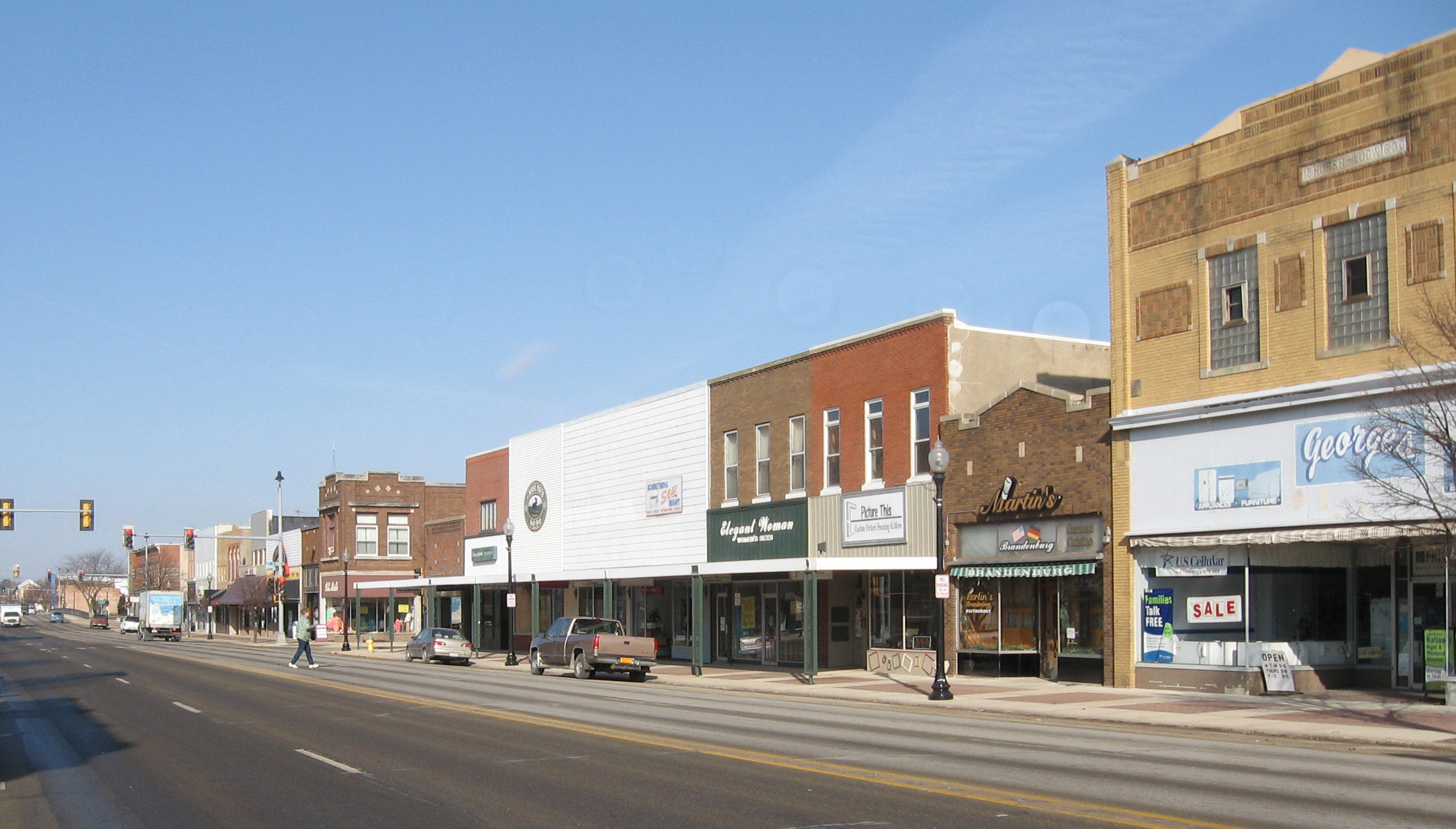
Waverly

Bremer County (/ˈbriːmər/) is a county in the northeastern part of the U.S. state of Iowa. As of the 2020 Census, the population was 24,988. Its county seat is Waverly. The county was named for Fredrika Bremer, a Swedish feminist writer.

Bremer County is included in the Waterloo-Cedar Falls metropolitan area.

== Geography ==
According to the U.S. Census Bureau, the county has a total area of 439 square miles (1,140 km^{2}), of which 435 square miles (1,130 km^{2}) is land and 3.9 square miles (10 km^{2}) (0.9%) is water. It is intersected by the Cedar and Wapsipinicon rivers.

=== Major highways ===
- U.S. Highway 63
- U.S. Highway 218
- Iowa Highway 3
- Iowa Highway 27
- Iowa Highway 93
- Iowa Highway 188

=== Adjacent counties ===
- Chickasaw County (north)
- Fayette County (east)
- Floyd County (northwest)
- Black Hawk County (south)
- Buchanan County (southeast)
- Butler County (west)

== Demographics ==
Historical population
Census	Pop.	Note	%±
1860	4,915		—
1870	12,528		154.9%
1880	14,081		12.4%
1890	14,630		3.9%
1900	16,305		11.4%
1910	15,843		−2.8%
1920	16,728		5.6%
1930	17,046		1.9%
1940	17,932		5.2%
1950	18,884		5.3%
1960	21,108		11.8%
1970	22,737		7.7%
1980	24,820		9.2%
1990	22,813		−8.1%
2000	23,325		2.2%
2010	24,276		4.1%
2020	24,988		2.9%
2025 (est.)	25,296	▲	1.2%
U.S. Decennial Census; 1790-1960 1900-1990; 1990-2000 2010-2018

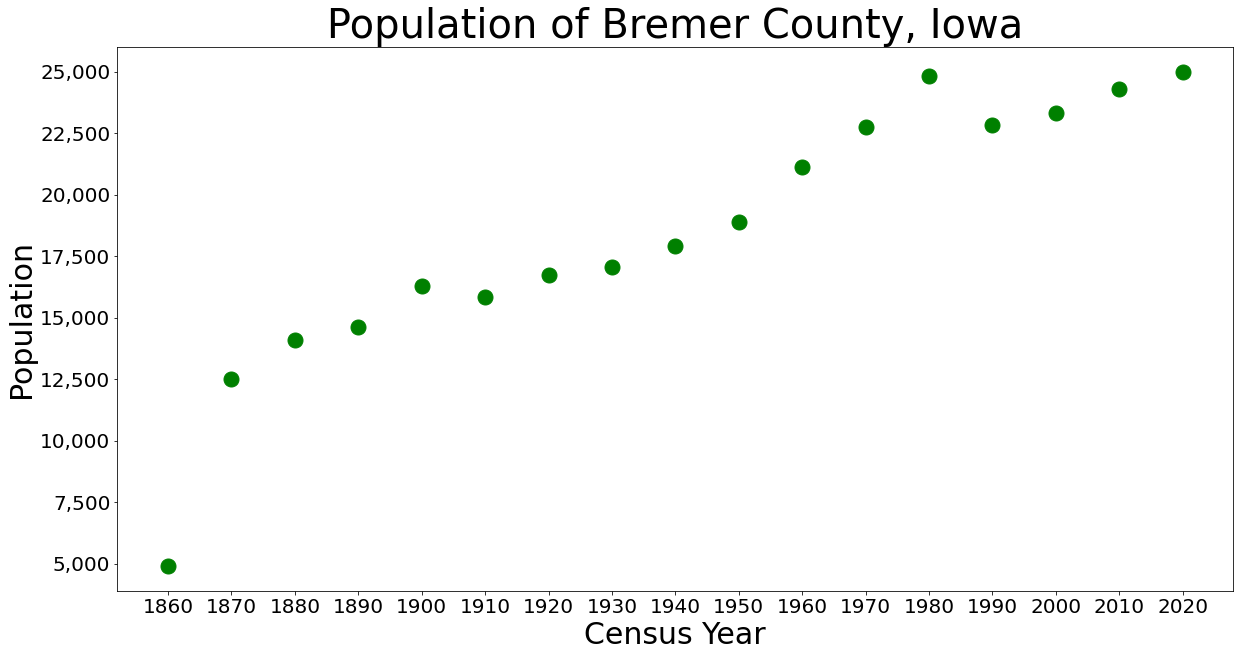
Population of Bremer County from US census data

=== 2020 census ===
As of the 2020 census, the county had a population of 24,988 and a population density of 56.8/sq mi (21.9/km^{2}); 97.01% of residents reported being of one race.

The median age was 39.6 years. 23.4% of residents were under the age of 18 and 20.3% of residents were 65 years of age or older. For every 100 females there were 97.2 males, and for every 100 females age 18 and over there were 94.2 males age 18 and over.

The racial makeup of the county was 94.4% White, 1.0% Black or African American, 0.2% American Indian and Alaska Native, 0.8% Asian, <0.1% Native Hawaiian and Pacific Islander, 0.6% from some other race, and 3.0% from two or more races. Hispanic or Latino residents of any race comprised 2.0% of the population.

36.7% of residents lived in urban areas, while 63.3% lived in rural areas.

There were 9,646 households in the county, of which 29.8% had children under the age of 18 living in them. Of all households, 58.0% were married-couple households, 15.1% were households with a male householder and no spouse or partner present, and 21.4% were households with a female householder and no spouse or partner present. About 26.9% of all households were made up of individuals and 13.6% had someone living alone who was 65 years of age or older.

There were 10,484 housing units, of which 9,646 were occupied and 8.0% were vacant. Among occupied housing units, 80.6% were owner-occupied and 19.4% were renter-occupied. The homeowner vacancy rate was 2.0% and the rental vacancy rate was 11.9%.

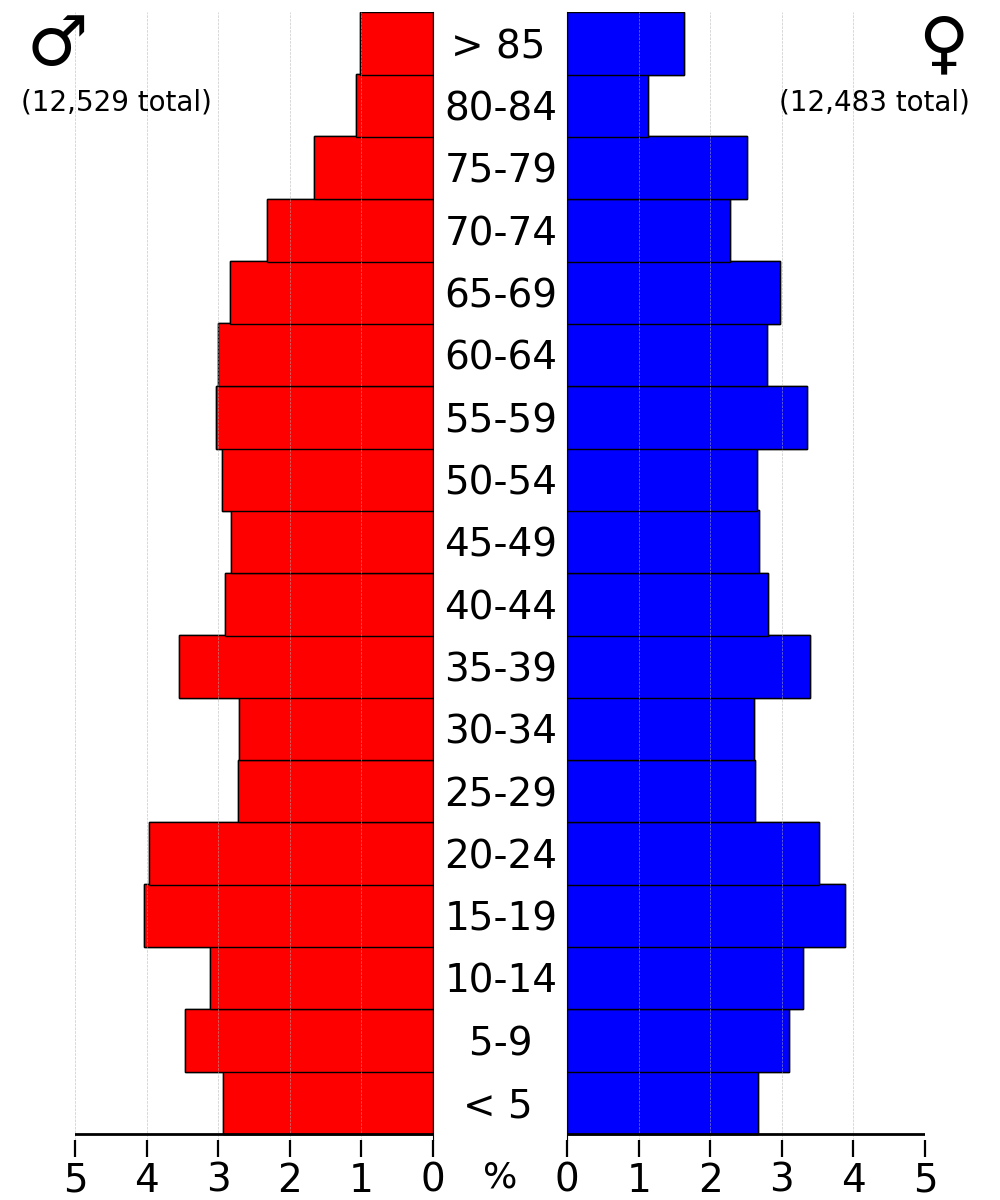
2022 US Census population pyramid for Bremer County from ACS 5-year estimates

=== 2010 census ===
The 2010 census recorded a population of 24,276 in the county, with a population density of 55.4/sq mi (21.4/km^{2}). There were 9,915 housing units, of which 9,385 were occupied.

=== 2000 census ===
As of the census of 2000, there were 23,325 people, 8,860 households, and 6,326 families residing in the county. The population density was 53 inhabitants per square mile (20/km^{2}). There were 9,337 housing units at an average density of 21 per square mile (8.1/km^{2}). The racial makeup of the county was 98.22% White, 0.48% Black or African American, 0.06% Native American, 0.52% Asian, 0.02% Pacific Islander, 0.10% from other races, and 0.60% from two or more races. 0.56% of the population were Hispanic or Latino of any race.

There were 8,860 households, out of which 32.00% had children under the age of 18 living with them, 62.50% were married couples living together, 6.20% had a female householder with no husband present, and 28.60% were non-families. 24.70% of all households were made up of individuals, and 12.70% had someone living alone who was 65 years of age or older. The average household size was 2.47 and the average family size was 2.95.

In the county, the population was spread out, with 24.10% under the age of 18, 12.00% from 18 to 24, 23.90% from 25 to 44, 23.90% from 45 to 64, and 16.00% who were 65 years of age or older. The median age was 38 years. For every 100 females, there were 93.60 males. For every 100 females age 18 and over, there were 89.30 males.

The median income for a household in the county was $40,826, and the median income for a family was $50,299. Males had a median income of $34,212 versus $22,250 for females. The per capita income for the county was $19,199. About 2.90% of families and 5.10% of the population were below the poverty line, including 4.20% of those under age 18 and 5.80% of those age 65 or over.

== Education ==
Wartburg College is located in Waverly.

Waverly-Shell Rock Community School District

- Waverly-Shell Rock Senior High School
- Waverly-Shell Rock Middle School
- Margaretta Carey Elementary School
- Shell Rock Elementary
- WSR Southeast Elementary
- WSR West Cedar Elementary
- WSR Lied Campus
- St. Paul's Lutheran School

Denver Community School District

- High school
- Middle school
- Elementary School
- Discoveries Preschool

Janesville Consolidated Community School District

Nashua-Plainfield Community School District

Sumner-Fredericksburg Community School District

- Sumner-Fredericksburg High School
- S-F Middle School
- Fredericksburg Elementary
- Durant Elementary
- Fredericksburg Preschool
- Sumner Preschool

Tripoli Community School District

== Attractions ==
The Bremer County Fair is held at the county fairgrounds in Waverly every year in early August. It celebrated its 135th year in August 2010. Attractions include livestock and craft exhibitions, truck and tractor pulls, commercial and local exhibits, and various contests, performances, and concerts.

The Bremer County Court House, which opened in 1937, is listed on the National Register of Historic Places.

The Bremer County Historical Society and Museum was originally built in 1862 as a stagecoach stop and hotel. It is listed on the National Register of Historic Places.

== Communities ==
=== Cities ===
- Denver
- Frederika
- Janesville
- Plainfield
- Readlyn
- Sumner
- Tripoli
- Waverly (county seat)

=== Unincorporated communities ===
- Artesian
- Bremer
- Buck Creek
- Horton
- Klinger
- Siegel
- Wapsie
- Waverly Junction

=== Population ranking ===
The population ranking of the following table is based on the 2020 census of Bremer County. † county seat

Rank	City/Town/etc.	Municipal type	Population (2020 Census)	Population (2024 Estimate)
1	† Waverly	City	10,394	10,663
2	Sumner (partially in Fayette County)	City	2,030	2,037
3	Denver	City	1,919	1,995
4	Tripoli	City	1,191	1,180
5	Janesville (partially in Black Hawk County)	City	1,034	1,107
6	Readlyn	City	845	872
7	Plainfield	City	393	400
8	Frederika	City	204	207

== Government ==
=== Townships ===
Bremer County is divided into fourteen townships:

- Dayton
- Douglas
- Franklin
- Frederika
- Fremont
- Jackson
- Jefferson
- Lafayette
- Le Roy
- Maxfield
- Polk
- Sumner No. 2
- Warren
- Washington

== Politics ==
Between 1964 and 2016, Bremer County voted for the nationwide winner in each election except for 1976. Elections were particularly close in the county from 1988 to 2012. In 2016, Donald Trump became the first candidate of any party to win the county by more than 10% since the 1984 landslide reelection of Ronald Reagan, a feat he repeated in 2020 and 2024 with an increased vote share and margin of victory in each as well.

United States presidential election results for Bremer County, Iowa
Year	Republican		Democratic		Third party(ies)	
Year	No.	%	No.	%	No.	%
1896	2,116	54.02%	1,704	43.50%	97	2.48%
1900	2,178	52.46%	1,929	46.46%	45	1.08%
1904	1,927	50.82%	1,783	47.02%	82	2.16%
1908	1,656	45.30%	1,925	52.65%	75	2.05%
1912	1,013	26.91%	1,944	51.65%	807	21.44%
1916	2,684	69.77%	1,132	29.43%	31	0.81%
1920	6,287	86.49%	902	12.41%	80	1.10%
1924	3,532	48.32%	911	12.46%	2,867	39.22%
1928	3,879	55.08%	3,146	44.67%	18	0.26%
1932	2,520	31.52%	5,411	67.69%	63	0.79%
1936	3,220	38.02%	5,058	59.72%	192	2.27%
1940	5,374	63.26%	3,103	36.53%	18	0.21%
1944	4,861	63.61%	2,764	36.17%	17	0.22%
1948	3,837	51.62%	3,502	47.11%	94	1.26%
1952	6,806	74.12%	2,363	25.73%	14	0.15%
1956	5,930	67.15%	2,892	32.75%	9	0.10%
1960	6,504	66.76%	3,234	33.20%	4	0.04%
1964	3,880	43.41%	5,045	56.44%	14	0.16%
1968	5,604	65.75%	2,481	29.11%	438	5.14%
1972	6,333	65.89%	3,122	32.48%	156	1.62%
1976	6,252	58.51%	4,203	39.34%	230	2.15%
1980	6,706	59.25%	3,527	31.16%	1,085	9.59%
1984	6,895	62.37%	4,084	36.94%	76	0.69%
1988	5,079	50.29%	4,961	49.12%	59	0.58%
1992	4,482	38.26%	4,774	40.75%	2,458	20.98%
1996	4,213	41.42%	5,023	49.38%	936	9.20%
2000	5,675	50.78%	5,169	46.26%	331	2.96%
2004	6,665	52.16%	6,025	47.15%	89	0.70%
2008	5,741	44.60%	6,940	53.92%	191	1.48%
2012	6,405	47.99%	6,763	50.67%	178	1.33%
2016	7,208	53.24%	5,356	39.56%	974	7.19%
2020	8,294	57.02%	5,958	40.96%	294	2.02%
2024	8,799	60.24%	5,571	38.14%	237	1.62%

== See also ==
- National Register of Historic Places listings in Bremer County, Iowa
- Bremer County Court House
