= Jackson Township, Bremer County, Iowa =

Township in Iowa, US

Jackson Township, Bremer County
- Township
- Coordinates: 42°39′53″N 092°28′18″W
- Country: United States
- State: Iowa
- County: Bremer

Area
  - Total: 24.36 sq mi (63.08 km^{2})
  - Land: 24.28 sq mi (62.89 km^{2})
  - Water: 0.073 sq mi (0.19 km^{2})
- Elevation: 920 ft (280 m)

Population (2010)
  - Total: 1,446
  - Density: 58/sq mi (22.3/km^{2})
- Time zone: UTC-6 (Central)
  - Summer (DST): UTC-5 (Central)
- FIPS code: 19-92097
- GNIS feature ID: 0468093

Jackson Township is one of fourteen townships in Bremer County, Iowa, USA. At the 2010 census, its population was 1,446.

== Geography ==
Jackson Township covers an area of 24.35 square miles (63.1 km^{2}) and contains one incorporated settlement, Janesville. According to the USGS, it contains three cemeteries: Oakland, Pilot Mound and Waverly Junction.
