= Fremont Township, Bremer County, Iowa =

Township in Iowa, US

Fremont Township, Bremer County
- Township
- Coordinates: 42°46′33″N 092°15′34″W
- Country: United States
- State: Iowa
- County: Bremer

Area
  - Total: 36.82 sq mi (95.37 km^{2})
  - Land: 36.58 sq mi (94.74 km^{2})
  - Water: 0.24 sq mi (0.63 km^{2})
- Elevation: 1,037 ft (316 m)

Population (2010)
  - Total: 1,709
  - Density: 47/sq mi (18/km^{2})
- Time zone: UTC-6 (Central)
  - Summer (DST): UTC-5 (Central)
- FIPS code: 19-91458
- GNIS feature ID: 0467873

Fremont Township is one of fourteen townships in Bremer County, Iowa, USA. At the 2010 census, its population was 1,709.

== Geography ==
Fremont Township covers an area of 36.82 square miles (95.4 km^{2}) and contains one incorporated settlement, Tripoli. According to the USGS, it contains three cemeteries: Fremont, Grace and Saint Johns Lutheran.
