= Horton, Iowa =

- unincorporated community
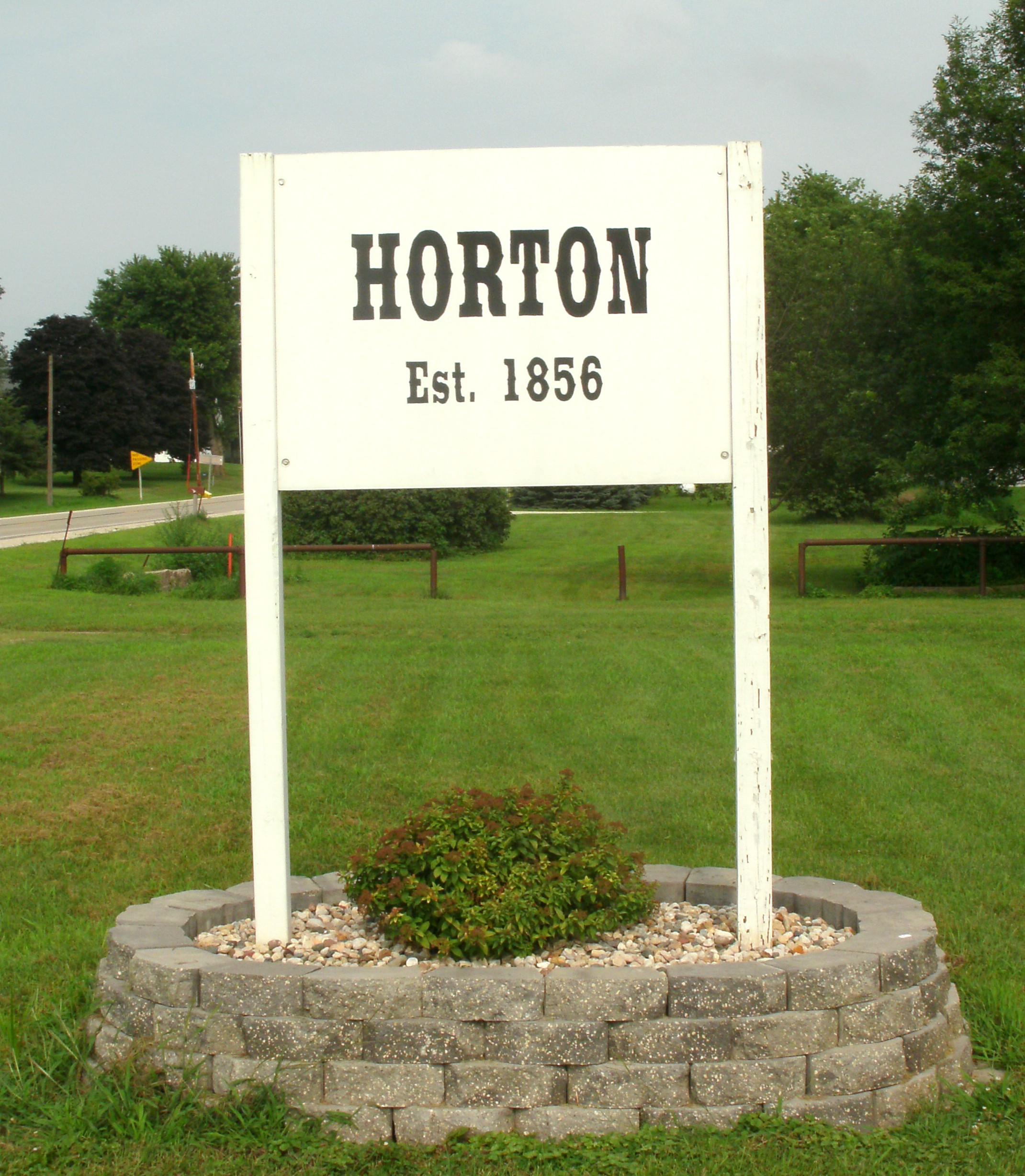
- Welcome Sign in Horton

- Location within Iowa
- Coordinates: 42°50′51″N 92°28′32″W
- Country: United States
- State: Iowa
- County: Bremer
- Elevation: 955 ft (291 m)
- Time zone: UTC-6 (Central (CST))
  - Summer (DST): UTC-5 (CDT)
- GNIS feature ID: 457672

Horton is an unincorporated community in Polk Township in Bremer County, Iowa, United States.

== Geography ==
Horton lies at the junction of Iowa Highway 188 and County Road V14. It is three miles east of Plainfield.

== History ==
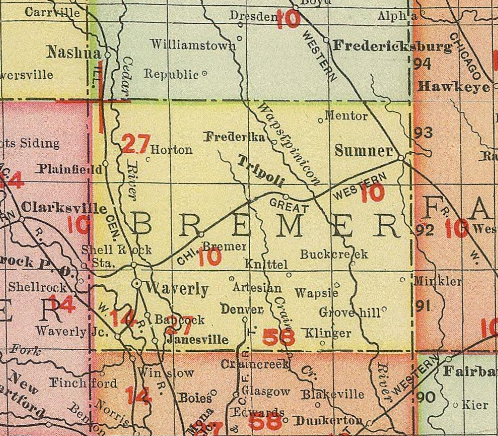
Horton in Bremer County, Iowa, in 1903

Horton was platted by C.A. Lease in 1856. A sawmill had previously been built during the winter of 1855-1856.

The Horton post office was established in 1857, and a schoolhouse, the first frame schoolhouse in Polk Township, was built in 1859. These buildings were soon joined by a store, a blacksmith shop, and houses.

Horton's population was 75 in 1887, was 70 in 1902, and was 79 in 1917. Horton's population had increased to 100 in 1925, but the town's fortunes began to decline after that.

The Horton post office closed in 1907.
