= Bremer County Court House =

- U.S. National Register of Historic Places
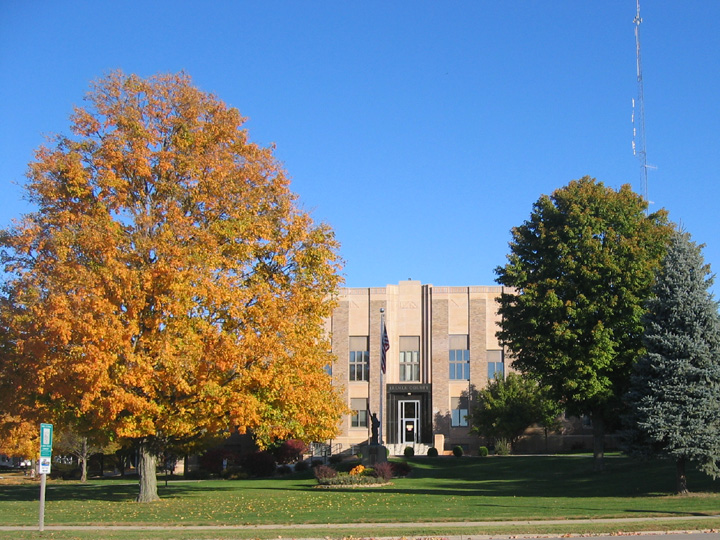

- Location within Iowa Location within the United States
- Interactive map showing the location for Bremer County Courthouse
- Location: 415 E. Bremer Ave. Waverly, Iowa
- Coordinates: 42°43′34″N 92°27′54″W
- Area: about 5 acres (2.0 ha)
- Built: 1937
- Built by: Drape Construction Co.
- Architect: Mortimer B. Cleveland
- MPS: PWA-Era County Courthouses of IA MPS
- NRHP reference No.: 03000821
- Added to NRHP: August 28, 2003

The Bremer County Court House in Waverly, Iowa, United States, was built in 1937. It was listed on the National Register of Historic Places in 2003 as a part of the PWA-Era County Courthouses of IA Multiple Properties Submission. The courthouse is the fourth building the county has used for court functions and county administration.

== History ==
Bremer County's first courthouse was a small frame building used from 1854-1857. It was replaced by a two-story brick structure measuring 63 by 43 feet (19 by 13 m) at a cost of $23,000. The jailer and his family lived in the basement. It was used for a variety of civic purposes until 1869 when the county board of supervisors limited its use to political and county societies. A "fireproof" building was built next to the existing courthouse in 1870 to house county records and several county offices.

Throughout the 1920s and 1930s conversations were held at various times concerning a new courthouse to replace the 1857 structure, which had become too small. The county applied for funding from the Public Works Administration (PWA) in 1935 to assist with construction costs and received approval of the request of $60,750. This is one of ten courthouses in Iowa that received PWA funds. County supervisors retained Waterloo architect Mortimer Cleveland to design the new building and a debate began about moving the county seat to Tripoli, the supervisors tabled it. In March 1936, voters approved a referendum to fund the rest of the construction costs. Drape Construction Co. of Tripoli received the contract to build the building, and work commenced in October 1936 and was completed the following summer. Final construction cost was $119,000. The June 6, 1937 dedication ceremony seen by 1,500 people. Justice Richard Mitchell of the Iowa Supreme Court and P.P. Hopkins, the State PWA Director, were the featured speakers. After the new courthouse was dedicated the old courthouse, as well as an old music pavilion and a fountain, were taken down from the square. The square was then graded and landscaped.

== Architecture ==
The architectural style of the building is known as Depression Modern or PWA Moderne. The building features a symmetrical façade with a central section of 3½ stories that is flanked by two lower sections of 2½ stories over a raised basement. The exterior is clad in brick and Kasota stone, a cream-colored limestone. A central corridor extends the length of the building on each floor and office spaces extend from the corridors. The interior featured multi-colored terrazzo floors, marble wainscoting, and acoustic tile.

The building is located on the courthouse square on the east side of the central business district where the previous courthouse was also located. Two elements on the courthouse square, which itself is a contributing site, are contributing objects on the building's nomination to the National Register of Historic Places. The first element is the building's original flagpole. The second is a replica of the Statue of Liberty (1950), which commemorates the 40th anniversary of the Boy Scouts of America.
