= Taylor, Wisconsin =

- Village
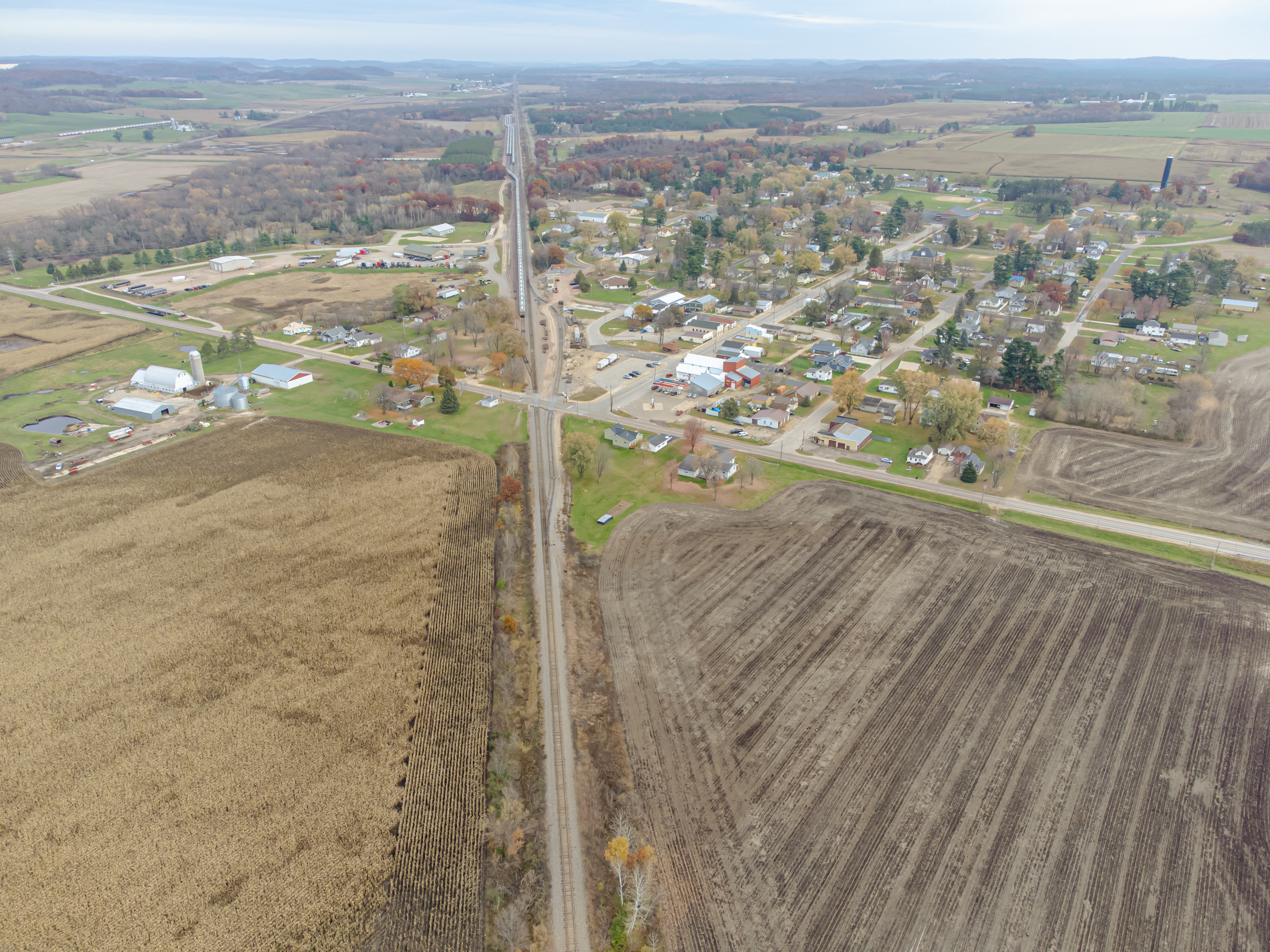

- Location of Taylor in Jackson County, Wisconsin.
- Coordinates: 44°19′19″N 91°7′17″W
- Country: United States
- State: Wisconsin
- County: Jackson

Area
  - Total: 0.73 sq mi (1.89 km^{2})
  - Land: 0.73 sq mi (1.89 km^{2})
  - Water: 0 sq mi (0.00 km^{2})
- Elevation: 892 ft (272 m)

Population (2020)
  - Total: 484
  - Density: 663/sq mi (256/km^{2})
- Time zone: UTC-6 (Central (CST))
  - Summer (DST): UTC-5 (CDT)
- Area codes: 715 & 534
- FIPS code: 55-79150
- GNIS feature ID: 1575268
- Website: https://villageoftaylor.us/

Taylor is a village in Jackson County, Wisconsin, United States, along the Trempealeau River. The population was 484 at the 2020 census.

== Geography ==
Taylor is located at 44°19′19″N 91°7′17″W (44.322018, -91.121381).

According to the United States Census Bureau, the village has a total area of 0.73 square miles (1.89 km^{2}), all land.

== Demographics ==
Historical population
Census	Pop.	Note	%±
1880	54		—
1920	313		—
1930	339		8.3%
1940	314		−7.4%
1950	350		11.5%
1960	334		−4.6%
1970	322		−3.6%
1980	411		27.6%
1990	419		1.9%
2000	513		22.4%
2010	476		−7.2%
2020	484		1.7%
U.S. Decennial Census

=== 2010 census ===
As of the census of 2010, there were 476 people, 212 households, and 120 families living in the village. The population density was 652.1 inhabitants per square mile (251.8/km^{2}). There were 226 housing units at an average density of 309.6 per square mile (119.5/km^{2}). The racial makeup of the village was 98.3% White, 0.6% African American, 0.6% Native American, 0.2% Asian, and 0.2% from two or more races. Hispanic or Latino of any race were 3.4% of the population.

There were 212 households, of which 30.2% had children under the age of 18 living with them, 36.8% were married couples living together, 12.7% had a female householder with no husband present, 7.1% had a male householder with no wife present, and 43.4% were non-families. 34.4% of all households were made up of individuals, and 14.2% had someone living alone who was 65 years of age or older. The average household size was 2.25 and the average family size was 2.83.

The median age in the village was 37.8 years. 23.1% of residents were under the age of 18; 10% were between the ages of 18 and 24; 26.1% were from 25 to 44; 26.5% were from 45 to 64; and 14.3% were 65 years of age or older. The gender makeup of the village was 48.9% male and 51.1% female.

=== 2000 census ===
As of the census of 2000, there were 513 people, 209 households, and 137 families living in the village. The population density was 706.6 people per square mile (271.3/km^{2}). There were 237 housing units at an average density of 326.4 per square mile (125.4/km^{2}). The racial makeup of the village was 97.27% White, 1.95% Native American, 0.58% Asian, and 0.19% from two or more races.

There were 209 households, out of which 33.5% had children under the age of 18 living with them, 45.5% were married couples living together, 13.9% had a female householder with no husband present, and 34.0% were non-families. 29.7% of all households were made up of individuals, and 13.9% had someone living alone who was 65 years of age or older. The average household size was 2.45 and the average family size was 2.91.

In the village, the population was spread out, with 29.8% under the age of 18, 9.0% from 18 to 24, 25.3% from 25 to 44, 21.8% from 45 to 64, and 14.0% who were 65 years of age or older. The median age was 36 years. For every 100 females, there were 101.2 males. For every 100 females age 18 and over, there were 98.9 males.

The median income for a household in the village was $25,833, and the median income for a family was $28,958. Males had a median income of $23,250 versus $17,961 for females. The per capita income for the village was $11,091. About 20.5% of families and 20.5% of the population were below the poverty line, including 18.7% of those under age 18 and 29.5% of those age 65 or over.

== Notable person ==
- Bert L. Van Gorden (1873–1941), businessman and Wisconsin State Representative, lived in Taylor.
