= Roosevelt Elementary School (Waterloo, Iowa) =

- U.S. National Register of Historic Places
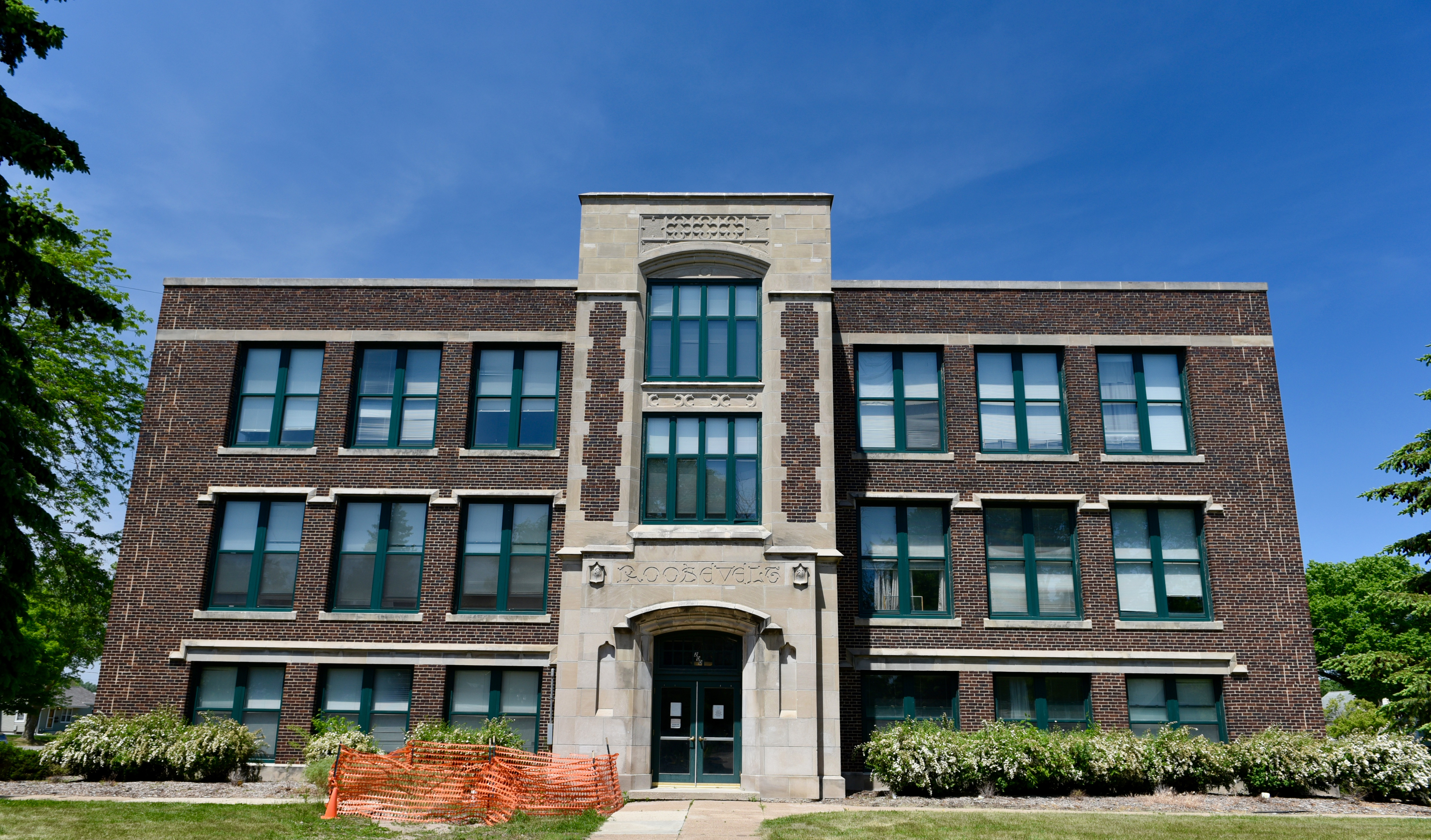

- Location within Iowa Location within the United States
- Location: 200 E. Arlington St. Waterloo, Iowa
- Coordinates: 42°31′8″N 92°20′10″W
- Area: less than one acre
- Built: 1921-22, 1954
- Architect: Cleveland, Mortimer B.
- Architectural style: Late Gothic Revival
- NRHP reference No.: 04001402
- Added to NRHP: December 30, 2004

The Roosevelt Elementary School at 200 E. Arlington St. in Waterloo, Iowa was built during 1921-22 and extended in 1954. It was a Late Gothic Revival architecture work by Waterloo architect Mortimer B. Cleveland.

It was listed on the National Register of Historic Places in 2004. It was deemed significant in the areas of education and architecture. As for education, its library served the local community as well as the school.
