= Loy Young =

American football and basketball coach

Biographical details
- Born: January 21, 1923; Sumner, Iowa, U.S.
- Died: March 25, 2015 (aged 92); Mankato, Minnesota, U.S.
- Education: Minnesota State University

Coaching career (HC unless noted)

Football
- 1950: Dickinson State

Basketball
- 1951–1956: Chadron State

Head coaching record
- Overall: 5–2–1 (football); 84–37 (basketball)

Loy Wayne Young (January 21, 1923 – March 25, 2015) was an American college football and college basketball coach. Young was the fifth head football coach at Dickinson State College—now known as Dickinson State University–in Dickinson, North Dakota, and held that position for one season, in 1950. His coaching record at Dickinson State was 5–2–1. Young was also the head basketball coach at Chadron State College from 1951 to 1956, tallying a mark of 84–37.

== Head coaching record ==
=== Football ===
Year	Team	Overall	Conference	Standing	Bowl/playoffs
Dickinson State Savages (North Dakota Intercollegiate Conference) (1950)
1950	Dickinson State	5–2–1	4–1	T–3rd	
Dickinson State:		5–2–1	4–1		
Total:		5–2–1			
