= Highland Historic District (Waterloo, Iowa) =

Historic district in Iowa, United States

- U.S. National Register of Historic Places
- U.S. Historic district
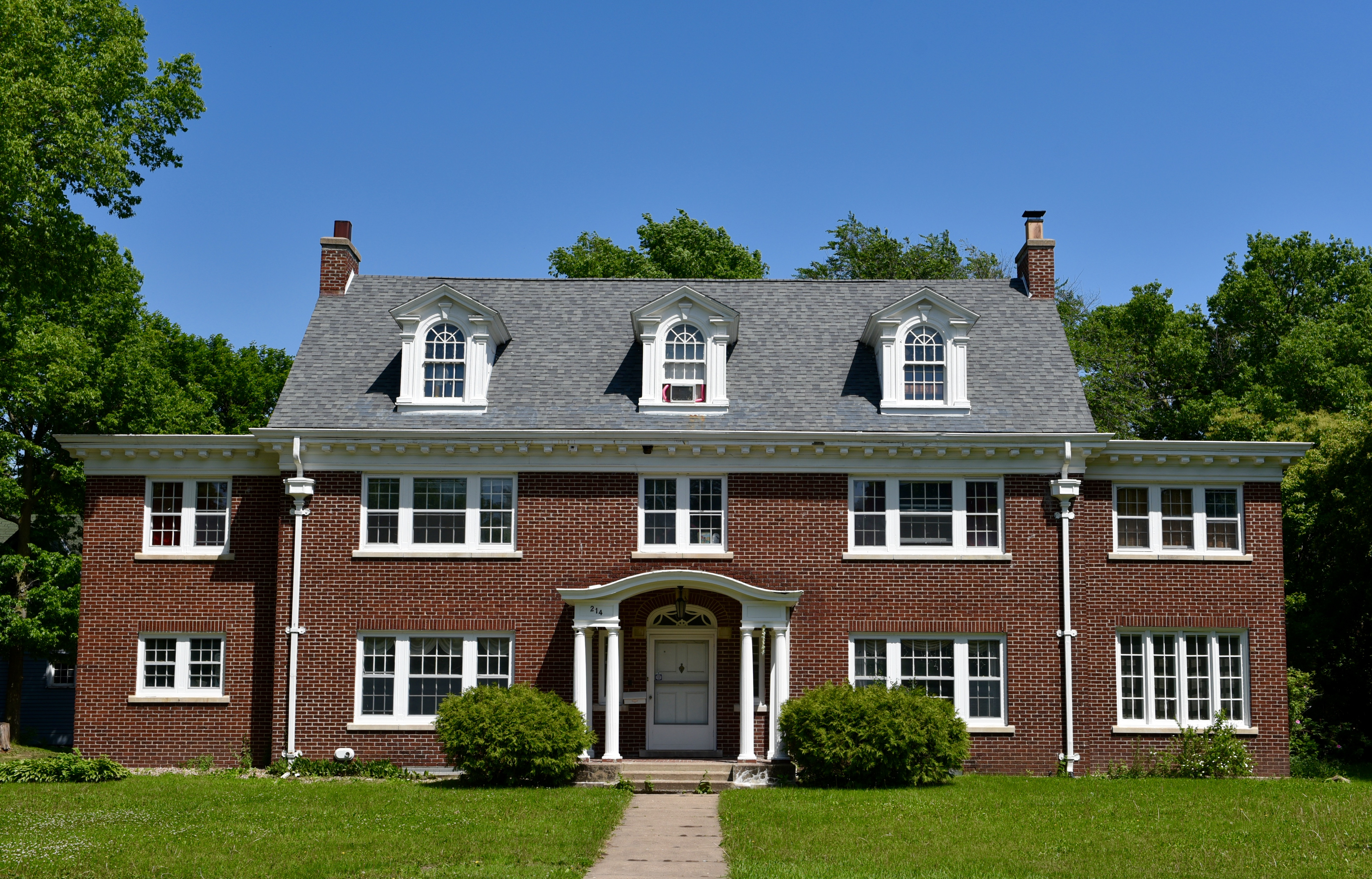
- 214 Highland Blvd.

- Location within Iowa Location within the United States
- Location: Roughly bounded by Independence Ave. and Steely, Idaho, and Vine Sts., Waterloo, Iowa
- Coordinates: 42°30′01″N 92°18′42″W
- Area: 64 acres (26 ha)
- Architect: Mortimer B. Cleveland
- Architectural style: Colonial Revival; American Craftsman
- NRHP reference No.: 84001209
- Added to NRHP: September 24, 1984

The Highland Historic District is a nationally recognized historic district located in Waterloo, Iowa, United States. It was listed on the National Register of Historic Places in 1984. Because of industrial growth the city's population doubled between 1890 and 1900, and then again between 1900 and 1910. The housing development named the Highlands was developed during this period of economic growth. John Steely, a real estate broker, and Lewis Lichty, an attorney who owned the Waterloo Canning Company, bought the property known as sandhill in 1901, and opened an office for the Highland Land Company in the Century Building in 1905. The historic district is all residential buildings. The oldest house predates the development having been built in 1900. Otherwise construction began in the center of the district in 1908 and moved outward. By 1942 all but 15 houses were built. They are all frame construction with exteriors composed of wood, stucco, brick and stone. Styles popular in the district include Colonial Revival, Tudor Revival and American Craftsman. Waterloo architect Mortimer B. Cleveland is responsible for designing at least 39 of the houses here. Chicago landscape architect Howard Evarts Weed designed the Square and boulevard plantings. This was Waterloo's first suburban residential development. It became the enclave for the city's industrial and professional elite in the first half of the 20th century.
