= Maxfield Township, Bremer County, Iowa =

Township in Iowa, US

Maxfield Township, Bremer County
- Township
- Coordinates: 42°41′16″N 092°15′19″W
- Country: United States
- State: Iowa
- County: Bremer

Area
  - Total: 36.4 sq mi (94.3 km^{2})
  - Land: 36.4 sq mi (94.3 km^{2})
  - Water: 0 sq mi (0 km^{2})
- Elevation: 1,010 ft (308 m)

Population (2010)
  - Total: 1,314
  - Density: 36/sq mi (13.9/km^{2})
- Time zone: UTC-6 (Central)
  - Summer (DST): UTC-5 (Central)
- FIPS code: 19-92898
- GNIS feature ID: 0468369

Maxfield Township is one of fourteen townships in Bremer County, Iowa, USA. As of the 2000 census, its population was 1,314.

== Geography ==
Maxfield Township covers an area of 36.41 square miles (94.3 km^{2}) and contains one incorporated settlement, Readlyn. According to the USGS, it contains six cemeteries: Emanuel Evangelical Lutheran, Saint Johns Lutheran, Saint Mathews Lutheran, Saint Pauls (two cemeteries of this name) and Zions.
