= YMCA Building (Waterloo, Iowa) =

- U.S. National Register of Historic Places
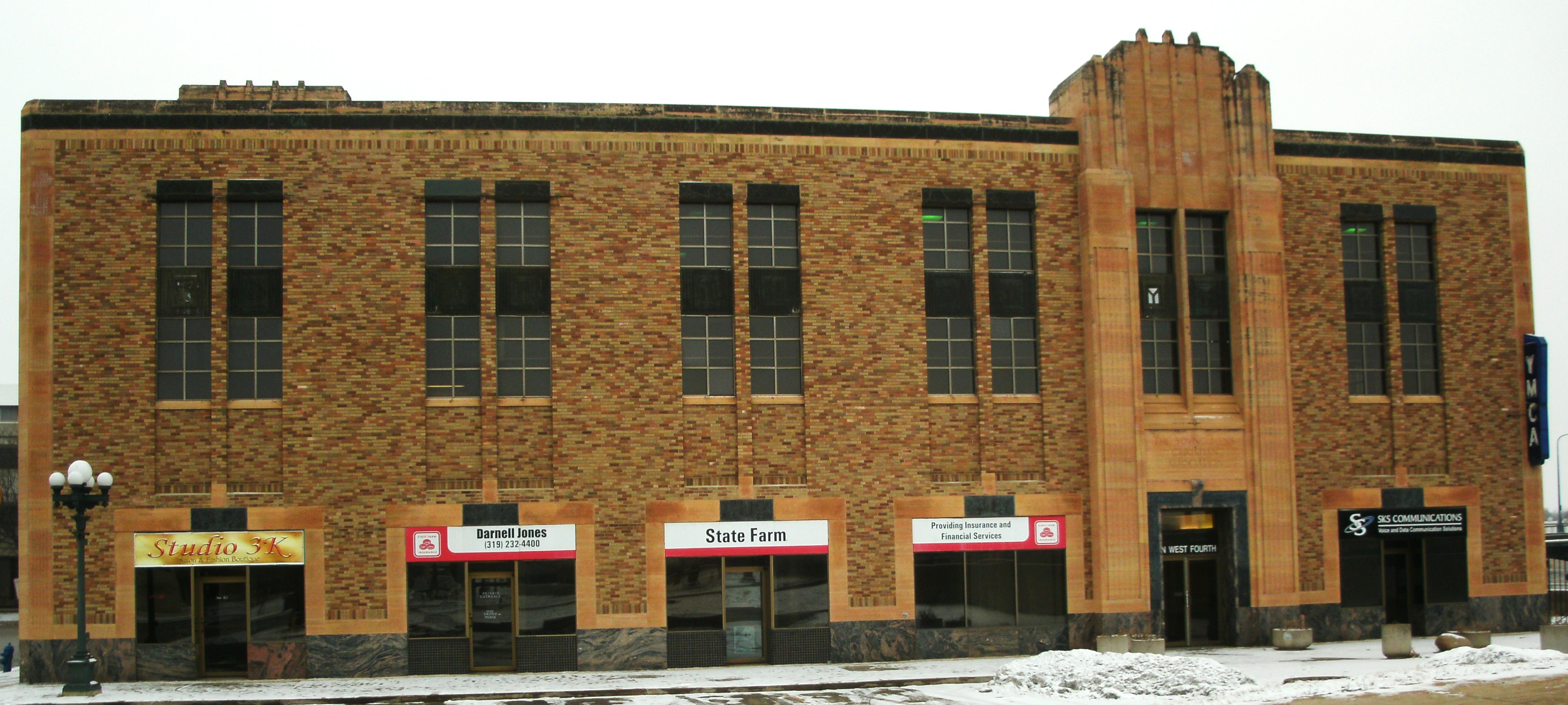

- Location within Iowa Location within the United States
- Location: 154 W. 4th St. Waterloo, Iowa
- Coordinates: 42°29′47.1″N 92°20′20.9″W
- Area: less than one acre
- Built: 1931
- Built by: H.A. Maine
- Architect: Mortimer Cleveland; D.B. Toenjes
- Architectural style: Modern Movement
- NRHP reference No.: 83000343
- Added to NRHP: July 7, 1983

The YMCA Building is a historic building located in Waterloo, Iowa, United States. The local YMCA was established in 1868, three months after the city was incorporated. Its first permanent building was built at this location in 1893. As membership expanded they eventually out grew the building, and it was torn down in 1930. The present building was designed by local architect Mortimer Cleveland and his associate D.B. Toenjes. The general contractor was H.A. Maine Construction. The three-story brick structure features decorative elements from the Art Deco mode. The first level has housed commercial firms in the storefronts. An addition was built onto the west side of the building in 1959 to house adult activities. The local YMCA built a new facility and moved from here in 1982. The following year the building was listed on the National Register of Historic Places. It has been converted into an office building.
