= Harlan Township, Fayette County, Iowa =

Harlan Township
- Township
- Location in Fayette County
- Coordinates: 42°46′51″N 91°54′45″W
- Country: United States
- State: Iowa
- County: Fayette

Area
  - Total: 36.79 sq mi (95.28 km^{2})
  - Land: 36.76 sq mi (95.22 km^{2})
  - Water: 0.027 sq mi (0.07 km^{2}) 0.07%
- Elevation: 1,145 ft (349 m)

Population (2010)
  - Total: 871
  - Density: 23.7/sq mi (9.15/km^{2})
- Time zone: UTC-6 (CST)
  - Summer (DST): UTC-5 (CDT)
- ZIP codes: 50655, 50662, 50681, 52142, 52164
- GNIS feature ID: 0468005

Harlan Township is one of twenty townships in Fayette County, Iowa. As of the 2010 census, its population was 871.

== Geography ==
According to the United States Census Bureau, Harlan Township covers an area of 36.79 square miles (95.28 square kilometers); of this, 36.76 square miles (95.22 square kilometers, 99.94 percent) is land and 0.03 square miles (0.07 square kilometers, 0.07 percent) is water.

=== Cities, towns, villages ===
- Maynard

=== Adjacent townships ===
- Center Township (north)
- Westfield Township (northeast)
- Smithfield Township (east)
- Scott Township (southeast)
- Jefferson Township (south)
- Oran Township (southwest)
- Fremont Township (west)
- Banks Township (northwest)

=== Cemeteries ===
The township contains these two cemeteries: Hope and Long Grove.

=== Major highways ===
- Iowa Highway 150

=== Landmarks ===
- City Park
- Twin Bridges County Park (east quarter)

== School districts ==
- West Central Community School District

== Political districts ==
- Iowa's 1st congressional district
- State House District 18
- State Senate District 9
