= Bert L. Van Gorden =

American politician

Bert Lee Van Gorden
- Born: January 10, 1873; Fredericksburg, Iowa
- Died: June 25, 1941 (aged 68); Taylor, Wisconsin
- Political party: Republican

Bert Lee Van Gorden (January 10, 1873 – June 25, 1941) was an American businessman and politician.

Van Gorden was born in Fredericksburg, Iowa. In 1875, Van Gorden moved with his parents to Jackson County, Wisconsin and settled in Taylor, Wisconsin. He was involved in the banking and general mercantile business. Van Gorden was also involved with the hotel business, the telephone business and the milling business. Van Gorden served on the Jackson County Board of Supervisors and was president of the county board. He also served on the school board and was the board clerk. In 1915 and 1916, Van Gorden served in the Wisconsin Assembly and was a Republican. He died at his home in Taylor, Wisconsin.
