= Le Roy Township, Iowa =

Township in Iowa, US

Le Roy Township, Bremer County
- Township
- Coordinates: 42°51′51″N 092°13′18″W
- Country: United States
- State: Iowa
- County: Bremer

Area
  - Total: 21.61 sq mi (55.97 km^{2})
  - Land: 20.93 sq mi (54.22 km^{2})
  - Water: 0.68 sq mi (1.76 km^{2})
- Elevation: 1,010 ft (308 m)

Population (2010)
  - Total: 189
  - Density: 9.1/sq mi (3.5/km^{2})
- Time zone: UTC-6 (Central)
  - Summer (DST): UTC-5 (Central)
- FIPS code: 19-92424
- GNIS feature ID: 0468207

Le Roy Township is one of fourteen townships in Bremer County, Iowa, USA. At the 2010 census, its population was 189.

== Geography ==
Le Roy Township covers an area of 21.61 square miles (56.0 km^{2}) and contains no incorporated settlements. According to the USGS, it contains five cemeteries: Frederika Township, Le Roy Township, Mentor, Mount Olivet and Pinhook.
