= Washington Township, Bremer County, Iowa =

Township in Iowa, US

Washington Township, Bremer County
- Township
- Coordinates: 42°42′16″N 092°29′14″W
- Country: United States
- State: Iowa
- County: Bremer

Area
  - Total: 19.75 sq mi (51.16 km^{2})
  - Land: 19.74 sq mi (51.13 km^{2})
  - Water: 0.0077 sq mi (0.02 km^{2})
- Elevation: 1,001 ft (305 m)

Population (2010)
  - Total: 607
  - Density: 31/sq mi (11.9/km^{2})
- Time zone: UTC-6 (Central)
  - Summer (DST): UTC-5 (Central)
- FIPS code: 19-94455
- GNIS feature ID: 0468903

Washington Township is one of fourteen townships in Bremer County, Iowa, USA. At the 2010 census, its population was 607.

== Geography ==
Washington Township covers an area of 19.75 square miles (51.2 km^{2}) and contains no incorporated settlements.
