= Fredericksburg Community School District =

Former school district in Iowa

Fredericksburg Community School District was a school district headquartered in Fredericksburg, Iowa.

== History ==
Circa 2002 it had 170 elementary and 197 secondary students. It was the 300th largest school district in Iowa (the state had 374 school districts at the time).

By 1998 the district was sharing two teachers with the Sumner Community School District, and increasing features, including superintendents, became shared due to dropping enrollments that would have otherwise made the schools unable to meet Iowa accreditation standards. The two districts began sharing superintendents in 2003, and that year the districts also agreed to begin sharing schools as part of a whole grade-sharing arrangement. Beginning in the 2004–2005 school year, the two began sharing secondary schools, with Sumner-Fredericksburg High School being established in Sumner and Sumner-Fredericksburg Middle School being established in Fredericksburg.

A merger with the Sumner CSD was approved by an election scheduled on Tuesday February 5, 2013, by 728–25 in the Sumner district and 432–184 in the Fredericksburg district. The merger into the Sumner-Fredericksburg Community School District took effect on July 1, 2014.
