= Dr. Salsbury's Laboratories, Main Office and Production Laboratory Building =

- U.S. National Register of Historic Places
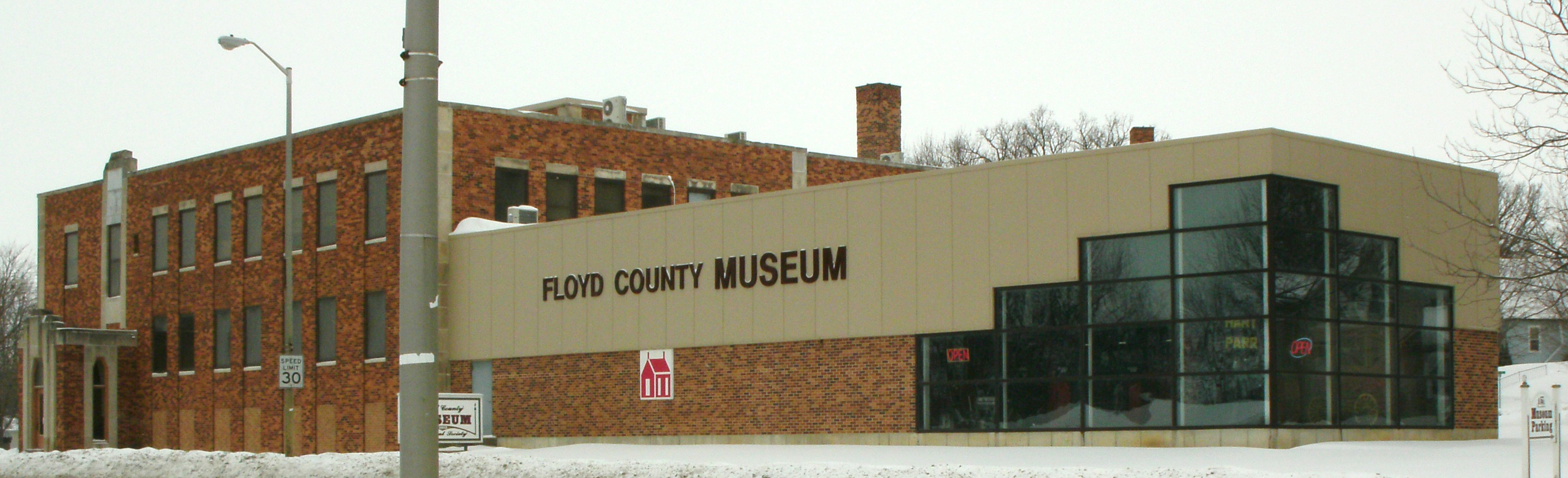
- The historic building is on the left.

- Location within Iowa Location within the United States
- Location: 500 Gilbert St. Charles City, Iowa
- Coordinates: 43°03′47″N 92°40′44″W
- Area: less than one acre
- Built: 1935, 1937
- Built by: C.E. Larson Construction
- Architect: Mortimer Cleveland
- Architectural style: Modern Movement
- NRHP reference No.: 96000235
- Added to NRHP: March 7, 1996

Dr. Salsbury's Laboratories, Main Office and Production Laboratory Building, also known as the Floyd County Museum, is a historic building located in Charles City, Iowa, United States. It was listed on the National Register of Historic Places in 1996. The two-story brick Modern Movement structure is built over a raised basement. It was designed by Waterloo architect Mortimer Cleveland. The facility was built in three parts. Completed in 1935, the part of the building that faces Gilbert Street housed administration and company related operations. The wing off the back was completed two years later, and housed research laboratories and related uses, and offices. To the west of the original block is a single-story wing built after the facility became a museum in the 1990s.

The building's primary significance is its association with the development of health products that made the expansion of the poultry industry possible whereby large numbers of poultry could be concentrated together for poultry and egg production. It is also significant for its association Dr. Joseph E. Salsbury, who established a veterinary practice in Charles City in 1923. He changed attitudes of applying veterinary medicine to poultry when he began to see the value of taking a flock approach rather than focusing on individual birds, which at the time were seen as low-value farm animals. Salsbury ended his general veterinary practice in 1930 to devote his time to providing medicines to farmers who raised poultry and developed this laboratory.
