= Frederika, Iowa =

- City
- Location of Frederika, Iowa
- Coordinates: 42°53′01″N 92°18′22″W
- Country: US
- State: Iowa
- County: Bremer

Area
  - Total: 0.44 sq mi (1.14 km^{2})
  - Land: 0.37 sq mi (0.95 km^{2})
  - Water: 0.073 sq mi (0.19 km^{2})
- Elevation: 1,040 ft (320 m)

Population (2020)
  - Total: 204
  - Density: 556.3/sq mi (214.77/km^{2})
- Time zone: UTC-6 (Central (CST))
  - Summer (DST): UTC-5 (CDT)
- ZIP code: 50631
- Area code: 319
- FIPS code: 19-29010
- GNIS feature ID: 2394817

Frederika is a city in Bremer County, Iowa, United States. The population was 204 at the time of the 2020 census. It is named for Fredrika Bremer (note different spelling), the Swedish author, for whom the surrounding county was also named.

Frederika is part of the Waterloo–Cedar Falls Metropolitan Statistical Area.

== Geography ==
According to the United States Census Bureau, the city has a total area of 0.20 square miles (0.52 km^{2}), all land.

== Demographics ==
Historical populations
Year	Pop.	±%
1880	77	—
1900	170	+120.8%
1910	149	−12.4%
1920	210	+40.9%
1930	204	−2.9%
1940	236	+15.7%
1950	210	−11.0%
1960	249	+18.6%
1970	190	−23.7%
1980	223	+17.4%
1990	188	−15.7%
2000	199	+5.9%
2010	183	−8.0%
2020	204	+11.5%
Source:"U.S. Census website". United States Census Bureau. and Iowa Data Center; Source: U.S. Decennial Census

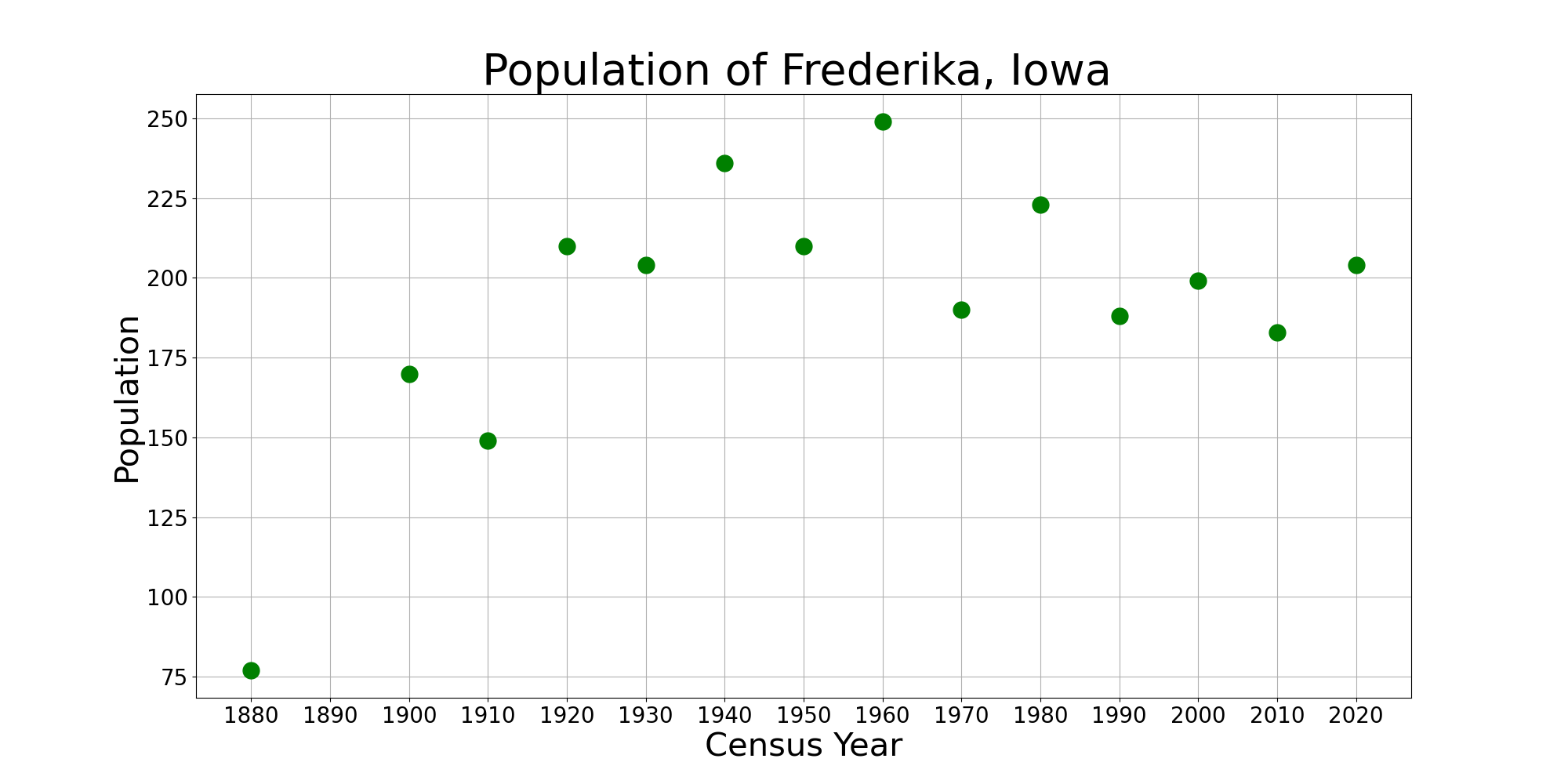
The population of Frederika, Iowa from US census data

=== 2020 census ===
As of the census of 2020, there were 204 people, 98 households, and 54 families residing in the city. The population density was 556.3 inhabitants per square mile (214.8/km^{2}). There were 113 housing units at an average density of 308.1 per square mile (119.0/km^{2}). The racial makeup of the city was 96.6% White, 0.0% Black or African American, 0.0% Native American, 0.0% Asian, 0.0% Pacific Islander, 0.0% from other races and 3.4% from two or more races. Hispanic or Latino persons of any race comprised 1.0% of the population.

Of the 98 households, 23.5% of which had children under the age of 18 living with them, 44.9% were married couples living together, 12.2% were cohabitating couples, 22.4% had a female householder with no spouse or partner present and 20.4% had a male householder with no spouse or partner present. 44.9% of all households were non-families. 35.7% of all households were made up of individuals, 16.3% had someone living alone who was 65 years old or older.

The median age in the city was 47.0 years. 22.5% of the residents were under the age of 20; 2.0% were between the ages of 20 and 24; 24.5% were from 25 and 44; 27.0% were from 45 and 64; and 24.0% were 65 years of age or older. The gender makeup of the city was 49.5% male and 50.5% female.

=== 2010 census ===
As of the census of 2010, there were 183 people, 96 households, and 48 families residing in the city. The population density was 915.0 inhabitants per square mile (353.3/km^{2}). There were 118 housing units at an average density of 590.0 per square mile (227.8/km^{2}). The racial makeup of the city was 98.4% White, 0.5% Native American, and 1.1% Asian.

There were 96 households, of which 12.5% had children under the age of 18 living with them, 42.7% were married couples living together, 6.3% had a female householder with no husband present, 1.0% had a male householder with no wife present, and 50.0% were non-families. 39.6% of all households were made up of individuals, and 15.7% had someone living alone who was 65 years of age or older. The average household size was 1.91 and the average family size was 2.42.

The median age in the city was 49.9 years. 10.9% of residents were under the age of 18; 9.4% were between the ages of 18 and 24; 18.5% were from 25 to 44; 37.2% were from 45 to 64; and 24% were 65 years of age or older. The gender makeup of the city was 53.6% male and 46.4% female.

=== 2000 census ===
As of the census of 2000, there were 199 people, 96 households, and 60 families residing in the city. The population density was 993.6 inhabitants per square mile (383.6/km^{2}). There were 122 housing units at an average density of 609.1 per square mile (235.2/km^{2}). The racial makeup of the city was 99.00% White. Hispanic or Latino of any race were 1.00% of the population.

There were 96 households, out of which 19.8% had children under the age of 18 living with them, 58.3% were married couples living together, 2.1% had a female householder with no husband present, and 37.5% were non-families. 36.5% of all households were made up of individuals, and 25.0% had someone living alone who was 65 years of age or older. The average household size was 2.07 and the average family size was 2.70.

In the city, the population was spread out, with 16.1% under the age of 18, 7.0% from 18 to 24, 20.1% from 25 to 44, 27.6% from 45 to 64, and 29.1% who were 65 years of age or older. The median age was 51 years. For every 100 females, there were 99.0 males. For every 100 females age 18 and over, there were 94.2 males.

The median income for a household in the city was $36,250, and the median income for a family was $47,500. Males had a median income of $30,625 versus $25,500 for females. The per capita income for the city was $20,224. About 10.3% of families and 12.6% of the population were below the poverty line, including 25.8% of those under the age of eighteen and 6.1% of those 65 or over.

== Education ==
The Tripoli Community School District operates local public schools.
