= Douglas Township, Bremer County, Iowa =

Township in Iowa, US

Douglas Township, Bremer County
- Township
- Coordinates: 42°51′38″N 092°22′57″W
- Country: United States
- State: Iowa
- County: Bremer

Area
  - Total: 36.83 sq mi (95.39 km^{2})
  - Land: 36.81 sq mi (95.35 km^{2})
  - Water: 0.015 sq mi (0.04 km^{2})
- Elevation: 1,070 ft (326 m)

Population (2010)
  - Total: 388
  - Density: 11/sq mi (4.1/km^{2})
- Time zone: UTC-6 (Central)
  - Summer (DST): UTC-5 (Central)
- FIPS code: 19-91032
- GNIS feature ID: 0467726

Douglas Township is one of fourteen townships in Bremer County, Iowa, USA. At the 2010 census, its population was 388.

== Geography ==
Douglas Township covers an area of 36.83 square miles (95.4 km^{2}) and contains no incorporated settlements. According to the USGS, it contains four cemeteries: Alcock, Saint Johns Lutheran, St. John's United Church of Christ of Siegel and Saint Pauls Lutheran.
