= Warren Township, Bremer County, Iowa =

Township in Iowa, US

Warren Township, Bremer County
- Township
- Coordinates: 42°45′58″N 092°22′51″W
- Country: United States
- State: Iowa
- County: Bremer

Area
  - Total: 36.66 sq mi (94.95 km^{2})
  - Land: 36.66 sq mi (94.95 km^{2})
  - Water: 0 sq mi (0 km^{2})
- Elevation: 1,040 ft (317 m)

Population (2010)
  - Total: 561
  - Density: 15/sq mi (5.9/km^{2})
- Time zone: UTC-6 (Central)
  - Summer (DST): UTC-5 (Central)
- FIPS code: 19-94425
- GNIS feature ID: 0468893

Warren Township is one of fourteen townships in Bremer County, Iowa, USA. At the 2010 census, its population was 561.

== Geography ==
Warren Township covers an area of 36.66 square miles (94.9 km^{2}) and contains no incorporated settlements. According to the USGS, it contains three cemeteries: County Farm, Warren and Warren Evangelical.
