= Polk Township, Bremer County, Iowa =

Township in Iowa, US

Polk Township, Bremer County
- Township
- Coordinates: 42°51′35″N 092°29′36″W
- Country: United States
- State: Iowa
- County: Bremer

Area
  - Total: 36.75 sq mi (95.17 km^{2})
  - Land: 36.73 sq mi (95.13 km^{2})
  - Water: 0.019 sq mi (0.05 km^{2})
- Elevation: 968 ft (295 m)

Population (2010)
  - Total: 922
  - Density: 25/sq mi (9.7/km^{2})
- Time zone: UTC-6 (Central)
  - Summer (DST): UTC-5 (Central)
- FIPS code: 19-93441
- GNIS feature ID: 0468555

Polk Township is one of fourteen townships in Bremer County, Iowa, USA. As of the 2010 census, its population was 922.

== Geography ==
Polk Township covers an area of 36.75 square miles (95.2 km^{2}) and contains one incorporated settlement, Plainfield. The hamlet of Horton is situated southeast of the intersection of 140th Street (State Route 188) and Easton Avenue. According to the USGS, Polk Township contains three cemeteries: Horton, Jackson and Willow Lawn.
