= Fairbank Township, Buchanan County, Iowa =

Township in Iowa, US

Fairbank Township, Buchanan County
- Township
- Coordinates: 42°35′58″N 092°01′18″W
- Country: United States
- State: Iowa
- County: Buchanan

Area
  - Total: 36.39 sq mi (94.24 km^{2})
  - Land: 36.37 sq mi (94.19 km^{2})
  - Water: 0.019 sq mi (0.05 km^{2})
- Elevation: 978 ft (298 m)

Population (2000)
  - Total: 1,774
  - Density: 49/sq mi (18.8/km^{2})
- FIPS code: 19-91266
- GNIS feature ID: 0467806

Fairbank Township is one of sixteen townships in Buchanan County, Iowa, United States. As of the 2000 census, its population was 1,774.

== History ==
The first white child was born in Fairbank Township in 1855.

== Geography ==
Fairbank Township covers an area of 36.39 square miles (94.2 km^{2}) and contains one incorporated settlement, Fairbank. According to the USGS, it contains three cemeteries: Amish, North Amish and Union.
