= Sumner, Iowa =

- City
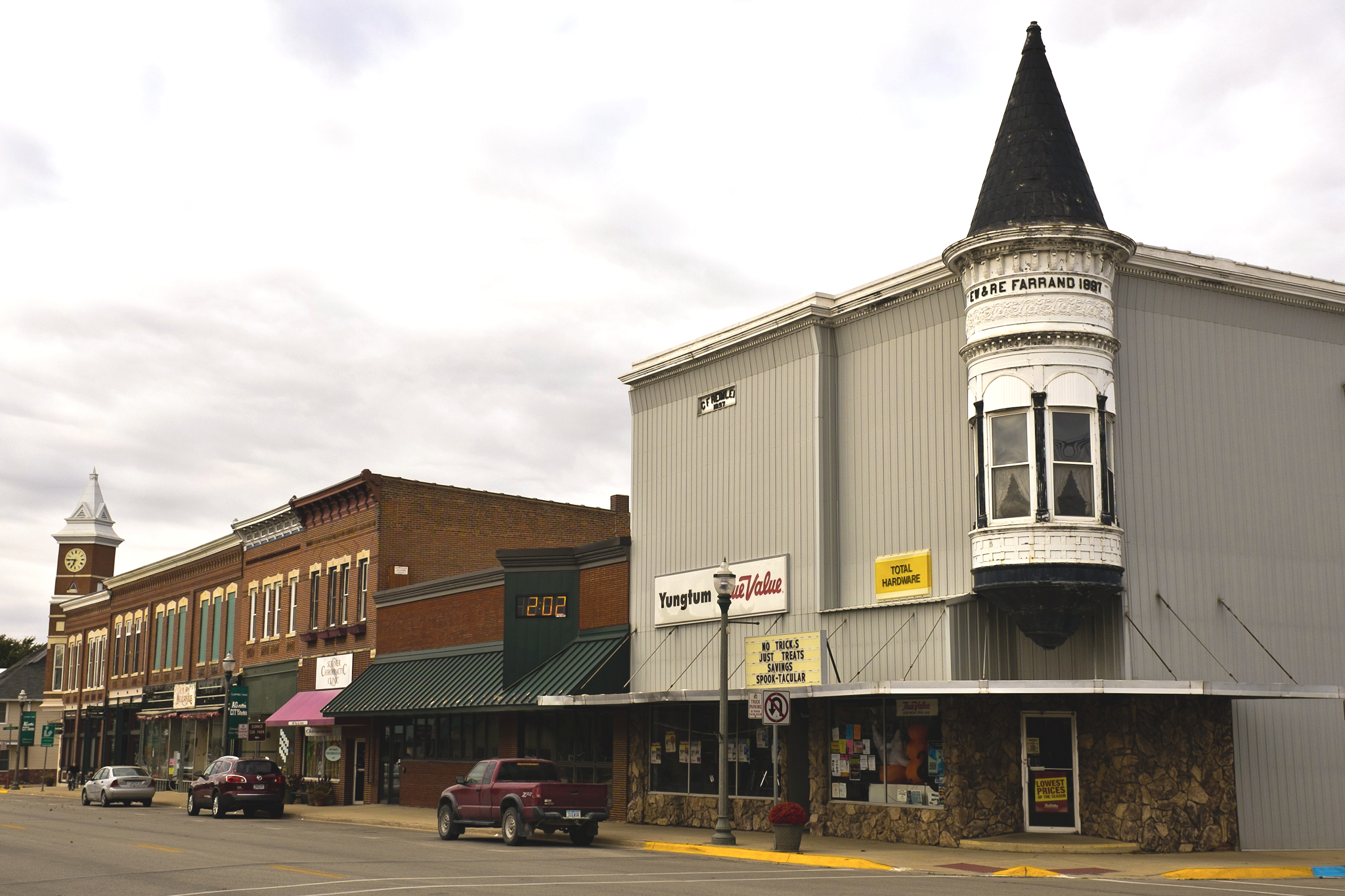
- Downtown Sumner

- Location of Sumner, Iowa
- Coordinates: 42°50′59″N 92°05′49″W
- Country: United States
- State: Iowa
- Counties: Bremer, Fayette

Area
  - Total: 2.47 sq mi (6.40 km^{2})
  - Land: 2.46 sq mi (6.37 km^{2})
  - Water: 0.012 sq mi (0.03 km^{2})
- Elevation: 1,063 ft (324 m)

Population (2020)
  - Total: 2,030
  - Density: 825.6/sq mi (318.76/km^{2})
- Time zone: UTC-6 (Central (CST))
  - Summer (DST): UTC-5 (CDT)
- ZIP code: 50674
- Area code: 563
- FIPS code: 19-76260
- GNIS feature ID: 468764
- Website: www.mysumneriowa.com

Sumner is a city in Bremer County, Iowa, United States. The city is located along the county's eastern border, between Bremer and Fayette counties. The population was 2,030 at the time of the 2020 census. The Bremer County portion of Sumner is part of the Waterloo–Cedar Falls Metropolitan Statistical Area.

The town was established in 1870, and incorporated in 1894. The community is named after American political leader Charles Sumner.

Sumner is home to Life Line Emergency Vehicles, a major manufacturer of ambulances.

== Geography ==
According to the United States Census Bureau, the city has a total area of 2.53 square miles (6.55 km^{2}), of which, 2.52 square miles (6.53 km^{2}) is land and 0.01 square miles (0.03 km^{2}) is water.

Sumner is located on Iowa Highway 93.

== Demographics ==
Historical populations
Year	Pop.	±%
1880	285	—
1890	861	+202.1%
1900	1,437	+66.9%
1910	1,404	−2.3%
1920	1,511	+7.6%
1930	1,561	+3.3%
1940	1,752	+12.2%
1950	1,911	+9.1%
1960	2,170	+13.6%
1970	2,174	+0.2%
1980	2,335	+7.4%
1990	2,078	−11.0%
2000	2,106	+1.3%
2010	2,028	−3.7%
2020	2,030	+0.1%
Source:"U.S. Census website". United States Census Bureau. and Iowa Data Center; Source: U.S. Decennial Census

=== 2020 census ===
As of the 2020 census, Sumner had a population of 2,030, with 853 households and 517 families residing in the city. The population density was 825.6 inhabitants per square mile (318.8/km^{2}), and there were 938 housing units at an average density of 381.5 per square mile (147.3/km^{2}).

The median age was 43.6 years. 24.2% of residents were under the age of 18 and 24.8% were 65 years of age or older; 4.3% were between the ages of 20 and 24, 21.4% were from 25 to 44, and 23.6% were from 45 to 64. The gender makeup of the city was 47.0% male and 53.0% female. For every 100 females there were 88.7 males, and for every 100 females age 18 and over there were 85.5 males age 18 and over. 0.0% of residents lived in urban areas, while 100.0% lived in rural areas.

Of the 853 households, 26.5% had children under the age of 18 living with them. Of all households, 49.0% were married-couple households, 6.6% were cohabitating couple households, 16.4% were households with a male householder and no spouse or partner present, and 28.0% were households with a female householder and no spouse or partner present. About 39.4% of households were non-families, 33.8% of all households were made up of individuals, and 16.8% had someone living alone who was 65 years of age or older.

Of all housing units, 9.1% were vacant. The homeowner vacancy rate was 3.8% and the rental vacancy rate was 10.0%.

Racial composition as of the 2020 census
Race	Number	Percent
White	1,922	94.7%
Black or African American	2	0.1%
American Indian and Alaska Native	8	0.4%
Asian	6	0.3%
Native Hawaiian and Other Pacific Islander	0	0.0%
Some other race	23	1.1%
Two or more races	69	3.4%
Hispanic or Latino (of any race)	53	2.6%

=== 2010 census ===
As of the census of 2010, there were 2,028 people, 869 households, and 555 families living in the city. The population density was 804.8 inhabitants per square mile (310.7/km^{2}). There were 944 housing units at an average density of 374.6 per square mile (144.6/km^{2}). The racial makeup of the city was 98.5% White, 0.8% Asian, 0.1% from other races, and 0.6% from two or more races. Hispanic or Latino of any race were 0.7% of the population.

There were 869 households, of which 27.0% had children under the age of 18 living with them, 53.4% were married couples living together, 7.6% had a female householder with no husband present, 2.9% had a male householder with no wife present, and 36.1% were non-families. 33.0% of all households were made up of individuals, and 18.3% had someone living alone who was 65 years of age or older. The average household size was 2.24 and the average family size was 2.83.

The median age in the city was 45.3 years. 22% of residents were under the age of 18; 5.9% were between the ages of 18 and 24; 21.7% were from 25 to 44; 25% were from 45 to 64; and 25.4% were 65 years of age or older. The gender makeup of the city was 45.8% male and 54.2% female.

=== 2000 census ===
As of the census of 2000, there were 2,106 people, 888 households, and 575 families living in the city. The population density was 833.8 inhabitants per square mile (321.9/km^{2}). There were 930 housing units at an average density of 368.2 per square mile (142.2/km^{2}). The racial makeup of the city was 98.96% White, 0.19% African American, 0.43% Asian, 0.05% Pacific Islander, 0.09% from other races, and 0.28% from two or more races. Hispanic or Latino of any race were 0.66% of the population.

There were 888 households, out of which 27.1% had children under the age of 18 living with them, 55.9% were married couples living together, 6.3% had a female householder with no husband present, and 35.2% were non-families. 32.1% of all households were made up of individuals, and 20.6% had someone living alone who was 65 years of age or older. The average household size was 2.28 and the average family size was 2.88.

In the city, the population was spread out, with 22.9% under the age of 18, 6.1% from 18 to 24, 22.9% from 25 to 44, 23.2% from 45 to 64, and 24.9% who were 65 years of age or older. The median age was 44 years. For every 100 females, there were 88.5 males. For every 100 females age 18 and over, there were 80.4 males.

The median income for a household in the city was $33,417, and the median income for a family was $44,318. Males had a median income of $29,224 versus $20,901 for females. The per capita income for the city was $18,029. About 2.2% of families and 4.2% of the population were below the poverty line, including 5.3% of those under age 18 and 5.4% of those age 65 or over.

== Historic sites ==
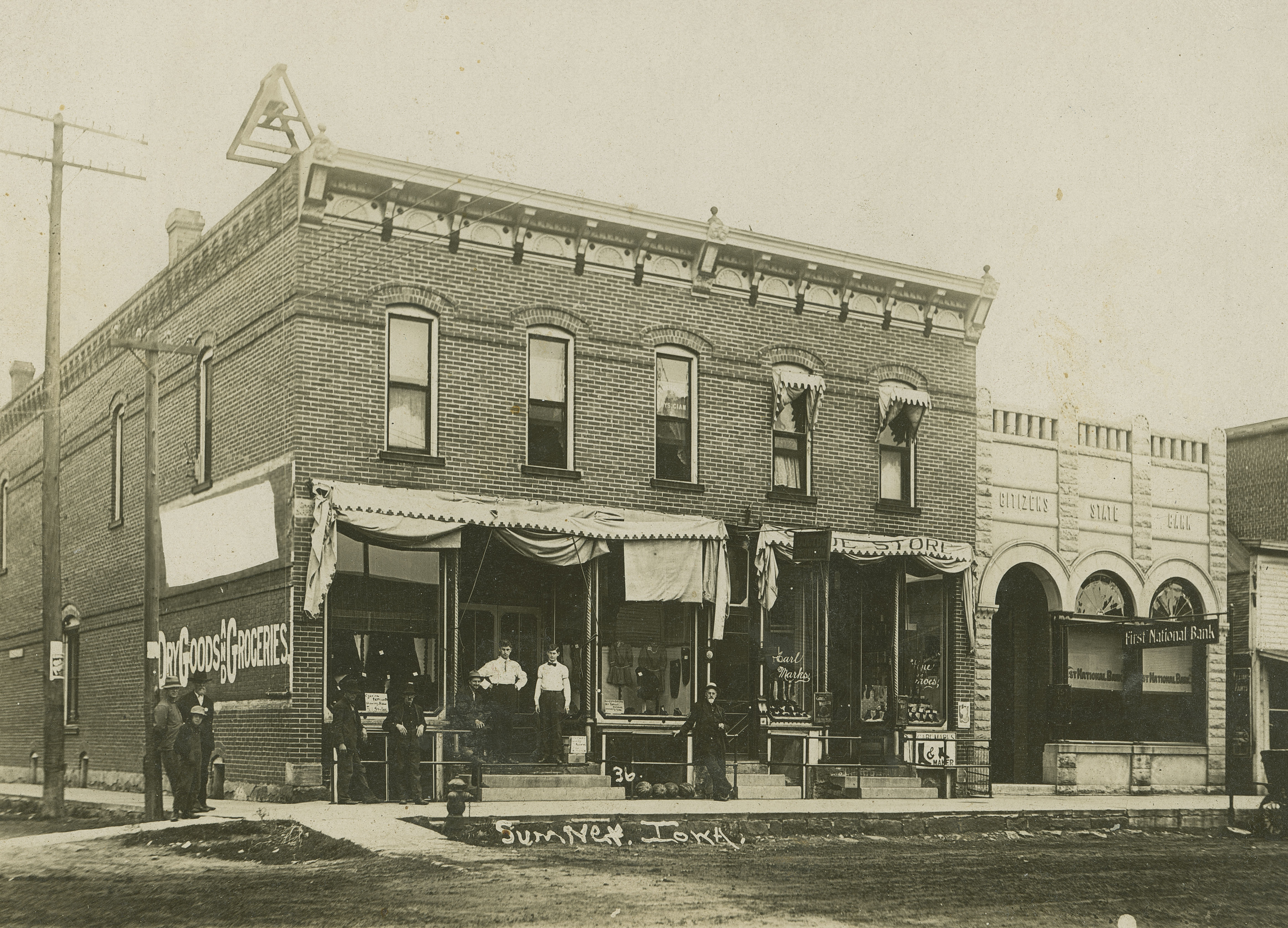
Mainstreet, 1910

There are many historic buildings in Sumner, including the old bank/clock tower, and the old school building, which was built in 1901 and is currently a museum. Sumner has recently built a new library, recreation center, and a park for residents.

== Education ==
It is within the Sumner-Fredericksburg Community School District, which was formed by the merger of Sumner Community School District and Fredericksburg Community School District in 2014. Sumner-Fredericksburg High School in Sumner is the community high school.

== Notable people ==
- Mary Louise Boehm - pianist and painter.
- Randi Oakes, actress and model, best known for her role as Officer Bonnie Clark on the television series CHiPs.
- Les Tietje, baseball pitcher with the Chicago White Sox and St. Louis Browns.
- Loy Young, college football coach.
