= Franklin Township, Bremer County, Iowa =

Township in Iowa, US

Franklin Township, Bremer County
- Township
- Coordinates: 42°40′51″N 092°08′24″W
- Country: United States
- State: Iowa
- County: Bremer

Area
  - Total: 36.27 sq mi (93.94 km^{2})
  - Land: 36.19 sq mi (93.72 km^{2})
  - Water: 0.085 sq mi (0.22 km^{2})
- Elevation: 978 ft (298 m)

Population (2010)
  - Total: 429
  - Density: 12/sq mi (4.6/km^{2})
- Time zone: UTC-6 (Central)
  - Summer (DST): UTC-5 (Central)
- FIPS code: 19-91389
- GNIS feature ID: 0467850

Franklin Township is one of fourteen townships in Bremer County, Iowa, USA. At the 2010 census, its population was 429.

== Geography ==
Franklin Township covers an area of 36.27 square miles (93.9 km^{2}) and contains no incorporated settlements. According to the USGS, it contains two cemeteries: Grove Hill and Saint Peter.
