= Sumner-Fredericksburg High School =

Public secondary school in Sumner, Iowa, United States

Location
- 802 West 6th Street; Sumner, Iowa 50674; United States; 42.8530°N 92.1073°W

Information
- Type: Public Secondary
- Motto: "Committed to continued excellence in lifelong learning, leadership, and character"
- Established: 2004
- School district: Sumner-Fredericksburg Community School District
- Superintendent: Ryan Cunningham
- NCES School ID: 192760001610
- Principal: Bruce Wall
- Teaching staff: 20.06 (on FTE basis)
- Grades: 9 to 12
- Enrollment: 245 (2023–2024)
- Student to teacher ratio: 12.21
- Colors: Blue, Green and Gold
- Athletics conference: North Iowa Cedar League
- Mascot: Cougars
- Nickname: S-F, Sumner-Fred
- Website: SFHS homepage

Sumner-Fredericksburg High School is a rural public high school located in Sumner, Iowa, United States. It is one of four schools within the Sumner-Fredericksburg Community School District. It was a part of the Sumner Community School District until it consolidated with the Fredericksburg Community School District in 2014.

== History ==
Sumner-Fredericksburg High School was established in 2004. It originated from the merger between the Sumner CSD and Fredericksburg CSD. Sumner-Fredericksburg High School is located in Sumner along with Durant Elementary School.

The schools' colors and mascot was chosen from a survey taken from all students in the newly combined district. From this survey, the students chose Cougars to be the mascot and the colors: Navy Blue, Forest Green, and Vegas Gold. In its first year, Sumner-Fredericksburg joined the Upper Iowa Conference. As schools in the Upper Iowa Conference continued to shrink and join together, Sumner-Fredericksburg received an invitation to join the North Iowa Cedar League. In 2014, Sumner-Fredericksburg joined the North Iowa Cedar League East Division, where it joined schools of similar size. In 2022, the school was invited to join the Upper Iowa Conference and the Northeast Iowa Conference. The school has yet to respond to both invitations.

== Athletics and activities ==
The Cougars, a member of the North Iowa Cedar League, has the following athletics.

- Football
- Volleyball
  - 2015 Class 2A Runner-Ups
- Basketball
- Wrestling (boys and girls)
- Cross Country
- Track and field
  - Girls' 2018 Class 2A Runner-Ups
- Golf
  - Girls' 2006 Class 2A State Champions
  - Girls' 2022 Class 2A State Champions
- Baseball
- Softball
- Bowling
- Cheerleading
- Soccer (Shared with Tripoli Community School District and Oelwein Community School District)

Sumner-Fredericksburg has the following activities/clubs.

- FCCLA (Family Community Career Leaders of America)
- Student Senate
- Get A Grip
- FFA (The National FFA Organization)
- Speech (Individual and Group)
- NHS (National Honor Society)
- Instrumental Music (Marching Band, Pep Band, Jazz Band, Honor Band)
- Choir
- Sensations Show Choir
- Spanish Club
- Wellness Committee

== See also ==
- List of high schools in Iowa
