= Hazleton Township, Buchanan County, Iowa =

Township in Iowa, US

Hazleton Township, Buchanan County
- Township
- Coordinates: 42°35′57″N 091°54′16″W
- Country: United States
- State: Iowa
- County: Buchanan

Area
  - Total: 36.36 sq mi (94.16 km^{2})
  - Land: 36.27 sq mi (93.95 km^{2})
  - Water: 0.081 sq mi (0.21 km^{2})
- Elevation: 981 ft (299 m)

Population (2000)
  - Total: 1,733
  - Density: 48/sq mi (18.4/km^{2})
- FIPS code: 19-91902
- GNIS feature ID: 0468025

Hazleton Township is one of sixteen townships in Buchanan County, Iowa, United States. As of the 2000 census, its population was 1,733.

== Geography ==
Hazleton Township covers an area of 36.36 square miles (94.2 km^{2}) and contains one incorporated settlement, Hazleton. The unincorporated community of Bryantsburg is also located in the township. According to the USGS, it contains five cemeteries: Floral Hills Memorial Gardens, Fontana, Hazleton, Kint and Saint Marys.
