= Sumner-Fredericksburg Community School District =

Public school district in Sumner, Iowa, United States

Coordinates: 42.853118°N 92.107152°W

Location
- Sumner, Iowa Bremer, Chickasaw, and Fayette counties United States
- Coordinates: 42.853118, -92.107152

District information
- Type: Local school district
- Grades: K-12
- Established: 2014
- Superintendent: Ryan Cunningham
- Schools: 4
- Budget: $12,623,000 (2020-21)
- NCES District ID: 1927600

Students and staff
- Students: 809 (2022-23)
- Teachers: 61.69 FTE
- Staff: 65.82 FTE
- Student–teacher ratio: 13.11
- Athletic conference: North Iowa Cedar League
- District mascot: Cougars
- Colors: Navy, Gold, and Green

Other information
- Website: www.sfcougars.org

Sumner-Fredericksburg Community School District (SFCSD) is a school district headquartered in Iowa, serving Sumner and Fredericksburg and the surrounding rural areas. It spans sections of Bremer, Chickasaw, and Fayette counties.

It was established on July 1, 2014, as a merger of the Sumner Community School District and Fredericksburg Community School District, which already shared schools together as part of a whole grade-sharing agreement. The merger was approved by an election scheduled on Tuesday February 5, 2013, by 728–25 in the Sumner district and 432–184 in the Fredericksburg district.

During a two-year period after the merger, two area education agencies, Area Education Agency 267, which served the previous Sumner district, Keystone Area Education Agency (AEA 1), which served the previous Fredericksburg district, worked together to oversee the newly merged district. After the transition period, only AEA 267 was to oversee the merged district.

== Schools ==
- Sumner-Fredericksburg High School (Sumner)
- Sumner-Fredericksburg Middle School (Fredericksburg)
- Durant Elementary School (Sumner)
- Fredericksburg Elementary School (Fredericksburg)

The Sumner-Fredericksburg Middle School is located in the former Fredericksburg High School building.

== See also ==
- List of school districts in Iowa
