= Sumner No. 2 Township, Iowa =

Township in Iowa, US

Sumner No. 2 Township, Bremer County
- Township
- Coordinates: 42°52′17″N 092°07′53″W
- Country: United States
- State: Iowa
- County: Bremer

Area
  - Total: 30.2 sq mi (78.1 km^{2})
  - Land: 30.14 sq mi (78.07 km^{2})
  - Water: 0.012 sq mi (0.03 km^{2})
- Elevation: 1,109 ft (338 m)

Population (2010)
  - Total: 322
  - Density: 11/sq mi (4.1/km^{2})
- Time zone: UTC-6 (Central)
  - Summer (DST): UTC-5 (Central)
- FIPS code: 19-94059
- GNIS feature ID: 0468769

Sumner No. 2 Township is one of fourteen townships in Bremer County, Iowa, USA. At the 2010 census, its population was 322.

== Geography ==
Sumner No. 2 Township covers an area of 30.15 square miles (78.1 km^{2}) and contains no incorporated settlements. According to the USGS, it contains four cemeteries: Saint John, Saint Johns, Wilson Grove and Zion.
