= Dayton Township, Bremer County, Iowa =

Township in Iowa, US

Dayton Township, Bremer County
- Township
- Coordinates: 42°46′29″N 092°08′10″W
- Country: United States
- State: Iowa
- County: Bremer

Area
  - Total: 36.63 sq mi (94.86 km^{2})
  - Land: 36.51 sq mi (94.55 km^{2})
  - Water: 0.12 sq mi (0.31 km^{2})
- Elevation: 1,053 ft (321 m)

Population (2010)
  - Total: 380
  - Density: 10/sq mi (4/km^{2})
- Time zone: UTC-6 (Central)
  - Summer (DST): UTC-5 (Central)
- FIPS code: 19-90900
- GNIS feature ID: 0467682

Dayton Township is one of fourteen townships in Bremer County, Iowa, United States. At the 2010 census, its population was 380.

== Geography ==
Dayton Township covers an area of 36.63 square miles (94.9 km^{2}) and contains no incorporated settlements. According to the USGS, it contains two cemeteries: Saint Johns Evangelical Lutheran and Saint Pauls United Church of Christ.
