= Chickasaw Township, Chickasaw County, Iowa =

Chickasaw Township
- Township
- Location in Chickasaw County
- Coordinates: 43°02′10″N 092°29′31″W
- Country: United States
- State: Iowa
- County: Chickasaw

Area
  - Total: 36.66 sq mi (94.96 km^{2})
  - Land: 36.66 sq mi (94.94 km^{2})
  - Water: 0.0077 sq mi (0.02 km^{2}) 0.02%
- Elevation: 1,056 ft (322 m)

Population (2000)
  - Total: 784
  - Density: 21/sq mi (8.3/km^{2})
- GNIS feature ID: 0467599

Chickasaw Township is one of twelve townships in Chickasaw County, Iowa, United States. As of the 2000 census, its population was 784.

== History ==
Chickasaw Township was organized in 1855.

== Geography ==
Chickasaw Township covers an area of 36.67 square miles (95.0 km^{2}) and contains two incorporated settlements: Bassett and Ionia. According to the USGS, it contains three cemeteries: Cedar View, Rowley Hill and Saint Boniface.

The stream of Beaver Creek runs through this township.
