= Jerico, Iowa =

- Unincorporated community
- Location within Iowa
- Coordinates: 43°11′05″N 92°15′31″W
- Country: United States
- State: Iowa
- County: Chickasaw
- Elevation: 1,142 ft (348 m)
- Time zone: UTC-6 (Central (CST))
  - Summer (DST): UTC-5 (CDT)
- Area code: 641
- GNIS feature ID: 457944

Jerico is an unincorporated community in Chickasaw County, in the U.S. state of Iowa.

== Geography ==
Jerico lies at the intersection of County Road B22 (120th Street) and Odessa Avenue, on the east bank of Crane Creek, at the intersection of sections 27, 28, 33, and 34 of Jacksonville Township. It is 13 miles (21 km) from the county seat, New Hampton.

It is south of the Jerico Wildlife Area.

== History ==
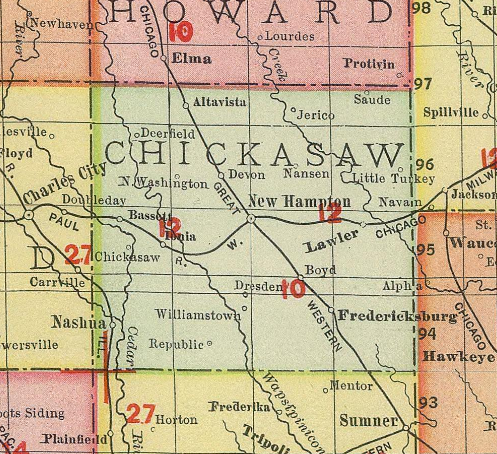
Jerico in Chickasaw County, Iowa, in 1903

A post office was established at Jerico in 1886, and remained in operation until 1908.

Jerico was platted in Section 34 of Jacksonville Township, in the north-central part of the township.

Jerico Lutheran Church was founded in 1867 by Norwegian settlers in Jerico, under Reverend U.V. Koren. The Jerico church still holds services.

Jerico's population was 62 residents in 1902, and the community had 28 residents in 1925. The population was 18 in 1940.

== See also ==
- Republic, Iowa
