= Washington Township, Chickasaw County, Iowa =

Washington Township
- Township
- Location in Chickasaw County
- Coordinates: 43°08′45″N 092°22′36″W
- Country: United States
- State: Iowa
- County: Chickasaw

Area
  - Total: 53.69 sq mi (139.05 km^{2})
  - Land: 53.69 sq mi (139.05 km^{2})
  - Water: 0 sq mi (0 km^{2}) 0%
- Elevation: 1,171 ft (357 m)

Population (2000)
  - Total: 954
  - Density: 18/sq mi (6.9/km^{2})
- GNIS feature ID: 0468909

Washington Township is one of twelve townships in Chickasaw County, Iowa, USA. As of the 2000 census, its population was 954.

== Geography ==
Washington Township covers an area of 53.69 square miles (139.1 km^{2}) and contains two incorporated settlements: Alta Vista and North Washington. According to the USGS, it contains four cemeteries: Calvary, Eggleston Farm, Saint Marys and Union.

== Transportation ==
Washington Township contains one airport or landing strip, New Hampton Municipal Airport.
