= Ryan Kriener =

American basketball player (born 1998)

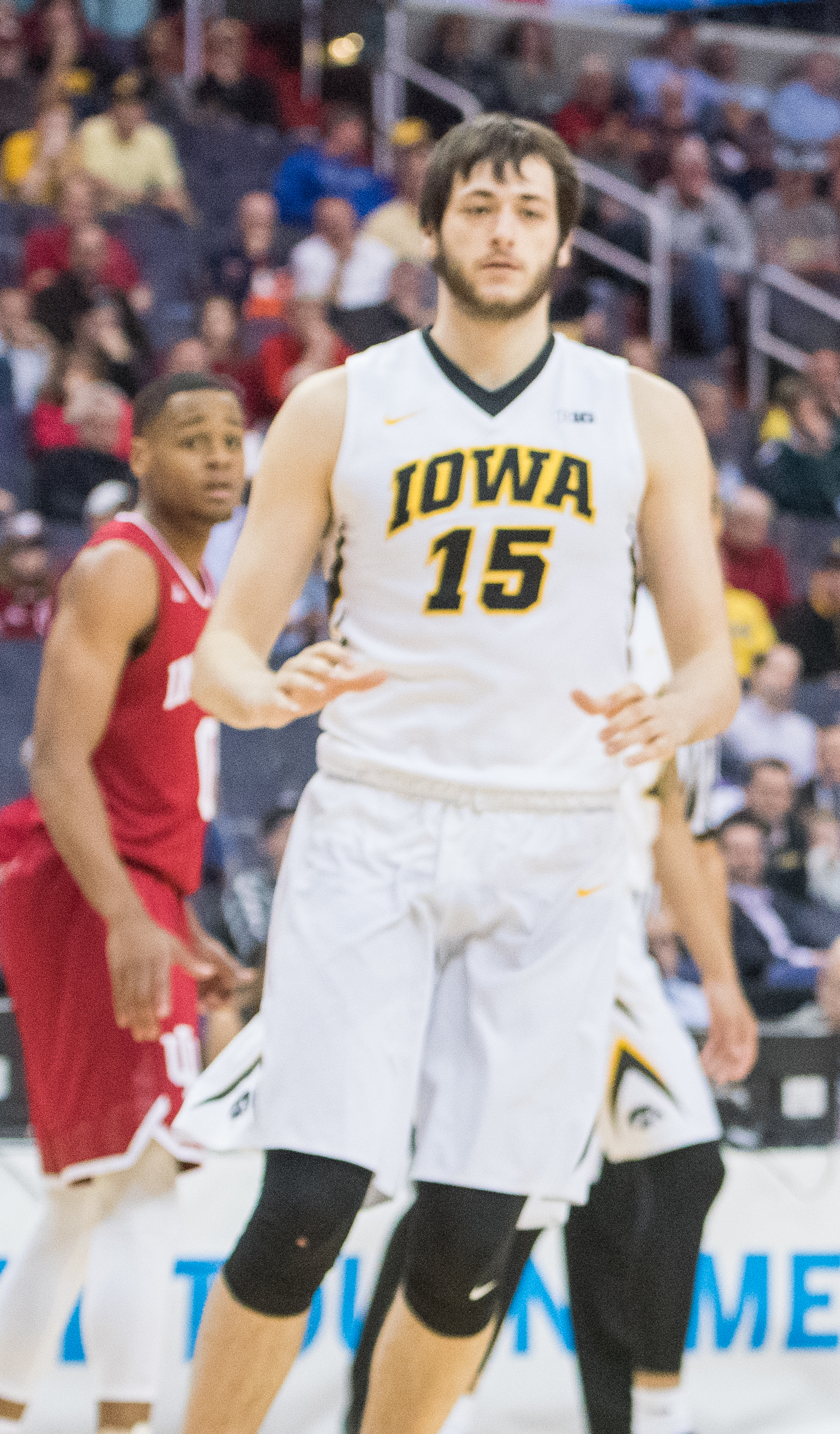

No. 5 – Levanga Hokkaido
- Position: Power forward
- League: B.League

Personal information
- Born: April 24, 1998 (age 28)
- Listed height: 6 ft 10 in (2.08 m)
- Listed weight: 255 lb (116 kg)

Career information
- High school: New Hampton (New Hampton, Iowa); Spirit Lake (Spirit Lake, Iowa)
- College: Iowa (2016–2020)
- NBA draft: 2020: undrafted
- Playing career: 2021–present

Career history
- 2021: Leuven Bears
- 2021–2023: Ehime Orange Vikings
- 2023–2024: Shiga Lakes
- 2024–present: Levanga Hokkaido

Ryan Christopher Kriener (born April 24, 1998) is an American professional basketball player for the Levanga Hokkaido of the Japanese B.League. He played college basketball for Iowa.

== Early life ==
Kriener grew up in Spirit Lake, Iowa and began playing organized basketball in first grade. He began his high school career at New Hampton High School and averaged 12.3 points and 5.5 rebounds per game as a sophomore. As a junior, Kriener transferred to Spirit Lake High School and averaged 19.8 points and 8.5 rebounds per game, shooting 71.3 percent from the field. As a senior, Kriener averaged 22.4 points and 11.8 rebounds per game. He was named to the First Team All-State. Kriener played AAU basketball for Martin Brothers alongside future Iowa teammates Jordan Bohannon and Cordell Pemsl. Kreiner received 23 collegiate offers and took a visit to Nebraska, but ultimately signed with Iowa.

== College career ==
As a freshman, Kriener averaged 3.1 points and 2.2 rebounds per game. Kriener's sophomore season was derailed by two concussions and several injuries. He averaged 3.6 points and 1.9 rebounds per game. As a junior, Kriener averaged 5.7 points and 3.0 rebounds per game and had 15 points and 10 rebounds in a home win over Michigan. He largely came off the bench as a senior but started six games when CJ Fredrick was injured. On December 29, 2019, Kriener scored a career-high 20 points against Kennesaw State. On February 25, 2020, he posted 18 points and seven rebounds in a 78–70 loss to Michigan State. As a senior, Kriener averaged 7.7 points and 4.1 rebounds per game, shooting 54 percent from the floor.

== Professional career ==
On August 8, 2020, Kriener signed his first professional contract with the Helios Suns of the Slovenian League and the ABA League Second Division. However he did not play for the team. In January 2021, Kriener signed with the Leuven Bears of the Pro Basketball League. He averaged 19 points and 7 rebounds per game and was one of the finalists for league MVP. On July 13, Kriener signed with the Ehime Orange Vikings of the Japanese B.League.

On June 23, 2023 Kriener signed with Shiga Lakes.

== Personal life ==
Kriener is the son of Rich and Nancy Kriener, and the nephew of Steve Monsrud. He spent many hours at local parks being coached by his “Uncle Steve”. His father played basketball at Mankato State and was an all-conference performer. Kriener has Leo and Rose written on his sneakers, in honor of his grandparents.
