= Deerfield, Iowa =

- unincorporated community
- Location within Iowa
- Coordinates: 43°09′49″N 92°29′44″W
- Country: USA
- State: Iowa
- County: Chickasaw County
- Elevation: 347 m (1,139 ft)
- Time zone: UTC-6 (Central (CST))
  - Summer (DST): UTC-5 (CDT)
- GNIS feature ID: 464515

Deerfield is an unincorporated community in Chickasaw County, Iowa, United States.

== Geography ==
It is located near the intersections of County Highways B28 and T76 on the east side of the Wapsipinicon River. It is five miles east of Colwell and four miles northwest of North Washington.

== History ==
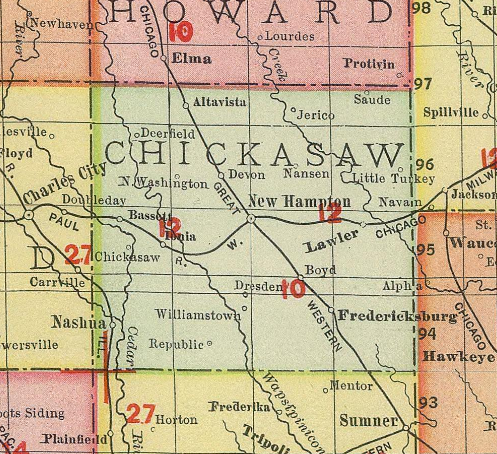
Deerfield in Chickasaw County, Iowa, in 1903

Deerfield was named after Deerfield, Massachusetts; the area was first settled by whites in 1854. Deerfield's population was estimated as 150 in 1875, and was 29 in 1902.

== See also ==
- Boyd, Iowa
