= Iowa Highway 346 =

State highway in Iowa, United States

Iowa Highway 346
- Iowa 346 highlighted in red

Route information
- Maintained by Iowa DOT
- Length: 12.470 mi (20.069 km)

Major junctions
- West end: US 218 / Iowa 27 / CR B60 at Nashua
- East end: US 18 / US 63 near New Hampton

Location
- Country: United States
- State: Iowa
- Counties: Chickasaw

Highway system
- Iowa Primary Highway System; Interstate; US; State; Secondary; Scenic
← Iowa 333	→ Iowa 370

Iowa Highway 346 (Iowa 346) is a short state highway in north-northeastern Iowa. Iowa 346 begins at U.S. Route 218 / Iowa Highway 27 at Nashua, Iowa and ends at the intersection of U.S. Highway 18 and U.S. Highway 63 south of New Hampton.

== Route description ==
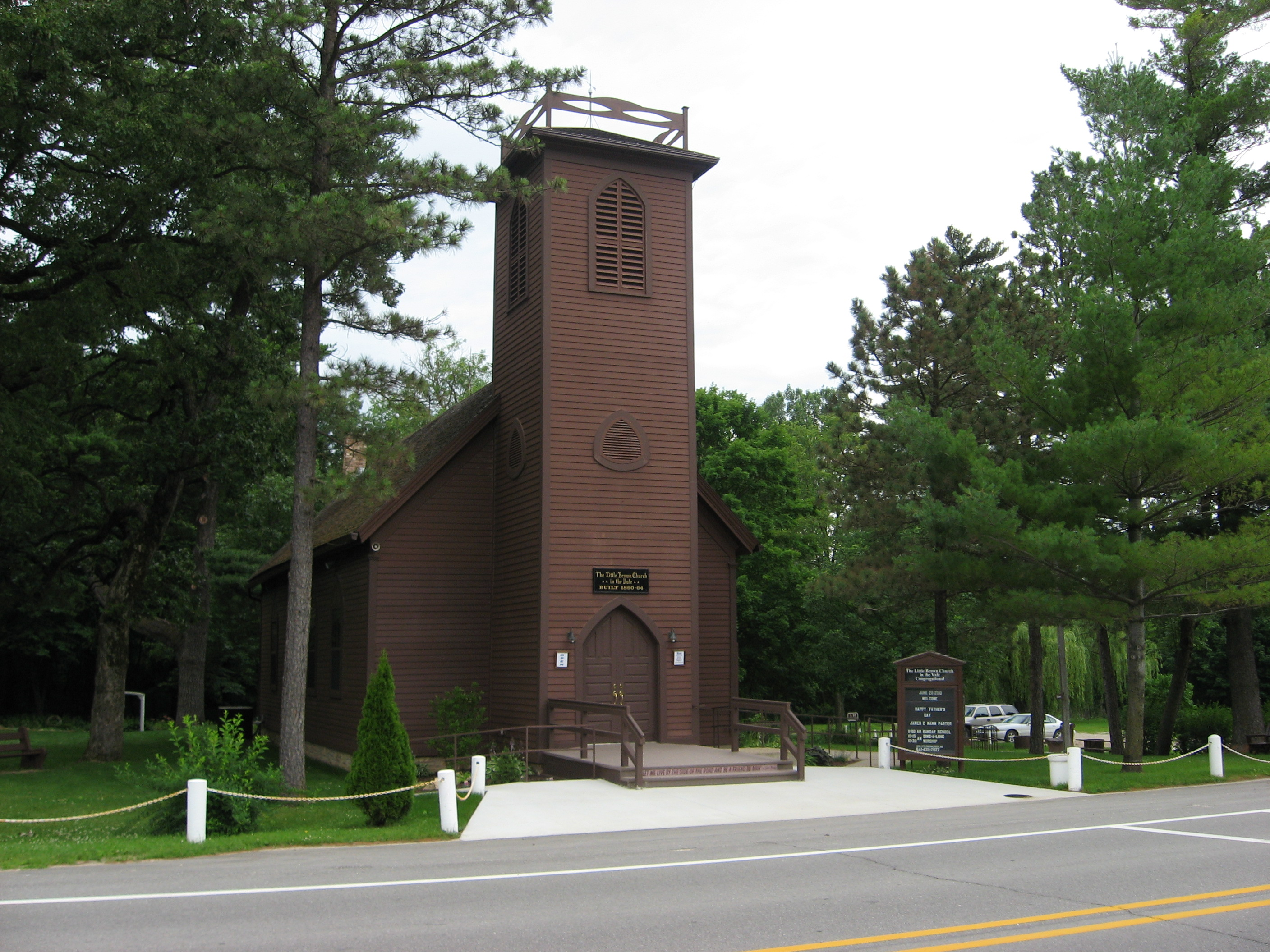
Little Brown Church in the Vale at Nashua is along Iowa 346.

Iowa Highway 346 begins at exit 220 of U.S. Route 218 (US 218) and Iowa Highway 27, the Avenue of the Saints highway, west of Nashua. It heads east and intersects Amherst Boulevard, which is the former alignment of US 218 through Nashua. It crosses the Cedar River adjacent to the dam which holds back Red Cedar Lake and passes the Big Four Fairgrounds before leaving Nashua.

From Nashua, Iowa 346 takes an S-curve to the north and east at Bradford. After exiting the curve, it heads due east for the remainder of its length along section lines. The route travels 9 miles (14 km) through rolling farmland before ending at an interchange with U.S. Highway 18 and U.S. Highway 63 in Richland Township.

== History ==
Iowa Highway 346 was originally a spur route connecting Bradford to U.S. Route 218 in Nashua. By 1954, Iowa 346 had been extended east to the intersection of U.S. Highway 18 and U.S. Highway 63 west of Fredericksburg. After the Avenue of the Saints corridor was constructed and opened in 2003, the western end of Iowa 346 was moved 1/3 mile (0.54 km) to the west.

== Major intersections ==
The entire route is in Chickasaw County.

Location	mi	km	Destinations	Notes
Nashua	0.000	0.000	US 218 / Iowa 27 / CR B60	
Nashua	0.365	0.587	Amherst Boulevard	Former alignment of US 218
Richland Township	12.470	20.069	US 18 / US 63	
1.000 mi = 1.609 km; 1.000 km = 0.621 mi
