= New Hampton Community School District =

Public school district in New Hampton, Iowa, United States

Coordinates: 43.058781°N 92.328900°W

Location
- New Hampton, Iowa Chickasaw County and Howard County United States
- Coordinates: 43.058781, -92.328900

District information
- Type: Local school district
- Grades: K-12
- Superintendent: Erik Smith
- Schools: 3
- Budget: $15,273,000 (2020-21)
- NCES District ID: 1920340

Students and staff
- Students: 1038 (2022-23)
- Teachers: 76.79 FTE
- Staff: 83.28 FTE
- Student–teacher ratio: 13.52
- Athletic conference: Northeast Iowa
- District mascot: Chickasaws
- Colors: Red and Black

Other information
- Website: www.new-hampton.k12.ia.us

New Hampton Community School District (NH) is a school district headquartered in New Hampton, Iowa. It operates an elementary school, a middle school, and a high school.

It is mostly in Chickasaw County with a section in Howard County. In addition to New Hampton, the municipalities of Alta Vista, Ionia, and North Washington are in the district limits.

As of 2020, the district had about 1,420 students.

== Schools ==
The district operates three schools, all in New Hampton:

- New Hampton Elementary School
- New Hampton Middle School
- New Hampton High School

By 2019, the district built a $19.4 million new middle school facility with an agricultural-industrial area and a gymnasium with a capacity of 400 more than the previous one.

== See also ==
- List of school districts in Iowa
