= George Darrow Round Barn =

- Formerly listed on the U.S. National Register of Historic Places
- Location within Iowa Location within the United States
- Location: County Road T76
- Nearest city: Alta Vista, Iowa
- Coordinates: 43°9′52″N 92°29′46″W
- Area: less than one acre
- Built: 1916
- Built by: Unknown
- MPS: Iowa Round Barns: The Sixty Year Experiment TR
- NRHP reference No.: 86001421

Significant dates
- Added to NRHP: June 30, 1986
- Removed from NRHP: September 8, 2022

The George Darrow Round Barn is a historic building located near Alta Vista in rural Chickasaw County, Iowa, United States. The true round barn was constructed of clay tile in 1916. The use of clay tiles suggests that it was influenced by the work of the Iowa Agricultural Experiment Station in the early 20th century. It has a diameter 64 feet (20 m), and a height of 50 feet (15 m). The barn features a two-pitch roof and a 14-foot (4.3 m) central clay tile silo. It was built as a dairy barn and it was used as such until 1978. Dairy cow stanchions surround the central silo on one side of the barn in a circular arrangement, and horse stalls surround the other side. The barn has been listed on the National Register of Historic Places (NRHP) since 1986. It has subsequently been torn down. It was removed from the NRHP in 2022.
