= Barloon =

Barloon is a surname. Notable people with the surname include:

- Joseph Barloon (born 1967), American lawyer
- William Barloon (born 1956), American arrested in Iraq
