= Saude, Iowa =

- Unincorporated community
- Location within Iowa
- Coordinates: 43°11′53″N 92°09′41″W
- Country: United States
- State: Iowa
- County: Chickasaw
- Elevation: 1,145 ft (349 m)
- Time zone: UTC-6 (Central (CST))
  - Summer (DST): UTC-5 (CDT)
- Area code: 641
- GNIS feature ID: 467242

Saude is an unincorporated community in northern Chickasaw County, in the U.S. state of Iowa.

== Geography ==
Saude lies at the intersection of 110th Street and Stevens Avenue, in sections 20,21,28, and 29 of Untica Township. It is between Jerico and Protivin. It is north of Saude Park.

== History ==
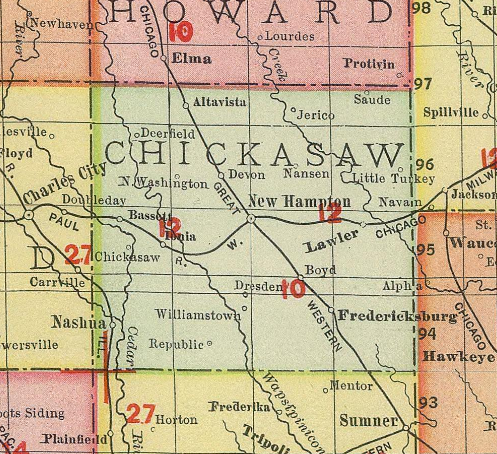
Saude in Chickasaw County, Iowa, in 1903

A post office was established at Saude in 1877, and remained in operation until 1915.

Saude was platted in the northern part of Jacksonville Township, one mile south of the northern boundary of Chickasaw County.

Saude Lutheran Church was founded in 1857 by Norwegian settlers in Saude, under Reverend U.V. Koren. The Saude church still holds services.

Saude's population was 21 residents in 1902.

In 1916, the rural schools around Saude consolidated, and the Consolidated School District of Saude was formed. The consolidated school district covered approximately 23 square miles at that time.

In 1919, historian Robert Herd Fairbairn wrote of Saude, "Saude is the only town worthy of the name in the township. It is located on the river from which it derives its name, which is one of the east tributaries of the Little Turkey River. Saude boasts of a store, a blacksmith shop, two churches and a creamery. The population is not large, but the town is surrounded by a thrifty, industrious and intelligent community who are loyal to their town and have an abiding faith in its prospects and permanency." Saude had 18 residents in 1925.

In 1940, Saude's population was 18.

== Notable residents ==
- Norman Borlaug, agronomist, Nobel Peace Prize laureate, born in Saude in 1914

== See also ==
Little Turkey, Iowa
