= North Washington =

North Washington may refer to a place in the United States:

- North Washington, Colorado
- North Washington, Iowa
- North Washington, Maine
