= Republic, Iowa =

- Unincorporated community
- Location within Iowa
- Coordinates: 42°57′04″N 92°23′51″W
- Country: United States
- State: Iowa
- County: Chickasaw
- Elevation: 1,102 ft (336 m)
- Time zone: UTC-6 (Central (CST))
  - Summer (DST): UTC-5 (CDT)
- Area code: 641
- GNIS feature ID: 460589

Republic is an unincorporated community in southern Chickasaw County, in the U.S. state of Iowa.

== History ==
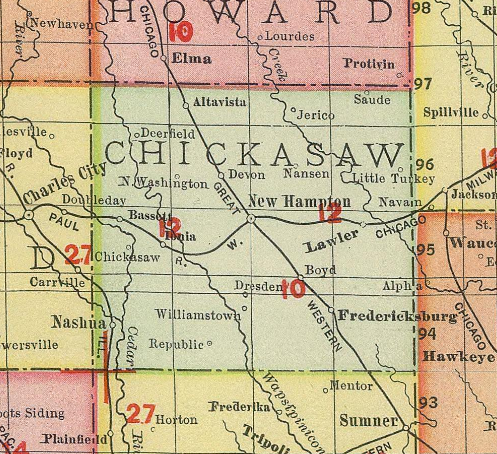
Republic in Chickasaw County, Iowa, in 1903

A post office was established at Republic on February 1, 1887.

Republic was platted in section 20 of Richland Township, one mile east of the center of the township, and about five miles southeast of Williamstown.

Republic's population was 25 in 1887, and was 27 in 1902.

The Republic post office was discontinued on January 31, 1914. In 1915, the population of Republic was 37.

Republic had been a prosperous community, but by 1919, historians were calling the community, and nearby Williamstown, a memory, stating that the heyday of these two communities was long past.

In January 1945, the Republic School was destroyed in a fire. The school was replaced with a new building, said to be "the best rural school building ever built in Chickasaw County," in November 1946.

As late as the 1930s, Republic had two churches. In 1947, the old Methodist church was moved from the north side of the highway to the south side, combining this structure with the Disciples Building. The Republic Community Church still operates.
