= New Hampton Township, Chickasaw County, Iowa =

New Hampton Township
- Township
- Location in Chickasaw County
- Coordinates: 43°02′23″N 092°15′26″W
- Country: United States
- State: Iowa
- County: Chickasaw

Area
  - Total: 36.78 sq mi (95.26 km^{2})
  - Land: 36.78 sq mi (95.26 km^{2})
  - Water: 0 sq mi (0 km^{2}) 0%
- Elevation: 1,132 ft (345 m)

Population (2000)
  - Total: 3,065
  - Density: 83/sq mi (32.2/km^{2})
- GNIS feature ID: 0468432

New Hampton Township is one of twelve townships in Chickasaw County, Iowa, United States. As of the 2000 census, its population was 3,065.

== History ==
New Hampton Township was organized in 1857.

== Geography ==
New Hampton Township covers an area of 36.78 square miles (95.3 km^{2}) and contains one incorporated settlement, New Hampton (the county seat), and the hamlet of Boyd. According to the USGS, it contains three cemeteries: Boyd, Saint Josephs and Union.

The stream of Plum Creek runs through this township.
