= Dayton Township, Chickasaw County, Iowa =

Dayton Township
- Township
- Location in Chickasaw County
- Coordinates: 43°02′17″N 092°22′33″W
- Country: United States
- State: Iowa
- County: Chickasaw

Area
  - Total: 36.66 sq mi (94.95 km^{2})
  - Land: 36.61 sq mi (94.83 km^{2})
  - Water: 0.046 sq mi (0.12 km^{2}) 0.13%
- Elevation: 1,070 ft (326 m)

Population (2000)
  - Total: 1,752
  - Density: 48/sq mi (18.5/km^{2})
- GNIS feature ID: 0467685

Dayton Township is one of twelve townships in Chickasaw County, Iowa, United States. As of the 2000 census, its population was 1,752.

== History ==
Dayton Township was organized in 1859. It is named for William L. Dayton.

== Geography ==
Dayton Township covers an area of 36.66 square miles (94.9 km^{2}) and contains no incorporated settlements. According to the USGS, it contains three cemeteries: Children of Israel, New Hampton and Saint Marys.

The stream of Spring Branch runs through this township.
