= Fredericksburg Township, Chickasaw County, Iowa =

Fredericksburg Township
- Township
- Location in Chickasaw County
- Coordinates: 42°57′06″N 092°08′20″W
- Country: United States
- State: Iowa
- County: Chickasaw

Area
  - Total: 35.92 sq mi (93.02 km^{2})
  - Land: 35.91 sq mi (93.01 km^{2})
  - Water: 0.0039 sq mi (0.01 km^{2}) 0.01%
- Elevation: 1,152 ft (351 m)

Population (2000)
  - Total: 982
  - Density: 27/sq mi (10.6/km^{2})
- GNIS feature ID: 0467866

Fredericksburg Township is one of twelve townships in Chickasaw County, Iowa, USA. As of the 2000 census, its population was 982.

== History ==
Fredericksburg Township was organized in 1857. It is named for Frederick Padden, an early settler.

== Geography ==
Fredericksburg Township covers an area of 35.92 square miles (93.0 km^{2}) and contains the eastern portion of one incorporated settlement, Fredericksburg. According to the USGS, it contains two cemeteries: Maple Grove and Rose Hill.

== Transportation ==
Fredericksburg Township contains one airport or landing strip, Klotz Landing Field.
