= Ryszard Krystosik =

Poland Ambassador to Iraq
- In office 2004–2007
- Preceded by: Andrzej Biera
- Succeeded by: Edward Pietrzyk

Personal details
- Born: 1935 Warsaw
- Died: 24 June 2014 (aged 78–79)
- Resting place: Powązki Military Cemetery
- Education: Central School of Foreign Service
- Profession: Diplomat

Ryszard Krystosik (1935 – 24 June 2014) was a Polish ambassador to Iraq in the years of 2004–2007.

Krystosik graduated from the Central School of Foreign Service and also studied at Princeton University. He began his career at the Ministry of Foreign Affairs in 1956 and served in Vietnam, Laos, Washington, D.C., and New York. He was the leader of the United States Interest Section at the Polish embassy in Baghdad, Iraq and in 1995 was involved in the effort to release Americans David Daliberti and Bill Barloon from Abu Ghraib prison.

In 2010, he was honoured with the Officer's Cross of the Order of Polonia Restituta.
