= Little Turkey, Iowa =

- Unincorporated community
- Location within Iowa
- Coordinates: 43°07′47″N 92°06′04″W
- Country: United States
- State: Iowa
- County: Chickasaw
- Elevation: 1,102 ft (336 m)
- Time zone: UTC-6 (Central (CST))
  - Summer (DST): UTC-5 (CDT)
- Area code: 641
- GNIS feature ID: 464624

Little Turkey is an unincorporated community in eastern Chickasaw County, in the U.S. state of Iowa.

== Geography ==
Little Turkey is near the Little Turkey River, at 43°07′47″N 92°06′04″W, near the junctions of County Road B33 and Windsor Avenue.

== History ==
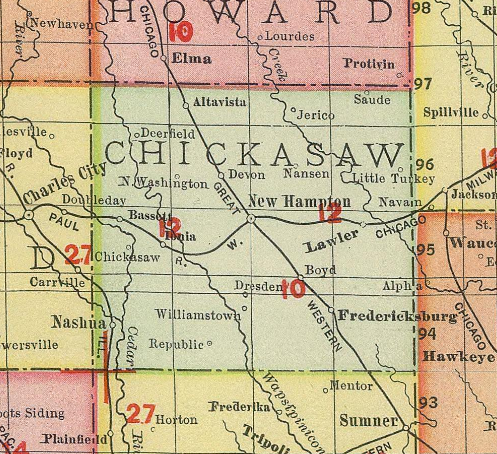
Little Turkey in Chickasaw County, Iowa, in 1903

A post office was established at Little Turkey in 1866; this post office closed in 1871, reopened in 1890, and closed again in 1904.

Little Turkey became what historian Robert Herd Fairbairn called "quite a prosperous and promising little village" with a dance hall, school, church, blacksmith shop, creamery, and general store.

Little Turkey's church was originally a Methodist place of worship, but in 1903 it became Assumption of the Blessed Mary Parish Church (St. Mary's) of Little Turkey. This church has an oratory status today.

By about 1919, Little Turkey's business was in decline, with Robert Fairbairn writing, "Little Turkey has taken its flight," remarking on the loss of businesses. Of Little Turkey, Fairbairn stated that only the creamery remained.

Little Turkey's population was 21 in 1902, and was 25 in 1925.

Students of Little Turkey attended Utica Township School #7 until 1930.

Little Turkey's population was 25 in 1940.

== See also ==
- Saude, Iowa
