= Bradford Township, Chickasaw County, Iowa =

Bradford Township
- Township
- Location in Chickasaw County
- Coordinates: 42°57′19″N 092°29′48″W
- Country: United States
- State: Iowa
- County: Chickasaw

Area
  - Total: 36.02 sq mi (93.29 km^{2})
  - Land: 35.40 sq mi (91.68 km^{2})
  - Water: 0.62 sq mi (1.61 km^{2}) 1.73%
- Elevation: 1,010 ft (308 m)

Population (2000)
  - Total: 2,140
  - Density: 60/sq mi (23.3/km^{2})
- GNIS feature ID: 0467482

Bradford Township is one of twelve townships in Chickasaw County, Iowa, United States. As of the 2000 census, its population was 2,140.

== History ==
Bradford Township is named for Chief Bradford of the Chickasaw people.

== Geography ==
Bradford Township covers an area of 36.02 square miles (93.3 km^{2}) and contains one incorporated settlement, Nashua. According to the USGS, it contains five cemeteries: Cagley, Greenwood, Oak Hill, Pearl Rock Catholic and Saint Michaels.

The streams of Little Cedar River and Twomile Creek run through this township.

== Transportation ==
Bradford Township contains two airports or landing strips: Clevelands Landing Strip and Harrison Landing Strip.
