= Mike Humpal =

American football player (born 1985)

No. 55
- Position: Linebacker

Personal information
- Born: February 17, 1985 (age 41); New Hampton, Iowa, U.S.
- Listed height: 6 ft 3 in (1.91 m)
- Listed weight: 244 lb (111 kg)

Career information
- High school: New Hampton
- College: Iowa
- NFL draft: 2008: 6th round, 188th overall pick

Career history
- Pittsburgh Steelers (2008)

Awards and highlights
- Super Bowl champion (XLIII); Second-team All-Big Ten (2007)
- Stats at Pro Football Reference

Michael Humpal (born February 17, 1985) is an American former professional football player who was a linebacker for the Pittsburgh Steelers of the National Football League (NFL). He played college football for the Iowa Hawkeyes and was selected by the Steelers in the sixth round of the 2008 NFL draft. He was part of the Steelers' Super Bowl XLIII winning team.

== Early life ==
Humpal was born in New Hampton, Iowa to Reggie and Nancy Humpal. He attended New Hampton High School, where he was an Elite-Team All-State player in football, 2-time state wrestling champion and 2-time state runner-up 110 meter high hurdler and 5th place state discus thrower in track and field.

== College career ==
At the University of Iowa, Humpal recorded 49 tackles in 2006 as a junior, and had a breakout senior season (2007) recording 123 tackles, 5.5 tackles for a loss, and 3 interceptions.

== Professional career ==
Humpal was injured when the Steelers cut him, and no teams signed him, he was once again picked up by the Steelers and placed on Injured reserve.

On February 26, 2009, Humpal was released by the Steelers.

== Post-football career ==
As a second career after football, he graduated from Palmer College of Chiropractic and currently practices as Michael J Humpal, DC in North Liberty, IA at Humpal Chiropractic.
