= Dresden Township, Chickasaw County, Iowa =

Dresden Township
- Township
- Location in Chickasaw County
- Coordinates: 42°57′04″N 092°15′30″W
- Country: United States
- State: Iowa
- County: Chickasaw

Area
  - Total: 35.98 sq mi (93.19 km^{2})
  - Land: 35.94 sq mi (93.08 km^{2})
  - Water: 0.042 sq mi (0.11 km^{2}) 0.12%
- Elevation: 1,047 ft (319 m)

Population (2000)
  - Total: 822
  - Density: 23/sq mi (8.8/km^{2})
- GNIS feature ID: 0467743

Dresden Township is one of twelve townships in Chickasaw County, Iowa, USA. As of the 2000 census, its population was 822.

== History ==
Dresden Township was organized in 1859.

== Geography ==
Dresden Township covers an area of 35.98 square miles (93.2 km^{2}) and contains no incorporated settlements. The western portion of the city of Fredericksburg impacts eastern Dresden Township. The unincorporated hamlet of Williamstown is at the intersection of 270th Street and Mission Avenue. According to the USGS, it contains three cemeteries: North East Iowa Garden of Memories, Saint Johns and West.

Marsh Creek and other streams meander through Dresden Township, connecting to the East Fork Wapsipinicon River as it flows through the township.

== Transportation ==
Dresden Township contains one airport or landing strip, McFarland Hereford Farm Landing Strip. Highway US-18 traverses the township as 270th Street.
