= New Hampton High School =

Public secondary school in New Hampton, Iowa, United States

Location
- 710 W Main; New Hampton, IA 50659; United States; 43.058726°N 92.328985°W

Information
- Type: Public secondary
- School district: New Hampton Community School District
- Principal: Matt Manson
- Teaching staff: 29.25 (FTE)
- Grades: 9-12
- Enrollment: 332 (2023-2024)
- Student to teacher ratio: 11.35
- Campus type: Rural
- Colors: Red and black
- Athletics conference: Northeast Iowa
- Mascot: Chickasaw
- Website: www.new-hampton.k12.ia.us/page/high-school

New Hampton High School is a public secondary school located in New Hampton, Iowa, United States. The school is part of the New Hampton Community School District and educates approximately 340 students from grades 9 to 12. The school's mascot is the Chickasaw.

== Athletics ==
New Hampton is a founding member of the Northeast Iowa Conference, and the Chickasaws participate in the following sports:

- Cross country
  - Girls' 2-time State Champions (1981, 1982)
- Volleyball
- Football
  - 1999 Class 3A State Champions
- Basketball
  - Boys' 1993 Class 3A State Champions
- Swimming
- Wrestling
  - 6-time State Champions (1933, 1957, 1959, 1963, 1990, 1993)
  - 5-time Class 2A State Duals Champions (1990, 1993, 2005, 2017, 2018(as New Hampton-Turkey Valley))
- Track and field
  - Girls' 1996 Class 2A State Champions
- Golf
- Baseball
- Softball

== Notable alumni ==
- Eve Drewelowe, painter
- Mike Humpal, National Football League player
- Duane Josephson, Major League Baseball player
- Coleen Rowley, United States Attorney
- Sarah Utterback, actress

== See also ==
- List of high schools in Iowa
