= Bertha M. Rice =

American writer (1872–1962)

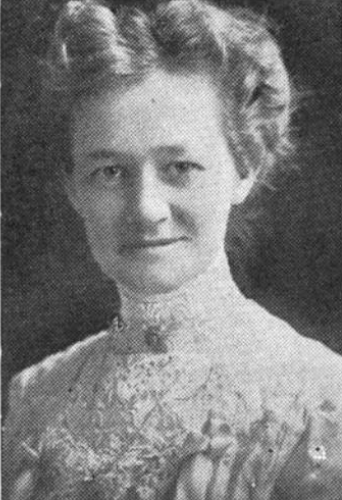
- Bertha M. Rice, from a 1921 publication
- Born: Bertha May Davison; February 20, 1872; New Hampton, Iowa
- Died: June 27, 1962 (aged 90); Santa Clara, California
- Occupation(s): Writer, clubwoman, conservationist, philanthropist

Bertha Marguerite Rice (February 20, 1872 – June 27, 1962) was an American writer, philanthropist, conservationist, and clubwoman based in Santa Clara County, California.

== Early life ==
Bertha May Davison was born in New Hampton, Iowa, the daughter of Lorenzo Benjamin Davison and Esther Jane Anibal Davison. Her brother, Charles W. Davison, was mayor of San Jose from 1908 to 1910.

== Career ==
Rice, an active clubwoman in San Jose, volunteered to work with children in refugee camps after the 1906 earthquake. As an extension of that work, she became founder and director of the 80-acre Boys' Outing Farm in the Santa Cruz Mountains, initially to serve earthquake refugees and later as a fresh-air experience for disadvantaged boys from San Francisco. The camp also offered a convalescent program for "the little ones who are not strong enough to avail themselves of the privileges of the farm." The camp was open from 1907 to 1938, though there was an unsuccessful petition for her resignation as the camp's director in 1912, citing her "incompetency and inefficiency".

Rice founder and president of the California Wild Flower Conservation League, and co-director of the annual State Exhibit of California Wildflowers. "Mrs. Bertha Rice and her son Roland Rice are to the flowers of California what John Muir was to the trees," commented one writer in a 1920 book review.

Rice was involved in women's suffrage work in California. She co-founded the Santa Clara County Historical Society and the local chapter of the Audubon Society. She was an officer in the local chapter of the Woman's Christian Temperance Union. She was a member of the San Jose Consumers' League and of the California Library Association. She was active in the work of the People's Place settlement house in San Francisco's North Beach. In 1912 she arranged a concert by Ernestine Schumann-Heink for the children of San Jose. During World War II, she organized the San Jose Garden Forum to encourage home gardening.

Rice wrote several books, including Tales of the Pioneer Mothers of California (1904), Popular Studies of California Wild Flowers (1920, with Roland Rice and illustrator Myrtle Hill McQuarrie), The Women of Our Valley (2 volumes, 1955, 1956), The Builders of Our Valley (1957), and the introduction to a photography book about Stanford University. She also wrote a column on flowers for the Oakland Tribune, was society editor for the San Jose Mercury, and contributed articles for national periodicals including the Sierra Club Bulletin, The Volta Review and Overland Monthly.

== Personal life ==
Bertha M. Davison married Warren M. Rice in Iowa in 1892, and had a son, Roland Davison Rice (1895–1962) before they divorced in 1898. She lived with Roland in San Jose for many years, and died in 1962, aged 90 years.
