= Chickasaw County Courthouse (Iowa) =

- U.S. National Register of Historic Places
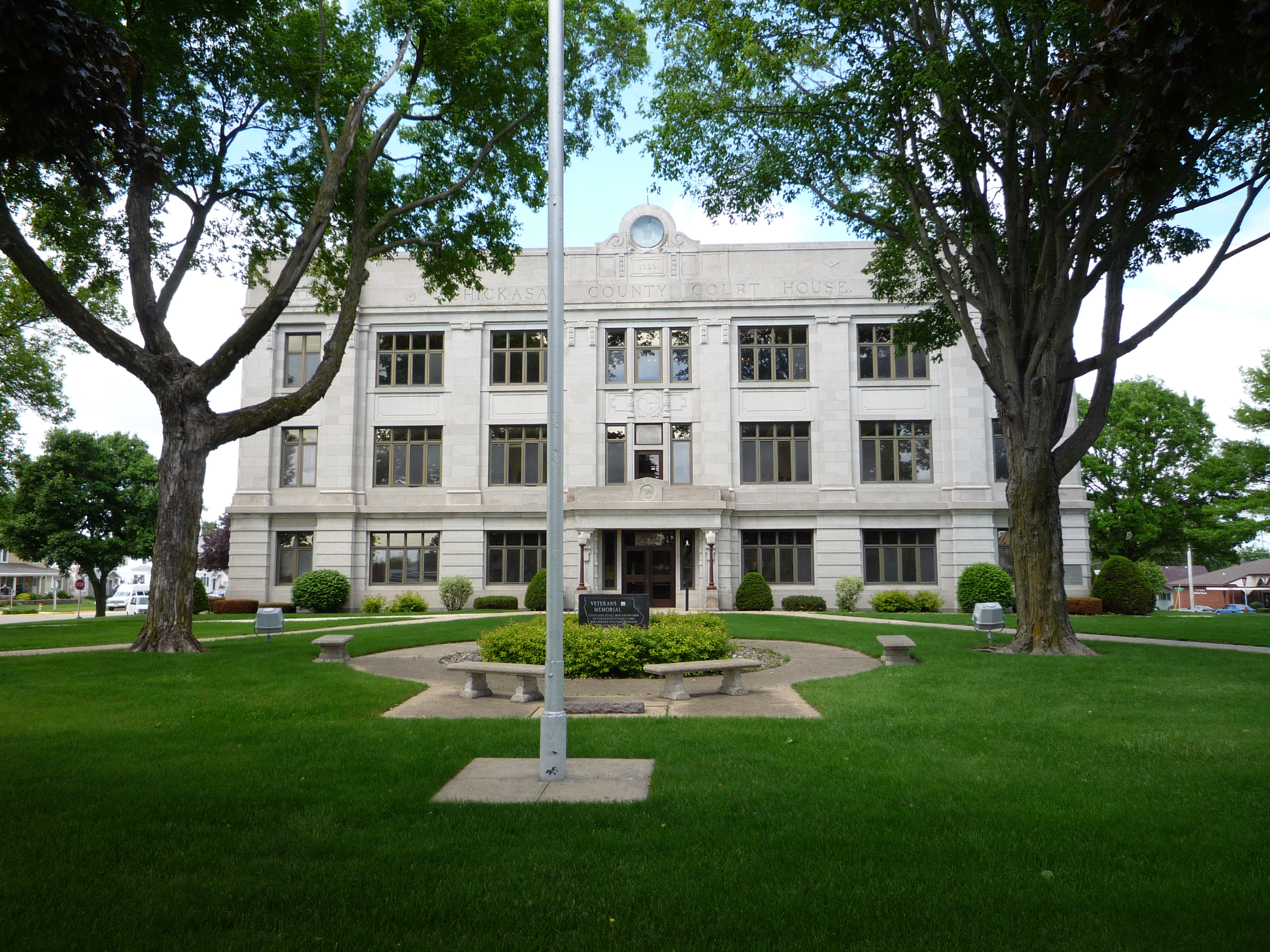
- Chickasaw County Courthouse in 2009

- Location within Iowa Location within the United States
- Interactive map showing the location for Chickasaw County Courthouse
- Location: Prospect St. at Locust Ave., New Hampton, Iowa
- Coordinates: 43°9′36″N 92°18′49″W
- Area: less than one acre
- Built: 1929-1930
- Architect: Ralston & Ralston
- Architectural style: Streamline Moderne; Art Deco; Stripped Classicism
- MPS: County Courthouses in Iowa TR
- NRHP reference No.: 81000228
- Added to NRHP: July 02, 1981

The Chickasaw County Courthouse is a historic governmental building located at 8 East Prospect Street in New Hampton, Iowa, United States. On July 2, 1981, it was added to the National Register of Historic Places. The courthouse is the fourth structure to house court functions and county administration.

== History ==
Bradford was established as the first county seat for Chickasaw County in 1854, and a log structure was built for a courthouse. One of the first functions in the new building was to move the county seat to the more centrally located town of New Hampton, which was finalized in 1857. The following year people in the southern part of the county objected and suggested a place such as Forest City, different from the Forest City in Winnebago County, was a better location. An election was held and once again the decision was made to move the county seat. However, it was discovered that the poll book had been tampered with and the decision was fought in the courts with New Hampton being the eventual winner. The first courthouse there, a frame structure, was not completed until 1865. A four-room brick addition was built in 1876. The courthouse was destroyed in a fire on March 26, 1880, but the records were saved. The people in New Hampton contributed $5,000 for a new courthouse so as to keep the county seat in the city. The brick and stone structure was completed in 1881 for $10,500. It featured a clock tower that rose above the main facade. Two wings were added to the building in 1905 and 1906 for about $4,200 each.

The present courthouse was built from 1929 to 1930. It was designed by the Waterloo, Iowa architectural firm of Ralston & Ralston. Its style is Stripped Classicism that is strongly influenced by the Moderne and the Art Deco styles. It was constructed of Bedford stone for about $134,000. Its significance is derived from its association with county government, and the political power and prestige of New Hampton as the county seat.
