= Boyd, Iowa =

- Unincorporated community
- Location within Iowa
- Coordinates: 43°00′45″N 92°15′29″W
- Country: United States
- State: Iowa
- County: Chickasaw
- Elevation: 1,135 ft (346 m)
- Time zone: UTC-6 (Central (CST))
  - Summer (DST): UTC-5 (CDT)
- Area code: 641
- GNIS feature ID: 454782

Boyd is an unincorporated community in southeastern New Hampton Township in Chickasaw County, in the U.S. state of Iowa.

== Geography ==
Boyd is near the junction of 240th and Odessa Streets, in section 28 of Hampton Township.

== History ==
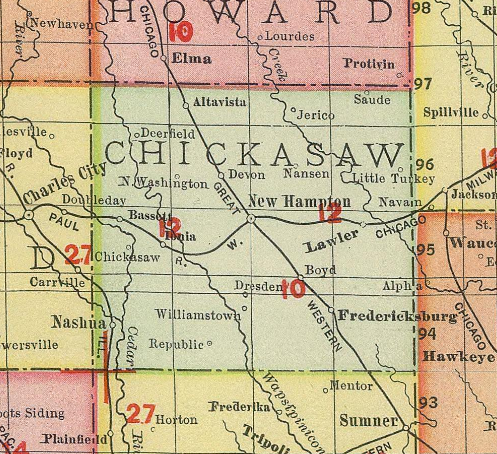
Boyd in Chickasaw County, Iowa, in 1903

A post office was established at Boyd in 1890, and remained in operation until 1908. Boyd had a depot on the Chicago Great Western Railroad.

Boyd's population was 54 in 1902, and 55 in 1925. The population was 45 in 1940.

== See also ==
- Saude, Iowa
