= Ionia, Iowa =

- City
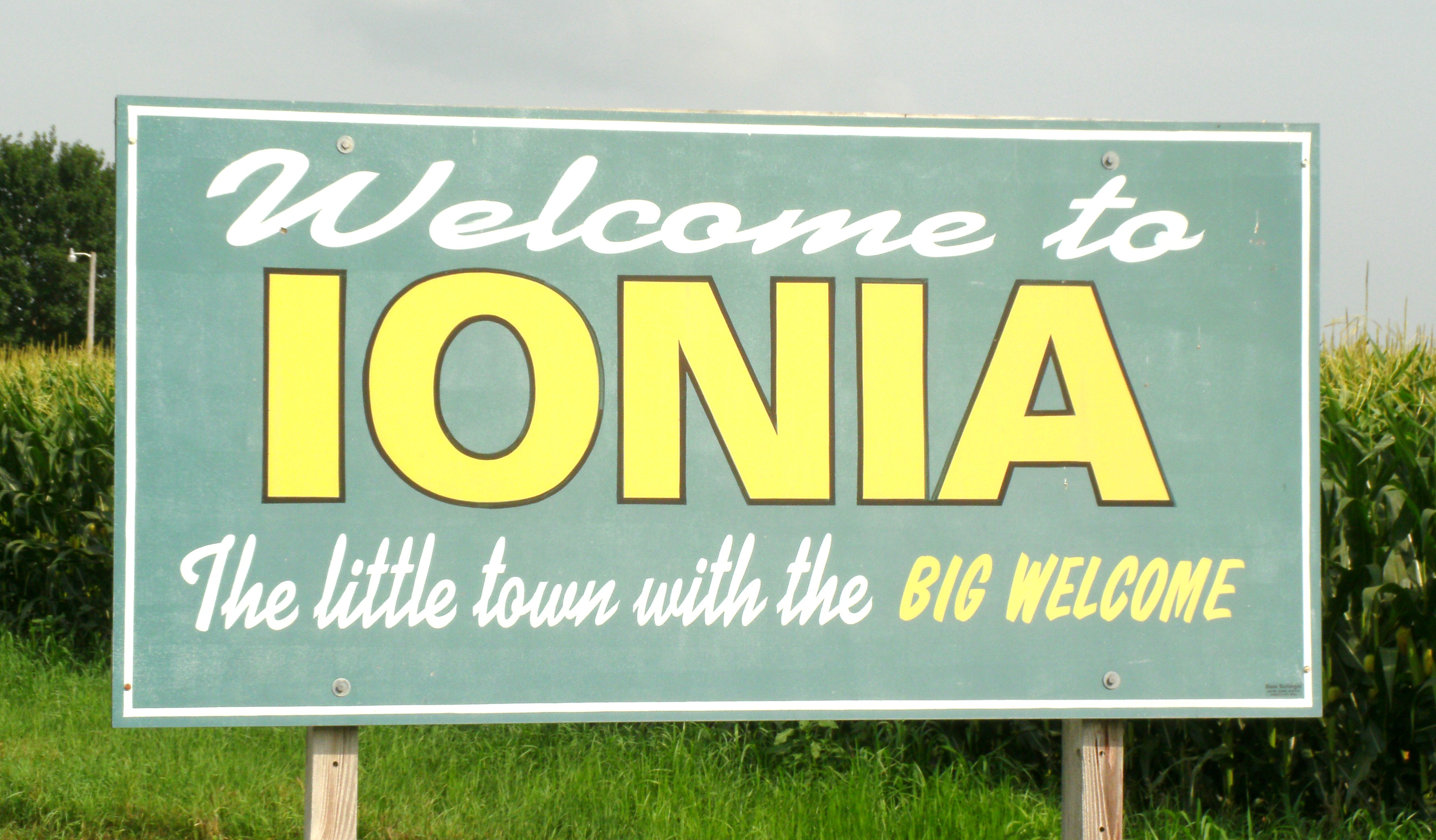
- Ionia welcome sign

- Location of Ionia, Iowa
- Coordinates: 43°02′09″N 92°27′30″W
- Country: USA
- State: Iowa
- County: Chickasaw
- Incorporated: April 23, 1891

Area
  - Total: 0.56 sq mi (1.46 km^{2})
  - Land: 0.56 sq mi (1.46 km^{2})
  - Water: 0 sq mi (0.00 km^{2})
- Elevation: 1,148 ft (350 m)

Population (2020)
  - Total: 226
  - Density: 400.7/sq mi (154.73/km^{2})
- Time zone: UTC-6 (Central (CST))
  - Summer (DST): UTC-5 (CDT)
- ZIP code: 50645
- Area code: 641
- FIPS code: 19-38460
- GNIS feature ID: 2395432

Ionia is a city in Chickasaw County, Iowa, United States. The population was 226 at the time of the 2020 census. The Ionia post office opened in 1870.

== Geography ==
According to the United States Census Bureau, the city has a total area of 0.55 square miles (1.42 km^{2}), all land.

== Demographics ==
Historical populations
Year	Pop.	±%
1880	198	—
1900	306	+54.5%
1910	298	−2.6%
1920	280	−6.0%
1930	246	−12.1%
1940	283	+15.0%
1950	301	+6.4%
1960	265	−12.0%
1970	270	+1.9%
1980	350	+29.6%
1990	304	−13.1%
2000	277	−8.9%
2010	291	+5.1%
2020	226	−22.3%
Source:"U.S. Census website". United States Census Bureau. and Iowa Data Center; Source: U.S. Decennial Census

=== 2020 census ===
As of the census of 2020, there were 226 people, 109 households, and 70 families residing in the city. The population density was 400.7 inhabitants per square mile (154.7/km^{2}). There were 126 housing units at an average density of 223.4 per square mile (86.3/km^{2}). The racial makeup of the city was 98.2% White, 0.0% Black or African American, 0.9% Native American, 0.0% Asian, 0.4% Pacific Islander, 0.0% from other races and 0.4% from two or more races. Hispanic or Latino persons of any race comprised 0.4% of the population.

Of the 109 households, 26.6% of which had children under the age of 18 living with them, 40.4% were married couples living together, 7.3% were cohabitating couples, 19.3% had a female householder with no spouse or partner present and 33.0% had a male householder with no spouse or partner present. 35.8% of all households were non-families. 33.0% of all households were made up of individuals, 16.5% had someone living alone who was 65 years old or older.

The median age in the city was 47.5 years. 24.3% of the residents were under the age of 20; 3.1% were between the ages of 20 and 24; 19.9% were from 25 and 44; 35.0% were from 45 and 64; and 17.7% were 65 years of age or older. The gender makeup of the city was 49.1% male and 50.9% female.

=== 2010 census ===
As of the census of 2010, there were 291 people, 119 households, and 74 families living in the city. The population density was 529.1 inhabitants per square mile (204.3/km^{2}). There were 133 housing units at an average density of 241.8 per square mile (93.4/km^{2}). The racial makeup of the city was 99.7% White and 0.3% from other races. Hispanic or Latino of any race were 0.7% of the population.

There were 119 households, of which 32.8% had children under the age of 18 living with them, 49.6% were married couples living together, 5.0% had a female householder with no husband present, 7.6% had a male householder with no wife present, and 37.8% were non-families. 32.8% of all households were made up of individuals, and 17.6% had someone living alone who was 65 years of age or older. The average household size was 2.45 and the average family size was 3.09.

The median age in the city was 36.8 years. 30.2% of residents were under the age of 18; 5.6% were between the ages of 18 and 24; 21.3% were from 25 to 44; 27.5% were from 45 to 64; and 15.5% were 65 years of age or older. The gender makeup of the city was 50.5% male and 49.5% female.

=== 2000 census ===
As of the census of 2000, there were 277 people, 115 households, and 73 families living in the city. The population density was 496.3 inhabitants per square mile (191.6/km^{2}). There were 135 housing units at an average density of 241.9 per square mile (93.4/km^{2}). The racial makeup of the city was 100.00% White. Hispanic or Latino of any race were 0.72% of the population.

There were 115 households, out of which 31.3% had children under the age of 18 living with them, 57.4% were married couples living together, 3.5% had a female householder with no husband present, and 36.5% were non-families. 32.2% of all households were made up of individuals, and 16.5% had someone living alone who was 65 years of age or older. The average household size was 2.41 and the average family size was 3.12.

In the city, the population was spread out, with 25.6% under the age of 18, 7.2% from 18 to 24, 29.2% from 25 to 44, 22.0% from 45 to 64, and 15.9% who were 65 years of age or older. The median age was 39 years. For every 100 females, there were 111.5 males. For every 100 females age 18 and over, there were 104.0 males.

The median income for a household in the city was $35,357, and the median income for a family was $40,625. Males had a median income of $28,750 versus $21,250 for females. The per capita income for the city was $17,355. None of the population or families were below the poverty line.

== Education ==
It is within the New Hampton Community School District.

== Notable residents ==
- Jack Cunningham, screenwriter
- Henry W. Wright, Speaker of the California State Assembly
