= William Barloon =

American detainee

William "Bill" Barloon (born 1956) is an American who was arrested in 1995, during President of Iraq Saddam Hussein's rule, along with his friend David Daliberti and fellow Americans Chad Hall and Kenneth Beaty, accused of illegally entering Iraq.

== Personal ==
Bill Barloon is from New Hampton, Iowa. He married Linda Barloon, a businesswoman. As of 1995, the couple had three children.

== Arrest ==
William Barloon and David Daliberti were working as civilian contractors for the United States Navy as aircraft mechanics in Kuwait when they were arrested on March 13, 1995, after they crossed the Kuwaiti-Iraqi border, allegedly without knowing it. They were held at Abu Ghraib prison. While at Abu Ghraib, they were visited by their wives, who tried unsuccessfully to get their husbands freed.

On March 25, Barloon and Daliberti were sentenced to 8 years in prison. Soon afterwards, such political persons as Polish diplomat Ryszard Krystosik, and future New Mexico Governor Bill Richardson visited them in prison to try to put international pressure into their case and have them released. Krystosik reported them to look good health-wise but in difficult conditions. He also said that Barloon and Daliberti were living in a cell with 200 other prisoners and only 3 holes to be used as toilets.

According to Barloon and Daliberti, both men had heart trouble, and were treated fairly by doctors at a medical facility during their imprisonment.

== Release ==
On Sunday, July 16, 1995, Barloon and Daliberti were released after Bill Richardson had met with Hussein for one hour. They were released on humanitarian grounds, but American officials speculated that Hussein was trying to make the United Nations relent on their international economic sanctions against Iraq.

Both Barloon's and Daliberti's wives were personally told by telephone by United States President Bill Clinton that their husbands had been released. Bill Barloon's wife Linda was on a business trip to Singapore at the time of their release.

Barloon went to Amman, Jordan on July 18, along with Richardson and Daliberti. From Amman, Barloon boarded a Gulf Air flight that took him to Manama, Bahrain, from where he flew to Kuwait City, Kuwait.

== Monetary awards ==
In 2001, a Washington D.C. federal judge determined that Barloon was to be awarded 2.9 million dollars and his wife Linda 1.5, from the Iraqi government, for his incarceration.
