= Alta Vista, Iowa =

- City
- Location of Alta Vista, Iowa
- Coordinates: 43°11′48″N 92°25′01″W
- Country: United States
- State: Iowa
- County: Chickasaw

Area
  - Total: 0.75 sq mi (1.95 km^{2})
  - Land: 0.75 sq mi (1.95 km^{2})
  - Water: 0 sq mi (0.00 km^{2})
- Elevation: 1,155 ft (352 m)

Population (2020)
  - Total: 227
  - Density: 302.0/sq mi (116.61/km^{2})
- Time zone: UTC-6 (Central (CST))
  - Summer (DST): UTC-5 (CDT)
- ZIP code: 50603
- Area code: 641
- FIPS code: 19-01540
- GNIS feature ID: 2393930

Alta Vista is a city in Chickasaw County, Iowa, United States. The population was 227 at the 2020 census.

The town was first named Elk Creek, but was changed to Alta Vista, meaning "high view" in Spanish. The town was established and incorporated in 1894.

The George Darrow Round Barn in Alta Vista was listed on the National Register of Historic Places. It was torn down, and subsequently removed from the Register in 2022.

== Geography ==
According to the United States Census Bureau, the city has a total area of 0.76 square miles (1.97 km^{2}), all land.

== Demographics ==
Historical populations
Year	Pop.	±%
1900	179	—
1910	356	+98.9%
1920	355	−0.3%
1930	293	−17.5%
1940	333	+13.7%
1950	312	−6.3%
1960	276	−11.5%
1970	283	+2.5%
1980	314	+11.0%
1990	246	−21.7%
2000	286	+16.3%
2010	266	−7.0%
2020	227	−14.7%
Source:"U.S. Census website". United States Census Bureau. and Iowa Data Center; Source: U.S. Decennial Census

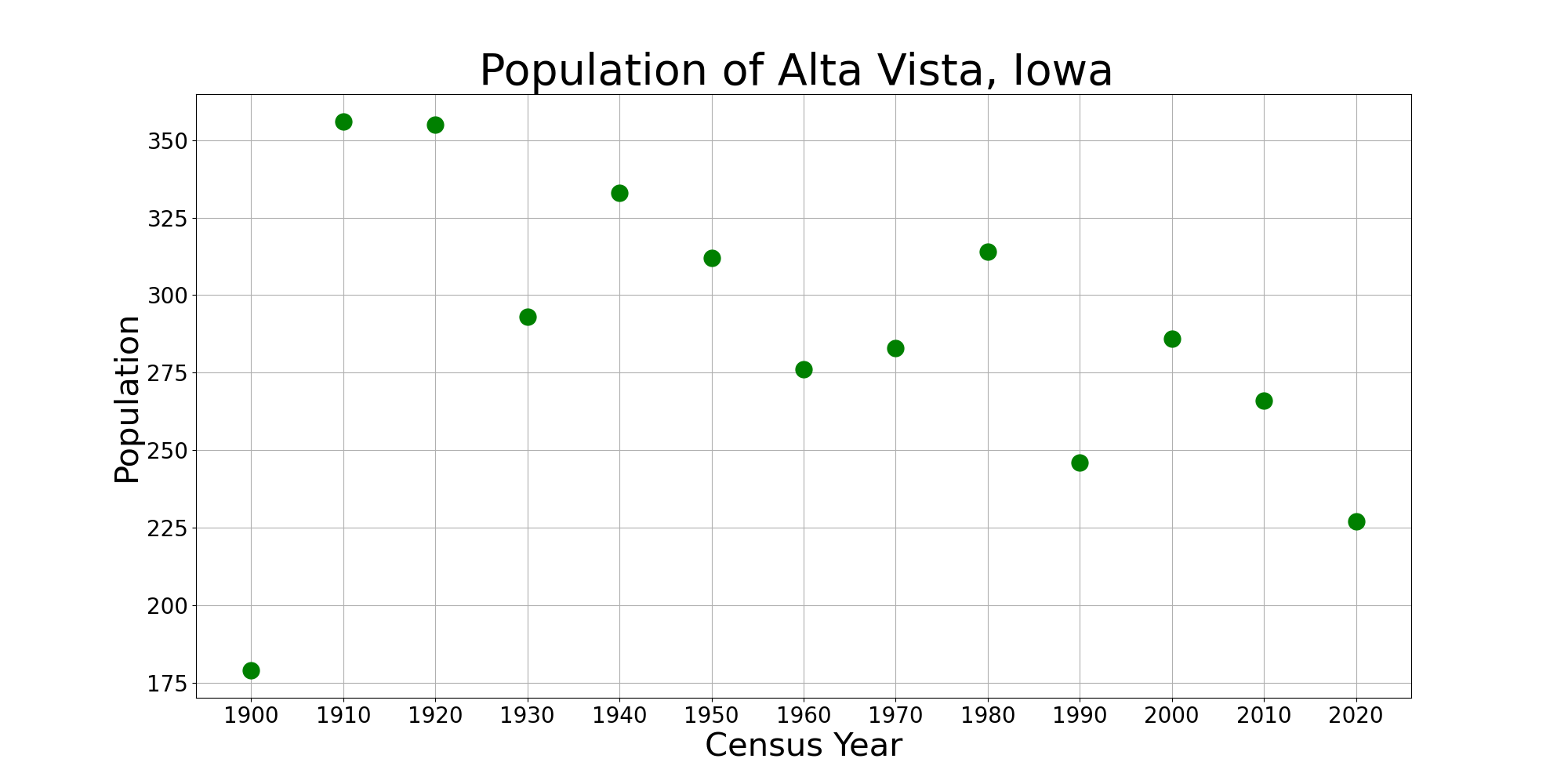
The population of Alta Vista, Iowa from US census data

=== 2020 census ===
As of the census of 2020, there were 227 people, 99 households, and 54 families residing in the city. The population density was 302.0 inhabitants per square mile (116.6/km^{2}). There were 126 housing units at an average density of 167.6 per square mile (64.7/km^{2}). The racial makeup of the city was 91.6% White, 2.2% Black or African American, 0.4% Native American, 0.0% Asian, 0.0% Pacific Islander, 1.8% from other races and 4.0% from two or more races. Hispanic or Latino persons of any race comprised 2.2% of the population.

Of the 99 households, 25.3% of which had children under the age of 18 living with them, 40.4% were married couples living together, 7.1% were cohabitating couples, 26.3% had a female householder with no spouse or partner present and 26.3% had a male householder with no spouse or partner present. 45.5% of all households were non-families. 37.4% of all households were made up of individuals, 10.1% had someone living alone who was 65 years old or older.

The median age in the city was 43.8 years. 22.5% of the residents were under the age of 20; 8.8% were between the ages of 20 and 24; 19.8% were from 25 and 44; 29.1% were from 45 and 64; and 19.8% were 65 years of age or older. The gender makeup of the city was 52.0% male and 48.0% female.

=== 2010 census ===
As of the census of 2010, there were 266 people, 116 households, and 65 families residing in the city. The population density was 350.0 inhabitants per square mile (135.1/km^{2}). There were 132 housing units at an average density of 173.7 per square mile (67.1/km^{2}). The racial makeup of the city was 99.6% White and 0.4% from two or more races. Hispanic or Latino of any race were 1.1% of the population.

There were 116 households, of which 32.8% had children under the age of 18 living with them, 37.9% were married couples living together, 11.2% had a female householder with no husband present, 6.9% had a male householder with no wife present, and 44.0% were non-families. 37.9% of all households were made up of individuals, and 18.1% had someone living alone who was 65 years of age or older. The average household size was 2.29 and the average family size was 3.02.

The median age in the city was 38.8 years. 28.9% of residents were under the age of 18; 4.9% were between the ages of 18 and 24; 27.9% were from 25 to 44; 17.7% were from 45 to 64; and 20.7% were 65 years of age or older. The gender makeup of the city was 48.1% male and 51.9% female.

=== 2000 census ===
As of the census of 2000, there were 286 people, 125 households, and 75 families residing in the city. The population density was 378.5 inhabitants per square mile (146.1/km^{2}). There were 131 housing units at an average density of 173.4 per square mile (67.0/km^{2}). The racial makeup of the city was 100.00% White.

There were 125 households, out of which 27.2% had children under the age of 18 living with them, 48.8% were married couples living together, 7.2% had a female householder with no husband present, and 40.0% were non-families. 35.2% of all households were made up of individuals, and 22.4% had someone living alone who was 65 years of age or older. The average household size was 2.29 and the average family size was 2.93.

Age spread: 24.1% under the age of 18, 10.1% from 18 to 24, 26.6% from 25 to 44, 16.1% from 45 to 64, and 23.1% who were 65 years of age or older. The median age was 34 years. For every 100 females, there were 100.0 males. For every 100 females age 18 and over, there were 108.7 males.

The median income for a household in the city was $26,786, and the median income for a family was $39,464. Males had a median income of $24,167 versus $22,045 for females. The per capita income for the city was $15,378. About 10.4% of families and 13.9% of the population were below the poverty line, including 11.9% of those under the age of eighteen and 9.4% of those 65 or over.

== Education ==
It is within the New Hampton Community School District.
