= Bassett, Iowa =

- City
- Location of Bassett, Iowa

- Location within Iowa Location within the United States Location within North America
- Coordinates: 43°03′42″N 92°30′55″W
- Country: USA
- State: Iowa
- County: Chickasaw
- Incorporated: November 7, 1896

Area
  - Total: 0.39 sq mi (1.02 km^{2})
  - Land: 0.39 sq mi (1.02 km^{2})
  - Water: 0 sq mi (0.00 km^{2})
- Elevation: 1,034 ft (315 m)

Population (2020)
  - Total: 45
  - Density: 114.8/sq mi (44.31/km^{2})
- Time zone: UTC-6 (Central (CST))
  - Summer (DST): UTC-5 (CDT)
- ZIP code: 50645
- Area code: 641
- FIPS code: 19-04780
- GNIS feature ID: 2394074

Bassett is a city in Chickasaw County, Iowa, United States. The population was 45 at the 2020 census. A post office operated in Bassett from 1872 to 1957.

== Geography ==
According to the United States Census Bureau, the city has a total area of 0.37 square miles (0.96 km^{2}), all land.

== Demographics ==
Historical populations
Year	Pop.	±%
1900	149	—
1910	130	−12.8%
1920	135	+3.8%
1930	149	+10.4%
1940	147	−1.3%
1950	125	−15.0%
1960	130	+4.0%
1970	152	+16.9%
1980	128	−15.8%
1990	74	−42.2%
2000	74	+0.0%
2010	66	−10.8%
2020	45	−31.8%
Source:"U.S. Census website". United States Census Bureau. and Iowa Data Center; Source: U.S. Decennial Census

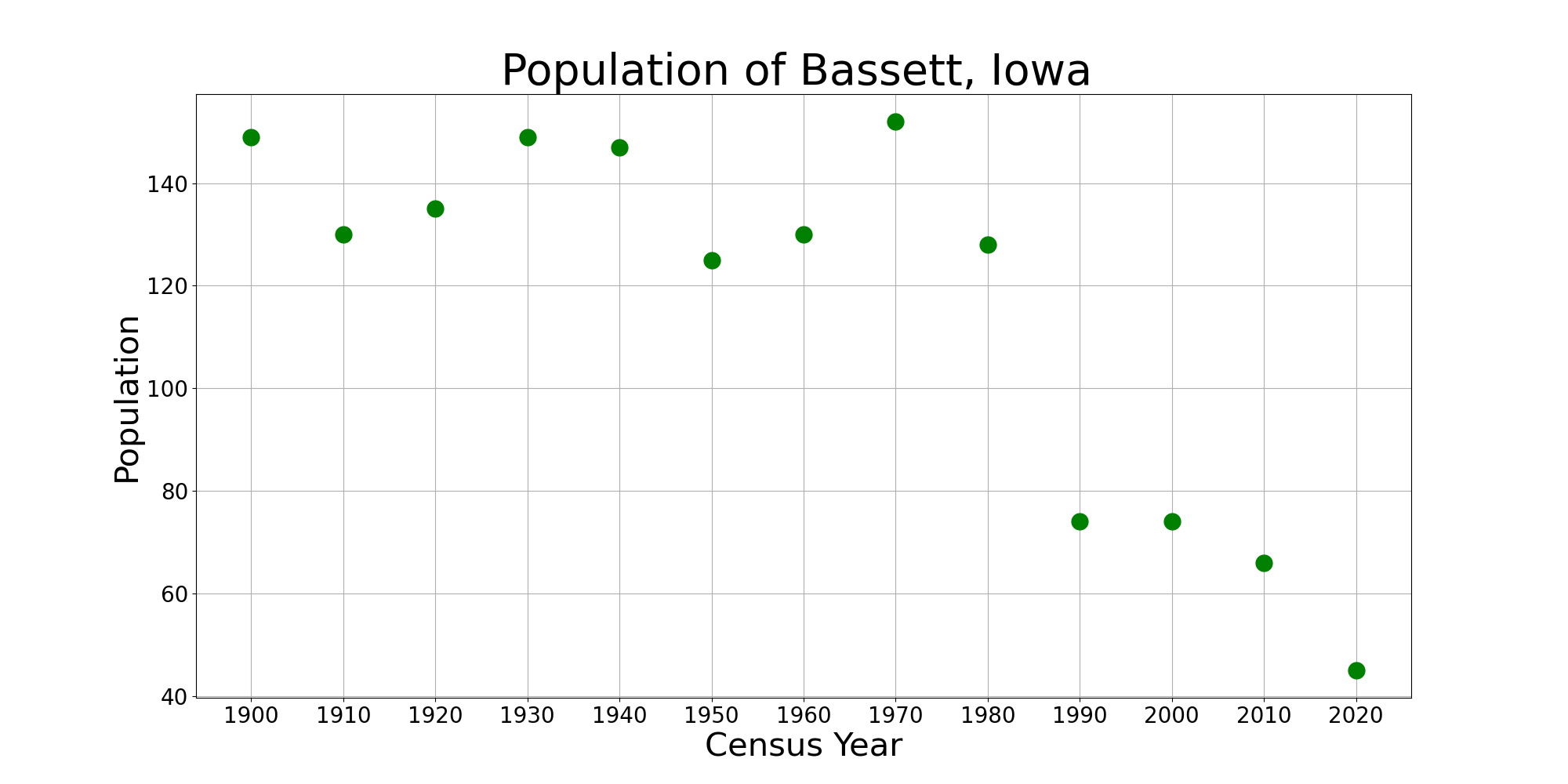
The population of Bassett, Iowa from US census data

=== 2020 census ===
As of the census of 2020, there were 45 people, 26 households, and 21 families residing in the city. The population density was 114.8 inhabitants per square mile (44.3/km^{2}). There were 26 housing units at an average density of 66.3 per square mile (25.6/km^{2}). The racial makeup of the city was 97.8% White, 0.0% Black or African American, 0.0% Native American, 0.0% Asian, 0.0% Pacific Islander, 2.2% from other races and 0.0% from two or more races. Hispanic or Latino persons of any race comprised 2.2% of the population.

Of the 26 households, 42.3% of which had children under the age of 18 living with them, 53.8% were married couples living together, 19.2% were cohabitating couples, 3.8% had a female householder with no spouse or partner present and 23.1% had a male householder with no spouse or partner present. 19.2% of all households were non-families. 19.2% of all households were made up of individuals, 3.8% had someone living alone who was 65 years old or older.

The median age in the city was 52.5 years. 15.6% of the residents were under the age of 20; 2.2% were between the ages of 20 and 24; 17.8% were from 25 and 44; 35.6% were from 45 and 64; and 28.9% were 65 years of age or older. The gender makeup of the city was 51.1% male and 48.9% female.

=== 2010 census ===
As of the census of 2010, there were 66 people, 28 households, and 22 families living in the city. The population density was 178.4 inhabitants per square mile (68.9/km^{2}). There were 37 housing units at an average density of 100.0 per square mile (38.6/km^{2}). The racial makeup of the city was 100.0% White.

There were 28 households, of which 25.0% had children under the age of 18 living with them, 60.7% were married couples living together, 10.7% had a female householder with no husband present, 7.1% had a male householder with no wife present, and 21.4% were non-families. 17.9% of all households were made up of individuals, and 3.6% had someone living alone who was 65 years of age or older. The average household size was 2.36 and the average family size was 2.55.

The median age in the city was 51.5 years. 18.2% of residents were under the age of 18; 0.0% were between the ages of 18 and 24; 18.1% were from 25 to 44; 47% were from 45 to 64; and 16.7% were 65 years of age or older. The gender makeup of the city was 53.0% male and 47.0% female.

=== 2000 census ===
As of the census of 2000, there were 74 people, 29 households and 18 families living in the city. The population density was 200.8 inhabitants per square mile (77.5/km^{2}). There were 34 housing units at an average density of 92.3 per square mile (35.6/km^{2}). The racial makeup of the city was 100.00% White.

There were 29 households, out of which 20.7% had children under the age of 18 living with them, 65.5% were married couples living together, and 34.5% were non-families. 20.7% of all households were made up of individuals, and 6.9% had someone living alone who was 65 years of age or older. The average household size was 2.55 and the average family size was 3.16.

In the city, the population was spread out, with 21.6% under the age of 18, 6.8% from 18 to 24, 25.7% from 25 to 44, 31.1% from 45 to 64, and 14.9% who were 65 years of age or older. The median age was 42 years. For every 100 females, there were 100.0 males. For every 100 females age 18 and over, there were 93.3 males.

The median income for a household in the city was $30,000, and the median income for a family was $28,750. Males had a median income of $28,333 versus $9,167 for females. The per capita income for the city was $13,131. There were 16.7% of families and 14.9% of the population living below the poverty line, including no under eighteens and none of those over 64.
