= Jacksonville Township, Chickasaw County, Iowa =

Jacksonville Township
- Township
- Location in Chickasaw County
- Coordinates: 43°08′23″N 092°15′45″W
- Country: United States
- State: Iowa
- County: Chickasaw

Area
  - Total: 53.93 sq mi (139.69 km^{2})
  - Land: 53.92 sq mi (139.65 km^{2})
  - Water: 0.015 sq mi (0.04 km^{2}) 0.03%
- Elevation: 1,234 ft (376 m)

Population (2000)
  - Total: 504
  - Density: 9.3/sq mi (3.6/km^{2})
- GNIS feature ID: 0468122

Jacksonville Township is one of twelve townships in Chickasaw County, Iowa, USA. As of the 2000 census, its population was 504.

== History ==
Jacksonville Township was organized in 1858.

== Geography ==
Jacksonville Township covers an area of 53.94 square miles (139.7 km^{2}) and contains no incorporated settlements. According to the USGS, it contains six cemeteries: Immanuel Lutheran, Jacksonville, Jerico Lutheran, Saint Patricks Catholic, Sargeant Farm and Yankee.
