= Richland Township, Chickasaw County, Iowa =

Richland Township
- Township
- Location in Chickasaw County
- Coordinates: 42°56′59″N 092°22′38″W
- Country: United States
- State: Iowa
- County: Chickasaw

Area
  - Total: 36.05 sq mi (93.38 km^{2})
  - Land: 35.96 sq mi (93.14 km^{2})
  - Water: 0.093 sq mi (0.24 km^{2}) 0.26%
- Elevation: 1,060 ft (323 m)

Population (2000)
  - Total: 369
  - Density: 10/sq mi (4/km^{2})
- GNIS feature ID: 0468600

Richland Township is one of twelve townships in Chickasaw County, Iowa, USA. As of the 2000 census, its population was 369.

== History ==
Richland Township was organized in 1856.

== Geography ==
Richland Township covers an area of 36.05 square miles (93.4 km^{2}) and contains no incorporated settlements. According to the USGS, it contains one cemetery, Richland Township.

The streams of Etter Creek and Little Wapsipinicon River run through this township.
