= Chickasaw County, Iowa =

County in Iowa, United States

- County
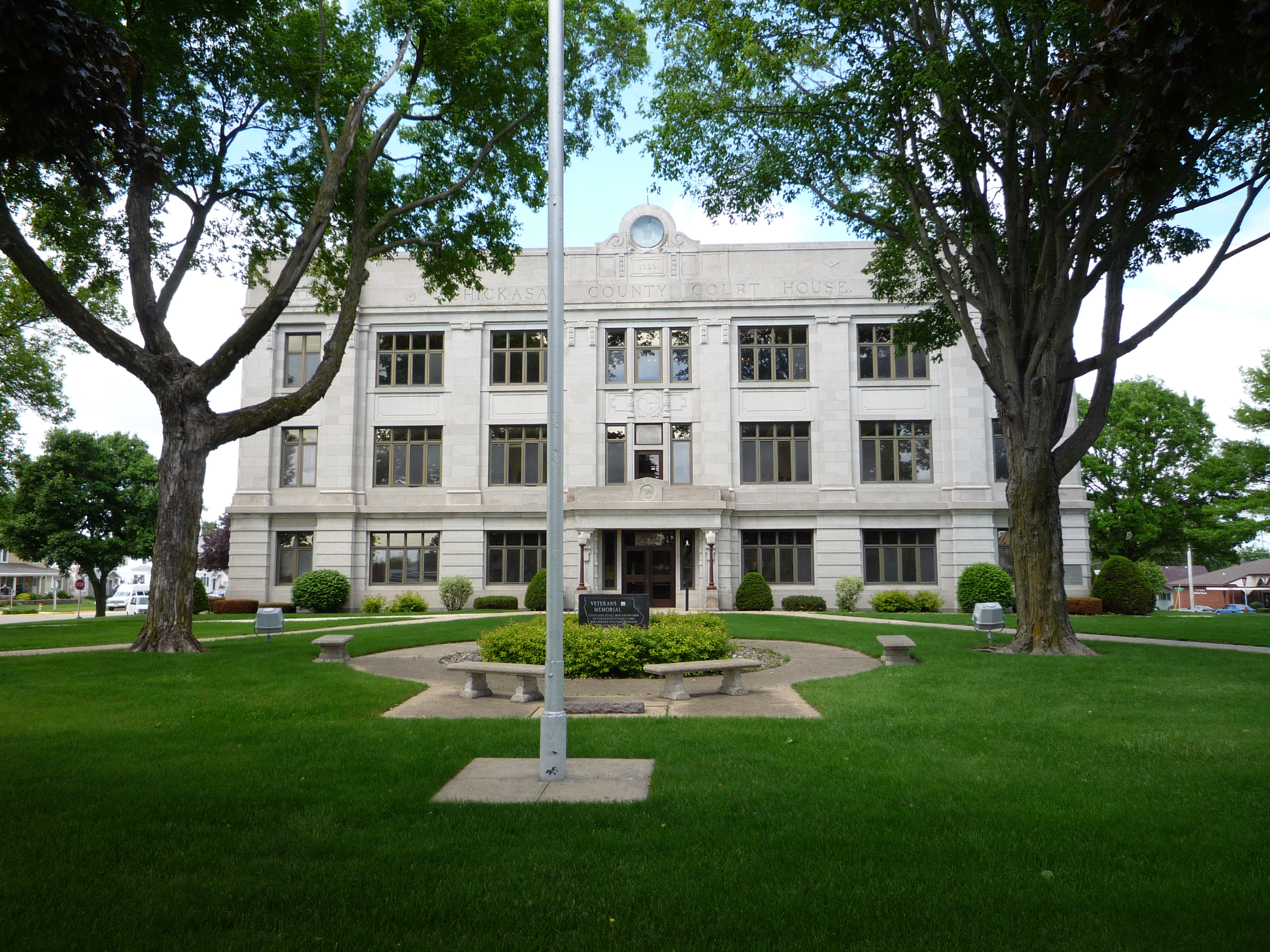
- Chickasaw County court house built in 1929

- Location within the U.S. state of Iowa
- Coordinates: 43°03′36″N 92°19′08″W
- Country: United States
- State: Iowa
- Founded: January 15, 1851
- Named for: Chickasaw people
- Seat: New Hampton
- Largest city: New Hampton

Area
  - Total: 506 sq mi (1,310 km^{2})
  - Land: 504 sq mi (1,310 km^{2})
  - Water: 1.3 sq mi (3.4 km^{2}) 0.3%

Population (2020)
  - Total: 12,012
  - Estimate (2025): 11,663 ▼
  - Density: 23.8/sq mi (9.20/km^{2})
- Time zone: UTC−6 (Central)
  - Summer (DST): UTC−5 (CDT)
- Congressional district: 2nd
- Website: chickasawcounty.iowa.gov
- Iowa county number 19

Chickasaw County is a county located in the U.S. state of Iowa. As of the 2020 census, the population was 12,012. Its county seat is New Hampton. The county was named for the southern Indian Nation whose chief was Bradford.

== History ==
Chickasaw County was founded in January 1851. It was named after the Chickasaw tribe, which lived in the Southern United States at the time.

The first nonindigenous settlers arrived in 1848 and the first county seat was from 1854 in Bradford, in the southwestern corner of the county. In the spring of 1857, the seat was moved to New Hampton, located near the geographic center, and was then called Chickasaw Center. The first county offices were housed in private houses and in the school building. The first courthouse, a wood-frame building, was erected in 1865. That building was enlarged in 1876, but a fire on March 26, 1880, destroyed it (townspeople managed to save the records). A brick/stone replacement structure was completed in 1881, and included a soaring clock tower. This building was enlarged in 1905 and again in 1906, but by the twenties it again was too small. The present structure, featuring Bedford stone, was built in 1929 and put into use in 1930.

== Geography ==
According to the United States Census Bureau, the county has a total area of 506 square miles (1,310 km^{2}), of which 504 square miles (1,310 km^{2}) is land and 1.3 square miles (3.4 km^{2}) (0.3%) is water.

=== Adjacent counties ===
- Bremer County (south)
- Butler County (southwest)
- Fayette County (southeast)
- Floyd County (west)
- Howard County (north)
- Mitchell County (northwest)
- Winneshiek County (northeast)

=== Highways ===
- U.S. Highway 18
- U.S. Highway 63
- U.S. Highway 218
- Iowa Highway 24
- Iowa Highway 27
- Iowa Highway 346

== Demographics ==
Historical population
Census	Pop.	Note	%±
1860	4,336		—
1870	10,180		134.8%
1880	14,534		42.8%
1890	15,019		3.3%
1900	17,037		13.4%
1910	15,375		−9.8%
1920	15,431		0.4%
1930	14,637		−5.1%
1940	15,227		4.0%
1950	15,228		0.0%
1960	15,034		−1.3%
1970	14,969		−0.4%
1980	15,437		3.1%
1990	13,295		−13.9%
2000	13,095		−1.5%
2010	12,439		−5.0%
2020	12,012		−3.4%
2025 (est.)	11,663	▼	−2.9%
U.S. Decennial Census; 1790-1960 1900-1990; 1990-2000 2010-2018

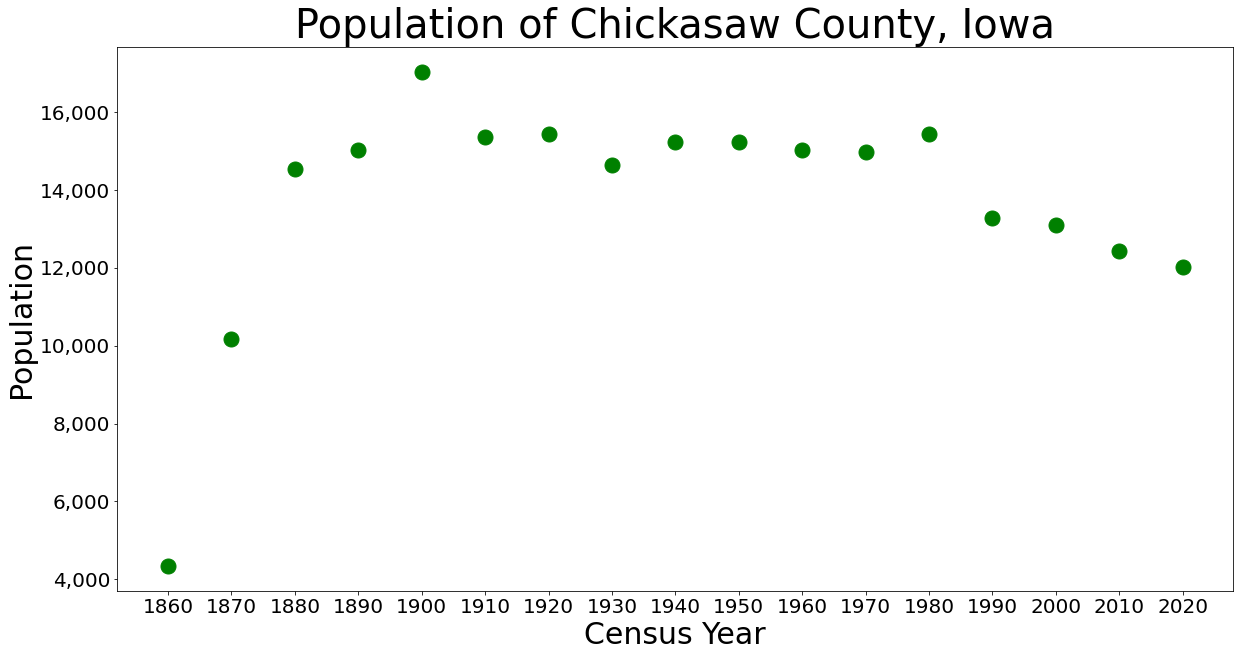
Population of Chickasaw County from US census data

=== 2020 census ===
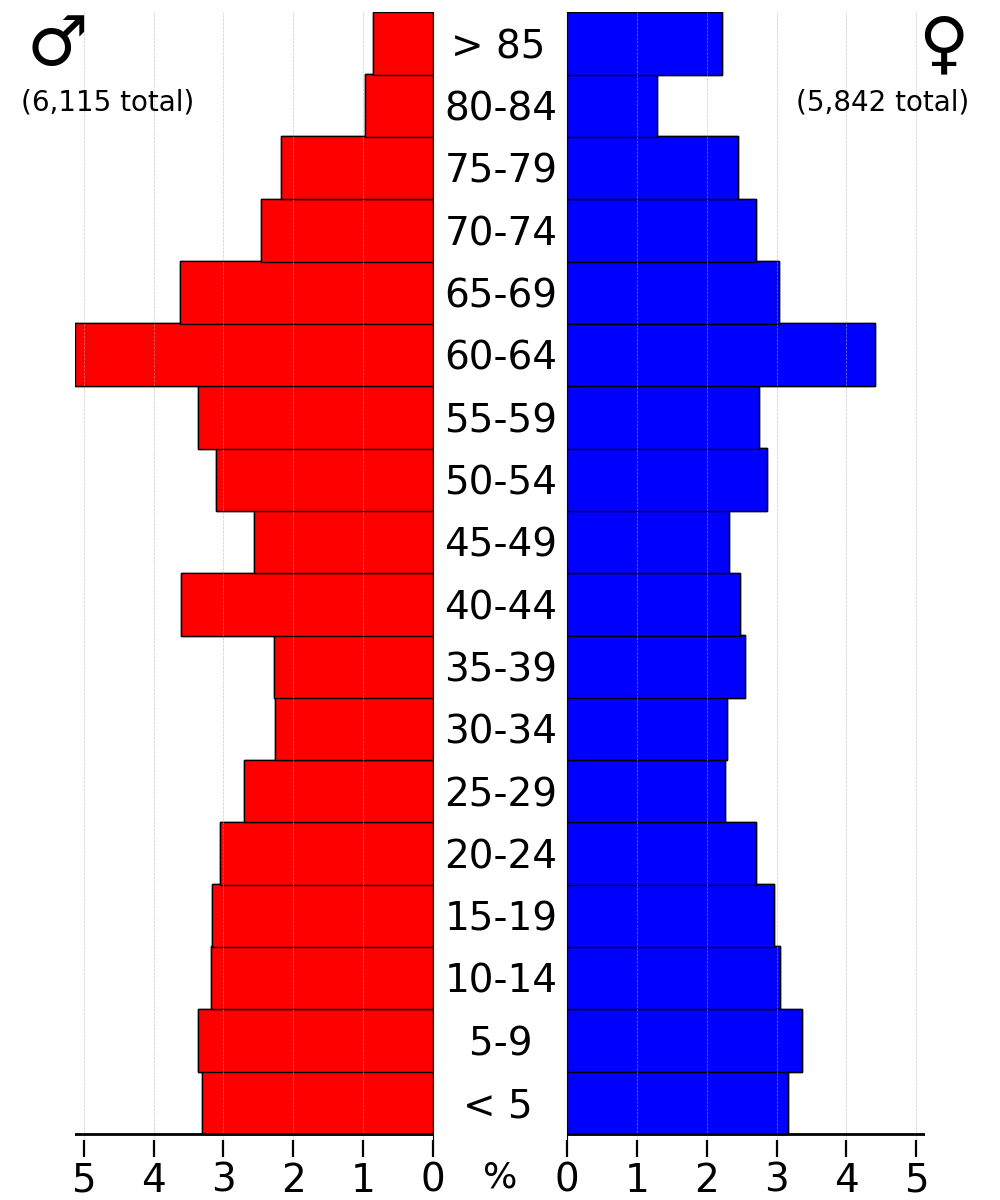
2022 US Census population pyramid for Chickasaw County from ACS 5-year estimates

As of the 2020 census, the county had a population of 12,012 and a population density of 23.7/sq mi (9.2/km^{2}). The median age was 43.8 years, with 23.6% of residents under the age of 18 and 21.8% of residents 65 years of age or older. For every 100 females there were 100.9 males, and for every 100 females age 18 and over there were 101.1 males age 18 and over. 96.29% of the population reported being of one race.

The racial makeup of the county was 93.7% White, 0.7% Black or African American, 0.2% American Indian and Alaska Native, 0.2% Asian, 0.1% Native Hawaiian and Pacific Islander, 1.5% from some other race, and 3.7% from two or more races. Hispanic or Latino residents of any race comprised 4.0% of the population.

There were 5,022 households in the county, of which 26.2% had children under the age of 18 living in them. Of all households, 53.4% were married-couple households, 19.8% were households with a male householder and no spouse or partner present, and 20.8% were households with a female householder and no spouse or partner present. About 30.3% of all households were made up of individuals and 14.7% had someone living alone who was 65 years of age or older. There were 5,534 housing units, of which 9.3% were vacant. Among occupied housing units, 79.8% were owner-occupied and 20.2% were renter-occupied. The homeowner vacancy rate was 1.3% and the rental vacancy rate was 11.8%.

Less than 0.1% of residents lived in urban areas, while 100.0% lived in rural areas.

=== 2010 census ===
The 2010 census recorded a population of 12,439 in the county, with a population density of 24.6/sq mi (9.5/km^{2}). There were 5,679 housing units, of which 5,204 were occupied.

=== 2000 census ===
As of the census of 2000, there were 13,095 people, 5,192 households, and 3,644 families residing in the county. The population density was 26 people per square mile (10 people/km^{2}). There were 5,593 housing units at an average density of 11 units per square mile (4.2 units/km^{2}). The racial makeup of the county was 98.75% White, 0.05% Black or African American, 0.03% Native American, 0.27% Asian, 0.01% Pacific Islander, 0.29% from other races, and 0.60% from two or more races. 0.63% of the population were Hispanic or Latino of any race.

There were 5,192 households, out of which 31.90% had children under the age of 18 living with them, 60.70% were married couples living together, 6.30% had a female householder with no husband present, and 29.80% were non-families. 26.10% of all households were made up of individuals, and 13.70% had someone living alone who was 65 years of age or older. The average household size was 2.48 and the average family size was 3.00.

In the county, the population was spread out, with 26.10% under the age of 18, 6.90% from 18 to 24, 25.60% from 25 to 44, 23.40% from 45 to 64, and 17.90% who were 65 years of age or older. The median age was 40 years. For every 100 females there were 100.10 males. For every 100 females age 18 and over, there were 96.50 males.

The median income for a household in the county was $37,649, and the median income for a family was $44,306. Males had a median income of $30,099 versus $21,309 for females. The per capita income for the county was $18,237. About 5.90% of families and 8.30% of the population were below the poverty line, including 9.90% of those under age 18 and 7.70% of those age 65 or over.

Chickasaw County posted the highest county unemployment rate in Iowa in the 2000 Census with 8% of the workforce unemployed. This figure, however, was still relatively low compared to the problems faced by many other counties in the Midwest.

== Communities ==
=== Cities ===
- Alta Vista
- Bassett
- Fredericksburg
- Ionia
- Lawler
- Nashua
- New Hampton
- North Washington
- Protivin

=== Unincorporated communities ===
- Boyd
- Bradford
- Deerfield
- Jerico
- Little Turkey
- Saude

=== Townships ===
- Bradford
- Chickasaw
- Dayton
- Deerfield
- Dresden
- Fredericksburg
- Jacksonville
- New Hampton
- Richland
- Stapleton
- Utica
- Washington

=== Population ranking ===
The population ranking of the following table is based on the 2020 census of Chickasaw County.

† county seat

Rank	City/Town/etc.	Municipal type	Population (2020 Census)
1	† New Hampton	City	3,494
2	Nashua (partially in Floyd County)	City	1,551
3	Fredericksburg	City	987
4	Lawler	City	406
5	Ionia	City	226
6	Protivin (mostly in Howard County)	City	269
7	Alta Vista	City	227
8	North Washington	City	112
9	Bassett	City	45

== Politics ==
Chickasaw County was a bellwether county from 1948 to 1984, voting for the nationwide winner in every election in that span. From 1988 to 2012, the county favored Democrats, as the Democratic nominee won the county by at least 10% in each election in that span except for 2000. Then, in 2016, Chickasaw County swung significantly to the right, shifting from Barack Obama winning the county by 11% in 2012 to Donald Trump winning by 23% in 2016, a shift of 34% to the right. Trump won over 58% of the county's vote, turning in the best performance for a Republican since the 1952 landslide election of Dwight D. Eisenhower. Trump further improved on this performance in 2020, taking nearly 65% of the vote and winning by a margin of over 31%, the best vote share and margin of victory for any candidate in Chickasaw County since the 1932 landslide election of Franklin D. Roosevelt. Trump once again improved in 2024, winning nearly 68% of the county's vote and earning the greatest margin of victory in Chickasaw County since at least the beginning of the 20th century.

United States presidential election results for Chickasaw County, Iowa
Year	Republican		Democratic		Third party(ies)	
Year	No.	%	No.	%	No.	%
1896	1,967	48.20%	2,084	51.07%	30	0.74%
1900	2,085	49.71%	2,063	49.19%	46	1.10%
1904	1,972	51.74%	1,790	46.97%	49	1.29%
1908	1,571	44.87%	1,877	53.61%	53	1.51%
1912	1,022	28.15%	1,891	52.08%	718	19.77%
1916	1,999	53.61%	1,697	45.51%	33	0.88%
1920	4,517	66.98%	2,171	32.19%	56	0.83%
1924	3,416	46.50%	1,736	23.63%	2,195	29.88%
1928	3,712	50.20%	3,665	49.57%	17	0.23%
1932	2,585	33.68%	5,047	65.75%	44	0.57%
1936	3,143	39.96%	4,458	56.67%	265	3.37%
1940	4,440	52.71%	3,981	47.26%	2	0.02%
1944	3,575	51.59%	3,328	48.03%	26	0.38%
1948	3,449	45.45%	4,071	53.64%	69	0.91%
1952	5,022	63.18%	2,921	36.75%	6	0.08%
1956	4,205	56.10%	3,275	43.70%	15	0.20%
1960	3,822	48.45%	4,063	51.50%	4	0.05%
1964	2,632	36.65%	4,545	63.28%	5	0.07%
1968	3,510	51.89%	2,966	43.85%	288	4.26%
1972	3,836	54.57%	3,134	44.58%	60	0.85%
1976	3,432	49.11%	3,503	50.13%	53	0.76%
1980	3,929	52.86%	2,935	39.49%	569	7.66%
1984	3,661	52.93%	3,186	46.06%	70	1.01%
1988	2,549	41.54%	3,530	57.53%	57	0.93%
1992	2,129	32.06%	2,913	43.87%	1,598	24.07%
1996	2,191	34.45%	3,355	52.75%	814	12.80%
2000	2,936	44.59%	3,435	52.17%	213	3.24%
2004	3,040	44.67%	3,708	54.48%	58	0.85%
2008	2,557	38.82%	3,923	59.57%	106	1.61%
2012	2,836	43.74%	3,554	54.81%	94	1.45%
2016	3,742	58.15%	2,266	35.21%	427	6.64%
2020	4,308	64.97%	2,233	33.68%	90	1.36%
2024	4,234	67.86%	1,919	30.76%	86	1.38%

== See also ==
- National Register of Historic Places listings in Chickasaw County, Iowa
- The Chickasaw County Courthouse Article
- Iowa GenWeb - Chickasaw County
- Chickasaw County website
