= North Washington, Iowa =

- City
- Location of North Washington, Iowa
- Coordinates: 43°07′02″N 92°24′54″W
- Country: USA
- State: Iowa
- County: Chickasaw

Area
  - Total: 0.20 sq mi (0.53 km^{2})
  - Land: 0.20 sq mi (0.53 km^{2})
  - Water: 0 sq mi (0.00 km^{2})
- Elevation: 1,145 ft (349 m)

Population (2020)
  - Total: 112
  - Density: 552.2/sq mi (213.22/km^{2})
- Time zone: UTC-6 (Central (CST))
  - Summer (DST): UTC-5 (CDT)
- ZIP code: 50661
- Area code: 641
- FIPS code: 19-57495
- GNIS feature ID: 2395263

North Washington is a city in Chickasaw County, Iowa, United States. The population was 112 at the time of the 2020 census.

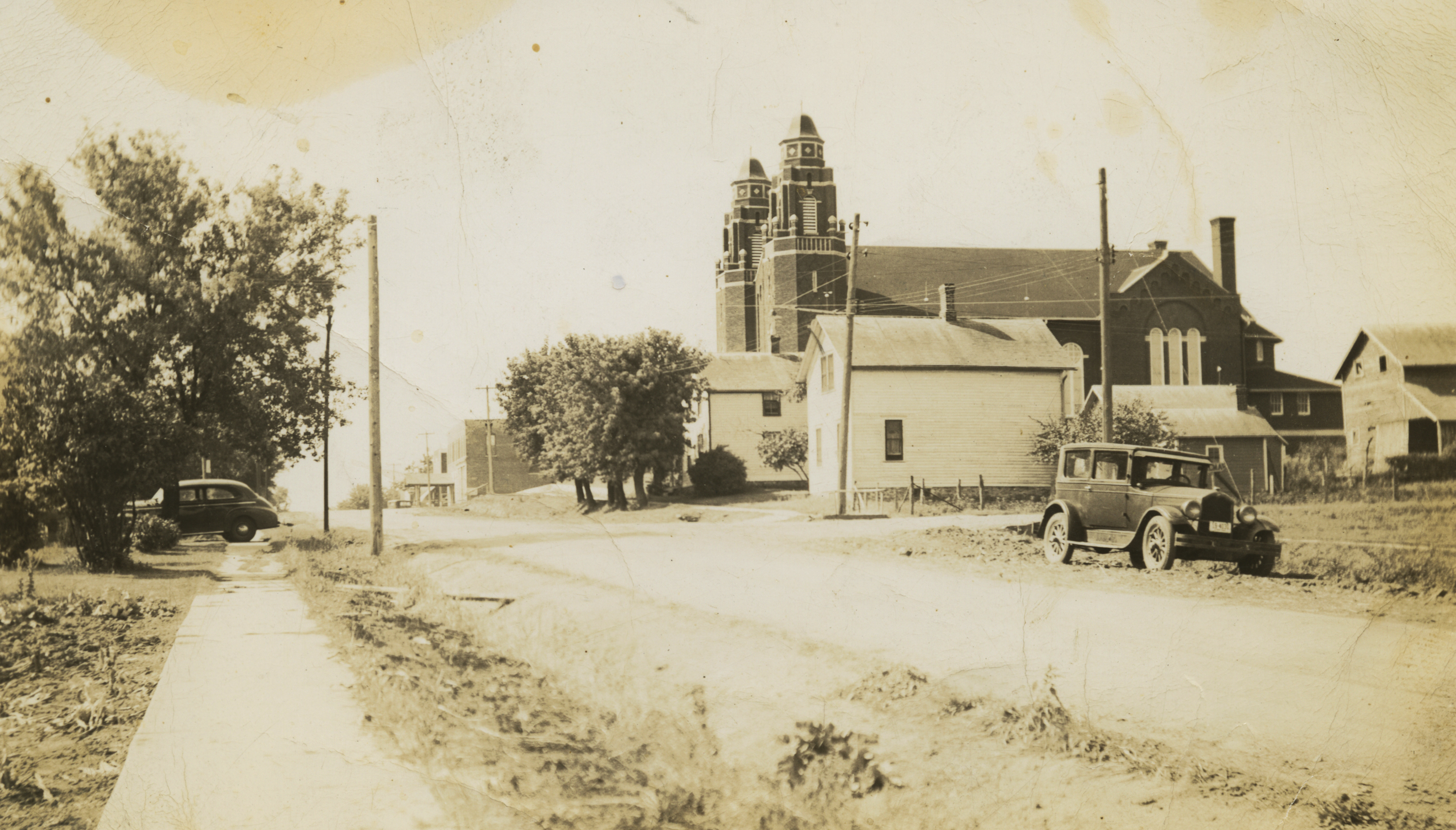
Mainstreet, 1930

== Geography ==
According to the United States Census Bureau, the city has a total area of 0.20 square miles (0.52 km^{2}), all land.

== Demographics ==
Historical populations
Year	Pop.	±%
1910	132	—
1920	124	−6.1%
1930	110	−11.3%
1940	138	+25.5%
1950	159	+15.2%
1960	156	−1.9%
1970	134	−14.1%
1980	142	+6.0%
1990	107	−24.6%
2000	118	+10.3%
2010	117	−0.8%
2020	112	−4.3%
Source:"U.S. Census website". United States Census Bureau. and Iowa Data Center; Source: U.S. Decennial Census

=== 2020 census ===
As of the census of 2020, there were 112 people, 45 households, and 39 families residing in the city. The population density was 552.2 inhabitants per square mile (213.2/km^{2}). There were 45 housing units at an average density of 221.9 per square mile (85.7/km^{2}). The racial makeup of the city was 97.3% White, 1.8% Black or African American, 0.0% Native American, 0.0% Asian, 0.0% Pacific Islander, 0.9% from other races and 0.0% from two or more races. Hispanic or Latino persons of any race comprised 2.7% of the population.

Of the 45 households, 46.7% of which had children under the age of 18 living with them, 75.6% were married couples living together, 4.4% were cohabitating couples, 4.4% had a female householder with no spouse or partner present and 15.6% had a male householder with no spouse or partner present. 13.3% of all households were non-families. 11.1% of all households were made up of individuals, 2.2% had someone living alone who was 65 years old or older.

The median age in the city was 41.3 years. 25.9% of the residents were under the age of 20; 4.5% were between the ages of 20 and 24; 23.2% were from 25 and 44; 26.8% were from 45 and 64; and 19.6% were 65 years of age or older. The gender makeup of the city was 52.7% male and 47.3% female.

=== 2010 census ===
As of the census of 2010, there were 117 people, 43 households, and 31 families living in the city. The population density was 585.0 inhabitants per square mile (225.9/km^{2}). There were 45 housing units at an average density of 225.0 per square mile (86.9/km^{2}). The racial makeup of the city was 97.4% White, 1.7% African American, and 0.9% from other races. Hispanic or Latino of any race were 2.6% of the population.

There were 43 households, of which 44.2% had children under the age of 18 living with them, 65.1% were married couples living together, 2.3% had a female householder with no husband present, 4.7% had a male householder with no wife present, and 27.9% were non-families. 23.3% of all households were made up of individuals, and 4.6% had someone living alone who was 65 years of age or older. The average household size was 2.72 and the average family size was 3.19.

The median age in the city was 38.2 years. 29.9% of residents were under the age of 18; 8.6% were between the ages of 18 and 24; 22.2% were from 25 to 44; 31.6% were from 45 to 64; and 7.7% were 65 years of age or older. The gender makeup of the city was 52.1% male and 47.9% female.

=== 2000 census ===
As of the census of 2000, there were 118 people, 47 households, and 32 families living in the city. The population density was 601.2 inhabitants per square mile (232.1/km^{2}). There were 49 housing units at an average density of 249.6 per square mile (96.4/km^{2}). The racial makeup of the city was 98.31% White, and 1.69% from two or more races.

There were 47 households, out of which 53.2% had children under the age of 18 living with them, 57.4% were married couples living together, 6.4% had a female householder with no husband present, and 29.8% were non-families. 25.5% of all households were made up of individuals, and 17.0% had someone living alone who was 65 years of age or older. The average household size was 2.51 and the average family size was 3.03.

In the city, the population was spread out, with 31.4% under the age of 18, 6.8% from 18 to 24, 30.5% from 25 to 44, 19.5% from 45 to 64, and 11.9% who were 65 years of age or older. The median age was 34 years. For every 100 females, there were 107.0 males. For every 100 females age 18 and over, there were 88.4 males.

The median income for a household in the city was $38,542, and the median income for a family was $41,667. Males had a median income of $29,306 versus $26,250 for females. The per capita income for the city was $15,611. There were 7.9% of families and 5.8% of the population living below the poverty line, including 5.9% of under eighteens and 11.1% of those over 64.

== Education ==
It is within the New Hampton Community School District.

== Notable person ==
- Joe Meyers, American football coach
