= New Hampton, Iowa =

- City
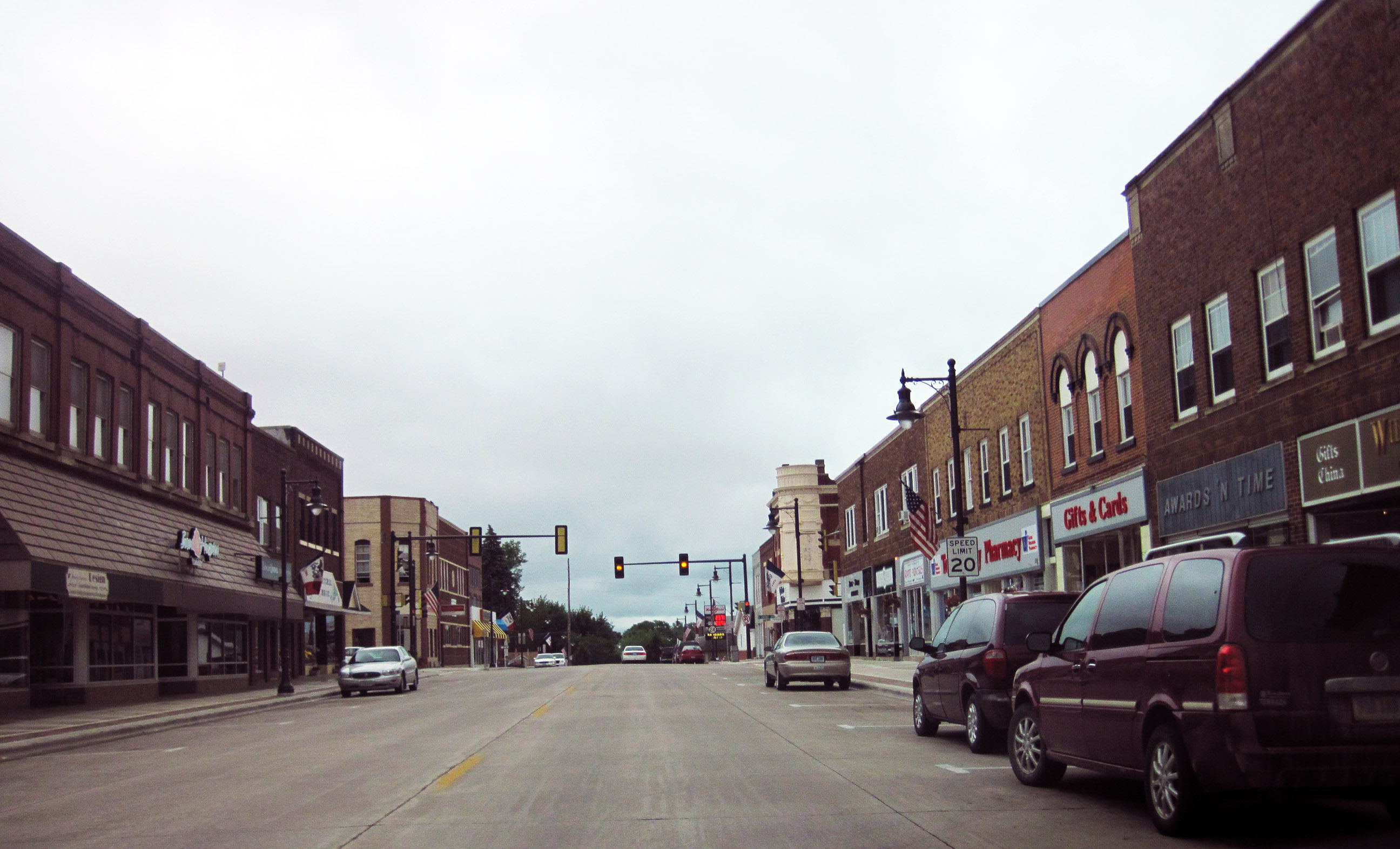
- Downtown New Hampton

- Location of New Hampton, Iowa
- Coordinates: 43°03′23″N 92°18′55″W
- Country: USA
- State: Iowa
- County: Chickasaw
- Incorporated: April 26, 1873

Area
  - Total: 3.36 sq mi (8.69 km^{2})
  - Land: 3.35 sq mi (8.68 km^{2})
  - Water: 0.0039 sq mi (0.01 km^{2})
- Elevation: 1,158 ft (353 m)

Population (2020)
  - Total: 3,494
  - Density: 1,042.3/sq mi (402.45/km^{2})
- Time zone: UTC-6 (Central (CST))
  - Summer (DST): UTC-5 (CDT)
- ZIP codes: 50659, 50661
- Area code: 641
- FIPS code: 19-56100
- GNIS feature ID: 2395196
- Website: www.newhamptonia.com

New Hampton is a city in and the county seat of Chickasaw County, Iowa, United States. The population was 3,494 at the time of the 2020 census.

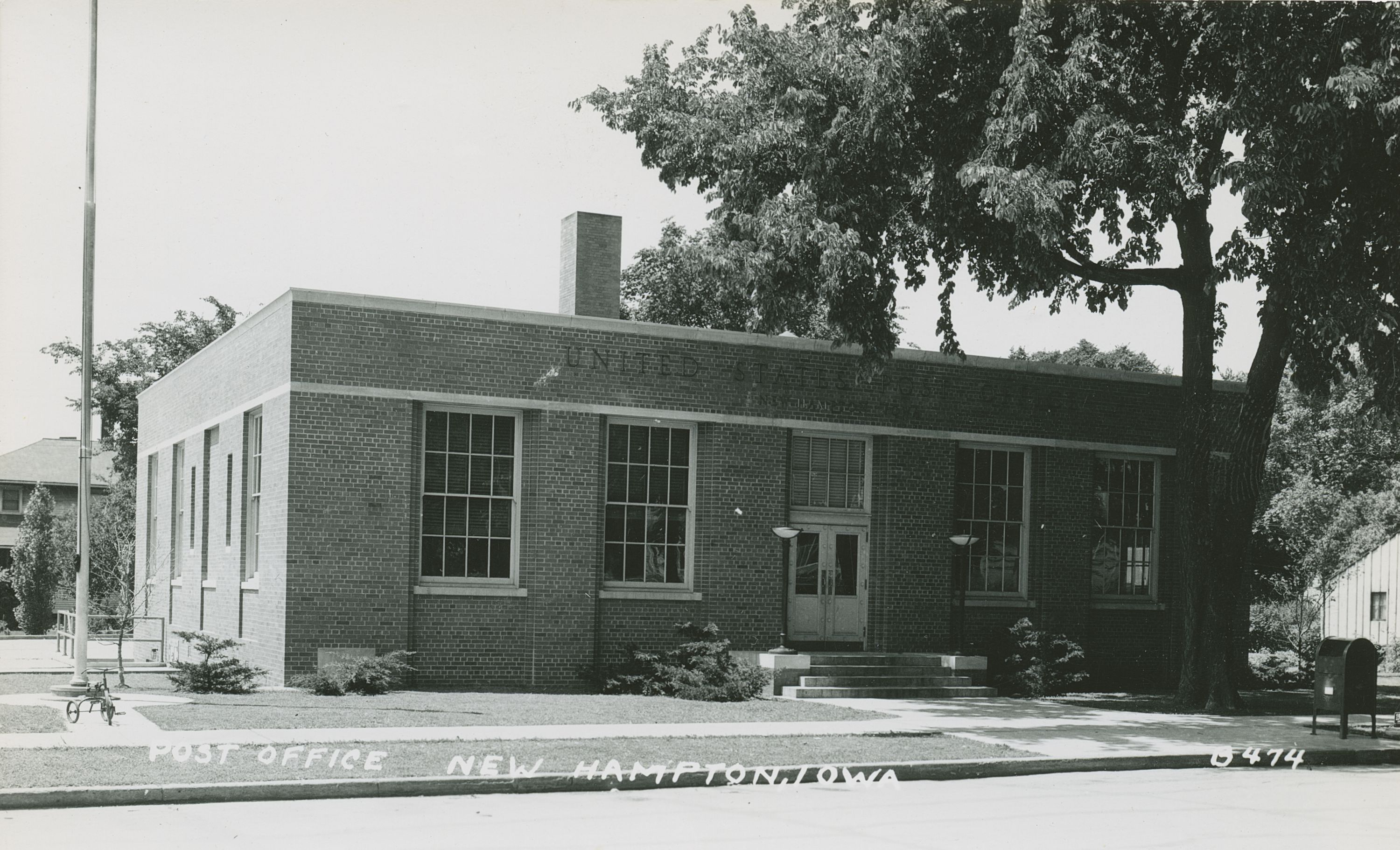
Post Office in New Hampton, Iowa

== History ==
New Hampton was founded c. 1855. It is named after New Hampton, New Hampshire, the native town of one of its founders.

== Geography ==
According to the United States Census Bureau, the city has a total area of 3.16 square miles (8.18 km^{2}), all land.

=== Climate ===
Climate data for New Hampton, Iowa (1991–2020 normals, extremes 1897–present)
| Month | Jan | Feb | Mar | Apr | May | Jun | Jul | Aug | Sep | Oct | Nov | Dec | Year |
|---|---|---|---|---|---|---|---|---|---|---|---|---|---|
| Record high °F (°C) | 61 (16) | 65 (18) | 84 (29) | 94 (34) | 105 (41) | 105 (41) | 110 (43) | 104 (40) | 101 (38) | 95 (35) | 78 (26) | 64 (18) | 110 (43) |
| Mean daily maximum °F (°C) | 23.3 (−4.8) | 27.8 (−2.3) | 41.0 (5.0) | 56.3 (13.5) | 68.0 (20.0) | 78.0 (25.6) | 80.8 (27.1) | 78.8 (26.0) | 72.6 (22.6) | 59.1 (15.1) | 42.8 (6.0) | 29.1 (−1.6) | 54.8 (12.7) |
| Daily mean °F (°C) | 14.4 (−9.8) | 18.8 (−7.3) | 31.7 (−0.2) | 45.2 (7.3) | 57.2 (14.0) | 67.5 (19.7) | 70.5 (21.4) | 68.4 (20.2) | 61.0 (16.1) | 48.0 (8.9) | 33.3 (0.7) | 20.8 (−6.2) | 44.7 (7.1) |
| Mean daily minimum °F (°C) | 5.5 (−14.7) | 9.8 (−12.3) | 22.4 (−5.3) | 34.1 (1.2) | 46.5 (8.1) | 56.9 (13.8) | 60.2 (15.7) | 58.0 (14.4) | 49.3 (9.6) | 36.9 (2.7) | 23.8 (−4.6) | 12.4 (−10.9) | 34.6 (1.4) |
| Record low °F (°C) | −34 (−37) | −33 (−36) | −25 (−32) | 5 (−15) | 20 (−7) | 34 (1) | 41 (5) | 35 (2) | 19 (−7) | 0 (−18) | −14 (−26) | −29 (−34) | −34 (−37) |
| Average precipitation inches (mm) | 1.31 (33) | 1.38 (35) | 2.35 (60) | 4.18 (106) | 4.95 (126) | 6.59 (167) | 4.99 (127) | 4.59 (117) | 3.83 (97) | 2.66 (68) | 2.07 (53) | 1.67 (42) | 40.57 (1,030) |
| Average snowfall inches (cm) | 9.7 (25) | 10.3 (26) | 6.2 (16) | 1.4 (3.6) | 0.0 (0.0) | 0.0 (0.0) | 0.0 (0.0) | 0.0 (0.0) | 0.0 (0.0) | 0.1 (0.25) | 2.9 (7.4) | 7.9 (20) | 38.5 (98) |
| Average precipitation days (≥ 0.01 in) | 6.2 | 5.5 | 7.3 | 9.3 | 10.9 | 10.0 | 7.8 | 7.7 | 7.5 | 6.8 | 5.4 | 6.2 | 90.6 |
| Average snowy days (≥ 0.1 in) | 4.5 | 4.0 | 2.3 | 0.7 | 0.0 | 0.0 | 0.0 | 0.0 | 0.0 | 0.1 | 1.6 | 4.2 | 17.4 |
Source: NOAA

== Demographics ==
Historical population
| Year | Pop. | ±% |
|---|---|---|
| 1870 | 455 | — |
| 1880 | 1,105 | +142.9% |
| 1890 | 1,314 | +18.9% |
| 1900 | 2,339 | +78.0% |
| 1910 | 2,275 | −2.7% |
| 1920 | 2,539 | +11.6% |
| 1930 | 2,458 | −3.2% |
| 1940 | 2,933 | +19.3% |
| 1950 | 3,323 | +13.3% |
| 1960 | 3,456 | +4.0% |
| 1970 | 3,621 | +4.8% |
| 1980 | 3,940 | +8.8% |
| 1990 | 3,660 | −7.1% |
| 2000 | 3,692 | +0.9% |
| 2010 | 3,571 | −3.3% |
| 2020 | 3,494 | −2.2% |
Source: "U.S. Census website". United States Census Bureau. Source: U.S. Decennial Census

=== 2020 census ===
As of the 2020 census, New Hampton had a population of 3,494. There were 894 families residing in the city. The population density was 1,042.3 inhabitants per square mile (402.4/km^{2}).

The median age was 42.8 years. 21.9% of residents were under the age of 18. 24.4% of residents were under the age of 20; 4.4% were between the ages of 20 and 24; 22.8% were from 25 to 44; 25.9% were from 45 to 64; and 22.6% were 65 years of age or older. The gender makeup of the city was 47.9% male and 52.1% female. For every 100 females there were 92.1 males, and for every 100 females age 18 and over there were 91.5 males age 18 and over.

There were 1,535 households, of which 25.5% had children under the age of 18 living in them. Of all households, 45.5% were married-couple households, 6.8% were cohabiting-couple households, 20.1% had a male householder with no spouse or partner present, and 27.7% had a female householder with no spouse or partner present. About 41.8% of all households were non-families, 36.6% of all households were made up of individuals, and 18.6% had someone living alone who was 65 years of age or older.

0.0% of residents lived in urban areas, while 100.0% lived in rural areas.

There were 1,705 housing units, of which 10.0% were vacant. The homeowner vacancy rate was 1.1% and the rental vacancy rate was 16.6%.

Racial composition as of the 2020 census
| Race | Number | Percent |
|---|---|---|
| White | 3,153 | 90.2% |
| Black or African American | 36 | 1.0% |
| American Indian and Alaska Native | 3 | 0.1% |
| Asian | 13 | 0.4% |
| Native Hawaiian and Other Pacific Islander | 2 | 0.1% |
| Some other race | 107 | 3.1% |
| Two or more races | 180 | 5.2% |
| Hispanic or Latino (of any race) | 275 | 7.9% |

=== 2010 census ===
As of the 2010 census, there were 3,571 people, 1,555 households, and 943 families living in the city. The population density was 1,130.1 inhabitants per square mile (436.3/km^{2}). There were 1,697 housing units at an average density of 537.0 per square mile (207.3/km^{2}). The racial makeup of the city was 96.0% White, 0.3% African American, 0.1% Native American, 0.5% Asian, 2.5% from other races, and 0.4% from two or more races. Hispanic or Latino of any race were 3.9% of the population.

The median age in the city was 44.8 years. 22.9% of residents were under the age of 18; 6.7% were between the ages of 18 and 24; 20.6% were from 25 to 44; 26.8% were from 45 to 64; and 23% were 65 years of age or older. The gender makeup of the city was 47.4% male and 52.6% female.

=== 2000 census ===
As of the 2000 census, there were 3,692 people, 1,545 households, and 976 families living in the city. The population density was 1,274.0 inhabitants per square mile (491.9/km^{2}). There were 1,658 housing units at an average density of 572.1 per square mile (220.9/km^{2}). The racial makeup of the city was 98.62% White, 0.03% Native American, 0.46% Asian, 0.03% Pacific Islander, 0.08% from other races, and 0.79% from two or more races. Hispanic or Latino of any race were 0.35% of the population.

There were 1,545 households, out of which 29.3% had children under the age of 18 living with them, 53.9% were married couples living together, 7.4% had a female householder with no husband present, and 36.8% were non-families. 33.5% of all households were made up of individuals, and 18.4% had someone living alone who was 65 years of age or older. The average household size was 2.28 and the average family size was 2.93.

Age spread: 23.1% under the age of 18, 7.3% from 18 to 24, 25.2% from 25 to 44, 21.6% from 45 to 64, and 22.8% who were 65 years of age or older. The median age was 41 years. For every 100 females, there were 90.9 males. For every 100 females age 18 and over, there were 82.5 males.

The median income for a household in the city was $40,082, and the median income for a family was $50,360. Males had a median income of $33,125 versus $21,217 for females. The per capita income for the city was $20,255. About 3.9% of families and 6.1% of the population were below the poverty line, including 6.0% of those under age 18 and 6.1% of those age 65 or over.

== Education ==
New Hampton Community School District operates local public schools.

St. Joseph's Catholic School, of the Roman Catholic Archdiocese of Dubuque, is in New Hampton. On August 15, 1904, the school building and convent, which had a cost of $15,000, were dedicated. A fire destroyed the building in November 1921; the cause was never uncovered. Construction on a new school began in spring 1922, with the cornerstone laid on May 1. C. O. Emery Construction company made the $56,731.67 two-story brick structure, which included a multipurpose room that housed a stage, auditorium, and/or gymnasium.

== Gallery ==
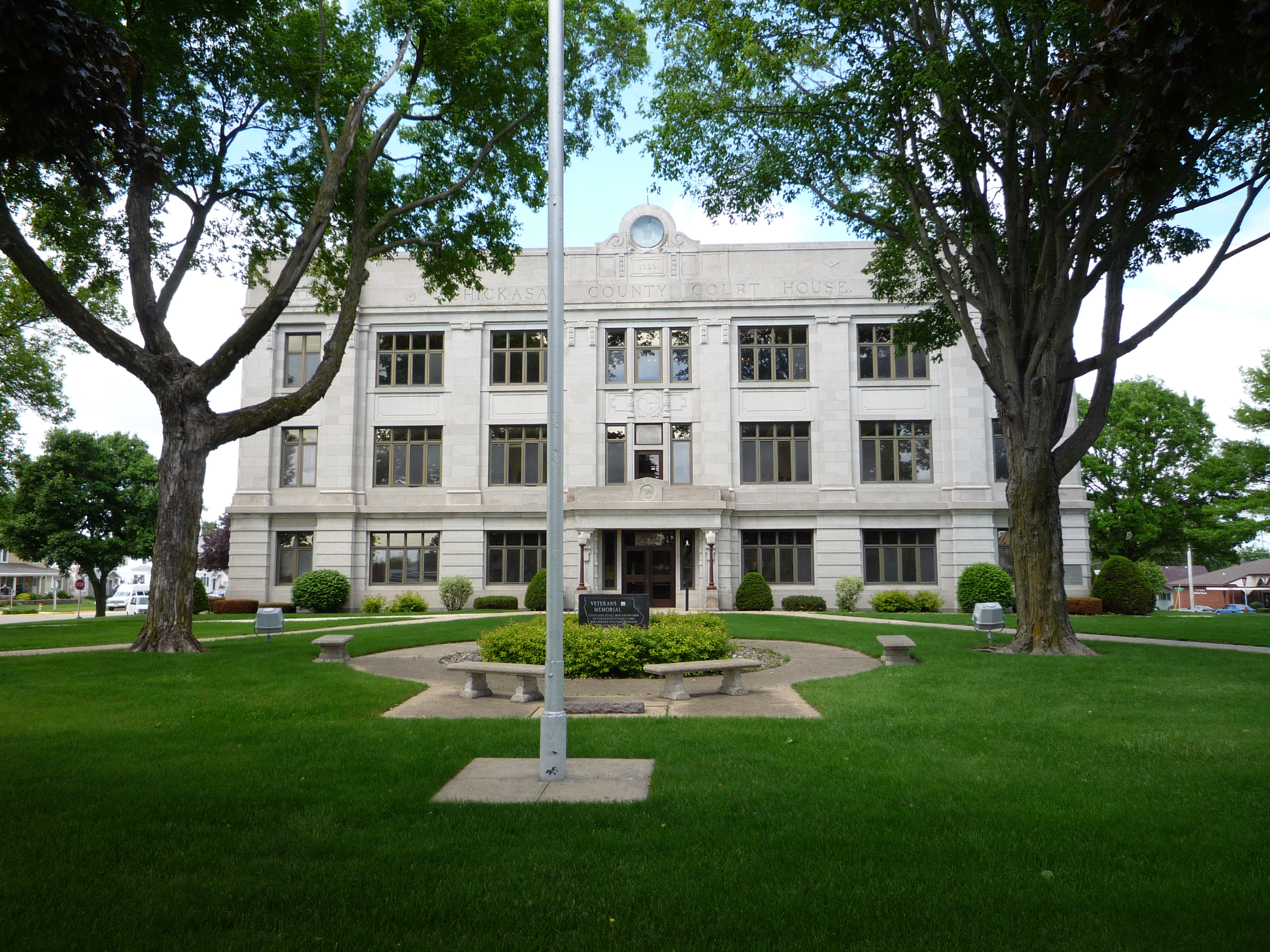
Built in 1929, the Chickasaw County Courthouse serves as the center for county services.

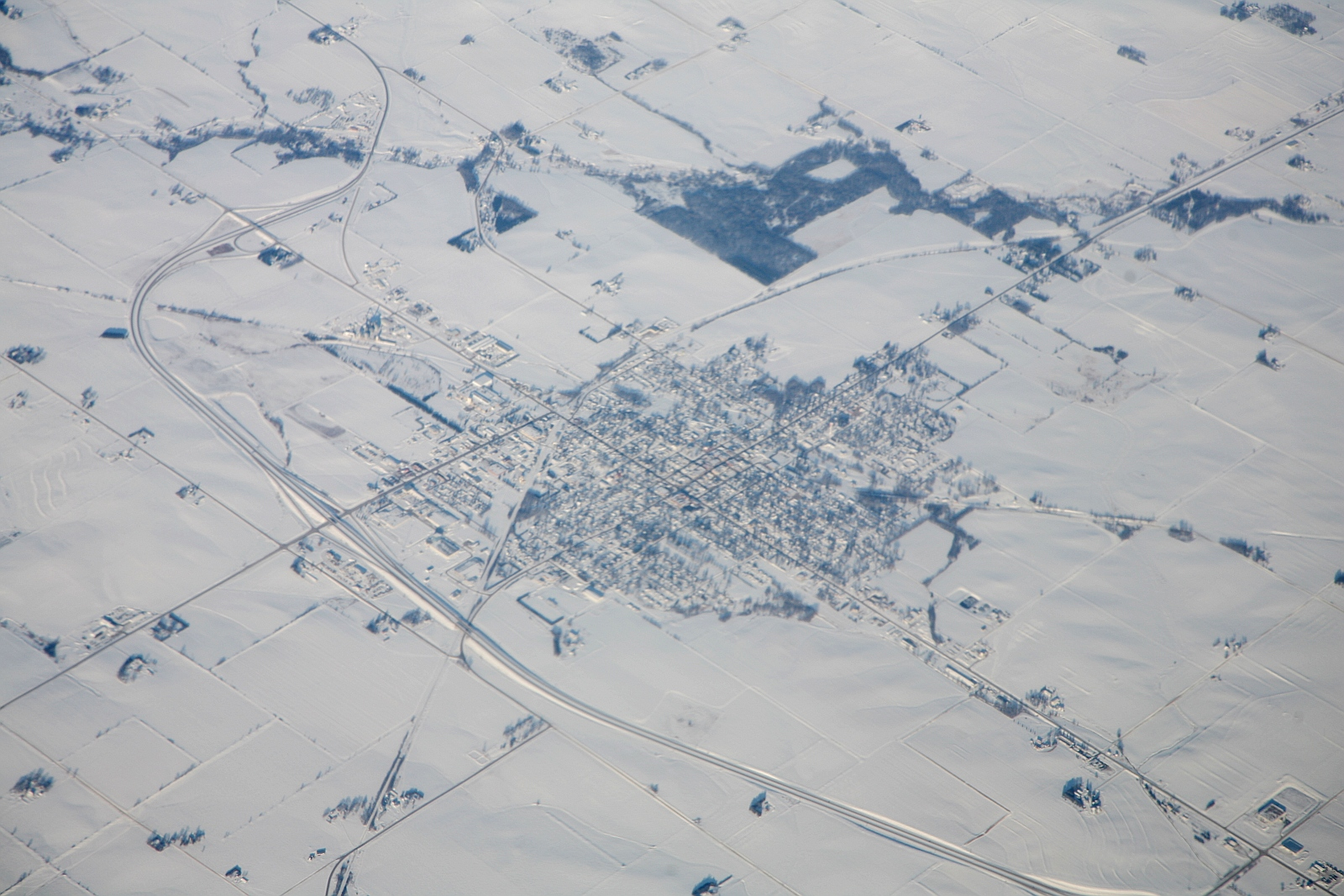
Aerial photograph of New Hampton from the southwest

== Notable people ==
- William Barloon - imprisoned in Iraq during Saddam Hussein's regime
- Rich Christensen — creator and producer of Pinks! on the Speed Channel
- Greg Ganske — former U.S. Representative
- Mike Humpal - former football player for the Pittsburgh Steelers and the Iowa Hawkeyes
- Duane Josephson — Major League Baseball catcher
- Kim Olson - military officer and political candidate
- Bertha M. Rice – writer, clubwoman, conservationist based in California
- Coleen Rowley — United States attorney
- Sarah Utterback — actress
- Carleton H. Wright — admiral in the US Navy
