= Vista, Iowa =

- former unincorporated community
- Location within the state of Iowa
- Coordinates: 42°24′48″N 91°59′14″W
- Country: USA
- State: Iowa
- County: Buchanan County
- Elevation: 278 m (912 ft)
- Time zone: UTC-6 (Central (CST))
  - Summer (DST): UTC-5 (CDT)
- GNIS feature ID: 464156

Vista was an unincorporated community in Buchanan County, Iowa, United States. It was located at the junction of local roads Freeman Avenue and 260th Street.

== Geography ==
Vista was in Section 26 of Westburg Township, at the junction of Freeman Avenue and 260th Street.

== History ==
=== Early years ===
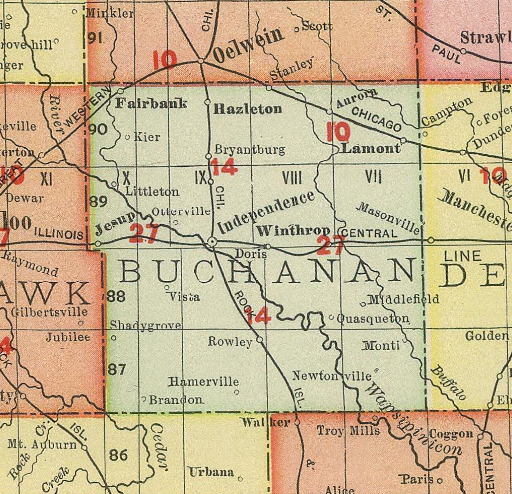
Vista was in west-central Buchanan County, Iowa, in 1903

Founded in the 19th century, Vista appeared on maps as early as the 1870s.

The Methodist Church in Vista, originally a Baptist congregation, was organized in 1878. The Vista post office opened in 1889. The Vista Creamery operated circa 1895, with D.A. McLeish the manager.

=== Twentieth century ===
The Vista post office closed in either 1903 or 1904. The History of Buchanan County, Iowa states the Vista Post office closed on December 31, 1904.

In 1914, the Vista Methodist Church had 35 members in its congregation. Vista's population was 28 in 1917. The Vista Methodist Church closed in 1922.

By the 1930s and 1940s, Vista was considered a former village, appearing in lists of former towns and villages alongside Shady Grove, Kiene, Newtonville, Atlantic, Gatesville, Coytown, Castleville, Monti, Middlefield, and the original Hazleton townsite; only a few farmhouses remain. Vista still occasionally appears on county maps.

In 1974, the owners of the property on which the school sat asked that the building be moved. The schoolhouse was moved a mile to the north that year by residents Mr. Circus (on whose land the school was moved) and Mr. Palmer Robinson, and they built a tiny new chapel next to it. A nearby steel shed was built to house antique John Deere equipment. A dedication ceremony opening the new Westburg Vista Community Center and Museum was held on June 20, 1976.

== See also ==
- Littleton, Iowa
