= Bryantsburg, Iowa =

- unincorporated community
- Location within the state of Iowa
- Coordinates: 42°34′29″N 91°54′20″W
- Country: USA
- State: Iowa
- County: Buchanan County

Government
  - Type: unincorporated community
- Elevation: 301 m (988 ft)
- Time zone: UTC-6 (Central (CST))
  - Summer (DST): UTC-5 (CDT)
- GNIS feature ID: 454909

Bryantsburg is an unincorporated community in Buchanan County, Iowa, United States. It is located on Highway 150 north of Independence and south of Hazleton.

== Geography ==
Bryantsburg is located on Iowa State Highway 150, near the junction of 150th Street. It lies about 5 miles (8.0 km) north of the county seat of Independence.

== History ==
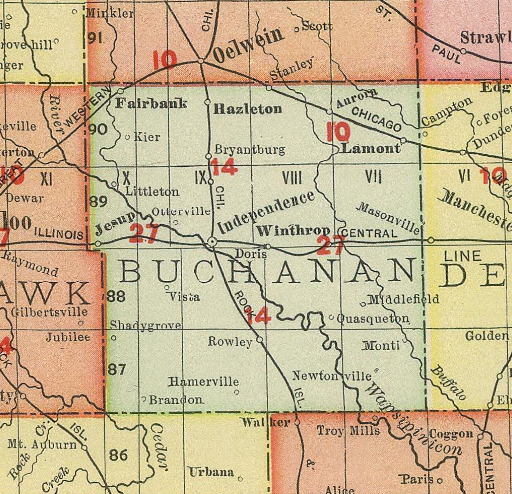
Bryantsburg in north-central Buchanan County, Iowa, in 1903

Founded in the 19th century, the community was originally known as Bryant. Later, the name changed to Bryantburg (no 'S'). Bryantburg was a flag station on the Chicago, Rock Island, and Pacific Railroad; the depot was later upgraded to a full station, and by the early 1900s, Bryantburg was considered a "small town".

Bryantsburg was once home to a bank, schools, and a post office. Early postmasters in Bryantsburg included J. R. Cowell, A. Johnson, C. W. Cowell and J. M. Barclay. The post office was closed by 1925.

Bryantsburg was the site of the Free Will Baptist Church, which originally held meetings in the southwestern part of Hazleton Township until 1900, when the church opened in Bryantsburg. In 1914, the church membership was around 50.

The Chicago, Rock Island, and Pacific Railroad operated until 1980, when it was liquidated.

Bryantsburg's population was 41 in 1902, and 52 in 1925.

In 1931, a major hailstorm in northeast Iowa damaged crops and farm products in the Bryantsburg area, as well as in Swisher, Shueyville, Vinton, Fairfax, and LaPorte City. The path of the storm began in Bryantsburg, and the damage in Buchanan County was extensive, accounted as a near total loss of crops. Poultry and pigs were also killed in the storm, which ranged from one to four miles wide in Buchanan County.

The population was 25 in 1940.

By the 1970s, Bryantsburg was included in a list of "dying towns" in the Waterloo Courier, alongside Kiene, Albany, Buck Grove, Grove Hill, Abbott, Irma, Floyd Crossing, Kains Siding, Dalby, Merson, Jubilee, and Deerfield.

Many Amish families now live in the Bryantsburg area, which is near the Morwood Campgrounds.

== See also ==
- Shady Grove, Iowa
