= Buffalo Township, Buchanan County, Iowa =

Township in Iowa, US

Buffalo Township, Buchanan County
- Township
- Coordinates: 42°35′58″N 091°47′10″W
- Country: United States
- State: Iowa
- County: Buchanan

Area
  - Total: 36.53 sq mi (94.62 km^{2})
  - Land: 36.53 sq mi (94.62 km^{2})
  - Water: 0 sq mi (0 km^{2})
- Elevation: 1,070 ft (326 m)

Population (2000)
  - Total: 560
  - Density: 15/sq mi (5.9/km^{2})
- FIPS code: 19-90384
- GNIS feature ID: 0467501

Buffalo Township is one of sixteen townships in Buchanan County, Iowa, United States. As of the 2000 census, its population was 560. It was established in 1852.

== Geography ==
Buffalo Township covers an area of 36.53 square miles (94.6 km^{2}) and contains two incorporated settlements: Aurora and Stanley. According to the USGS, it contains two cemeteries: Spangler and Stanley.
