= Byron Township, Buchanan County, Iowa =

Township in Iowa, US

Byron Township, Buchanan County
- Township
- Coordinates: 42°30′56″N 091°47′30″W
- Country: United States
- State: Iowa
- County: Buchanan

Area
  - Total: 36.56 sq mi (94.68 km^{2})
  - Land: 36.56 sq mi (94.68 km^{2})
  - Water: 0 sq mi (0 km^{2})
- Elevation: 1,020 ft (311 m)

Population (2000)
  - Total: 1,063
  - Density: 29/sq mi (11.2/km^{2})
- FIPS code: 19-90432
- GNIS feature ID: 0467517

Byron Township is one of sixteen townships in Buchanan County, Iowa, United States. As of the 2000 census, its population was 1,063. Byron Township was organized in 1856.

== Geography ==
Byron Township covers an area of 36.55 square miles (94.7 km^{2}) and contains one incorporated settlement, Winthrop. According to the USGS, it contains three cemeteries: Byron, Fairview and Payne. The former townsite of Doris also lies in the township.
