= Bryantsburg =

Bryantsburg may refer to the following places:

- Bryantsburg, Indiana
- Bryantsburg, Iowa
