= Liberty Township, Buchanan County, Iowa =

Township in Iowa, US

Liberty Township, Buchanan County
- Township
- Coordinates: 42°25′54″N 091°46′30″W
- Country: United States
- State: Iowa
- County: Buchanan

Area
  - Total: 34.28 sq mi (88.79 km^{2})
  - Land: 33.94 sq mi (87.91 km^{2})
  - Water: 0.34 sq mi (0.87 km^{2})
- Elevation: 948 ft (289 m)

Population (2000)
  - Total: 1,133
  - Density: 33/sq mi (12.9/km^{2})
- FIPS code: 19-92439
- GNIS feature ID: 0468212

Liberty Township is one of sixteen townships in Buchanan County, Iowa, United States. As of the 2000 census, its population was 1,133.

== Geography ==
Liberty Township covers an area of 34.28 square miles (88.8 km^{2}) and contains one incorporated settlement, Quasqueton. According to the USGS, it contains four cemeteries: Hickory Grove, Pine Creek, Quasqueton and Saint Patricks.

== History ==
Liberty Township was first organized in 1847 at which time it was much larger than at present. It was reduced to its present size in 1858.
