= Jefferson Township, Buchanan County, Iowa =

Township in Iowa, US

Jefferson Township, Buchanan County
- Township
- Coordinates: 42°20′15″N 092°00′46″W
- Country: United States
- State: Iowa
- County: Buchanan

Area
  - Total: 36.00 sq mi (93.24 km^{2})
  - Land: 35.98 sq mi (93.19 km^{2})
  - Water: 0.019 sq mi (0.05 km^{2})
- Elevation: 920 ft (280 m)

Population (2000)
  - Total: 726
  - Density: 20/sq mi (7.8/km^{2})
- FIPS code: 19-92208
- GNIS feature ID: 0468130

Jefferson Township is one of sixteen townships in Buchanan County, Iowa, United States. As of the 2000 census, its population was 726.

== Geography ==
Jefferson Township covers an area of 36 square miles (93 km^{2}) and contains one incorporated settlement, Brandon. The unincorporated community of Shady Grove is at the northwestern edge of the township. According to the USGS, it contains four cemeteries: Bear Creek School, First, Jefferson Township and Shady Grove (historical).
