= Doris, Iowa =

- Unincorporated community
- Location within the state of Iowa Doris, Iowa (the United States)
- Country: United States
- State: Iowa
- County: Buchanan
- Elevation: 1,014 ft (309 m)
- Time zone: UTC-6 (Central (CST))
  - Summer (DST): UTC-5 (CDT)
- GNIS feature ID: 464154

Doris and Bethel are twin town sites in Buchanan County, Iowa, United States, both located just north of Highway 939 in central Buchanan County near Independence. Founded as whistle-stops along the Chicago and North Western Railway, the sites are abandoned today.

== History ==
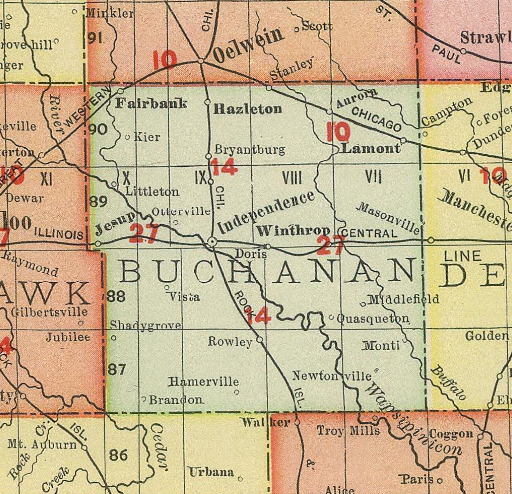
Doris in central Buchanan County, Iowa, in 1903

Galbraith's Rail Map of Iowa from 1897 shows no towns located between Independence and Winthrop. However, by the early 1900s, a number of Iowa newspapers were reporting on events occurring in Doris. A lot sale for plots of land in Doris was held by James Duffy in September 1902; a railroad station and stockyards had recently been completed.

The name Doris honored the daughter of railroad executive M Gillas, from Memphis, Tennessee. Cira 1914, Doris was the site of "an elevator, a store, and a few homes". Doris was also the site of a gravel pit.

In 1917 the Waterloo Times-Tribune reported a story about two men fleeing from the law in Independence; the thieves were apprehended in Doris.

Doris was the site of a freight train collision on September 30, 1922, when a train leaving from Masonville rear-ended another train at the Doris siding. The accident resulted in the death of one conductor and the injury of two others, and the derailment of both trains. Doris' population was listed as 12 in 1925, and 10 in 1940.

Farming activities in Doris were reported as late as 1939, but with increasing infrequency.

Bethel was the site of the Bethel Church of God, located in Section 31 of Byron Township; this church was open from 1855 to 1939. The church also had a cemetery. The church was also used for annual declamatory contests sponsored by the Buchanan County superintendent of schools.

== Geography ==
The town sites were located three-fourths of a mile apart, Doris at the junction of Highway 939 and North Doris Avenue, an unimproved and unpaved gravel road located between Winthrop and Independence. Bethel was less than a mile west, near the intersection of 939 and Nathan Bethel Avenue. Both villages were populated during the early 20th century, but with the advent of rural migration to larger communities, the sites gradually emptied. By the 1990s, Bethel had lost all but a few scattered farmhouses. The town site at Doris is completely abandoned, and all the buildings there have long since been razed to make way for fields. Only a few scattered farms exist in the area.

== See also ==
- Monti, Iowa
