= Middlefield Township =

Middlefield Township may refer to the following townships in the United States:

- Middlefield Township, Geauga County, Ohio
- Middlefield Township, Buchanan County, Iowa
