= East Buchanan Community School District =

Public school district in Winthrop, Iowa, United States

Coordinates: 42.475494°N 91.737353°W

Location
- Winthrop, Iowa Buchanan County United States
- Coordinates: 42.475494, -91.737353

District information
- Type: Local school district
- Grades: K-12
- Superintendent: Kory Kelchen
- Schools: 3
- Budget: $9,343,000 (2020-21)
- NCES District ID: 1910110

Students and staff
- Students: 583 (2022-23)
- Teachers: 45.84 FTE
- Staff: 45.18 FTE
- Student–teacher ratio: 12.72
- Athletic conference: Tri-Rivers
- District mascot: Buccaneers
- Colors: Royal Blue and Red

Other information
- Website: www.eastbuchananschools.com

The East Buchanan Community School District is rural public school district headquartered in Winthrop, Iowa.

The district is completely within Buchanan County, and serves Winthrop, Quasqueton, Aurora, and the surrounding rural areas.

== Schools ==
The district operates three schools, in one facility in Winthrop:

- East Buchanan Elementary School
- East Buchanan Middle School
- East Buchanan High School

=== East Buchanan High School ===
==== Athletics ====
The Buccaneers participate in the Tri-Rivers Conference in the following sports:

- Football (EBHS alum, Robert Gallery is a former NFL player and first round draft pick of the Oakland Raiders.
- Cross Country
- Volleyball
- Basketball
- Wrestling
- Golf
- Track and Field
  - Boys' 2000 Class 1A State Champions
- Baseball
- Softball
- Soccer (as part of teams from Independence)
- Tennis (as part of teams from Independence)

== See also ==
- List of school districts in Iowa
- List of high schools in Iowa
