= Winthrop, Iowa =

- City
- Location of Winthrop, Iowa
- Coordinates: 42°28′05″N 91°44′45″W
- Country: USA
- State: Iowa
- County: Buchanan
- Incorporated: July 7, 1886

Area
  - Total: 0.79 sq mi (2.05 km^{2})
  - Land: 0.79 sq mi (2.05 km^{2})
  - Water: 0 sq mi (0.00 km^{2})
- Elevation: 1,027 ft (313 m)

Population (2020)
  - Total: 823
  - Density: 1,040.7/sq mi (401.83/km^{2})
- Time zone: UTC-6 (Central (CST))
  - Summer (DST): UTC-5 (CDT)
- ZIP code: 50682
- Area code: 319
- FIPS code: 19-86565
- GNIS feature ID: 2397353
- Website: www.cityofwinthrop.com

Winthrop is a city in Buchanan County, Iowa, United States. The population was 823 at the time of the 2020 census.

== History ==
Winthrop was platted in 1857.

== Geography ==
According to the United States Census Bureau, the city has a total area of 0.84 square miles (2.18 km^{2}), all land.

Winthrop is located north of U.S. Route 20.

== Demographics ==
Historical populations
Year	Pop.	±%
1880	320	—
1890	370	+15.6%
1900	618	+67.0%
1910	529	−14.4%
1920	507	−4.2%
1930	496	−2.2%
1940	546	+10.1%
1950	604	+10.6%
1960	649	+7.5%
1970	750	+15.6%
1980	767	+2.3%
1990	742	−3.3%
2000	772	+4.0%
2010	850	+10.1%
2020	823	−3.2%
Source:"U.S. Census website". United States Census Bureau. and Iowa Data Center; Source: U.S. Decennial Census

=== 2020 census ===
As of the census of 2020, there were 823 people, 329 households, and 237 families residing in the city. The population density was 1,040.7 inhabitants per square mile (401.8/km^{2}). There were 344 housing units at an average density of 435.0 per square mile (168.0/km^{2}). The racial makeup of the city was 95.9% White, 0.0% Black or African American, 0.1% Native American, 0.0% Asian, 0.1% Pacific Islander, 0.0% from other races and 3.9% from two or more races. Hispanic or Latino of any race comprised 1.2% of the population.

Of the 329 households, 31.9% of which had children under the age of 18 living with them, 52.9% were married couples living together, 3.0% were cohabitating couples, 27.7% had a female householder with no spouse or partner present and 16.4% had a male householder with no spouse or partner present. 28.0% of all households were non-families. 25.2% of all household were made up of individuals, 10.3% had someone living alone who was 65 years old or older.

The median age in the city was 38.2 years. 30.5% of the residents were under the age of 20; 3.8% were between the ages of 20 and 24; 24.4% were from 25 and 44; 22.4% were from 45 and 64; and 19.0% were 65 years of age or older. The gender makeup of the city was 48.1% male and 51.9% female.

=== 2010 census ===
As of the census of 2010, there were 850 people, 346 households, and 228 families living in the city. The population density was 1,011.9 inhabitants per square mile (390.7/km^{2}). There were 357 housing units at an average density of 425.0 per square mile (164.1/km^{2}). The racial makeup of the city was 98.7% White, 0.1% Native American, 0.2% Asian, 0.1% from other races, and 0.8% from two or more races. Hispanic or Latino of any race were 0.4% of the population.

There were 346 households, of which 31.8% had children under the age of 18 living with them, 52.3% were married couples living together, 9.0% had a female householder with no husband present, 4.6% had a male householder with no wife present, and 34.1% were non-families. 28.9% of all households were made up of individuals, and 14.5% had someone living alone who was 65 years of age or older. The average household size was 2.46 and the average family size was 3.00.

The median age in the city was 38.5 years. 27.5% of residents were under the age of 18; 5.7% were between the ages of 18 and 24; 24.2% were from 25 to 44; 26.7% were from 45 to 64; and 16% were 65 years of age or older. The gender makeup of the city was 50.0% male and 50.0% female.

=== 2000 census ===
As of the census of 2000, there were 772 people, 327 households, and 206 families living in the city. The population density was 1,330.9 inhabitants per square mile (513.9/km^{2}). There were 341 housing units at an average density of 587.9 per square mile (227.0/km^{2}). The racial makeup of the city was 99.09% White, 0.39% Native American, 0.26% from other races, and 0.26% from two or more races. Hispanic or Latino of any race were 0.39% of the population.

There were 327 households, out of which 30.6% had children under the age of 18 living with them, 52.0% were married couples living together, 8.3% had a female householder with no husband present, and 37.0% were non-families. 33.9% of all households were made up of individuals, and 17.7% had someone living alone who was 65 years of age or older. The average household size was 2.35 and the average family size was 3.01.

25.5% were under the age of 18, 8.7% from 18 to 24, 27.5% from 25 to 44, 22.2% from 45 to 64, and 16.2% were 65 years of age or older. The median age was 38 years. For every 100 females, there were 91.1 males. For every 100 females age 18 and over, there were 84.3 males.

The median income for a household in the city was $36,136, and the median income for a family was $42,969. Males had a median income of $31,641 versus $22,500 for females. The per capita income for the city was $19,183. About 4.3% of families and 5.7% of the population were below the poverty line, including 6.3% of those under age 18 and 7.8% of those age 65 or over.

== Education ==
Winthrop is home to the East Buchanan Community School District, which also covers the communities of Quasqueton, Aurora, and Monti. The district operates an interconnected elementary school, middle school, and high school.

== Notable people ==
- Robert S. Doran, math professor
- Robert Gallery, NFL offensive guard
- Michelle Monaghan, actress
- Craig Quigley, US Navy admiral and Assistant Secretary of Defense
- D.J. Thompson Former World Record high score holder for Contra (Arcade)
