= Oelwein Community School District =

Public school district in Oelwein, Iowa, United States

Coordinates: 42.674390°N 91.902287°W

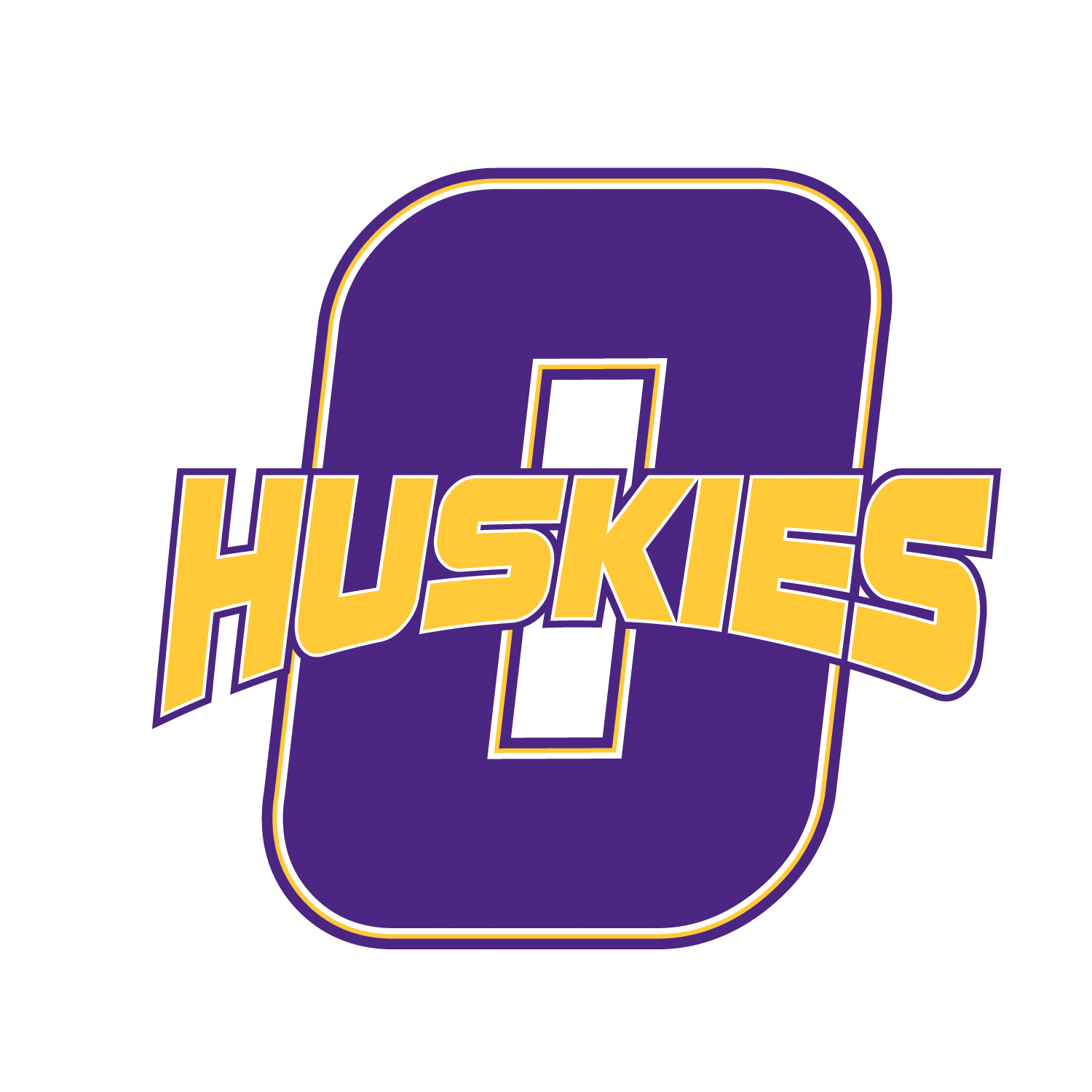

Location
- Oelwein, Iowa Fayette and Buchanan counties United States
- Coordinates: 42.674390, -91.902287

District information
- Type: Local school district
- Grades: K-12
- Superintendent: Josh Ehn
- Schools: 4
- Budget: $21,177,000 (2020-21)
- NCES District ID: 1921630

Students and staff
- Students: 1345 (2022-23)
- Teachers: 96.21 FTE
- Staff: 1114.32 FTE
- Student–teacher ratio: 13.98
- Athletic conference: North Iowa Cedar League
- District mascot: Huskies
- Colors: Purple and Gold

Other information
- Website: www.oelweinschools.com

Oelwein Community School District is a public school district headquartered in Oelwein, Iowa.

Occupying sections of Fayette and Buchanan counties, it includes, aside from Oelwein, Hazleton and Stanley.

As of 2021, it had about 1,000 students.

== History ==
From circa 2001 to 2010, the number of students decreased by 300. Oelwein CSD superintendent Jim Patera stated that this enrollment decline and a 10% decline in money given by the state government put Oelwein CSD in, as paraphrased by Orlan Love of The Gazette of Cedar Rapids, "a serious financial bind".

Oelwein High principal Josh Ehn became the superintendent in 2017.

Enrollment declined by 58 from circa 2015 to 2018. By 2018 the district revised the appearance of the husky mascot and introduced a new logo. That year it also made plans to make the middle school cover 5th grade to make room for 1st grade students at Wings Park Elementary.

== Schools ==
- Oelwein High School (grades 9–12)
- Oelwein Middle School (grades 5–8) - In 2018 several areas changed function, with the turf-floored activity center with a climbing wall installed in the former swimming pool area, and the science laboratories and classrooms being installed in the northwest wing.
- Wings Park Elementary School (grades 1–4) - Circa 1998, it covered preschool through grade 5 and had about 400 students.
- Little Husky Learning Center (kindergarten)

Former schools

- Parkside Elementary - In 1998 it covered until fifth grade and had around 150 students. In 2018 it had 81 students and only covered the 1st grade. That year it closed, with students moved to Wings Park.
- Harlan Elementary – In 1998 it covered until fifth grade and had around 140 students. In 2010 it had 78 students and only covered the 2nd grade. That year, due to enrollment and budget declines, the Oelwein CSD board decided to close the school on a 6-1 basis, with Wings Park taking the 2nd grade. This allowed the district to spend $70,000 fewer annually.
- Oelwein Alternative School – 10th–12th Grade

=== Oelwein High School ===
==== Athletics ====
The Huskies compete in the North Iowa Cedar League in the following sports:

- Cross Country (boys and girls)
- Volleyball
- Football
- Basketball (boys and girls)
- Bowling (boys and girls)
  - Girls' 2010 Class 1A State Champions
- Wrestling
- Track and Field (boys and girls)
- Golf (boys and girls)
  - Boys' 2-time State Champions (1962, 1989)
- Baseball
- Softball
- Tennis (boys and girls)

== See also ==
- List of school districts in Iowa
- List of high schools in Iowa
