= Sumner Township, Buchanan County, Iowa =

Township in Iowa, US

Sumner Township, Buchanan County
- Township
- Coordinates: 42°25′25″N 091°53′40″W
- Country: United States
- State: Iowa
- County: Buchanan

Area
  - Total: 34.31 sq mi (88.85 km^{2})
  - Land: 34.02 sq mi (88.12 km^{2})
  - Water: 0.28 sq mi (0.73 km^{2})
- Elevation: 932 ft (284 m)

Population (2000)
  - Total: 3,148
  - Density: 92/sq mi (35.7/km^{2})
- FIPS code: 19-94047
- GNIS feature ID: 0468765

Sumner Township is one of sixteen townships in Buchanan County, Iowa, USA. As of the 2000 census, its population was 3,148.

== Geography ==
Sumner Township covers an area of 34.31 square miles (88.9 km^{2}) and contains the southern half of the city of Independence. According to the USGS, it contains four cemeteries: Mount Hope, Oakwood, State Hospital and Wilson.
