= Cono Township, Buchanan County, Iowa =

Township in Iowa, US

Cono Township, Buchanan County
- Township
- Coordinates: 42°20′37″N 091°46′31″W
- Country: United States
- State: Iowa
- County: Buchanan

Area
  - Total: 35.97 sq mi (93.17 km^{2})
  - Land: 35.49 sq mi (91.91 km^{2})
  - Water: 0.49 sq mi (1.26 km^{2})
- Elevation: 892 ft (272 m)

Population (2000)
  - Total: 420
  - Density: 12/sq mi (4.6/km^{2})
- FIPS code: 19-90816
- GNIS feature ID: 0467652

Cono Township is one of sixteen townships in Buchanan County, Iowa, United States. As of the 2000 census, its population was 420.

== Geography ==
Cono Township covers an area of 35.97 square miles (93.2 km^{2}) and contains no incorporated settlements.
