= Westburg Township, Buchanan County, Iowa =

Township in Iowa, US

Westburg Township, Buchanan County
- Township
- Coordinates: 42°25′46″N 092°00′45″W
- Country: United States
- State: Iowa
- County: Buchanan

Area
  - Total: 34.03 sq mi (88.13 km^{2})
  - Land: 34.03 sq mi (88.13 km^{2})
  - Water: 0 sq mi (0 km^{2})
- Elevation: 965 ft (294 m)

Population (2010)
  - Total: 513
  - Density: 15.1/sq mi (5.82/km^{2})
- FIPS code: 19-94656
- GNIS feature ID: 0468973

Westburg Township is one of sixteen townships in Buchanan County, Iowa, United States. As of the 2010 census, its population was 513.

== Geography ==
Westburg Township covers an area of 34.03 square miles (88.1 km^{2}) and contains no incorporated settlements.
