= Jesup, Iowa =

- City
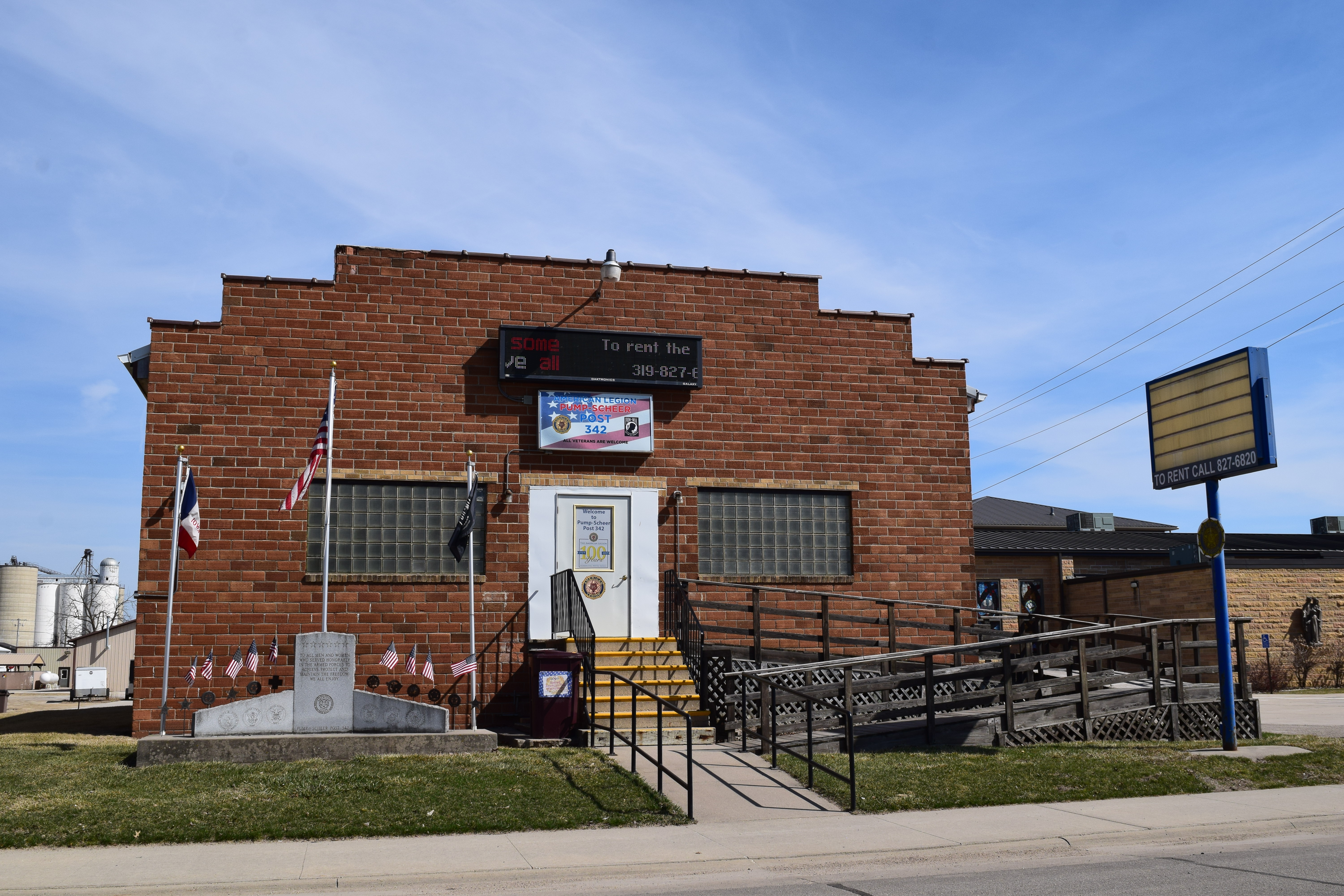
- American Legion post in Jesup
- Motto: "The right place"
- Location of Jesup, Iowa
- Coordinates: 42°28′28″N 92°03′56″W
- Country: United States
- State: Iowa
- Counties: Buchanan, Black Hawk

Government
  - Type: Mayor-council government

Area
  - Total: 1.84 sq mi (4.77 km^{2})
  - Land: 1.84 sq mi (4.77 km^{2})
  - Water: 0 sq mi (0.00 km^{2})
- Elevation: 984 ft (300 m)

Population (2020)
  - Total: 2,508
  - Density: 1,361.9/sq mi (525.85/km^{2})
- Time zone: UTC-6 (Central (CST))
  - Summer (DST): UTC-5 (CDT)
- ZIP code: 50648
- Area code: 319
- FIPS code: 19-39585
- GNIS feature ID: 2395468
- Website: jesupiowa.com

Jesup is a city in Buchanan County and partly in Black Hawk County in the U.S. state of Iowa. The population was 2,508 at the time of the 2020 census. It was named for Morris Ketchum Jesup, president of the Dubuque and Sioux City Railroad.

The Black Hawk County portion of Jesup is part of the Waterloo-Cedar Falls metropolitan area.

The community of Jesup has undergone many changes in recent years. With new subdivisions, the population for the small community is on the rise due to the town's proximity to the Waterloo-Cedar Falls Metropolitan Area.

== Geography ==
According to the United States Census Bureau, the city has a total area of 1.78 square miles (4.61 km^{2}), all land.

The city center is located in Perry Township in Buchanan County.

== Demographics ==
Historical populations
Year	Pop.	±%
1880	569	—
1890	573	+0.7%
1900	690	+20.4%
1910	697	+1.0%
1920	774	+11.0%
1930	736	−4.9%
1940	902	+22.6%
1950	1,158	+28.4%
1960	1,488	+28.5%
1970	1,662	+11.7%
1980	2,343	+41.0%
1990	2,121	−9.5%
2000	2,212	+4.3%
2010	2,520	+13.9%
2020	2,508	−0.5%
Source:"U.S. Census website". United States Census Bureau. and Iowa Data Center; Source: U.S. Decennial Census

=== 2020 census ===
As of the 2020 census, Jesup had a population of 2,508. The population density was 1,367.2 inhabitants per square mile (527.9/km^{2}). The median age was 37.8 years. 26.8% of residents were under the age of 18 and 16.3% of residents were 65 years of age or older. 28.8% of residents were under the age of 20; 4.8% were between the ages of 20 and 24; 26.4% were from 25 to 44; and 23.7% were from 45 to 64. For every 100 females there were 93.4 males, and for every 100 females age 18 and over there were 89.4 males age 18 and over.

0.0% of residents lived in urban areas, while 100.0% lived in rural areas.

There were 1,008 households and 680 families in Jesup. Of those households, 34.6% had children under the age of 18 living in them. Of all households, 55.9% were married-couple households, 6.2% were cohabiting-couple households, 13.3% were households with a male householder and no spouse or partner present, and 24.6% were households with a female householder and no spouse or partner present. About 32.5% of households were non-families, 27.5% of all households were made up of individuals, and 14.6% had someone living alone who was 65 years of age or older.

There were 1,085 housing units at an average density of 591.5 per square mile (228.4/km^{2}), of which 7.1% were vacant. The homeowner vacancy rate was 2.1% and the rental vacancy rate was 6.7%.

Racial composition as of the 2020 census
Race	Number	Percent
White	2,403	95.8%
Black or African American	9	0.4%
American Indian and Alaska Native	3	0.1%
Asian	4	0.2%
Native Hawaiian and Other Pacific Islander	3	0.1%
Some other race	7	0.3%
Two or more races	79	3.1%
Hispanic or Latino (of any race)	41	1.6%

=== 2010 census ===
As of the census of 2010, there were 2,520 people, 982 households, and 719 families living in the city. The population density was 1,415.7 inhabitants per square mile (546.6/km^{2}). There were 1,015 housing units at an average density of 570.2 per square mile (220.2/km^{2}). The racial makeup of the city was 98.2% White, 0.3% African American, 0.2% Asian, and 1.3% from two or more races. Hispanic or Latino of any race were 1.4% of the population.

There were 982 households, of which 38.3% had children under the age of 18 living with them, 56.7% were married couples living together, 9.8% had a female householder with no husband present, 6.7% had a male householder with no wife present, and 26.8% were non-families. 22.1% of all households were made up of individuals, and 11.4% had someone living alone who was 65 years of age or older. The average household size was 2.57 and the average family size was 2.99.

The median age in the city was 35.8 years. 27.7% of residents were under the age of 18; 8.3% were between the ages of 18 and 24; 25% were from 25 to 44; 25.6% were from 45 to 64; and 13.5% were 65 years of age or older. The gender makeup of the city was 47.9% male and 52.1% female.

=== 2000 census ===
As of the census of 2000, there were 2,212 people, 861 households, and 619 families living in the city. The population density was 1,318.6 inhabitants per square mile (509.1/km^{2}). There were 911 housing units at an average density of 543.0 per square mile (209.7/km^{2}). The racial makeup of the city was 99.19% White, 0.18% African American, 0.23% Native American, 0.09% Asian, 0.05% Pacific Islander, 0.05% from other races, and 0.23% from two or more races. Hispanic or Latino of any race were 0.59% of the population.

There were 861 households, out of which 37.3% had children under the age of 18 living with them, 59.1% were married couples living together, 9.2% had a female householder with no husband present, and 28.0% were non-families. 25.1% of all households were made up of individuals, and 15.2% had someone living alone who was 65 years of age or older. The average household size was 2.57 and the average family size was 3.06.

In the city, the population was spread out, with 28.3% under the age of 18, 8.7% from 18 to 24, 26.9% from 25 to 44, 21.1% from 45 to 64, and 15.0% who were 65 years of age or older. The median age was 36 years. For every 100 females, there were 93.0 males. For every 100 females age 18 and over, there were 89.3 males.

The median income for a household in the city was $42,109, and the median income for a family was $48,966. Males had a median income of $32,813 versus $23,424 for females. The per capita income for the city was $17,160. About 3.2% of families and 3.5% of the population were below the poverty line, including 2.4% of those under age 18 and 6.1% of those age 65 or over.

== Education ==
The Jesup Community School District operates a local school that covers grade pre-k through 12th. The district covers a large area of Buchanan and Black Hawk counties. The school district includes the nearby unincorporated communities of Littleton, Wise, and Shady Grove in Buchanan County, and Barclay, Canfield, Jubilee, and Spring Creek in Black Hawk County. Also, the Jesup Community School District has three Amish schools located north of the town serving the large population of rural Amish children. The school's growth in recent years caused the development of plans for a new elementary, early childhood center, and middle school, now completed.

The community is also served by St Athanasius Catholic School offering preschool through eighth grade since the 1950’s.

== Notable people ==
- Charles C. P. Baldwin, US Marshal for Vermont
- Bill Wagner (1894–1951) MLB catcher from 1914–18
- Ying Quartet, 2005 Grammy Award and internationally famous String quartet
