= Jesup Community School District =

Public school district in Jesup, Iowa, United States

Location
- Jesup, Iowa Buchanan and Black Hawk counties United States
- Coordinates: 42.47997°N 92.065°W

District information
- Type: Local school district
- Grades: K-12
- Superintendent: Mary Jo Hainstock (Interim Jan.-July 2022), Chad Kohagen (Begin July 2022)
- Schools: 6
- Budget: $13,636,000 (2020-21)
- NCES District ID: 1915330

Students and staff
- Students: 1069 (2022-23)
- Teachers: 70.07 FTE
- Staff: 85.52 FTE
- Student–teacher ratio: 15.26
- Athletic conference: North Iowa Cedar League
- District mascot: J-Hawk
- Colors: Blue and Orange

Other information
- Website: www.jesup.k12.ia.us

Jesup Community School District is a public school district headquartered in Jesup, Iowa. It operates a single K-12 campus in the northern part of the city with separate divisions for elementary, middle, and high school. As of 2020 it has around 1,000 students. The district occupies portions of Buchanan and Black Hawk counties.

The district has three K-8 schools outside of Jesup for Amish students. A total of 120 students, as of 2020, attend these campuses.

The school's mascot is the J-Hawk, and their colors are blue and orange.

== History ==
In 2009, the district had about 910 students. Sarah Pinion served as superintendent until 2009; she left to become the superintendent of the Marion Independent School District. In 2009, Nathan Marting, previously superintendent of the Midland Community School District, became Jesup's superintendent. Chad Kohagen is the superintendent of the Jesup Community School District.

== Schools ==
- Jesup Elementary School
- Perry #1 Elementary School
- Prairie Grove Elementary School
- Triumph Elementary School
- Jesup Middle School
- Jesup High School

=== Jesup High School ===
==== Athletics ====
The J-Hawks compete in the North Iowa Cedar League Conference in the following sports:

- Cross Country (boys and girls)
  - Boys' State Champions - 1990
- Volleyball (girls)
- Football (boys)
- Basketball (boys and girls)
- Wrestling (boys and girls)
- Track and Field (boys and girls)
- Golf (boys and girls)
- Baseball (boys)
- Softball (girls)
- Soccer (boys and girls)
- Tennis (boys and girls)

== See also ==
- List of school districts in Iowa
- List of high schools in Iowa
