= Bill Wagner (baseball) =

American baseball player (1894–1951)

- Catcher
- Born: January 2, 1894; Jesup, Iowa, U.S.
- Died: January 11, 1951 (aged 57); Waterloo, Iowa, U.S.
- Batted: Right Threw: Right

MLB debut
- July 16, 1914, for the Pittsburgh Pirates

Last MLB appearance
- September 2, 1918, for the Boston Braves

MLB statistics
- Batting average: .207
- Home runs: 1
- Runs batted in: 18
- Stats at Baseball Reference

Teams
- Pittsburgh Pirates (1914–1917); Boston Braves (1918)

William Joseph Wagner (January 2, 1894 – January 11, 1951) was an American baseball catcher. He was born in 1894 in Jesup, Iowa. Wagner played parts of five seasons in Major League Baseball and was a member of the Pittsburgh Pirates from 1914 to 1917 and the Boston Braves in 1918. He played in 93 career games, with 50 hits and 1 home run and a batting average of .207. Wagner died in 1951 in Waterloo, Iowa.

Over a decade after Bill Wagner's death, a controversy arose whether he had pinch hit for teammate Honus Wagner in 1917, which would thereby have made him the only player to have done so. Later examination of National League archives proved the allegation incorrect.
