= Buchanan County, Iowa =

County in Iowa, United States

- County
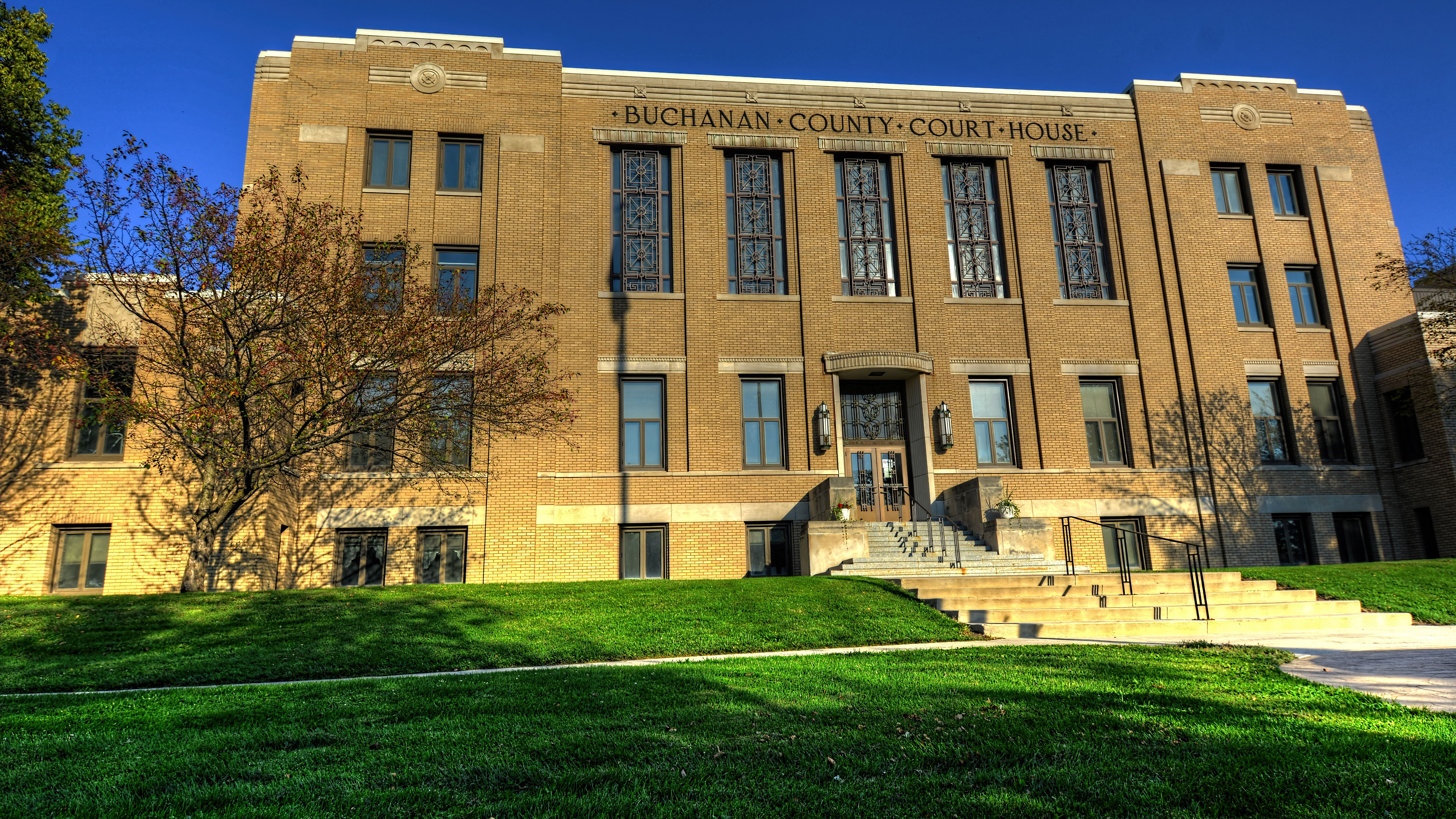
- Buchanan County Courthouse

- Location within the U.S. state of Iowa
- Coordinates: 42°28′19″N 91°50′21″W
- Country: United States
- State: Iowa
- Founded: 1837
- Named for: James Buchanan
- Seat: Independence
- Largest city: Independence

Area
  - Total: 573 sq mi (1,480 km^{2})
  - Land: 571 sq mi (1,480 km^{2})
  - Water: 2.1 sq mi (5.4 km^{2}) 0.4%

Population (2020)
  - Total: 20,565
  - Estimate (2025): 20,883 ▲
  - Density: 36.6/sq mi (14.1/km^{2})
- Time zone: UTC−6 (Central)
  - Summer (DST): UTC−5 (CDT)
- Congressional district: 1st
- Website: www.buchanancounty.iowa.gov
- Iowa county number 10

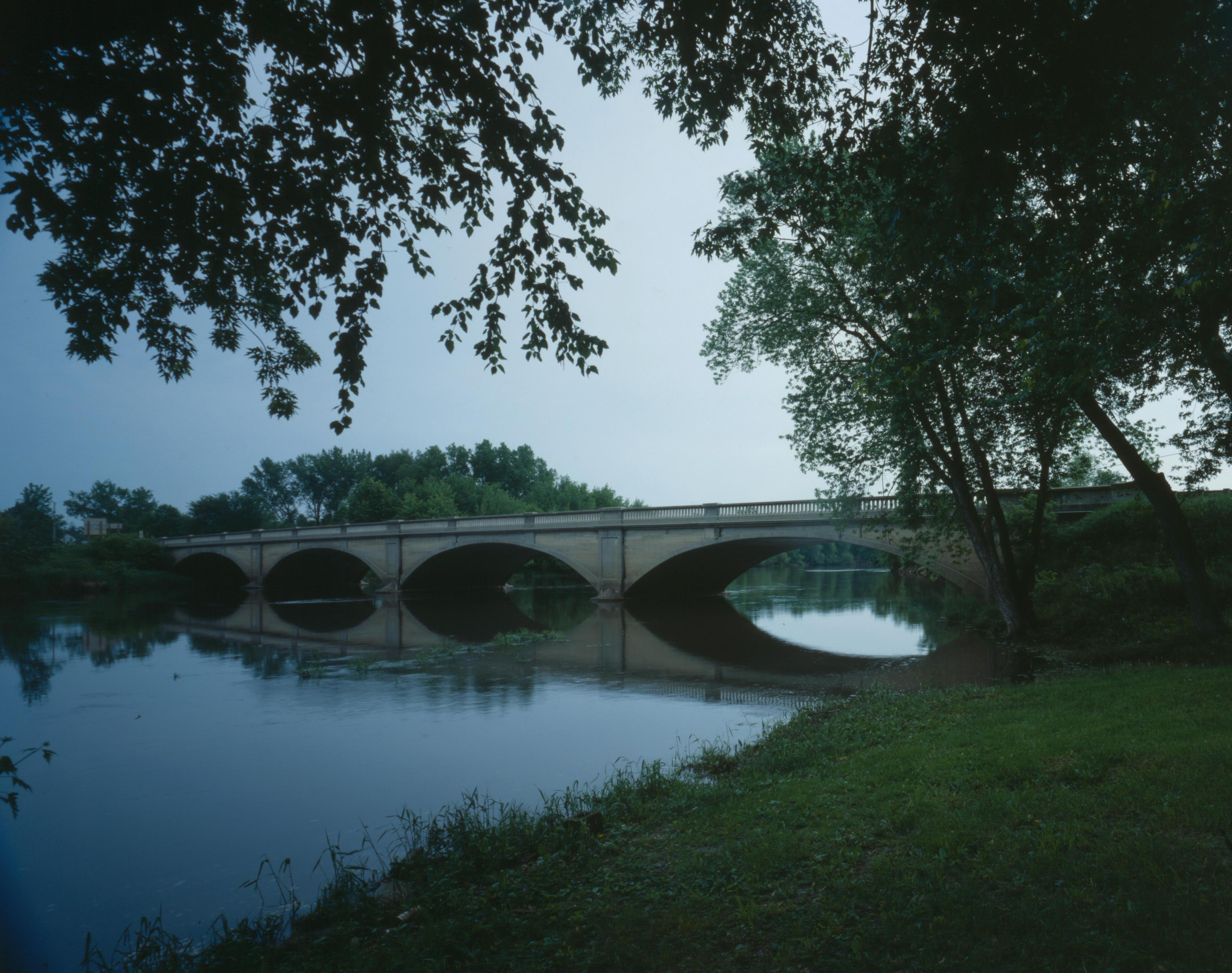
Wapsipinicon River Bridge

Buchanan County is a county located in the U.S. state of Iowa. As of the 2020 census, the population was 20,565. Its county seat is Independence. The county was created in 1837 and was named in honor of Senator James Buchanan, the 15th President of the United States.

== History ==
Buchanan County was formed on December 21, 1837, from parts of Dubuque County. It was named after US Senator James Buchanan, who would later go on to be President of the United States.

== Geography ==
According to the U.S. Census Bureau, the county has a total area of 573 square miles (1,480 km^{2}), of which 571 square miles (1,480 km^{2}) is land and 2.1 square miles (5.4 km^{2}) (0.4%) is water.

=== Major highways ===
- Interstate 380
- U.S. Highway 20
- Iowa Highway 27
- Iowa Highway 150
- Iowa Highway 187
- Iowa Highway 281

=== Adjacent counties ===
- Clayton County (northeast)
- Fayette County (north)
- Delaware County (east)
- Linn County (southeast)
- Benton County (southwest)
- Black Hawk County (west)
- Bremer County (northwest)

== Demographics ==
Historical population
Census	Pop.	Note	%±
1850	517		—
1860	7,906		1,429.2%
1870	17,034		115.5%
1880	18,546		8.9%
1890	18,997		2.4%
1900	21,427		12.8%
1910	19,748		−7.8%
1920	19,890		0.7%
1930	19,550		−1.7%
1940	20,991		7.4%
1950	21,927		4.5%
1960	22,293		1.7%
1970	21,746		−2.5%
1980	22,900		5.3%
1990	20,844		−9.0%
2000	21,093		1.2%
2010	20,958		−0.6%
2020	20,565		−1.9%
2025 (est.)	20,883	▲	1.5%

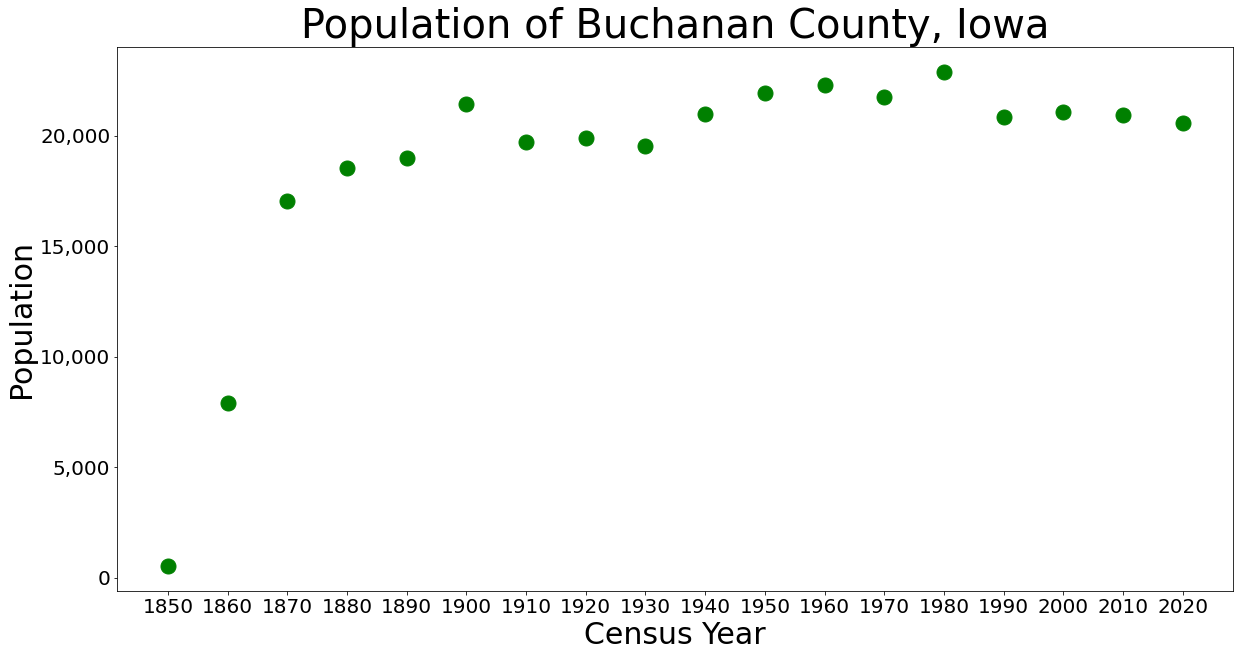
Population of Buchanan County from US census data

=== 2020 census ===
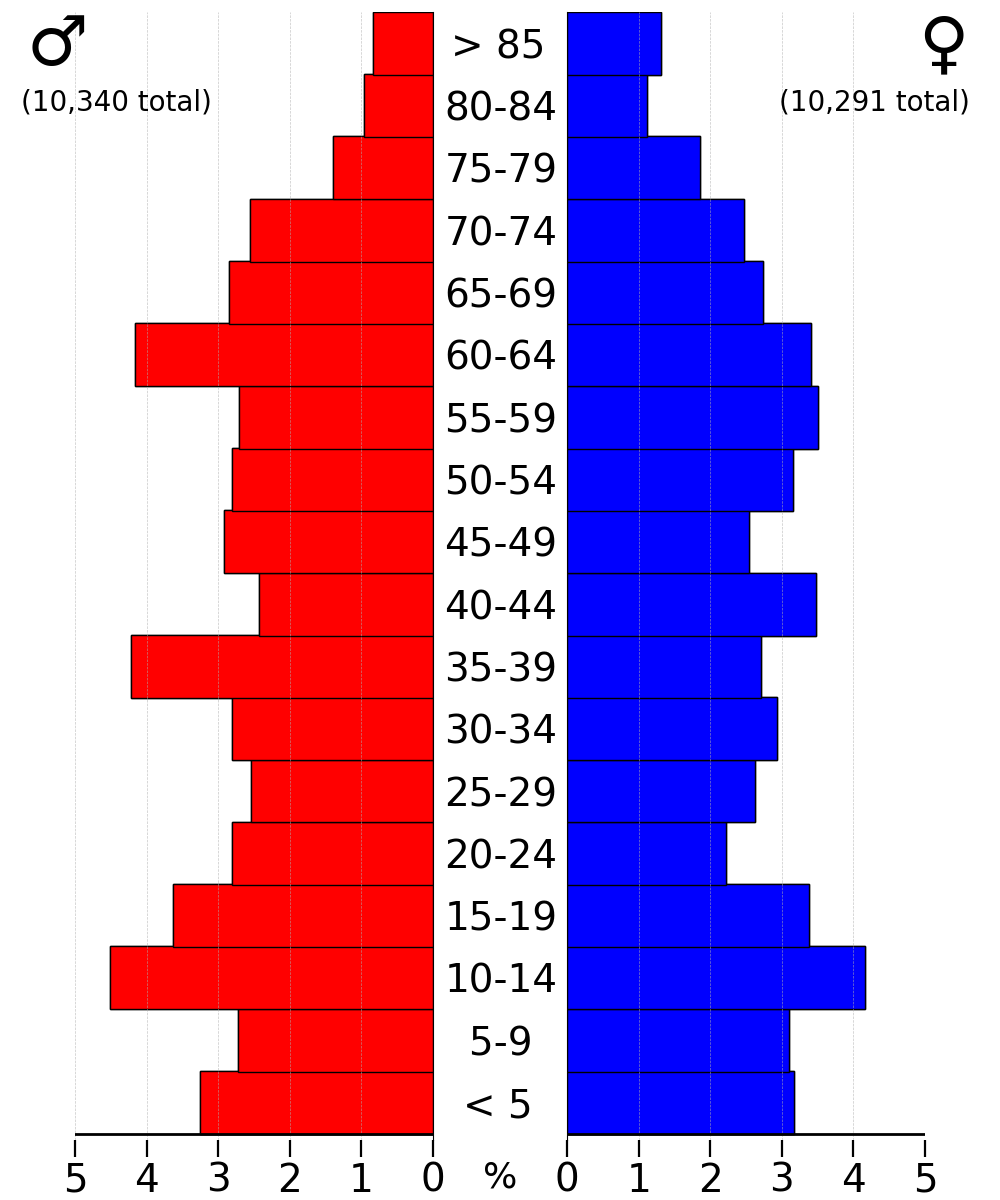
2022 US Census population pyramid for Buchanan County from ACS 5-year estimates

As of the 2020 census, the county had a population of 20,565 and a population density of 36.0/sq mi (13.9/km^{2}); 97.06% of residents reported being of one race.

The median age was 39.8 years. 26.3% of residents were under the age of 18 and 18.8% of residents were 65 years of age or older. For every 100 females there were 98.8 males, and for every 100 females age 18 and over there were 96.7 males age 18 and over.

32.9% of residents lived in urban areas, while 67.1% lived in rural areas.

There were 8,198 households in the county, of which 30.1% had children under the age of 18 living in them. Of all households, 54.3% were married-couple households, 17.0% were households with a male householder and no spouse or partner present, and 22.1% were households with a female householder and no spouse or partner present. About 28.0% of all households were made up of individuals and 13.9% had someone living alone who was 65 years of age or older.

There were 8,886 housing units, of which 7.7% were vacant, leaving 8,198 occupied units. Among occupied housing units, 80.0% were owner-occupied and 20.0% were renter-occupied. The homeowner vacancy rate was 1.6% and the rental vacancy rate was 8.1%.

The racial makeup of the county was 95.8% White, 0.4% Black or African American, 0.1% American Indian and Alaska Native, 0.3% Asian, 0.1% Native Hawaiian and Pacific Islander, 0.5% from some other race, and 2.9% from two or more races. Hispanic or Latino residents of any race comprised 1.6% of the population.

=== 2010 census ===
The 2010 census recorded a population of 20,958 in the county, with a population density of 36.7/sq mi (14.2/km^{2}). There were 8,968 housing units, of which 8,161 were occupied.

=== 2000 census ===
As of the census of 2000, there were 21,093 people, 7,933 households, and 5,672 families residing in the county. The population density was 37 people per square mile (14 people/km^{2}). There were 8,697 housing units at an average density of 15 units per square mile (5.8 units/km^{2}). The racial makeup of the county was 98.41% White, 0.27% Black or African American, 0.21% Native American, 0.40% Asian, 0.16% from other races, and 0.54% from two or more races. 0.62% of the population were Hispanic or Latino of any race.

There were 7,933 households, out of which 34.50% had children under the age of 18 living with them, 60.70% were married couples living together, 7.40% had a female householder with no husband present, and 28.50% were non-families. 24.70% of all households were made up of individuals, and 12.50% had someone living alone who was 65 years of age or older. The average household size was 2.61 and the average family size was 3.13.

In the county, the population was spread out, with 28.60% under the age of 18, 8.10% from 18 to 24, 26.30% from 25 to 44, 22.50% from 45 to 64, and 14.50% who were 65 years of age or older. The median age was 36 years. For every 100 females there were 98.70 males. For every 100 females age 18 and over, there were 94.40 males.

The median income for a household in the county was $38,036, and the median income for a family was $45,421. Males had a median income of $30,212 versus $22,356 for females. The per capita income for the county was $18,405. About 6.80% of families and 9.40% of the population were below the poverty line, including 12.90% of those under age 18 and 7.60% of those age 65 or over.

== Communities ==
=== Cities ===
- Aurora
- Brandon
- Fairbank
- Hazleton
- Independence
- Jesup
- Lamont
- Quasqueton
- Rowley
- Stanley
- Winthrop

=== Unincorporated communities ===
- Bethel
- Bryantsburg
- Castleville
- Chatham
- Doris
- Gatesville
- Hamerville
- Kiene
- Kier
- Littleton
- Middlefield
- Monti
- Newtonville
- Otterville
- Shady Grove
- Vista
- Wise

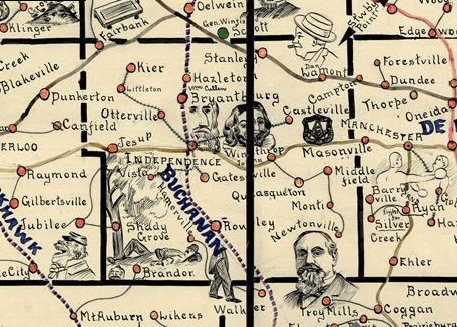
This detail of Galbraith's 1897 Rail Service Map of Iowa shows Buchanan County towns of the time. It is a pictorial map rather than a technical map: Shady Grove, for example, is shown next to a man lying under a tree; Masonville is shown next to a Masonic symbol. Some of the towns' locations are slightly altered to make room for the illustrations. Several of these towns, including Hamerville, Vista, Kier, Middlefield, Newtonville, and Castleville no longer exist. A few are nearly ghost towns.

A number of historic communities in Buchanan County once appeared on state maps, but no longer exist. Hamerville was located east of Brandon at the intersection of Highway 150. Today, the site is the location of three farmhouses. Vista, once located between Brandon and Independence, appeared on maps frequently until the 1950s. This site is not even accessed by paved road. Kier, between Fairbank and Littleton, appeared on many maps in the 19th century and early 20th century. The area is now settled by Amish. Several towns named Middlefield existed southeast of Winthrop, but none are populated today. Newtonville was located a few miles south of Monti. The houses at Castleville were later moved to Aurora. Wise, once located between Independence and Jesup just north of Highway 939, was a train-stop between the 1920s and the 1950s. Little remains at the site. Kiene was founded in 1911 between Quasqueton and Monti, but was empty by 1955. Bethel was located three-fourths of a mile apart from Doris, it contained a church as well as a small cemetery, the town was subsequently abandoned by the 1990s. Few or even no houses remain at any of these sites.

=== Townships ===
Buchanan County is divided into sixteen townships:

- Buffalo
- Byron
- Cono
- Fairbank
- Fremont
- Hazleton
- Homer
- Jefferson
- Liberty
- Madison
- Middlefield
- Newton
- Perry
- Sumner
- Washington
- Westburg

=== Population ranking ===
The population ranking of the following table is based on the 2020 census of Buchanan County.

† county seat

Rank	City/Town/etc.	Municipal type	Population (2020 Census)	Population (2024 Estimate)
1	† Independence	City	6,064	6,279
2	Jesup (partially in Black Hawk County)	City	2,508	2,534
3	Fairbank (partially in Fayette County)	City	1,111	1,133
4	Winthrop	City	823	847
5	Hazleton	City	713	701
6	Quasqueton	City	570	596
7	Lamont	City	429	422
8	Brandon	City	341	366
9	Rowley	City	270	275
10	Aurora	City	169	172
11	Stanley (partially in Fayette County)	City	81	77

== Education ==
School districts in the county include:

- East Buchanan Community School District
- Independence Community School District
- Jesup Community School District
- North Linn Community School District
- Oelwein Community School District
- Starmont Community School District
- Union Community School District
- Vinton-Shellsburg Community School District
- Wapsie Valley Community School District
- West Delaware County Community School District

In the period prior to July 1966 the county had two school districts, serving Amish groups, which did not operate high schools. The Iowa legislature had passed a law requiring school districts which did not operate school districts to merge into ones that did.

== Amish community ==
Buchanan County is home to the Hazleton Old Order Amish settlement, founded in 1914, that in 1987 had to six church districts (congregations) with an estimated population of about 1,200 Amish. The Buchanan Amish affiliation is named after Buchanan County.

== Politics ==
From the founding of the Republican Party in 1854 through 1984, the party won nearly every presidential election in Buchanan County. The exceptions were 1864, 1912 (when former Republican Theodore Roosevelt ran as a Progressive, allowing Democrat Woodrow Wilson to win the county with a sub-40% plurality), the two landslide elections of Franklin D. Roosevelt in 1932 and 1936, and the landslide election of Lyndon B. Johnson in 1964. The county took a leftward shift beginning in 1988, voting for the Democratic nominee in every election from then until 2012 and by a margin of at least 10% in each election in that span except for 1992 and 2004. In 2016, Donald Trump swung the county back to the right, shifting the county 29% to the right from 2012, as Trump won the county by a margin of over 15%. Trump improved on this performance in 2020, taking nearly 60% of the county's vote and winning by a margin of almost 21%, the best vote share for any candidate in the county since 1964. Trump did even better in 2024, winning more than 63% of Buchanan County's vote and achieving a margin of victory of more than 28%, the best Republican performance in the county since Dwight D. Eisenhower in his 1952 landslide.

United States presidential election results for Buchanan County, Iowa
Year	Republican		Democratic		Third party(ies)	
Year	No.	%	No.	%	No.	%
1896	2,865	55.30%	2,233	43.10%	83	1.60%
1900	2,958	56.95%	2,053	39.53%	183	3.52%
1904	2,798	60.93%	1,545	33.65%	249	5.42%
1908	2,552	55.76%	1,889	41.27%	136	2.97%
1912	1,271	26.93%	1,866	39.54%	1,582	33.52%
1916	3,000	61.79%	1,808	37.24%	47	0.97%
1920	6,334	79.20%	1,600	20.01%	63	0.79%
1924	5,459	63.10%	1,780	20.58%	1,412	16.32%
1928	5,885	65.36%	3,099	34.42%	20	0.22%
1932	4,401	46.33%	5,004	52.67%	95	1.00%
1936	4,734	47.85%	5,025	50.79%	135	1.36%
1940	5,630	54.61%	4,649	45.10%	30	0.29%
1944	4,653	54.69%	3,841	45.15%	14	0.16%
1948	4,310	50.57%	4,127	48.42%	86	1.01%
1952	6,431	67.81%	3,019	31.83%	34	0.36%
1956	5,512	61.01%	3,513	38.88%	10	0.11%
1960	5,179	54.90%	4,251	45.07%	3	0.03%
1964	3,187	36.12%	5,621	63.71%	15	0.17%
1968	4,541	52.35%	3,670	42.31%	463	5.34%
1972	5,277	58.32%	3,609	39.89%	162	1.79%
1976	4,794	51.98%	4,258	46.17%	171	1.85%
1980	5,041	53.50%	3,605	38.26%	776	8.24%
1984	4,965	54.25%	4,129	45.12%	58	0.63%
1988	3,495	42.00%	4,778	57.42%	48	0.58%
1992	3,313	34.32%	4,166	43.15%	2,175	22.53%
1996	3,043	34.00%	4,997	55.83%	911	10.18%
2000	4,092	43.49%	5,045	53.61%	273	2.90%
2004	4,797	45.79%	5,608	53.54%	70	0.67%
2008	4,139	40.02%	6,050	58.50%	153	1.48%
2012	4,450	42.24%	5,911	56.11%	174	1.65%
2016	5,510	53.75%	3,970	38.72%	772	7.53%
2020	6,420	59.59%	4,169	38.70%	185	1.72%
2024	6,790	63.16%	3,766	35.03%	194	1.80%

== See also ==
- National Register of Historic Places listings in Buchanan County, Iowa
