= Stanley, Iowa =

- City
- Location of Stanley, Iowa
- Coordinates: 42°38′31″N 91°48′44″W
- Country: United States
- State: Iowa
- Counties: Buchanan, Fayette
- Incorporated: March 23, 1914

Area
  - Total: 0.20 sq mi (0.53 km^{2})
  - Land: 0.20 sq mi (0.53 km^{2})
  - Water: 0 sq mi (0.00 km^{2})
- Elevation: 1,112 ft (339 m)

Population (2020)
  - Total: 81
  - Density: 398.8/sq mi (153.97/km^{2})
- Time zone: UTC-6 (Central (CST))
  - Summer (DST): UTC-5 (CDT)
- ZIP code: 50671
- Area code: 319
- FIPS code: 19-74955
- GNIS feature ID: 2395951

Stanley is a city in Buchanan and Fayette counties in the U.S. state of Iowa. The population was 81 at the time of the 2020 census. A post office opened in Stanley in 1887.

== Geography ==
According to the United States Census Bureau, the city has a total area of 0.24 square miles (0.62 km^{2}), all land.

== Demographics ==
Historical populations
Year	Pop.	±%
1920	163	—
1930	138	−15.3%
1940	185	+34.1%
1950	158	−14.6%
1960	156	−1.3%
1970	151	−3.2%
1980	154	+2.0%
1990	116	−24.7%
2000	128	+10.3%
2010	125	−2.3%
2020	81	−35.2%
Source:"American FactFinder". United States Census Bureau. and Iowa Data Center; Source: U.S. Decennial Census

=== 2020 census ===
As of the census of 2020, there were 81 people, 35 households, and 30 families residing in the city. The population density was 398.8 inhabitants per square mile (154.0/km^{2}). There were 41 housing units at an average density of 201.9 per square mile (77.9/km^{2}). The racial makeup of the city was 92.6% White, 0.0% Black or African American, 0.0% Native American, 0.0% Asian, 0.0% Pacific Islander, 0.0% from other races and 7.4% from two or more races. Hispanic or Latino persons of any race comprised 3.7% of the population.

Of the 35 households, 34.3% of which had children under the age of 18 living with them, 51.4% were married couples living together, 5.7% were cohabitating couples, 31.4% had a female householder with no spouse or partner present and 11.4% had a male householder with no spouse or partner present. 14.3% of all households were non-families. 11.4% of all households were made up of individuals, 5.7% had someone living alone who was 65 years old or older.

The median age in the city was 50.8 years. 17.3% of the residents were under the age of 20; 2.5% were between the ages of 20 and 24; 22.2% were from 25 and 44; 34.6% were from 45 and 64; and 23.5% were 65 years of age or older. The gender makeup of the city was 49.4% male and 50.6% female.

=== 2010 census ===
As of the census of 2010, there were 125 people, 43 households, and 34 families living in the city. The population density was 520.8 inhabitants per square mile (201.1/km^{2}). There were 49 housing units at an average density of 204.2 per square mile (78.8/km^{2}). The racial makeup of the city was 90.4% White, 0.8% African American, 1.6% Native American, and 7.2% from two or more races. Hispanic or Latino of any race were 1.6% of the population.

There were 43 households, of which 39.5% had children under the age of 18 living with them, 60.5% were married couples living together, 9.3% had a female householder with no husband present, 9.3% had a male householder with no wife present, and 20.9% were non-families. 16.3% of all households were made up of individuals, and 9.3% had someone living alone who was 65 years of age or older. The average household size was 2.91 and the average family size was 3.29.

The median age in the city was 34.3 years. 34.4% of residents were under the age of 18; 8% were between the ages of 18 and 24; 20.8% were from 25 to 44; 20% were from 45 to 64; and 16.8% were 65 years of age or older. The gender makeup of the city was 46.4% male and 53.6% female.

=== 2000 census ===
As of the census of 2000, there were 128 people, 42 households, and 34 families living in the city. The population density was 532.5 inhabitants per square mile (205.6/km^{2}). There were 50 housing units at an average density of 208.0 per square mile (80.3/km^{2}). The racial makeup of the city was 96.09% White, and 3.91% from two or more races.

There were 42 households, out of which 47.6% had children under the age of 18 living with them, 73.8% were married couples living together, 4.8% had a female householder with no husband present, and 19.0% were non-families. 16.7% of all households were made up of individuals, and 11.9% had someone living alone who was 65 years of age or older. The average household size was 3.05 and the average family size was 3.41.

In the city, the population was spread out, with 38.3% under the age of 18, 2.3% from 18 to 24, 28.9% from 25 to 44, 20.3% from 45 to 64, and 10.2% who were 65 years of age or older. The median age was 34 years. For every 100 females, there were 82.9 males. For every 100 females age 18 and over, there were 97.5 males.

The median income for a household in the city was $30,313, and the median income for a family was $31,563. Males had a median income of $27,917 versus $11,375 for females. The per capita income for the city was $9,631. There were 17.1% of families and 22.4% of the population living below the poverty line, including 35.2% of under eighteens and none of those over 64.

== Education ==
It is within the Oelwein Community School District.
