= Shady Grove, Iowa =

- Unincorporated community
- Location within the state of Iowa Shady Grove, Iowa (the United States)
- Coordinates: 42°22′50″N 92°03′18″W
- Country: United States
- State: Iowa
- County: Buchanan
- Founded: 1857
- Elevation: 925 ft (282 m)
- Time zone: UTC-6 (Central (CST))
  - Summer (DST): UTC-5 (CDT)
- GNIS feature ID: 464738

Shady Grove is a former townsite and unincorporated community in Buchanan County, Iowa, United States, between the cities of Brandon and Jesup. Settlement of Shady Grove began in 1857, but with the advent of rural migration, the population had dropped to 25 by the 1950s. New housing developments begun during the 1990s and 2000s, however, have caused the empty community to be reborn, causing controversy along the way.

== Geography ==
Shady Grove lies at the junction of county roads V65 and D47 between Brandon and Jesup. It lies 1/2 mile east of the Black Hawk county line. Other nearby towns include Jubilee and La Porte City in Black Hawk County and Mount Auburn in Benton County.

== History ==
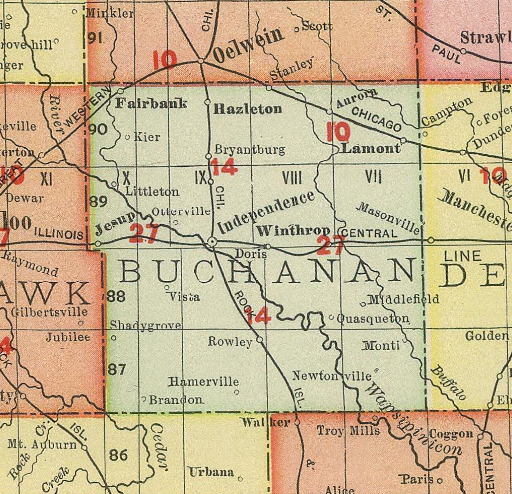
Shady Grove in west-central Buchanan County, Iowa, in 1903

Shady Grove was founded in 1857 at the western edge of Jefferson Township, near the Buchanan-Black Hawk county line. Shady Grove was close to another community named Sunnyside. In 1886, a post office opened under the name Shady Grove. Despite attracting businesses including a machinery dealership, a creamery, a church and a general store, the town was never incorporated. Years of rural migration caused the population to drop to 12 residents in 1902, and 29 residents in 1925.

The population was 20 in 1940, and was 25 residents (seven families) by 1958. The general store closed in the 1980s and the building was moved from its original spot to one on Spring Creek Road. The town remained on county maps as late as the 1990s, though there was nothing left to mark the community other than a giant machine shed with the words "Shady Grove" on it.

There is still evidence of Shady Grove's existence. Property owned by the Schares contained the building which once was a barber shop. They knocked it down in 2004 to make room for their cattle field. At the time of its destruction, newspapers lined the walls like wallpaper. Cattle land owned by the Youngbluts was discovered to hold the old Shady Grove Cemetery. The tombstones have tumbled and been broken up and some possibly lost due to flooded creeks and cattle tromps. The Buchanan County Historical Society has taken the cemetery area under their wing and turned it into a protected area with a sign outside the fence recognizing its existence.

During the mid-1990s, there was renewed interest in the area as developers began selling plots of land. By 2007, more than forty new homes had been built in the area, causing concern for the area's local farmers.
