= Middlefield Township, Buchanan County, Iowa =

Township in Iowa, US

Middlefield Township, Buchanan County
- Township
- Coordinates: 42°25′35″N 091°39′11″W
- Country: United States
- State: Iowa
- County: Buchanan

Area
  - Total: 34.97 sq mi (90.56 km^{2})
  - Land: 34.97 sq mi (90.56 km^{2})
  - Water: 0 sq mi (0 km^{2})
- Elevation: 991 ft (302 m)

Population (2000)
  - Total: 304
  - Density: 8.8/sq mi (3.4/km^{2})
- FIPS code: 19-92919
- GNIS feature ID: 0468376

Middlefield Township is one of sixteen townships in Buchanan County, Iowa, United States. As of the 2000 census, its population was 304. Middlefield Township was established in 1858.

== Geography ==
Middlefield Township covers an area of 34.97 square miles (90.6 km^{2}) and contains no incorporated settlements.
