= Hazleton, Iowa =

- City
- Location of Hazleton, Iowa
- Coordinates: 42°37′04″N 91°54′21″W
- Country: US
- State: Iowa
- County: Buchanan

Area
  - Total: 0.84 sq mi (2.17 km^{2})
  - Land: 0.80 sq mi (2.07 km^{2})
  - Water: 0.039 sq mi (0.10 km^{2})
- Elevation: 997 ft (304 m)

Population (2020)
  - Total: 713
  - Density: 892.0/sq mi (344.42/km^{2})
- Time zone: UTC-6 (Central (CST))
  - Summer (DST): UTC-5 (CDT)
- ZIP code: 50641
- Area code: 319
- FIPS code: 19-35580
- GNIS feature ID: 2394342
- Website: hazletonia.com

Hazleton is a city in Buchanan County, Iowa, United States. The population was 713 at the time of the 2020 census.

== History ==
The original town was established in 1853 when E. W. Tenney opened a store. A post office opened soon after and was named "Hazelton", because the community was in a hazelnut grove. When the railway came, it missed the town by a mile, so the town was moved to the railway. The current site of "Hazleton" was established in 1873, and incorporated in 1883.

== Geography ==
According to the United States Census Bureau, the city has a total area of 0.79 square miles (2.05 km^{2}), of which 0.75 square miles (1.94 km^{2}) is land and 0.04 square miles (0.10 km^{2}) is water.

== Demographics ==
Historical populations
Year	Pop.	±%
1880	210	—
1890	287	+36.7%
1900	500	+74.2%
1910	444	−11.2%
1920	517	+16.4%
1930	499	−3.5%
1940	536	+7.4%
1950	550	+2.6%
1960	665	+20.9%
1970	626	−5.9%
1980	877	+40.1%
1990	733	−16.4%
2000	950	+29.6%
2010	823	−13.4%
2020	713	−13.4%
Source:"American FactFinder". United States Census Bureau. and Iowa Data Center; Source: US Decennial Census

=== 2020 census ===
As of the census of 2020, there were 713 people, 311 households, and 174 families residing in the city. The population density was 892.0 inhabitants per square mile (344.4/km^{2}). There were 357 housing units at an average density of 446.6 per square mile (172.5/km^{2}). The racial makeup of the city was 93.4% White, 0.6% Black or African American, 0.1% Native American, 0.0% Asian, 0.0% Pacific Islander, 1.0% from other races and 4.9% from two or more races. Hispanic or Latino persons of any race comprised 2.9% of the population.

Of the 311 households, 23.5% of which had children under the age of 18 living with them, 38.3% were married couples living together, 13.2% were cohabitating couples, 24.1% had a female householder with no spouse or partner present and 24.4% had a male householder with no spouse or partner present. 44.1% of all households were non-families. 35.4% of all households were made up of individuals, 16.1% had someone living alone who was 65 years old or older.

The median age in the city was 41.3 years. 24.4% of the residents were under the age of 20; 5.9% were between the ages of 20 and 24; 24.0% were from 25 and 44; 25.8% were from 45 and 64; and 19.9% were 65 years of age or older. The gender makeup of the city was 50.9% male and 49.1% female.

=== 2010 census ===
As of the census of 2010, there were 823 people, 354 households, and 207 families living in the city. The population density was 1,097.3 inhabitants per square mile (423.7/km^{2}). There were 402 housing units at an average density of 536.0 per square mile (207.0/km^{2}). The racial makeup of the city was 96.8% White, 0.5% African American, 1.6% Native American, and 1.1% from two or more races. Hispanic or Latino of any race were 1.6% of the population.

There were 354 households, of which 28.5% had children under the age of 18 living with them, 42.1% were married couples living together, 10.5% had a female householder with no husband present, 5.9% had a male householder with no wife present, and 41.5% were non-families. 35.3% of all households were made up of individuals, and 11.3% had someone living alone who was 65 years of age or older. The average household size was 2.32 and the average family size was 3.00.

The median age in the city was 40.7 years. 24.5% of residents were under the age of 18; 8.3% were between the ages of 18 and 24; 24.4% were from 25 to 44; 29.2% were from 45 to 64; and 13.5% were 65 years of age or older. The gender makeup of the city was 53.9% male and 46.1% female.

=== 2000 census ===
As of the census of 2000, there were 950 people, 381 households, and 252 families living in the city. The population density was 1,276.4 inhabitants per square mile (492.8/km^{2}). There were 409 housing units at an average density of 549.5 per square mile (212.2/km^{2}). The racial makeup of the city was 98.32% White, 0.95% Native American, 0.21% from other races, and 0.53% from two or more races. Hispanic or Latino of any race were 2.11% of the population.

There were 381 households, out of which 36.2% had children under the age of 18 living with them, 47.5% were married couples living together, 12.6% had a female householder with no husband present, and 33.6% were non-families. 26.5% of all households were made up of individuals, and 11.3% had someone living alone who was 65 years of age or older. The average household size was 2.49 and the average family size was 3.03.

29.4% were under the age of 18, 8.5% from 18 to 24, 29.1% from 25 to 44, 21.7% from 45 to 64, and 11.4% were 65 years of age or older. The median age was 34 years. For every 100 females, there were 104.3 males. For every 100 females age 18 and over, there were 102.1 males.

The median income for a household in the city was $32,625, and the median income for a family was $36,023. Males had a median income of $27,460 versus $21,625 for females. The per capita income for the city was $14,955. About 11.4% of families and 11.6% of the population were below the poverty line, including 14.0% of those under age 18 and 6.9% of those age 65 or over.

== Education ==
It is within the Oelwein Community School District.
