= Monti, Iowa =

- Unincorporated community
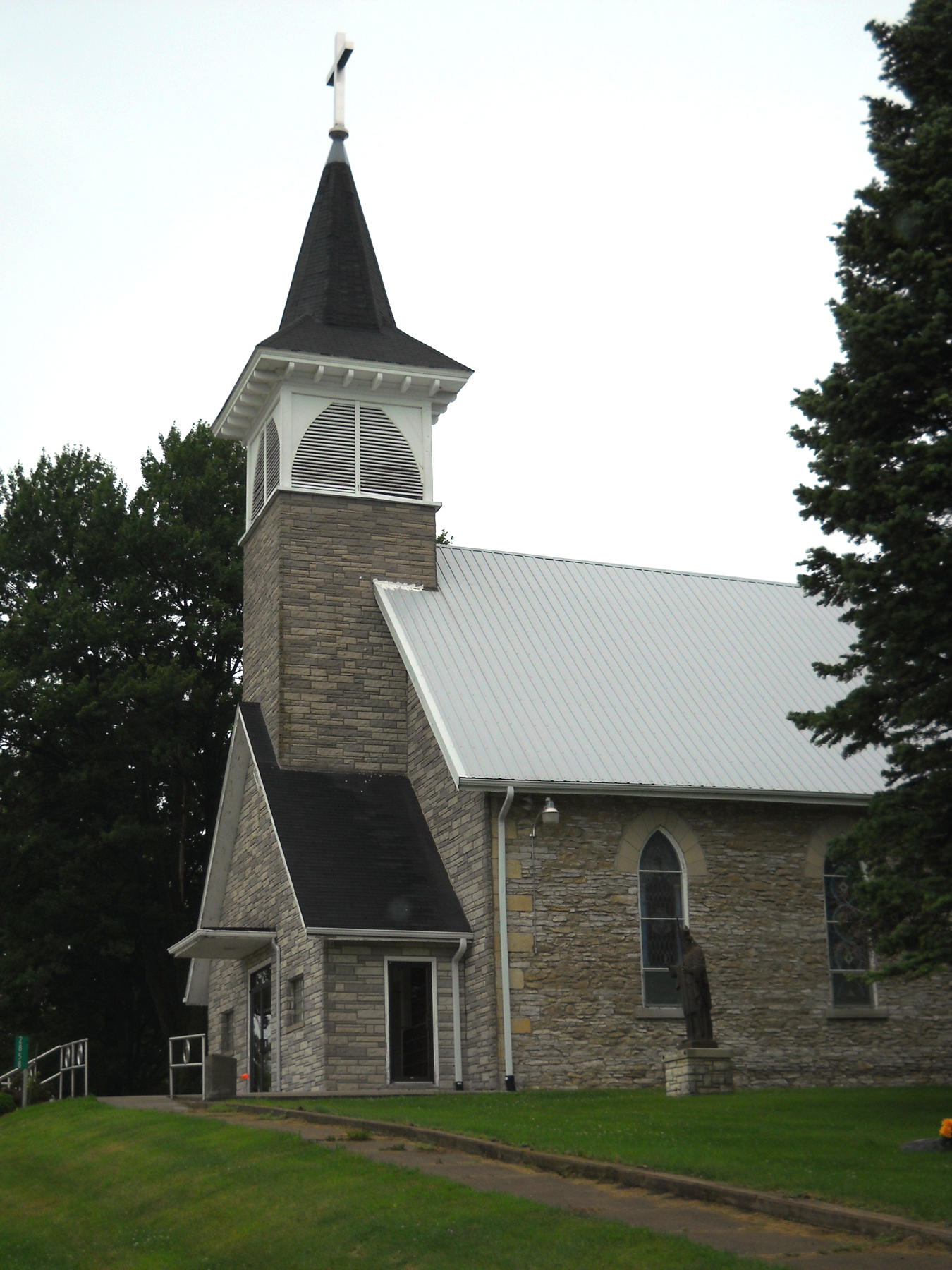
- St. Patrick's Catholic Church of Monti was built in 1870 and operated until 2005.

- Location within the state of Iowa
- Coordinates: 42°22′37″N 91°38′15″W
- Country: United States
- State: Iowa
- County: Buchanan

Government
  - Type: unincorporated community
- Elevation: 1,007 ft (307 m)
- Time zone: UTC-6 (Central (CST))
  - Summer (DST): UTC-5 (CDT)
- Area code: 319
- GNIS feature ID: 464660
- Website: Official website

Monti is an unincorporated community located in the southeast corner of Buchanan County, Iowa, in the United States. Founded in the 1880s and platted in 1905, the community lies on the west bank of Buffalo Creek, 6 miles (10 km) east of Quasqueton and 8 miles (13 km) west of Ryan.

The railroad brought several years of prosperity to the town, but the settlement declined after World War II. Over the years, the closure of the railroad depot, bank, stores, post office, creamery, schools, and church left Monti as the site of four houses, a closed church, a cemetery, and the Monti Community Center.

== Geography ==
Monti is located in the northern part of Newton Township, the southeasternmost of Buchanan County's townships. The village lies along County Road W-45, where that road meets Washington Avenue, an unpaved and unimproved gravel road.

== History ==
The village traces its roots to the late 19th century, when large numbers of Irish immigrants flocked to the state in search of new lives in the New World. The town's Catholic roots can be traced back to the first Irish settlers of Iowa. Monti, along with nearby Masonville, and Fairbank, have been noted as "burgeoning" Irish communities during this era. A large church, St Patrick's Catholic Church of Monti, built in 1870, predates the community. When the Hagen store/post office was built near the Catholic "Buffalo Church", the village of Monti came into existence.

The origins of this post office are obscure. One source states the Monti post office began operations on June 22, 1882. Another source states the post office began on January 24, 1868, but this was the same date as the establishment of the Middlefield post office, several miles to the north.

In 1887, Monti's population was estimated as around 100 residents. The Monti Creamery operated circa 1895.

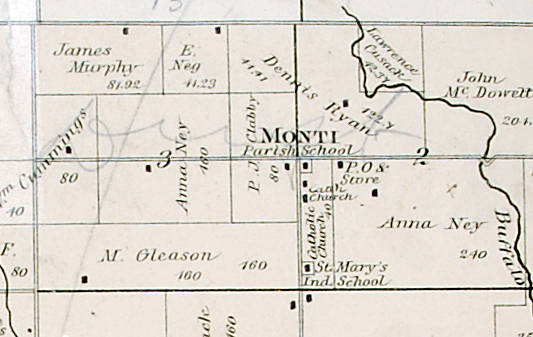
Warner and Foote's 1886 map of Newton Township shows Monti. The plat map shows six houses, two schools, the Catholic church, and the post office/store.

Postal service was discontinued in 1902, with the introduction of Rural Free Delivery; mail was routed through nearby Masonville.

The nearby villages of Newtonville and Kiene were also located in Newton Township. In 1905, the Chicago, Anamosa and Northern Railway was built through Monti and Kiene. The railroad sparked renewed interest in Monti, and a number of new buildings were constructed in 1905. The townsite was platted that year, and St. Patrick's Church registered 400 members. In 1902, Monti's population was 110.

The Monti Savings Bank opened in 1912. Other businesses included Breitbach's grocery store, Scott's hardware store, McMeek's restaurant, Donnelley's barber shop, Maroney's dress shop, Strain's grocery store, O'Hagan's general store, and Wuerth's blacksmith shop.

Monti was a sizeable community in 1913 when E.R. Hensley took a panoramic photograph of the 70 students in St Patrick's confirmation class. Sixty families were registered at St. Patrick's Church. Circa 1910, Monti's population was still estimated at around 100.

However, years of rural migration gradually shrank the area's population, emptying Monti and its nearby sister communities; the town's population began to dwindle. The CAN Railway was sold for scrap after World War I. The remains of the railroad grade can still be seen today at the north edge of the hamlet. By 1917, Monti's population had dropped to 17.

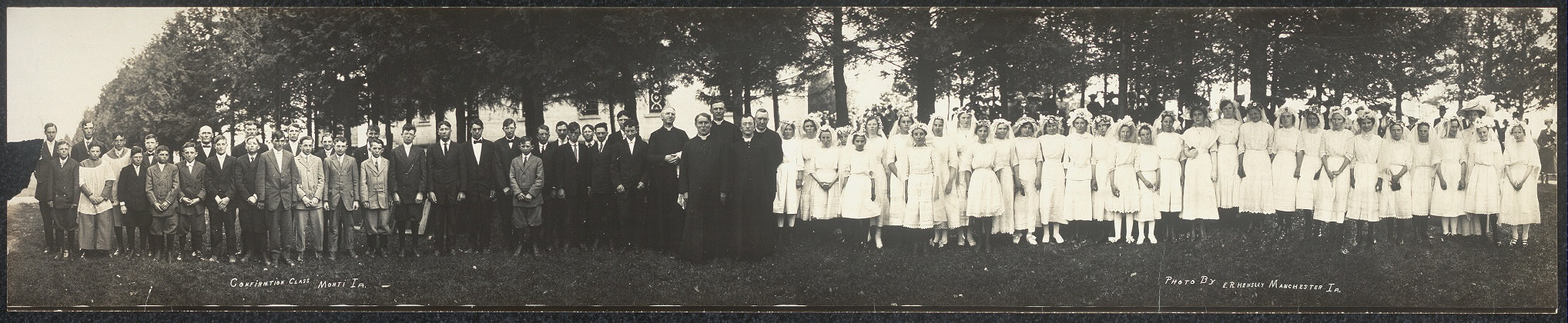
This is a panoramic photo of the 1913 confirmation class at St. Patrick's Catholic Church in Monti.

During the early-to-mid-20th Century, Monti attracted some attention from the ornithology community. Noted ornithologist Fred J. Pierce reported that a large tract of timber 1 mile (2 km) "southeast of the village of Monti, in the southeastern corner of the county" was a particularly good area for birdwatching. In a 1930 paper, Pierce noted the unusual (for the area) birds he had spotted between 1923 and 1928. Among these were one specimen each of the ruffed grouse (1923), cerulean warbler (1927), and in 1928 a yellow-bellied flycatcher and a Connecticut warbler. As late as 1945, the Monti woods were home to at least 62 species of bird; the area was used as one of fourteen birding stations in the state. The woods contained the largest confirmed populations of gray-cheeked thrushes, bobolinks, eastern vesper sparrows, eastern field sparrows, and ruby-crowned kinglets in the state during the spring of 1945. (These same woods were the scene of a gruesome hanging of an unidentified man in July 1900).

In December 1933, St. Patrick's Church was burgled; the thieves made off with $12.00 in church donations.

Monti's population was 15 in 1940.

In 1947 five small rural school districts—Riley's, St. Mary's, Pleasant Valley, Middlefield #7, and Dewey—merged to form the Monti Elementary School District, which opened in September 1947. Classes were originally held at Monti Hall until the new school building opened in 1948.

Monti Hall remained an important gathering place in the community during the mid to late 20th century, with 4H gatherings, community events, and dances held at the hall.

In 1966, the Monti Consolidated School District was disbanded. The northern portions of the district went to East Buchanan Community School District, while the southern areas were ceded to North Linn Community School District.

In 1998, RAGBRAI, a massive cross-state bicycle ride across the state, passed through the hamlet.

In 2005, St Patrick's Catholic Church, which had operated for 135 years, closed its doors. The parish was open from 1870 until July 2005. Since the church has been changed to an oratory the Parish Hall was purchased by the community and the Monti Community Center was formed. The Community Center continues to hold several community events throughout the year as well as hosting many weddings, reunions, and anniversaries. St. Patrick's Church continues to have weddings throughout the year as well as holiday, reunion, and anniversary masses.

An unusual railroad flatcar bridge, constructed from two decommissioned flatcars, was built at the eastern edge of Monti in 2007. The 89-foot-long (27 m), 17-foot-wide (5.2 m) bridge spans Buffalo Creek on York Avenue, a gravel road, one mile (2 km) southeast of the community.

== Monti today ==
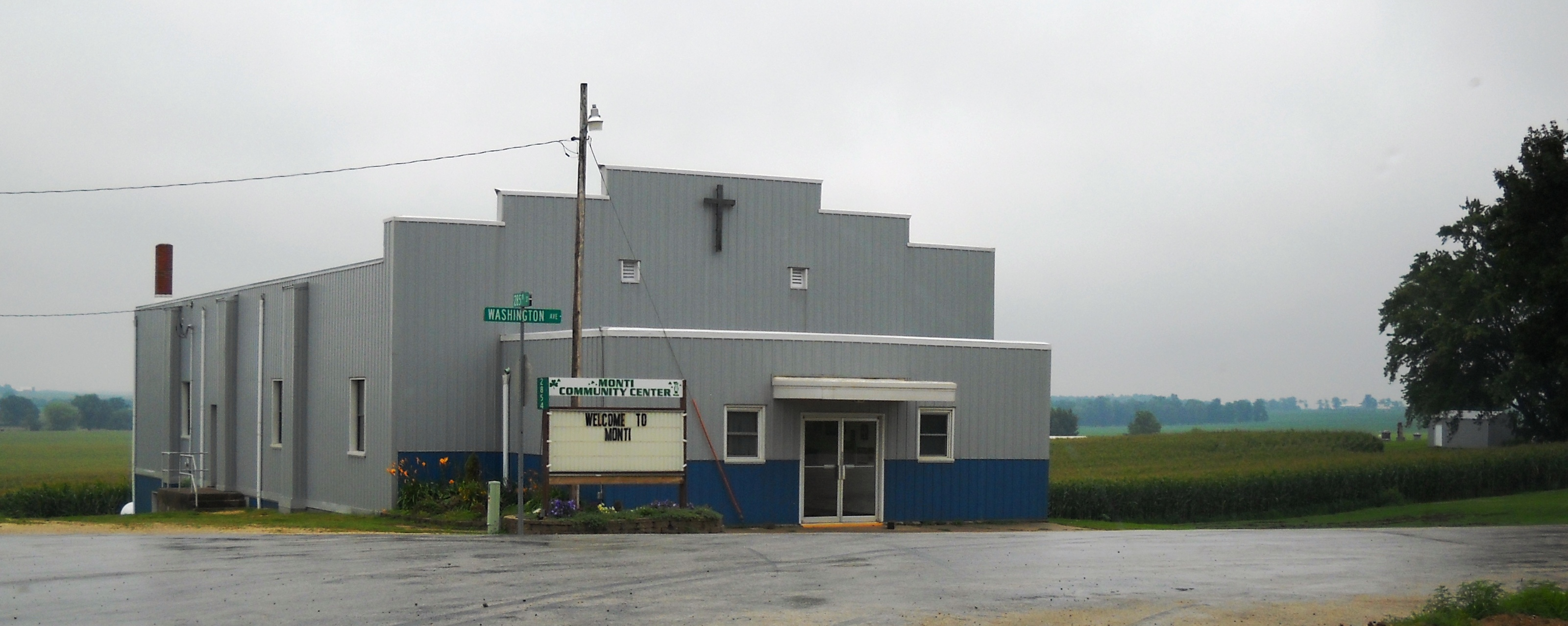
Monti Community Center

Today there are fewer than two dozen residents in this dwindling farm community. Because Monti was never incorporated, population figures were rarely compiled. Although population figures for Monti do not exist, 423 persons live in Newton Township, the 36 square miles (93 km^{2}) around Monti, according to the 2000 Census.

The community still has St. Patrick's Church and the Monti Community Center. The Monti Festival is held in June. Monti students may attend school in either the East Buchanan Community or North Linn School Districts.

In 2024, the Ronald Monaghan farm of Monti was recognized by the Iowa Department of Agriculture as a century farm.

Monti is not found on most maps and can be difficult to locate. The town of Monticello, 30 miles (50 km) east, also causes some confusion. Monti appears on the official State Map of Iowa. Visitors to Monti may locate the community by heading east from Quasqueton on D-47, then turning right (south) on county road W-45, and following that road south and east to a cluster of six houses approximately 10 miles (20 km) southeast of Quasqueton. These houses mark the nucleus of the community. The large Catholic church is the most visible landmark.

== Parks and recreation ==
There are two wildlife areas near Monti. Buffalo Creek Wildlife Area, one mile (2 km) northwest of the community, is a 52-acre (210,000 m^{2}) park established in 1969. Hunting and fishing are allowed with permits. 3 miles (5 km) southeast of Monti is the 158-acre (0.64 km^{2}) Newton Township Natural Area. Canoeing, fishing, and hunting are permitted at the park, which was established in 1998.
