= Aurora, Iowa =

- City
- Motto: A Small Town With a Big Heart
- Location of Aurora, Iowa
- Coordinates: 42°37′10″N 91°43′46″W
- Country: US
- State: Iowa
- County: Buchanan

Area
  - Total: 0.53 sq mi (1.37 km^{2})
  - Land: 0.53 sq mi (1.37 km^{2})
  - Water: 0 sq mi (0.00 km^{2})
- Elevation: 1,132 ft (345 m)

Population (2020)
  - Total: 169
  - Density: 319.4/sq mi (123.32/km^{2})
- Time zone: UTC-6 (Central (CST))
  - Summer (DST): UTC-5 (CDT)
- ZIP code: 50607
- Area code: 319
- FIPS code: 19-03835
- GNIS feature ID: 2394033
- Website: www.auroraiowa.org

Aurora is a city in Buchanan County, Iowa, United States. The population was 169 in the 2020 census, a decline from 194 in 2000.

Aurora was founded in 1886 by the Chicago Great Western Railway, and incorporated in 1899. The town was laid out on land donated by a Bishop Warren and his wife Alice, and is named after Warren's birthplace of East Aurora, New York.

== Geography ==
According to the United States Census Bureau, the city has a total area of 0.57 square miles (1.48 km^{2}), all land.

== Demographics ==
Historical population
Census	Pop.	Note	%±
1900	331		—
1910	287		−13.3%
1920	284		−1.0%
1930	281		−1.1%
1940	276		−1.8%
1950	225		−18.5%
1960	223		−0.9%
1970	229		2.7%
1980	248		8.3%
1990	196		−21.0%
2000	194		−1.0%
2010	185		−4.6%
2020	169		−8.6%
U.S. Decennial Census

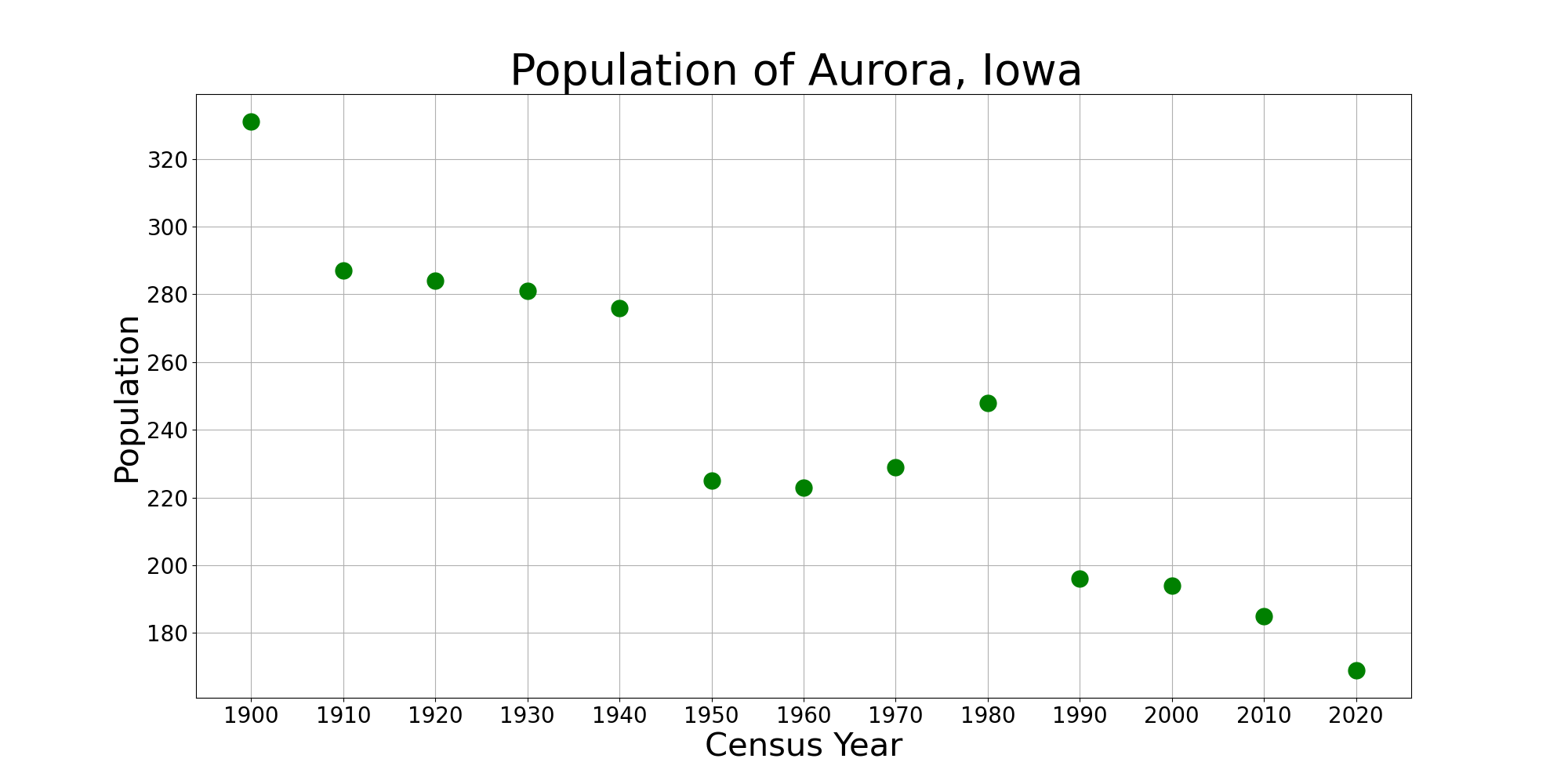
The population of Aurora, Iowa from US census data

=== 2020 census ===
As of the census of 2020, there were 169 people, 74 households, and 52 families residing in the city. The population density was 319.4 inhabitants per square mile (123.3/km^{2}). There were 80 housing units at an average density of 151.2 per square mile (58.4/km^{2}). The racial makeup of the city was 94.7% White, 0.0% Black or African American, 0.0% Native American, 0.0% Asian, 0.0% Pacific Islander, 4.1% from other races and 1.2% from two or more races. Hispanic or Latino persons of any race comprised 5.3% of the population.

Of the 74 households, 32.4% of which had children under the age of 18 living with them, 48.6% were married couples living together, 10.8% were cohabitating couples, 23.0% had a female householder with no spouse or partner present and 17.6% had a male householder with no spouse or partner present. 29.7% of all households were non-families. 23.0% of all households were made up of individuals, 10.8% had someone living alone who was 65 years old or older.

The median age in the city was 38.5 years. 27.8% of the residents were under the age of 20; 6.5% were between the ages of 20 and 24; 26.0% were from 25 and 44; 20.7% were from 45 and 64; and 18.9% were 65 years of age or older. The gender makeup of the city was 49.1% male and 50.9% female.

=== 2010 census ===
As of the census of 2010, there were 185 people, 79 households, and 58 families residing in the city. The population density was 324.6 inhabitants per square mile (125.3/km^{2}). There were 89 housing units at an average density of 156.1 per square mile (60.3/km^{2}). The racial makeup of the city was 95.1% White, 0.5% African American, and 4.3% from two or more races. Hispanic or Latino of any race were 1.6% of the population.

There were 79 households, of which 30.4% had children under the age of 18 living with them, 55.7% were married couples living together, 11.4% had a female householder with no husband present, 6.3% had a male householder with no wife present, and 26.6% were non-families. 24.1% of all households were made up of individuals, and 8.8% had someone living alone who was 65 years of age or older. The average household size was 2.34 and the average family size was 2.69.

The median age in the city was 43.7 years. 22.2% of residents were under the age of 18; 7% were between the ages of 18 and 24; 22.1% were from 25 to 44; 31.2% were from 45 to 64; and 17.3% were 65 years of age or older. The gender makeup of the city was 54.1% male and 45.9% female.

=== 2000 census ===
As of the census of 2000, there were 194 people, 78 households, and 52 families residing in the city. The population density was 338.5 inhabitants per square mile (130.7/km^{2}). There were 88 housing units at an average density of 153.5 per square mile (59.3/km^{2}). The racial makeup of the city was 94.85% White, 0.52% Native American, and 4.64% from two or more races.

There were 78 households, out of which 33.3% had children under the age of 18 living with them, 55.1% were married couples living together, 11.5% had a female householder with no husband present, and 32.1% were non-families. 29.5% of all households were made up of individuals, and 16.7% had someone living alone who was 65 years of age or older. The average household size was 2.49 and the average family size was 3.09.

In the city, the population was spread out, with 28.4% under the age of 18, 7.2% from 18 to 24, 26.3% from 25 to 44, 21.6% from 45 to 64, and 16.5% who were 65 years of age or older. The median age was 37 years. For every 100 females, there were 94.0 males. For every 100 females age 18 and over, there were 104.4 males.

The median income for a household in the city was $38,750, and the median income for a family was $42,188. Males had a median income of $25,000 versus $22,500 for females. The per capita income for the city was $16,254. About 15.8% of families and 19.5% of the population were below the poverty line, including 28.8% of those under the age of eighteen and 13.3% of those 65 or over.

== Education ==
Aurora is served by the East Buchanan Community School District.

The first school in Aurora was housed in the Aurora Town Hall. A new schoolhouse was constructed in 1928. Aurora's school district was the Aurora Independent School District. In 1959, voters approved a merger of schools in Winthrop, Quasqueton, and Aurora, forming the East Buchanan School District (neighboring Monti was added to the district in 1966). Aurora had its own school in the East Buchanan School District, North Elementary School, until enrollment at the school declined to the point that in May 1977, the school was closed and was sold to the City of Aurora for $1.00. After that date, students were bussed to Winthrop.
