= Newton Township, Buchanan County, Iowa =

Township in Iowa, US

Newton Township, Buchanan County
- Township
- Coordinates: 42°19′51″N 091°39′14″W
- Country: United States
- State: Iowa
- County: Buchanan

Area
  - Total: 36.33 sq mi (94.09 km^{2})
  - Land: 36.26 sq mi (93.92 km^{2})
  - Water: 0.066 sq mi (0.17 km^{2})
- Elevation: 935 ft (285 m)

Population (2020)
  - Total: 353
- FIPS code: 19-93096
- GNIS feature ID: 0468437

Newton Township is one of sixteen townships in Buchanan County, Iowa, United States. As of the 2020 census, its population was 353.

== Geography ==
Newton Township covers an area of 36.33 square miles (94.1 km^{2}) and contains no incorporated settlements. The unincorporated community of Monti is in the northern portion of the township. Other settlements in the township from the late 19th and early 20th centuries are abandoned. According to the USGS, Newton Township contains three cemeteries: Circle Grove, Saint Patrick's and Upper Spring Grove. Circle Grove Cemetery, established 1858, is maintained by the Circle Grove Cemetery Association. Upper Spring Grove Cemetery, established 1855, is classified as a Pioneer Cemetery with maintenance under the direction of the Newton Township trustees.

== History ==
=== Early years ===
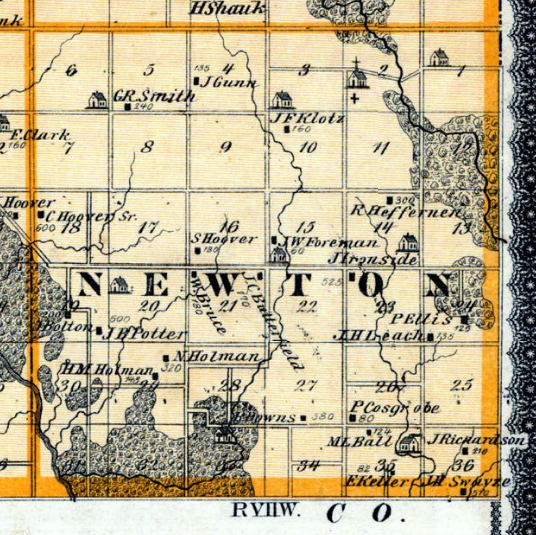
Newton Township in 1875. The township had seven schools and two churches.

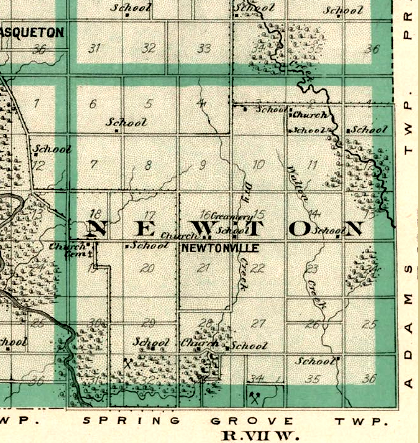
Newton Township in 1904. Newtonville is displayed prominently in the center of the township. There were two schools, a creamery, and a church in Newtonville. This church was moved three miles north in 1914. Atlanta and Monti are not labeled on this map, but are in the northern and southern portions of the township, respectively. Kiene is not shown on this map because it wasn't founded until 1911.

The first permanent white settler in Newton Township was a Joseph Austin, who built a cabin "by a spring at the edge of some timber in the township" sometime before or during 1847. The first election was held in the southern part of the township in August 1854. Many early settlers of the area were from Ireland.

A number of early settlements developed during this era. The Erin post office opened in 1854, being one of the first post offices in the then newly-created Buchanan County. Erin was located at 42.369°N 91.600°W (Section 1). William Fanning was the Erin postmaster in 1857.

The Newton Centre post office opened in 1855, in the southern part of the township. The first postmaster was Ulysses Geiger. This was also the area where the first store in the township was; the store was owned by J.S. Long. The post office was closed in 1873, in favor of a post office near the center of the township.

The Atlanta (also called Atlantic) post office opened in 1857. Atlanta was located at 42.311°N 91.685°W (Sections 28 and 33).

Three cemeteries were established in the 1850s. In 1858, a Protestant congregation formed and met in a schoolhouse, then in 1884 erected a church building adjacent to the Circle Grove Cemetery in section 19, known as Hoover Church. A Catholic church and rectory were constructed adjoining the northern cemetery in 1870.

The Erin post office closed in 1863.

Newtonville was established in either 1869 or 1873, when a post office was established near the center of the township, at 42.347°N 91.675°W (Sections 16 and 17, see map on right). In 1875, the State Atlas of Iowa showed two churches, seven schools, and 19 houses in the township. Just 11 years later, in 1886, Warner and Foote's map of Newton Township showed 137 houses, ten schools, three churches, and two post offices in the township.

The Atlanta post office closed in 1875.

The population of Newton Township was 588 in 1880.

The Monti post office was established in 1882, on Buffalo Creek in the northern part of the township, at the location of the Catholic church (Sections 2 and 3).

Circa 1895, Newtonville was the site of the Newtonville Creamery. It was managed by W.W. Wilde. The Monti Creamery was managed by J.A. Donnelly.

Among the more prominent residents of Newtonville was Chester W. Butterfield, whose grandparents, Justice C. and Maria (Irvin) Butterfield, settled the Newton Center area in 1859. Chester was a farmer and a director of the school, and married Jennie (Cooper) Butterfield). They had five children and were members of the Newtonville church, with an area historian writing, "throughout the community in which they live are held in high esteem."

=== Twentieth century ===
With the introduction of Rural Free Delivery in 1902, both the Newtonville and Monti post offices closed. During that year, Newtonville's population was 27.

In 1911, the village of Kiene was founded 1.5 miles west of Monti at 42.384°N 91.661°W (Section 4), the result of a planned railway through the area. Kiene was named after Henry Kiene or Peter Kiene, presidents of the proposed rail line, who planned a rail route west from Dubuque toward Independence in 1903. The Chicago, Anamosa and Northern (CAN) Railway was built through Newton Township in 1912 and passed through both Kiene and Monti. Monti soon became a small but bustling community, with stores, a blacksmith shop, a bank, and a flag station. In 1900, Monti's population was 110, and in 1920, it was 100.

While Monti and Kiene were boosted by the CAN Railway, Newtonville began to founder. According to a 1914 history of the area, "the village of Newtonville [was] seriously handicapped by the lack of transportation facilities, and consequently has never reached a stage of development. There are one or two lodges there and one church: the Wesleyan Methodist". The old Newtonville Congregational Church was moved to Kiene in June 1914, and a new church was built at Newtonville. Around this time, the Newtonville Church had around 65 members. Kiene was a village of 25 residents in 1914. In 1924, Kiene's population was 17.

The post-World War I years saw a decline in the area's population. The CAN railroad was sold for scrap during World War II. The Newtonville area emptied.

By 1940, Kiene's population was just 8. The Kiene post office closed in 1944. By 1955, the only structure remaining at Kiene was the church.

The Newtonville School district buildings were sold at auction on March 1, 1947. Included in the sale were the 22 feet (6.7 m) by 28 feet (8.5 m) schoolhouse and two outbuildings.

The official 1956 school district map for Buchanan County shows only the locations of Kiene and Monti; by this time, the other villages were gone. The Kiene Women's Fellowship organization and other groups were meeting at the church into the 1960s. The Kiene Congregational Church closed in 1970, its congregation merged into the Church of Christ United in Winthrop.

The school at Monti closed in 1966, with the disbanding of the Monti Consolidated School District. The northern portions of the district went to East Buchanan Community School District, while the southern areas were ceded to North Linn Community School District.

Today the only settlement left in Newton Township is Monti; traces of the old railroad grade can still be seen at the northern edge of the hamlet. St. Patrick's Catholic Church at Monti ceased regular masses in 2005.

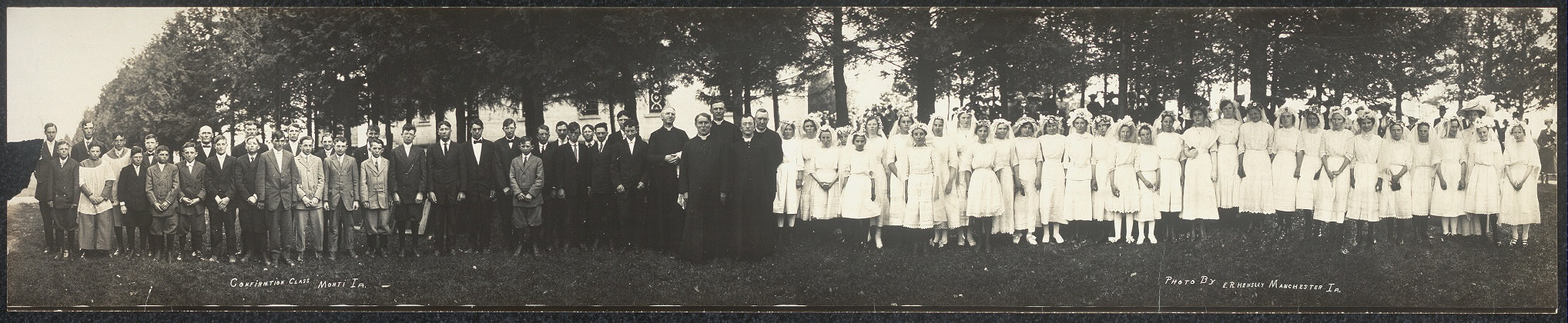
This is a panoramic photo of the 1913 confirmation class at St. Patrick's Catholic Church in Monti.

== Parks and recreation ==
There are two wildlife areas in Newton Township. The Newton Township Wildlife Area, established in 1998, is a 158-acre (0.64 km^{2}) park located three miles (4.8 km) southeast of Monti at the eastern edge of the township. Canoeing, fishing, and hunting are permitted at the park. Frogville Access, established in 1978, is a 116-acre (0.47 km^{2}) park between Quasqueton and Troy Mills. It lies in the southwestern corner of the township.
