= Brandon, Iowa =

- City
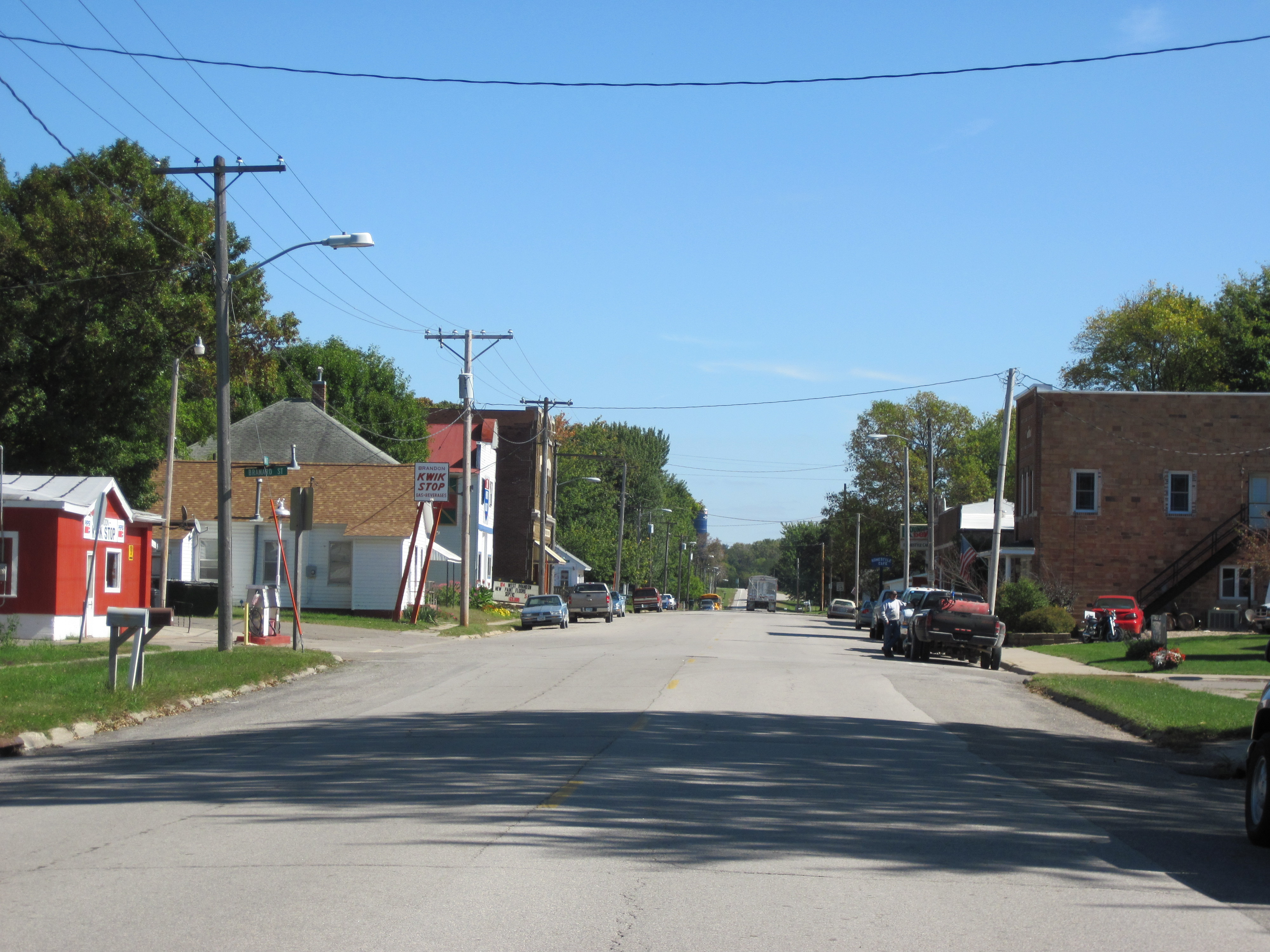
- Street scene in Brandon

- Location of Brandon, Iowa
- Coordinates: 42°18′55″N 92°00′06″W
- Country: US
- State: Iowa
- County: Buchanan

Area
  - Total: 0.32 sq mi (0.84 km^{2})
  - Land: 0.32 sq mi (0.84 km^{2})
  - Water: 0 sq mi (0.00 km^{2})
- Elevation: 833 ft (254 m)

Population (2020)
  - Total: 341
  - Density: 1,051.1/sq mi (405.83/km^{2})
- Time zone: UTC-6 (Central (CST))
  - Summer (DST): UTC-5 (CDT)
- ZIP code: 52210
- Area code: 319
- FIPS code: 19-08155
- GNIS feature ID: 2394240
- Website: www.brandoniowa.com

Brandon is a city in Buchanan County, Iowa, United States. The population was 341 at the 2020 census.

== Geography ==
According to the United States Census Bureau, the city has a total area of 0.32 square miles (0.83 km^{2}), all land.

== Demographics ==
Historical populations
Year	Pop.	±%
1910	200	—
1920	343	+71.5%
1930	308	−10.2%
1940	324	+5.2%
1950	319	−1.5%
1960	322	+0.9%
1970	432	+34.2%
1980	337	−22.0%
1990	320	−5.0%
2000	311	−2.8%
2010	309	−0.6%
2020	341	+10.4%
Source:"US Census website". United States Census Bureau. and Iowa Data Center; Source: US Decennial Census

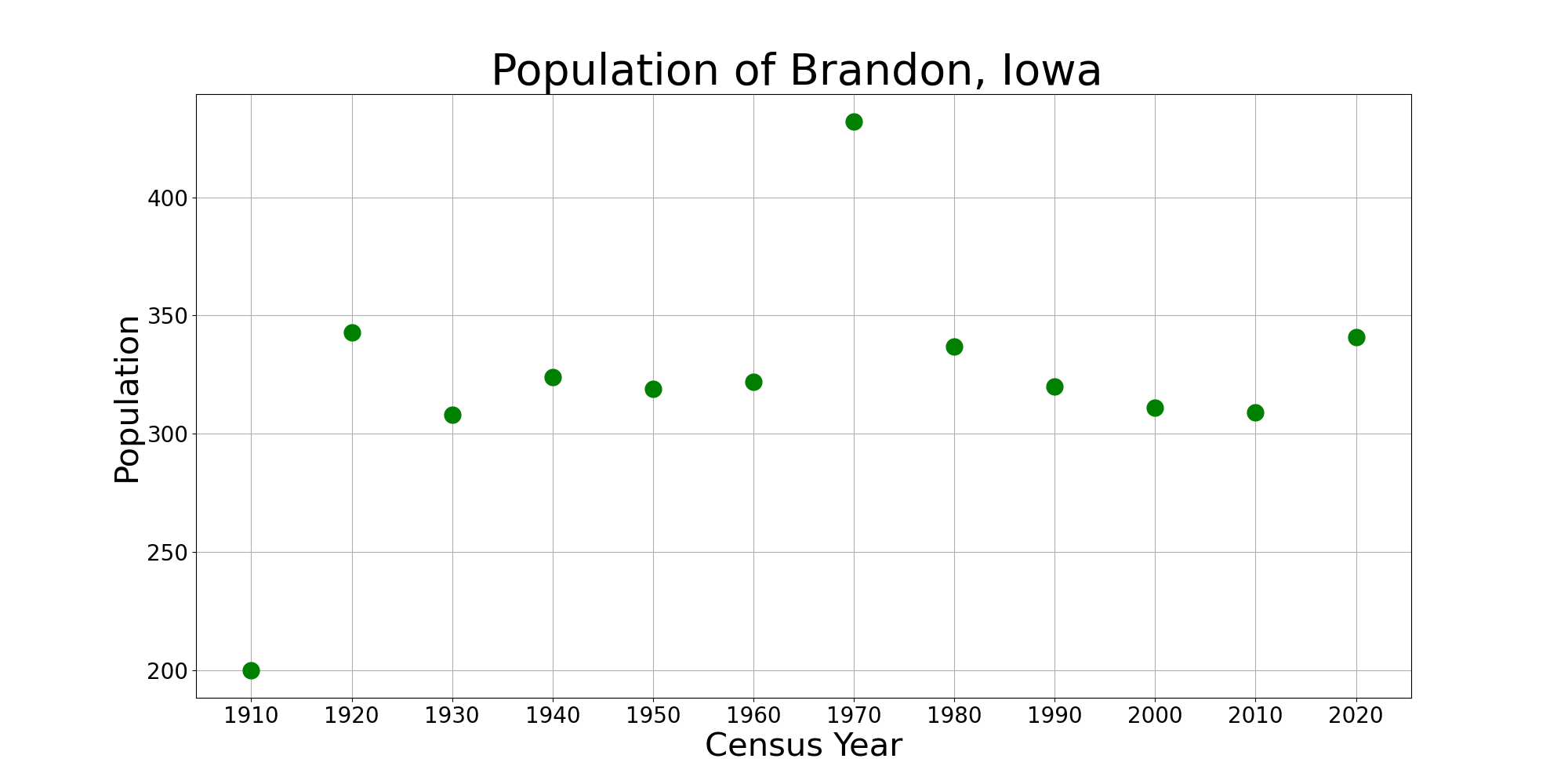
The population of Brandon, Iowa, from US census data

=== 2020 census ===
As of the census of 2020, there were 341 people, 141 households, and 75 families residing in the city. The population density was 1,051.1 inhabitants per square mile (405.8/km^{2}). There were 152 housing units at an average density of 468.5 per square mile (180.9/km^{2}). The racial makeup of the city was 96.2% White, 0.0% Black or African American, 0.0% Native American, 0.0% Asian, 0.0% Pacific Islander, 0.3% from other races and 3.5% from two or more races. Hispanic or Latino persons of any race comprised 4.1% of the population.

Of the 141 households, 29.8% of which had children under the age of 18 living with them, 37.6% were married couples living together, 10.6% were cohabitating couples, 22.0% had a female householder with no spouse or partner present and 29.8% had a male householder with no spouse or partner present. 46.8% of all households were non-families. 36.2% of all households were made up of individuals, and 14.9% had someone living alone who was 65 years old or older.

The median age in the city was 36.6 years. 29.6% of the residents were under the age of 20; 5.0% were between the ages of 20 and 24; 24.9% were from 25 and 44; 23.8% were from 45 and 64; and 16.7% were 65 years of age or older. The gender makeup of the city was 52.2% male and 47.8% female.

=== 2010 census ===
As of the census of 2010, there were 309 people, 130 households, and 82 families living in the city. The population density was 965.6 inhabitants per square mile (372.8/km^{2}). There were 152 housing units at an average density of 475.0 per square mile (183.4/km^{2}). The racial makeup of the city was 95.8% White, 0.3% African American, 1.3% Native American, 0.3% Pacific Islander, 1.0% from other races, and 1.3% from two or more races. Hispanic or Latino people of any race were 5.2% of the population.

There were 130 households, of which 35.4% had children under the age of 18 living with them, 43.8% were married couples living together, 13.1% had a female householder with no husband present, 6.2% had a male householder with no wife present, and 36.9% were non-families. 30.0% of all households were made up of individuals, and 13.9% had someone living alone who was 65 years of age or older. The average household size was 2.38, and the average family size was 2.95.

The median age in the city was 36.1 years. 26.5% of residents were under the age of 18; 8.8% were between the ages of 18 and 24; 24.5% were from 25 to 44; 25.9% were from 45 to 64; and 14.2% were 65 years of age or older. The gender makeup of the city was 48.9% male and 51.1% female.

=== 2000 census ===
As of the census of 2000, there were 311 people, 137 households, and 90 families living in the city. The population density was 997.9 inhabitants per square mile (385.3/km^{2}). There were 146 housing units at an average density of 468.5 per square mile (180.9/km^{2}). The racial makeup of the city was 99.04% White and 0.96% Native American.

There were 137 households, out of which 26.3% had children under the age of 18 living with them, 49.6% were married couples living together, 10.2% had a female householder with no husband present, and 33.6% were non-families. 30.7% of all households were made up of individuals, and 13.1% had someone living alone who was 65 years of age or older. The average household size was 2.27 and the average family size was 2.79.

In the city, the population was spread out, with 21.5% under the age of 18, 10.0% from 18 to 24, 24.4% from 25 to 44, 27.0% from 45 to 64, and 17.0% who were 65 years of age or older. The median age was 38 years. For every 100 females, there were 100.6 males. For every 100 females age 18 and over, there were 105.0 males.

The median income for a household in the city was $34,219, and the median income for a family was $45,893. Males had a median income of $25,625 versus $20,208 for females. The per capita income for the city was $17,428. About 4.5% of families and 9.4% of the population were below the poverty line, including 13.0% of those under age 18 and 15.1% of those age 65 or over.

== Education ==
The Independence Community School District operates area public schools.

== Roadside attraction ==
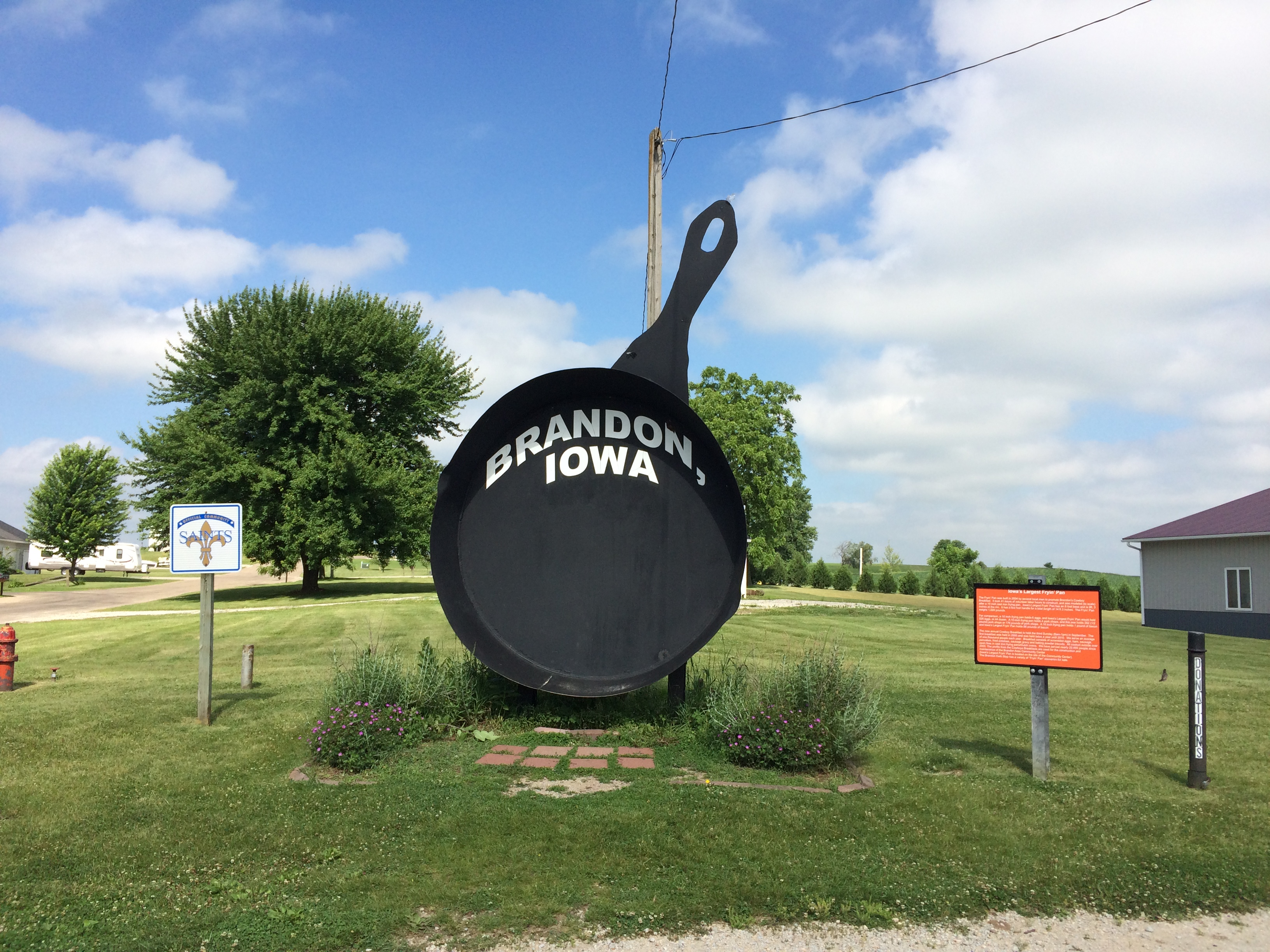
Brandon, Iowa Frying Pan

Brandon is home to Iowa's largest frying pan. Constructed in 2004, the frying pan promotes the Brandon Community Club's semi-annual Cowboy Breakfast. The pan weighs over 1,000 pounds.

It took these men just over forty volunteer hours to construct the frying pan. It is made out of scrap steel that was donated by local farmers. The pan was originally built as a promotional tool for the Brandon Area Community Club's annual fundraiser, the "cowboy breakfast". They chose to build a large frying pan because the cowboy breakfast is cooked over open flames using mostly cast-iron frying pans.

=== Dimensions ===
It is quantitatively 10 times the size of a 10-inch frying pan.

- Weight: 1,200 pounds
- Total length: 14 feet 3 inches
- Rim diameter: 9 feet 3 inches
- Base diameter: 8 feet
- Handle length: 5 feet
