= Quasqueton, Iowa =

- City
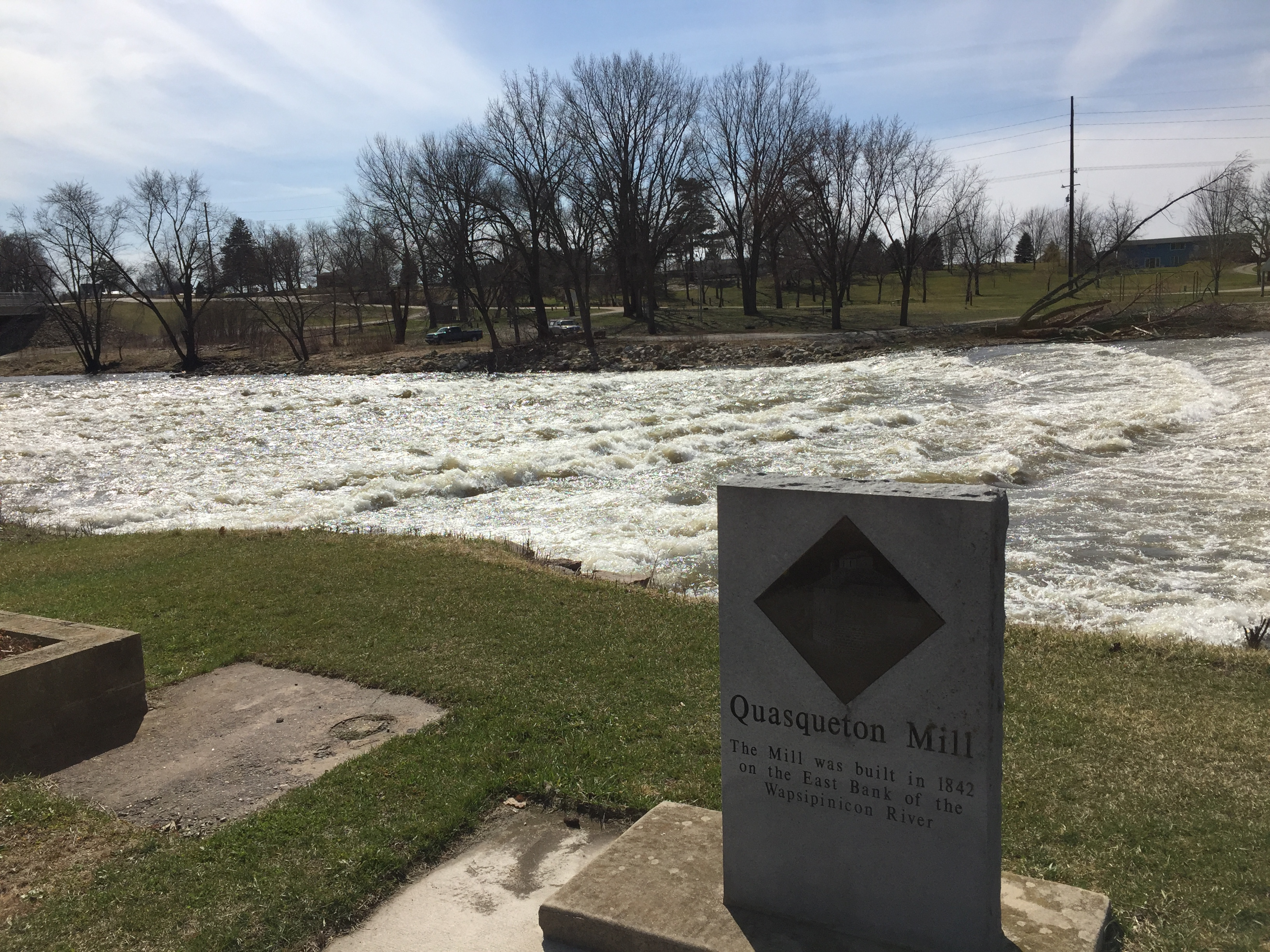
- Rapids on the Wapsipinicon River with old mill monument at Quasqueton
- Motto: "Friendliest town by a dam site"
- Location of Quasqueton, Iowa
- Coordinates: 42°23′39″N 91°45′14″W
- Country: United States
- State: Iowa
- County: Buchanan

Area
  - Total: 1.16 sq mi (3.00 km^{2})
  - Land: 1.13 sq mi (2.92 km^{2})
  - Water: 0.031 sq mi (0.08 km^{2})
- Elevation: 886 ft (270 m)

Population (2020)
  - Total: 570
  - Density: 505.0/sq mi (194.97/km^{2})
- Time zone: UTC-6 (Central (CST))
  - Summer (DST): UTC-5 (CDT)
- ZIP code: 52326
- Area code: 319
- FIPS code: 19-65235
- GNIS feature ID: 2396297
- Website: quasky.com

Quasqueton is a city in Buchanan County, Iowa, United States. The population was 570 at the time of the 2020 census. Just northwest of the town is Cedar Rock, a home designed by Frank Lloyd Wright, which is maintained by the state as a museum.

== History ==
Quasqueton is the oldest community in Buchanan County. It first appears in the 1840 Census, although later sources state it was founded in 1842. Quasqueton's name is of Meskwaki (Fox) origins; it was originally called "Quasquetuck" or "Quaquetuck".

Quasqueton's population was 43 in 1840. At that time, it was the county seat of Buchanan County. The first grist mill in Quasqueton was built in 1842.

The Quasqueton post office was established in 1844.

The second newspaper in Buchanan County (after only the Independence Civilian), the Quasqueton Guardian, was founded in Quasqueton in December 1856. The founders of the paper were Jacob Rich and George C. Jordan. The founders moved the paper to Independence in 1858 and changed the name to the Buchanan County Guardian. Jordan died during the Civil War, while fighting on the side of the Union. The paper was sold to S.B. Goodenow in 1864 and became the Guardian of Independence. In 1866, the Guardian was sold to J.L. Loomis, who merged the paper with the Buchanan County Bulletin. The merged paper was named the Buchanan County Bulletin and Guardian. The paper was sold to William Toman in 1869, and the name was changed back to the Independence Bulletin. In 1891, the paper was merged with the Independence Journal, becoming the Independence Bulletin-Journal. The paper was later merged with the independence Conservative, becoming the Independence Conservative Bulletin-Journal. Today it is known as the Independence Bulletin Journal.

In 1858 the Quaqueton Mutual Protection Company was organized to prevent against horse thievery. In 1904 most of Quasqueton was destroyed in a fire.

== Geography ==
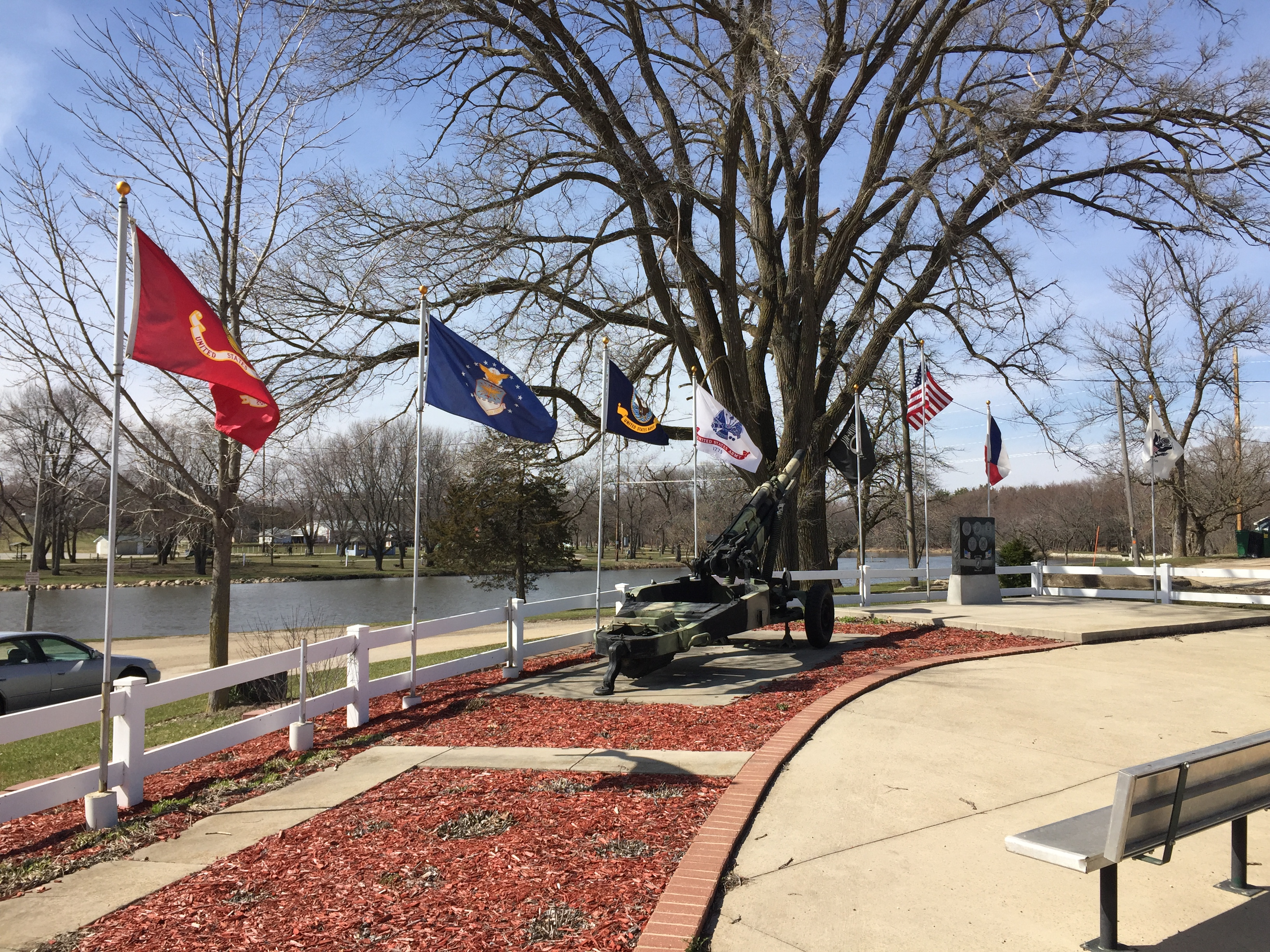
Quasqueton, Iowa Veterans' Memorial

According to the United States Census Bureau, the city has a total area of 1.16 square miles (3.00 km^{2}), of which 1.13 square miles (2.93 km^{2}) is land and 0.03 square miles (0.08 km^{2}) is water.

== Demographics ==
Historical populations
Year	Pop.	±%
1880	529	—
1910	394	−25.5%
1920	453	+15.0%
1930	342	−24.5%
1940	400	+17.0%
1950	374	−6.5%
1960	373	−0.3%
1970	464	+24.4%
1980	599	+29.1%
1990	579	−3.3%
2000	574	−0.9%
2010	554	−3.5%
2020	570	+2.9%
Source:"U.S. Census website". United States Census Bureau. and Iowa Data Center; Source: U.S. Decennial Census

=== 2020 census ===
As of the census of 2020, there were 570 people, 239 households, and 160 families residing in the city. The population density was 505.0 inhabitants per square mile (195.0/km^{2}). There were 265 housing units at an average density of 234.8 per square mile (90.6/km^{2}). The racial makeup of the city was 96.1% White, 0.0% Black or African American, 0.0% Native American, 0.0% Asian, 0.0% Pacific Islander, 0.4% from other races and 3.5% from two or more races. Hispanic or Latino persons of any race comprised 0.9% of the population.

Of the 239 households, 26.4% of which had children under the age of 18 living with them, 51.9% were married couples living together, 7.1% were cohabitating couples, 23.4% had a female householder with no spouse or partner present and 17.6% had a male householder with no spouse or partner present. 33.1% of all households were non-families. 29.7% of all households were made up of individuals, 15.9% had someone living alone who was 65 years old or older.

The median age in the city was 44.1 years. 24.4% of the residents were under the age of 20; 3.9% were between the ages of 20 and 24; 24.0% were from 25 and 44; 29.6% were from 45 and 64; and 18.1% were 65 years of age or older. The gender makeup of the city was 50.2% male and 49.8% female.

=== 2010 census ===
As of the census of 2010, there were 554 people, 232 households, and 162 families living in the city. The population density was 490.3 inhabitants per square mile (189.3/km^{2}). There were 269 housing units at an average density of 238.1 per square mile (91.9/km^{2}). The racial makeup of the city was 97.1% White, 0.9% African American, 0.2% Asian, 0.2% from other races, and 1.6% from two or more races. Hispanic or Latino of any race were 0.7% of the population.

There were 232 households, of which 24.6% had children under the age of 18 living with them, 57.8% were married couples living together, 7.8% had a female householder with no husband present, 4.3% had a male householder with no wife present, and 30.2% were non-families. 22.8% of all households were made up of individuals, and 9.5% had someone living alone who was 65 years of age or older. The average household size was 2.39 and the average family size was 2.80.

The median age in the city was 40.4 years. 20.9% of residents were under the age of 18; 9.3% were between the ages of 18 and 24; 26% were from 25 to 44; 30.7% were from 45 to 64; and 13% were 65 years of age or older. The gender makeup of the city was 51.8% male and 48.2% female.

=== 2000 census ===
As of the census of 2000, there were 574 people, 227 households, and 167 families living in the city. The population density was 501.0 inhabitants per square mile (193.4/km^{2}). There were 254 housing units at an average density of 221.7 per square mile (85.6/km^{2}). The racial makeup of the city was 97.04% White, 1.39% African American, 1.05% Native American, 0.17% Asian, 0.35% from other races. Hispanic or Latino of any race were 0.87% of the population.

There were 227 households, out of which 31.3% had children under the age of 18 living with them, 61.7% were married couples living together, 9.3% had a female householder with no husband present, and 26.4% were non-families. 19.4% of all households were made up of individuals, and 10.1% had someone living alone who was 65 years of age or older. The average household size was 2.53 and the average family size was 2.92.

In the city, the population was spread out, with 26.1% under the age of 18, 6.3% from 18 to 24, 25.6% from 25 to 44, 26.8% from 45 to 64, and 15.2% who were 65 years of age or older. The median age was 38 years. For every 100 females, there were 104.3 males. For every 100 females age 18 and over, there were 101.9 males.

The median income for a household in the city was $36,518, and the median income for a family was $45,417. Males had a median income of $28,125 versus $23,750 for females. The per capita income for the city was $15,913. About 7.9% of families and 9.9% of the population were below the poverty line, including 13.6% of those under age 18 and 6.3% of those age 65 or over.

== Notable person ==
- Larry Lujack Radio DJ born Larry Lee Blankenburg in Quasqueton, June 6, 1940; died December 18, 2013.
