= Lists of ghost towns in the United States =

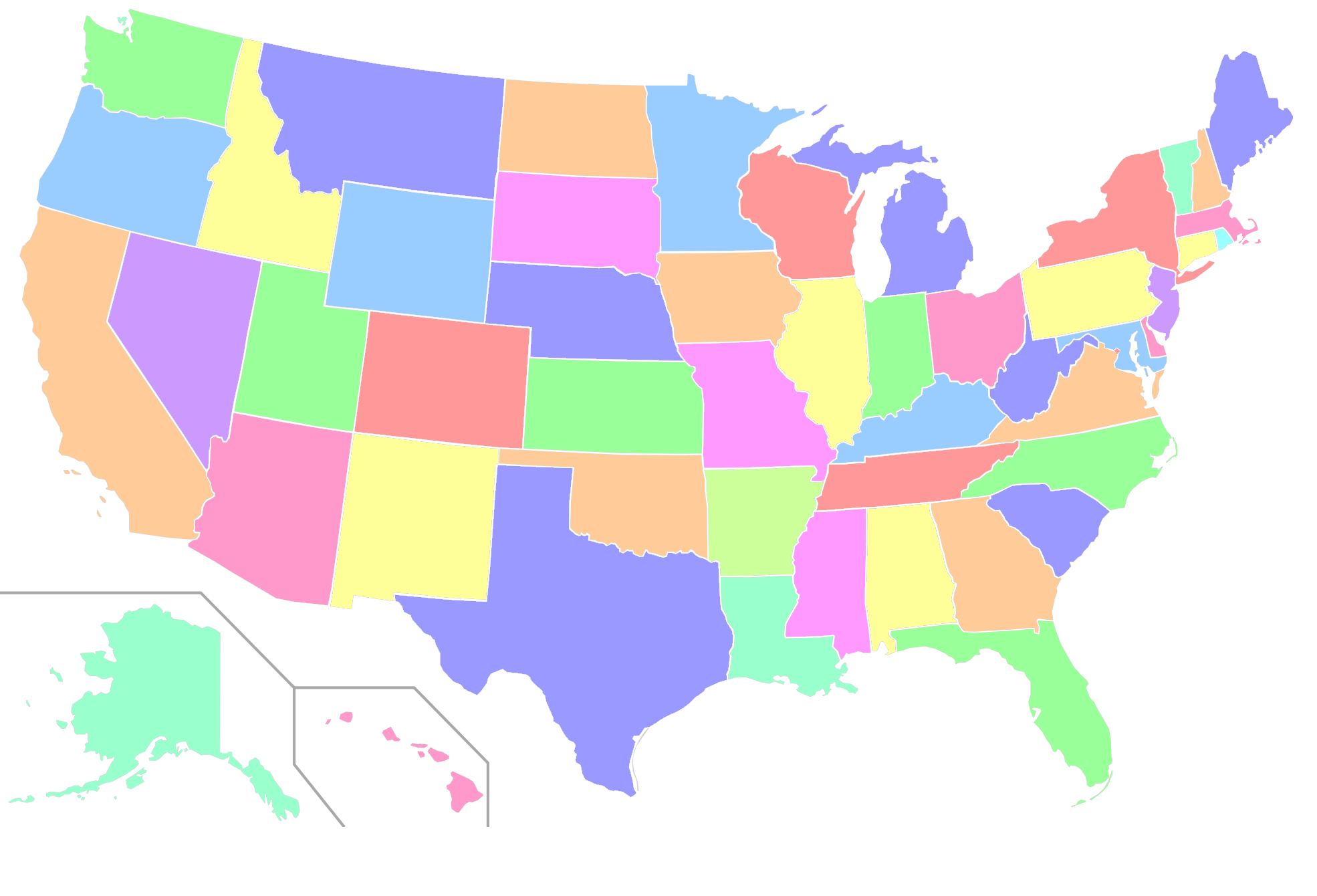

This is a list of lists of ghost towns in the United States by state.

- List of ghost towns in Alabama
- List of ghost towns in Alaska
- List of ghost towns in Arizona
- List of ghost towns in Arkansas
- List of ghost towns in California
- List of ghost towns in Colorado
- List of ghost towns in Connecticut
- List of ghost towns in Delaware
- List of ghost towns in Florida
- List of ghost towns in Georgia
- List of ghost towns in Hawaii
- List of ghost towns in Idaho
- List of ghost towns in Illinois
- List of ghost towns in Indiana
- List of ghost towns in Iowa
- List of ghost towns in Kansas
- List of ghost towns in Kentucky
- List of ghost towns in Louisiana
- List of ghost towns in Maine
- List of ghost towns in Maryland
- List of ghost towns in Massachusetts
- List of ghost towns in Michigan
- List of ghost towns in Minnesota
- List of ghost towns in Mississippi
- List of ghost towns in Missouri
- List of ghost towns in Montana
- List of ghost towns in Nebraska
- List of ghost towns in Nevada
- List of ghost towns in New Hampshire
- List of ghost towns in New Jersey
- List of ghost towns in New Mexico
- List of ghost towns in New York
- List of ghost towns in North Carolina
- List of ghost towns in North Dakota
- List of ghost towns in Ohio
- List of ghost towns in Oklahoma
- List of ghost towns in Oregon
- List of ghost towns in Pennsylvania
- List of ghost towns in Rhode Island
- List of ghost towns in South Carolina
- List of ghost towns in South Dakota
- List of ghost towns in Tennessee
- List of ghost towns in Texas
- List of ghost towns in Utah
- List of ghost towns in Vermont
- List of ghost towns in Virginia
- List of ghost towns in Washington
- List of ghost towns in West Virginia
- List of ghost towns in Wisconsin
- List of ghost towns in Wyoming

== See also ==
- Dogpatch USA
- Ghost Town in the Sky
- Ghost Town, Oakland, California
- Ghost town
- List of ghost towns by country
- List of flooded towns in the United States
- Lists of ghost towns in Canada
- Lists of unincorporated communities in the United States
