= List of ghost towns in Vermont =

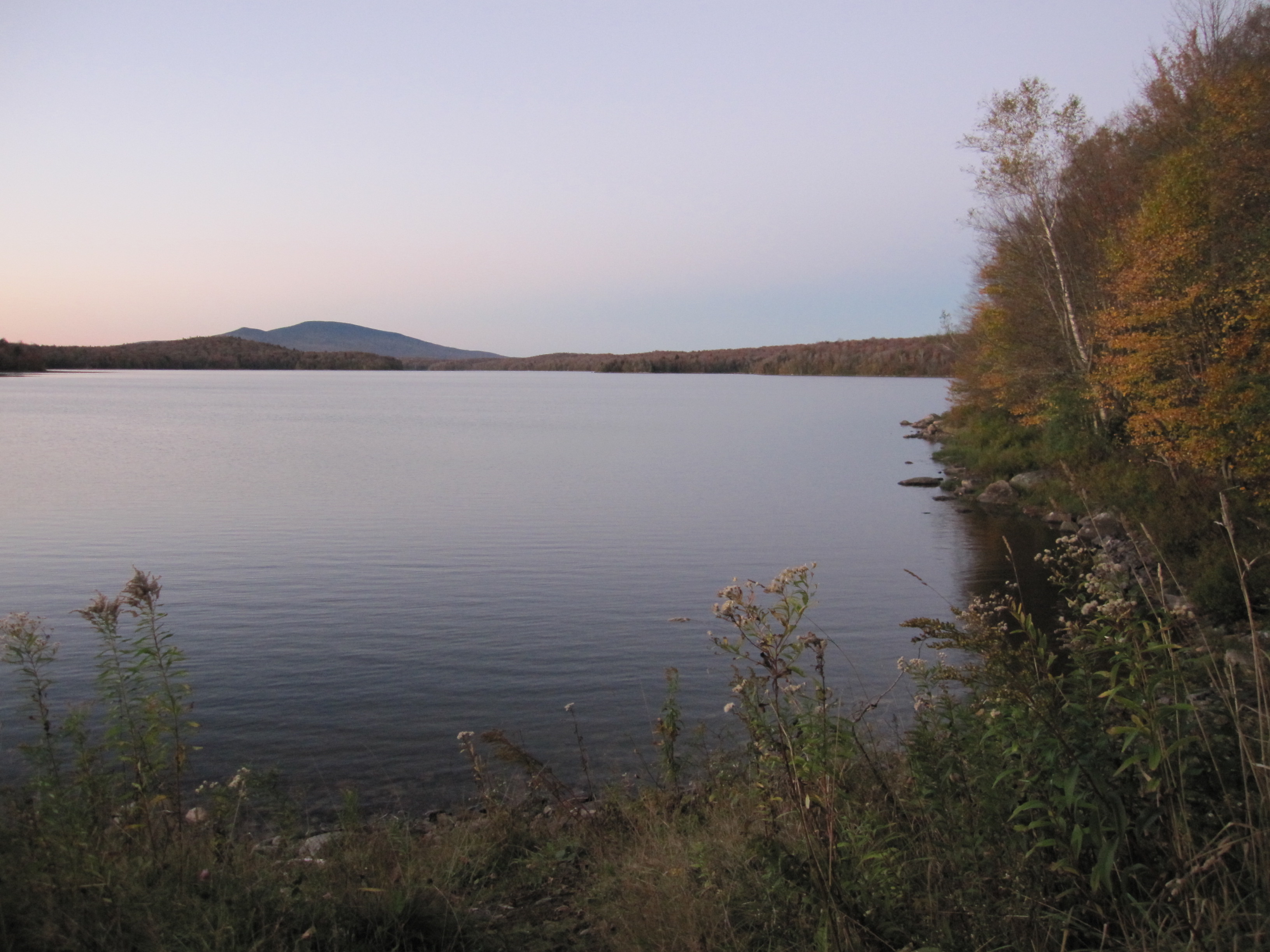
The Somerset Reservoir at sunset. Most of Somerset's land has been submerged by this artificial lake. The reservoir's dam impounds the East Branch Deerfield River.

This is an incomplete List of ghost towns in Vermont.

Name	County	Notes	Type	Founded	Town(s)
Avery's Gore	Essex County	A small gore in the Northeast Kingdom.	Township	1791	Avery's Gore
Caledonia Spring House	Caledonia County	A former spring resort. Exact location is unknown, but it was somewhere in Wheelock.	Hamlet	1830	Wheelock
Copenhagen	Caledonia County	Submerged under the Comerford Reservoir.	Village	1783(?)	Waterford
Fort Sainte Anne	Grand Isle County	The first European settlement in Vermont.	Hamlet	1666	Isle La Motte
Greenbank's Hollow	Caledonia County	A former mill town owned by Benjamin Greenbank. Site of Greenbanks Hollow Covered Bridge.	Village	1785	Danville
Glastenbury	Bennington County	An abandoned town, including the villages of Fayville and Bickford Hollow. It is located at the epicenter of the Bennington Triangle.	Town	1761	Glastenbury
Kelley Stand	Bennington County	A former hotel community near Sunderland. It was located along the Kelley Stand Road, and was meant for loggers. When logging declined, the hotel ceased to exist.	Hamlet	1840	Sunderland and Stratton
Lewis	Essex County	An uninhabited town in Essex County.	Township	1762	Lewis
Lewiston	Windsor County	Lewiston's ruins have mostly vanished due to the construction of Interstate 91. Now located in the town of Norwich.	Village	1765	Norwich
Mansfield	Chittenden County	Now in Stowe and Underhill.	Town	1763	Stowe and Underhill
Middle Hero	Grand Isle County	Middle Hero was defuncted as a town and later given the name Grand Isle.	Town	1798	Grand Isle
Mountain Mills	Windham County	A small milling community near Readsboro and Wilmington; submerged under the Harriman Reservoir.	Village	1890	Wilmington, Readsboro, and Whitingham
Ricker Basin	Washington County	Located on Ricker Mountain in Little River State Park.	Village	1816	Waterbury
Smith Family Farms	Windsor County	Birthplace of Joseph Smith, the founder of Mormonism. Located in Sharon near South Royalton.	Hamlet	1804	Sharon and Royalton
Smithfield	Franklin County	An extinct town split between Fairfield and Bakersfield.	Town	1763	Fairfield and Bakersfield
Somerset	Windham County	Mostly submerged under the Somerset Reservoir.	Town	1761	Somerset
Sterling	Lamoille County	Now located within Stowe.	Town	1782	Stowe
Two Heroes	Grand Isle County	North Hero and South Hero islands as a single grant, split apart into three towns(Middle Hero, North Hero, and South Hero).	Township	1779	South Hero, Grand Isle, and North Hero
Upper Waterford	Caledonia County	Submerged under the Moore Reservoir.	Village	1783	Waterford
Warner's Grant	Essex County	A small, uninhabited Northeast Kingdom grant.	Township	1791	Warner's Grant
Warren Gore	Essex County	An uninhabited gore.	Township	1789	Warren Gore
Wenlock	Essex County	A small hamlet and former station in Ferdinand.	Hamlet	1761	Ferdinand
West Castleton	Rutland County	Located inside Bomoseen State Park.	Village	1770	Castleton

== See also ==
List of Vermont State Historic Sites

List of municipalities in Vermont

Ompompanoosuc River

Passumpsic River
