= White Pigeon, Iowa =

Coordinates: 41.4961193°N 92.1710134°W

White Pigeon was a town in Keokuk County, Iowa.

== See also ==
- Hinkletown, Iowa
- Kinross, Iowa
