= Stowe Recreation Path =

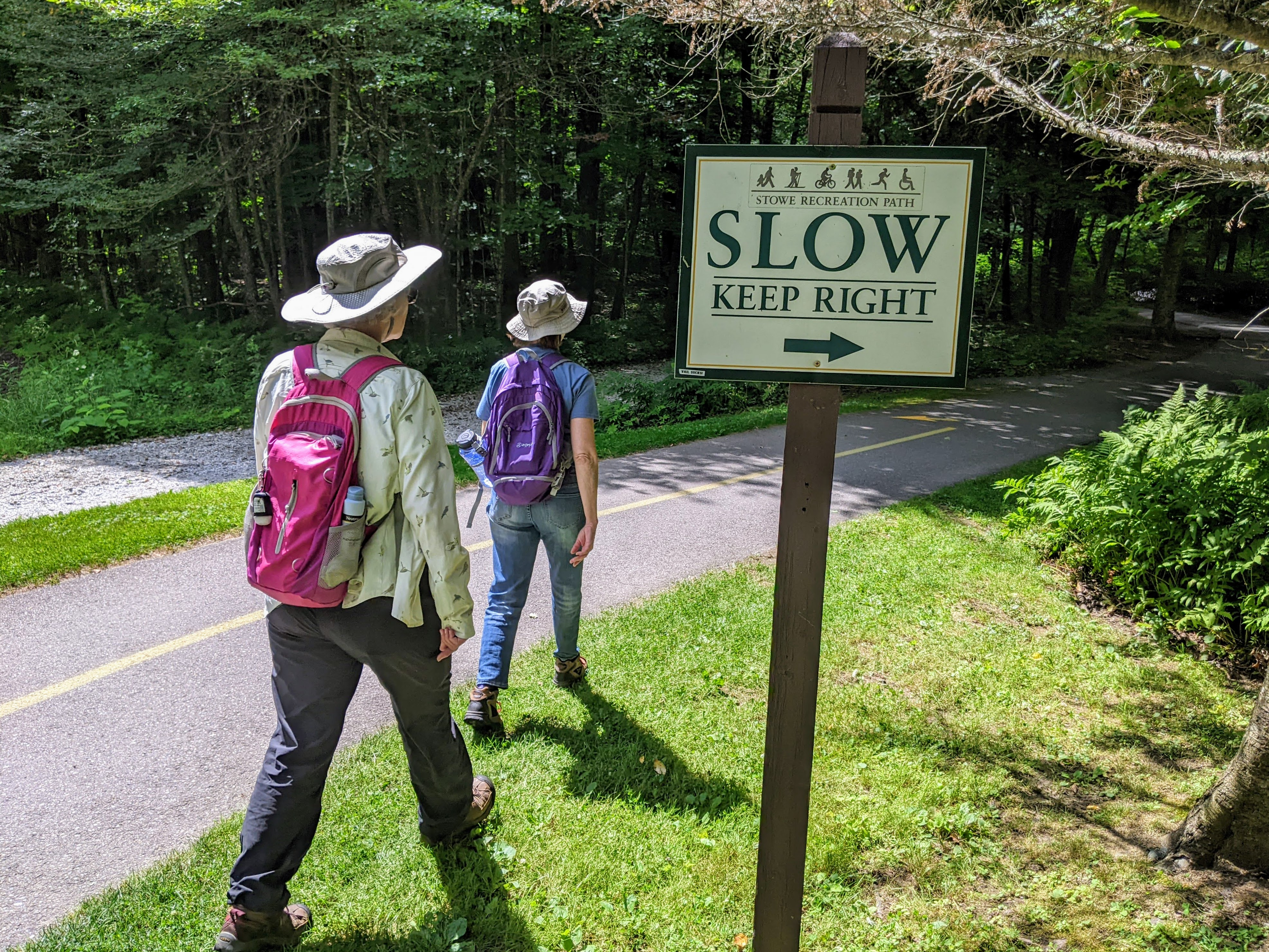
- Location: Stowe, Vermont
- Established: 1984
- Trailheads: North trailhead, Brook Road: 44.4972°N 72.74504°W Access points: Thompson Park: 44.4806°N 72.7272°W; Chase Park: 44.4736°N 72.7212°W; Cape Cod Road: 44.4735°N 72.7107°W; unnamed: 44.4728°N 72.7048°W; unnamed: 44.4688°N 72.6868°W; South trailhead, Stowe Community Church: 44.4661°N 72.6850°W
- Use: Hiking, jogging, rollerblading, cycling, snowshoeing, cross-country skiing.
- Maintainer: Stowe Town Parks Department and Friends of Rec Path Grooming
- Website: gostowe.com/listing/stowe-recreation-path/

The Stowe Recreation Path, also called the Stowe Bike Path, is a greenway located in Stowe, Vermont, United States The 5.3-mile (8.5 km) recreation trail was built in two phases, 1981–84 and 1986–89, at a total cost of US$680,000. The Stowe Recreation Path has received several awards and honors, and many people consider it a great improvement to the town.

== Beginnings ==
The planning for a recreation path in Stowe was initiated in 1964 to combat heavy traffic on the Mountain Road (Route 108). The Stowe Better Business Association voted in favor of constructing a walking path running parallel to the Mountain Road in an attempt to reduce traffic. The idea was forgotten until 13 years later.

In 1977, Claire Lintilhac commissioned the Vermont Highway Department to design a route along the Mountain Road. Plans were made, but nothing was done with them for four years. In 1981, a Bike Path Coordinator, Anne Lusk, was hired, and funds and land were acquired.

== Construction and extension ==
Between 1981 and 1984, the first 2.7 miles (4.3 km) of the 8-foot (2.4 m) wide trail were paved and 16 bridges were constructed at a cost of $300,000. Easements across the 27 different parcels of land the path crossed were donated to the town.

A 2.6-mile (4.2 km) extension to the path was constructed between 1986 and 1989 at a cost of $380,000. In addition to the fundraising techniques used for the first leg, $120,000 was solicited from the town's tax funds. Due to the popularity of the first leg, the funds were granted. This second leg crossed land owned by 4 people, mostly agricultural land and included the construction of 4 bridges. When finished, the Bike Path was 5.3 miles (8.5 km) long, and had been completed at a cost of $680,000.

== Funding ==
The $680,000 to build the path came from many sources. $186,000 came from private sources, $178,000 came from the Land and Water Conservation Funds, $134,000 came from the Lintilhac Foundation, which was started by Claire Lintilhac, $120,000 was set aside from local taxes, and $62,000 came from Revenue Sharing Funds.

The majority of the $186,000 raised privately was acquired by selling pieces of the path: an inch cost $2, a foot was $15, and a yard was $45. Many people bought these sections, and a good deal of money was raised though the Bike Path is maintained using tax money.

== Awards ==
The Stowe Recreation Path has received several awards.

- Land and Water Conservation Fund Award

The Town of Stowe is to be commended both for this highly successful project as well as for their leadership in helping other communities develop similar greenways.

- Take Pride in America Finalist Award

Out of 540 nominations from 48 states 208 finalists were chosen by the Blue Ribbon Panel of Judges. Stowe was one of two to receive this National honor for Vermont.

- Rudy Bruner Award for Urban Excellence Finalist

The project was truly a community effort: the Town of Stowe was the developer; the property owners were the planners; townspeople and visitors were members of the advisory committee.

- 1000 Points of Light by President Bush

The President today named the community of Stowe, Vermont as the 119th 'Daily Point of Light.' The Stowe Community united to preserve and enhance its environment by creating the Stowe Recreation Path and Town Greenway.

- 786th National Recreation Trail

Initiated at home, supported by State and Federal programs, and winner of numerous awards, the Stowe Recreation Path helps visitors and residents alike enjoy one of New England's - and the Nation's - most beautiful valleys.

== The Recreation Path today ==
The Stowe Recreation Path draws many tourists, both from in-state and out-of-state. The residents of Stowe and surrounding areas cooperated to fund and build the Recreation Path. The path starts behind the Community Church and ends behind Topnotch.

It is open 365 days a year and popular activities on the path are biking, inline skating, and walking in the summer, and cross-country skiing and snowshoeing in the winter.
