= List of ghost towns in Iowa =

This is an incomplete List of ghost towns in Iowa.

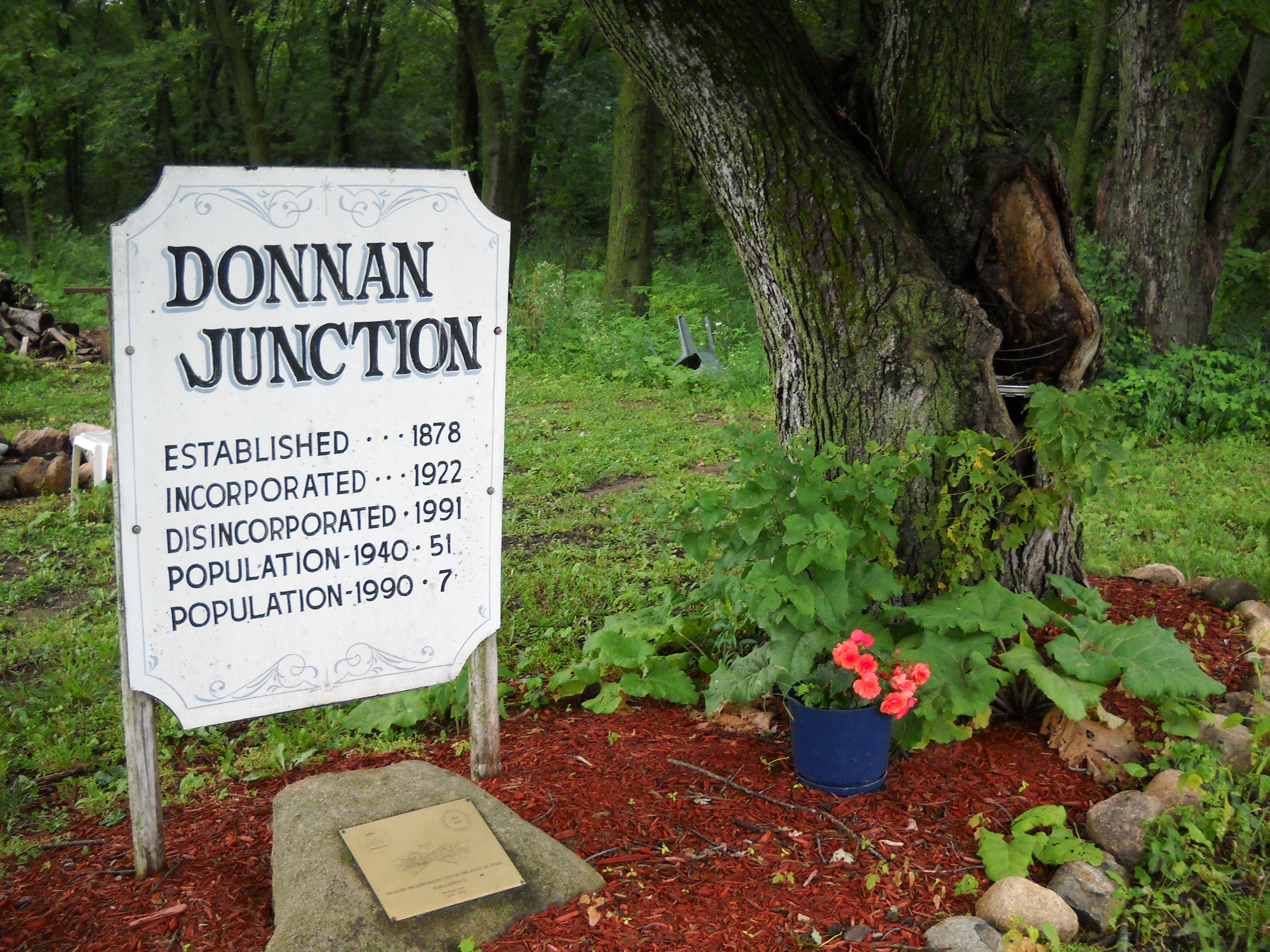
Donnan, Iowa memorial sign, showing the former location of the City of Donnan

== Ghost towns ==
Town name	Other name(s)	County	Established	Disestablished	Remarks
Big Spring		Wayne			
Bryantsburg		Buchanan			
Buxton		Monroe			
Buchanan		Cedar			
Buckhorn		Jackson			
Caledonia		Ringgold			
Carrollton		Carroll			
Civil Bend		Fremont			
Clarkson		Warren			
Coalport		Marion			Submerged by Lake Red Rock.
Conover		Winneshiek			
Cordova		Marion			Submerged by Lake Red Rock.
Donnan		Fayette		1990s	
Doris		Buchanan			
Dudley		Polk			
Dudley		Wapello			
Dunreath		Marion			Submerged by Lake Red Rock.
Elkport		Clayton			
Fifield		Marion			Submerged by Lake Red Rock.
Herring		Sac			
Hinkletown		Keokuk			
Howell		Marion			
Green Island		Jackson			
Griffinsville		Appanoose			
Iowaville		Van Buren			
Ivanhoe		Linn			
Knowlton		Ringgold			
Lakewood		Lyon			
Littleport		Clayton			
Lucky Valley		Woodbury			
Midway		Johnson			
Motor		Clayton			
Morrisburg		Guthrie			
Mount Etna		Adams			
Mount Pisgah		Union			Mitt Romney's great-grandfather, Helaman Pratt was born near Mount Pisgah.
National		Jackson			
Oradell		Marion			
Percy		Marion			
Queen City		Adams			
Red Rock		Marion			Submerged by Lake Red Rock.
River Junction	Stumptown, Stumpville, Stumpy	Johnson			
Rockville		Delaware			
Rousseau		Marion			Submerged by Lake Red Rock.
Shady Grove		Buchanan			
Siegel		Bremer			
Stanzel		Adair			
Stiles		Davis			
Strahan		Mills			
Sunbury		Cedar			
Unique		Humboldt			
White Pigeon		Keokuk			
Yatton		Washington			
