= List of ghost towns in Delaware =

This is an incomplete list of ghost towns in Delaware.

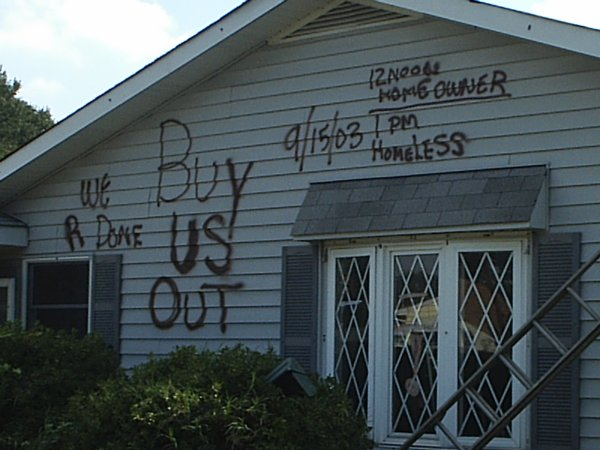
A destroyed Glenville, Delaware home, two weeks after Hurricane Isabel impacted Delaware (photo taken October 2, 2003)

== Ghost towns ==
Town name	Other name(s)	County	Established	Disestablished	Remarks
Banning		Sussex			
Glenville		New Castle			Never recovered from the damage caused by Tropical Storm Henri in 2003 and was abandoned by 2004.
New Market		Sussex			
Owens Station		Sussex			
Saint Johnstown		Sussex			
Woodland		Sussex			
Woodland Beach		Kent			
Zwaanendael	Swaanendael, Zwaanendael Colony, Swaanendael Colony	Sussex			First settlement in the state

== See also ==
- Queen Anne's Railroad
