= Sterling, Vermont =

Former town in Vermont, U.S.

- former Town
- Sterling, depicted on an 1814 map

Sterling is a former town in Vermont, US. Formed in the early days of English-speaking settlement in northern Vermont, the town was only marginally settled; it was later disincorporated and its land divided among four adjoining towns.

== History ==
The Town of Sterling was chartered February 25, 1782. The origin of the town's name has been lost. The town was formed and its boundaries were set before its settlers arrived. It was located in Chittenden County until Lamoille County was formed. When settled, it proved to be largely mountainous and unsuitable for agriculture. Eleven families were represented at the first town meeting in 1806, and the population grew to 181 by the 1820 census. Sterling became a mill town, but the population peaked at 233.

The first division of the town was made October 30, 1828, when, by an act of the state legislature, a strip of two miles in the western portion of the town, which included Smuggler's Notch, was transferred to neighboring Cambridge. On November 14, 1855, the remainder of the town was divided (after a 40-10 vote of the citizenry) between and annexed to Johnson, Morristown, and Stowe. Nearby Mansfield suffered a similar fate. Upon annexation, Sterling surrendered its organization, and all its records were left in the Morristown archives.

The village of Sterling was gradually abandoned, with the process completed in the mid-20th century. Only a few cellar holes remain. The name of the town is preserved in a few place names, such as Sterling Mountain, Sterling Brook, and Sterling Valley Road.
