= Moscow, Vermont =

Human settlement in Stowe, Vermont, United States of America

Coordinates: 44°26′29″N 72°42′55″W

Moscow is an unincorporated community in the town of Stowe in Lamoille County, Vermont, United States.
