= Mansfield, Vermont =

Former town in Vermont, U.S.

- former Town
- Mansfield, depicted on an 1814 map

Mansfield is a former town in Vermont, U.S.A. Formed in the early days of English-speaking settlement in northern Vermont, the town was only marginally settled and was later disincorporated and its land divided between adjoining towns. Mount Mansfield, the highest mountain in Vermont, was named for the town.

== Name ==
The source of the town's name is the subject of some dispute. Several of the original grantees of the land in Mansfield town were from Mansfield, Connecticut, which in turn is known to have been named for Moses Mansfield, one of the chief landowners there. Alternatively, the town may have been named for a chief justice of England, Lord Mansfield, who was among the British officials who in 1752 had ruled that the land between the Connecticut River and Lake Champlain (present-day Vermont) would be part of the royal province of New Hampshire, and not of New York, which also claimed that territory.

As in many Vermont towns, the most prominent mountain within its borders was given the town's name (cf. Elmore Mountain, Mt. Worcester, and Jay Peak). The name remained after the town was disincorporated, and the highest mountain in Vermont is still named Mount Mansfield.

== History ==
The Town of Mansfield was chartered June 8, 1783, before anyone involved had visited the site; when the townsite was surveyed, it was discovered to be mostly mountainside. Although a few hardy pioneers settled in the town's few lowlands, the town was dissolved by degrees, with the portion generally west of the mountain being annexed to Underhill in 1839, the eastern portion to Stowe in 1848 after a vote of the citizenry. The dividing line does not run precisely along the ridge of the mountain. Nearby Sterling suffered a similar fate.
