= List of ghost towns in Connecticut =

This is an incomplete list of ghost towns in the U.S. state of Connecticut.

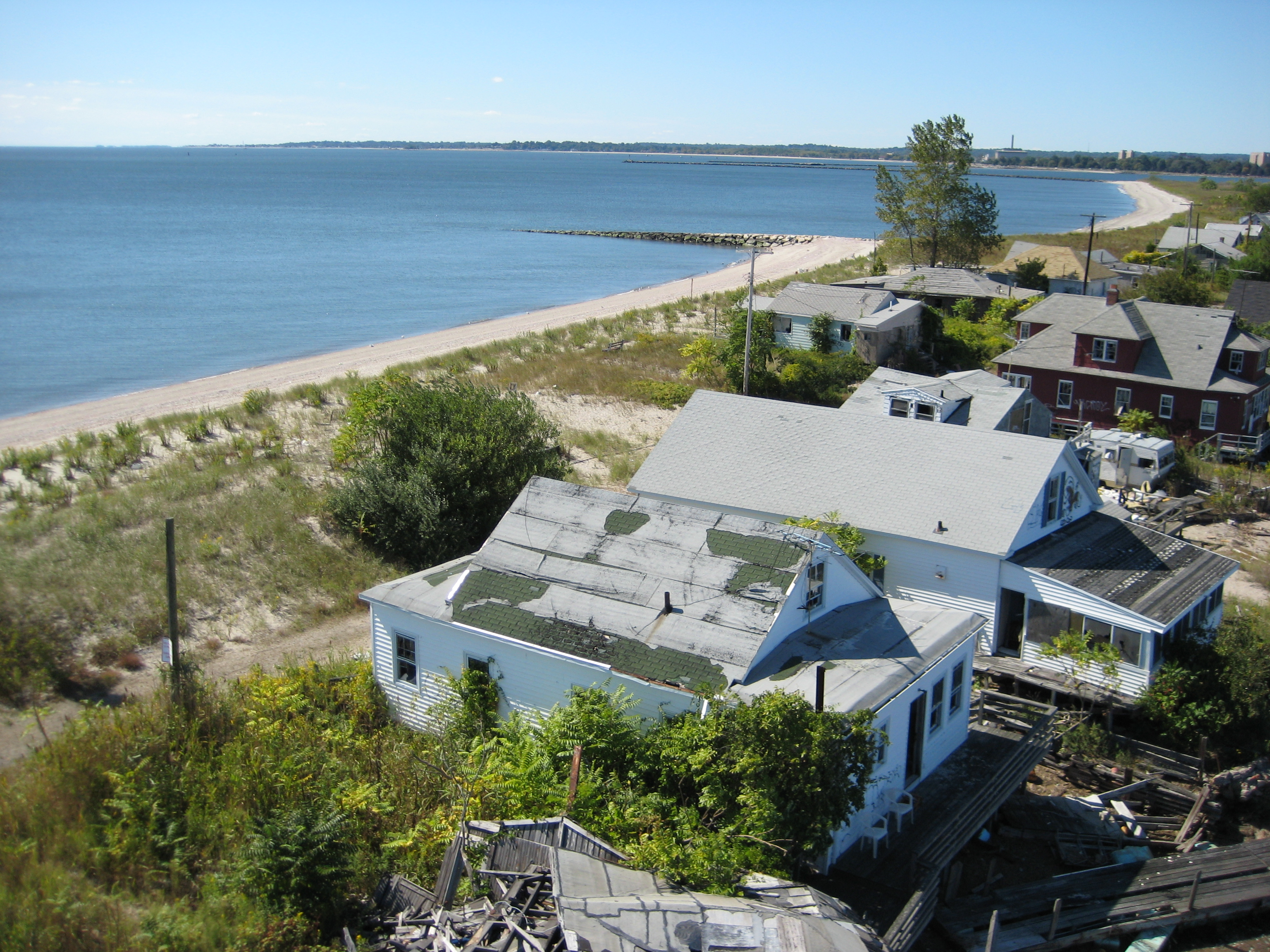
An aerial view (from a kite) of Pleasure Beach, Connecticut

== Ghost towns ==
Town name	Other name(s)	County	Established	Disestablished	Refs
Bara-Hack		Windham			
Dudleytown		Litchfield			
Gay City	Now a state park	Tolland			
Johnsonville Village		Middlesex			
Pleasure Beach		Fairfield			
