= Pleasure Beach =

Ghost town in Connecticut, United States

Coordinates: 41.16100°N 73.1680°W

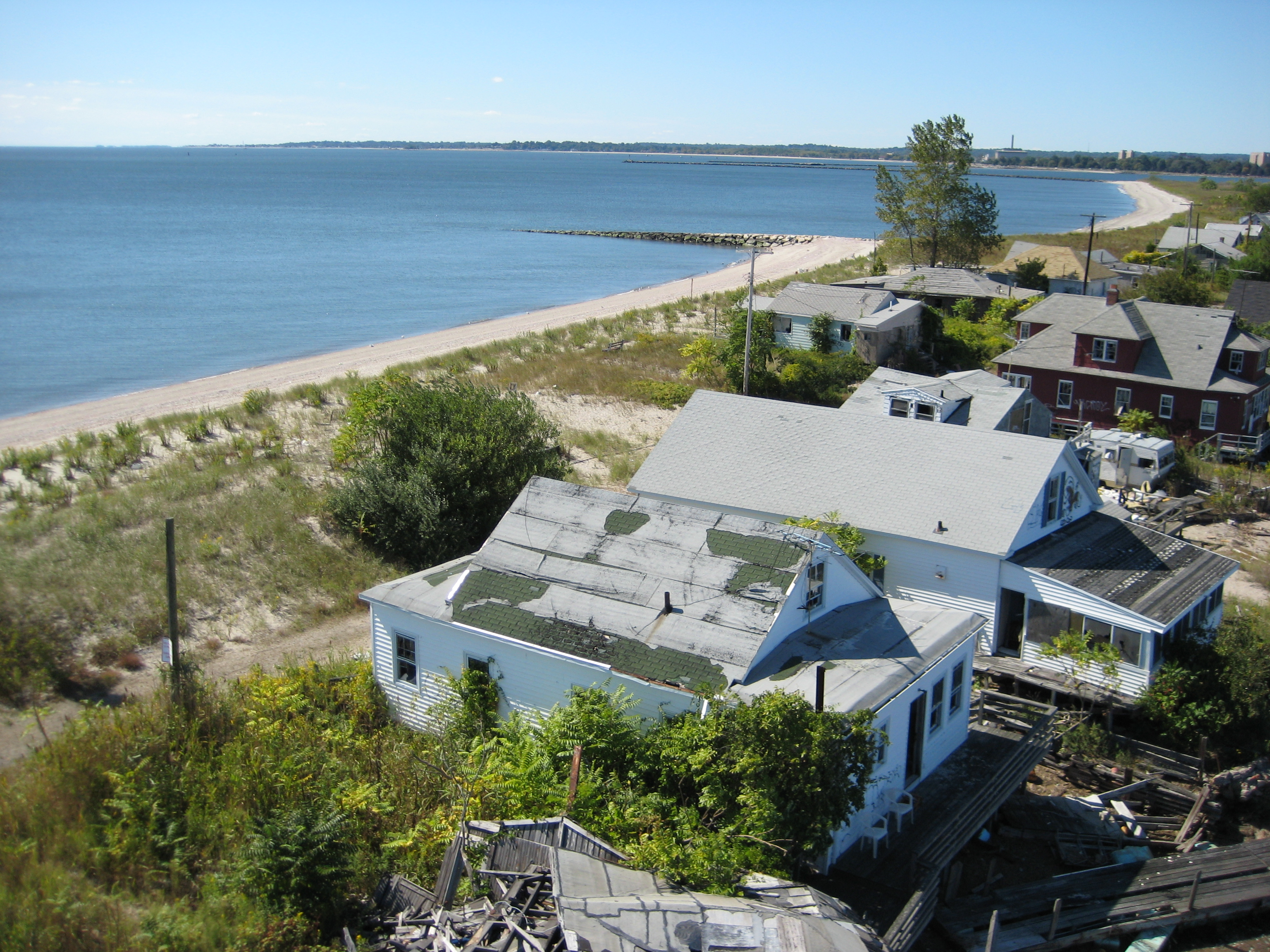
An aerial view (from a kite) of Pleasure Beach

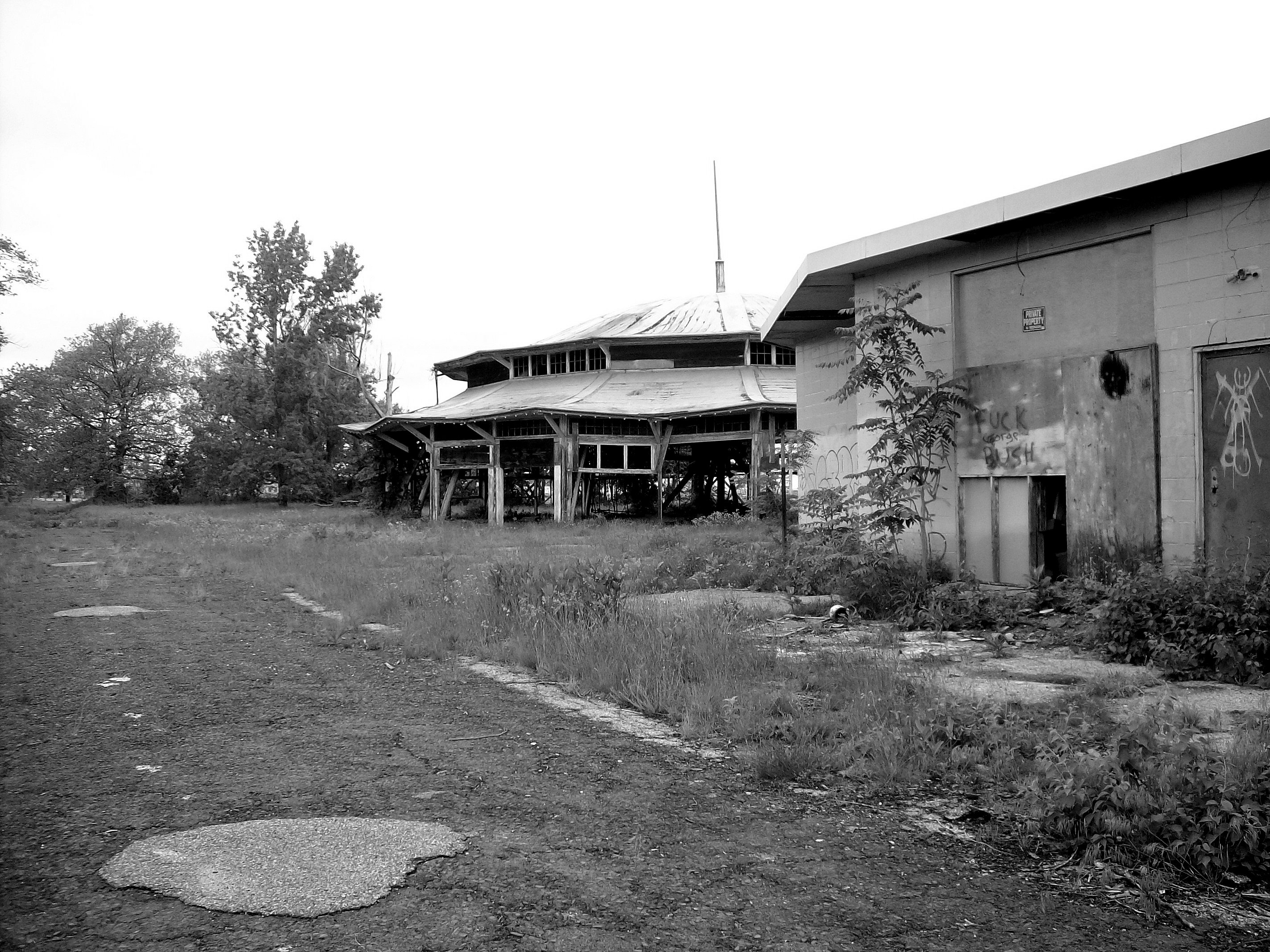
A view of the carousel that was part of the original amusement park at Pleasure Beach

Pleasure Beach is the Bridgeport portion of a Connecticut barrier beach that extends 2.5 miles (4 km) westerly from Point No Point (the portion in the adjoining town of Stratford is known as Long Beach). Prior to June, 2014, when Pleasure Beach re-opened, the area was Connecticut's largest and most recent ghost town after it was abandoned in the late 1990s due to a fire on the bridge connecting it to the mainland. It is surrounded on three sides by water (Lewis Gut to the north, Bridgeport Harbor to the west, and Long Island Sound to the south).

== History ==
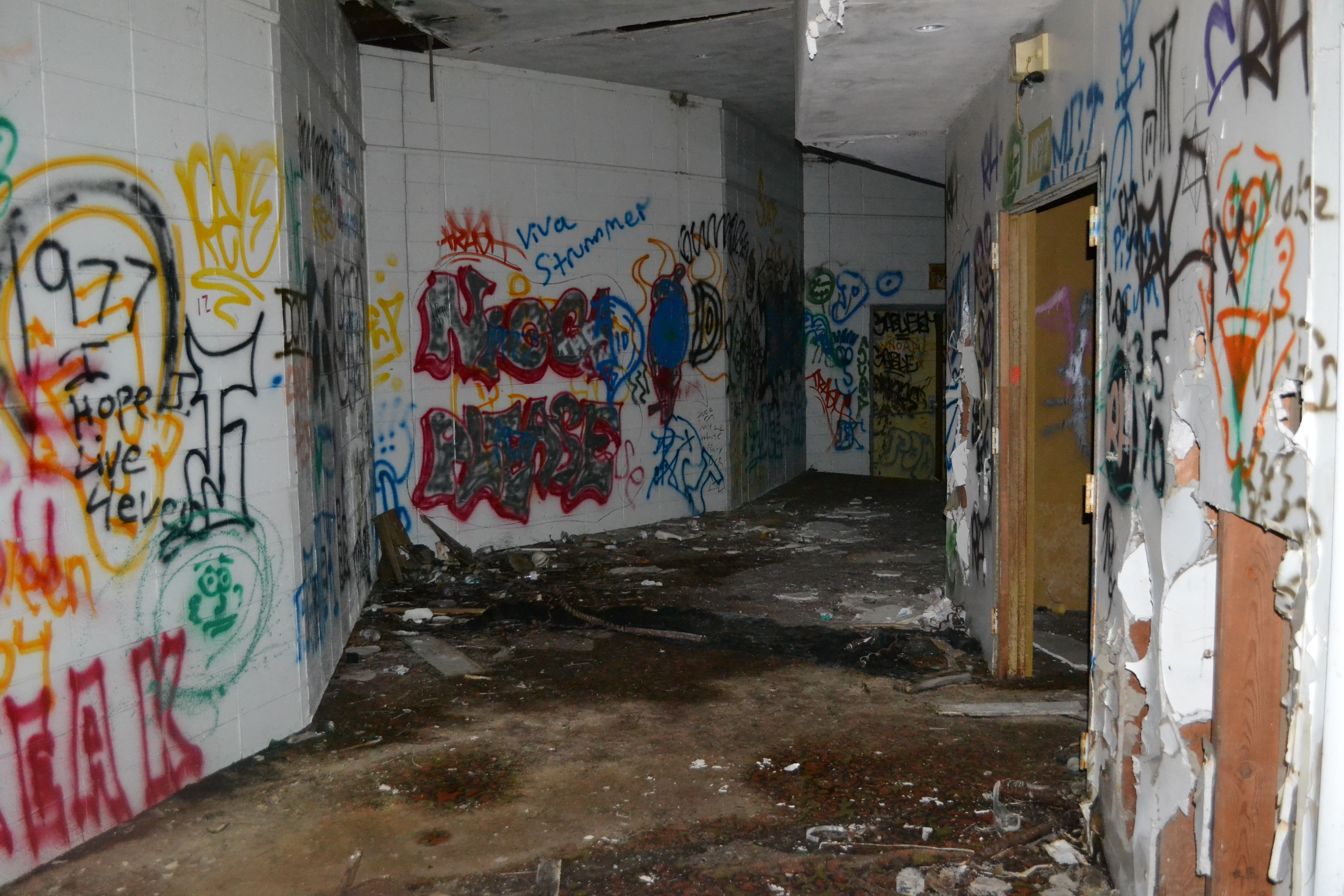
View of the rear hallway of the theater (2019)

From 1892 until 1958, it was home to a popular amusement park of the same name. From 1904 to 1919, it was called "Steeplechase Island." The amusement park was accessible primarily by ferry service and a wooden swing bridge built in 1927 to carry automobiles and pedestrians. Remaining structures from the amusement park are the carousel, dodge-'em car enclosure, and beer garden (the latter was substantially altered for use as a summer theater in the 1960s).

After a portion of the bridge burned in 1996, Pleasure Beach was cut off and became accessible only by a lengthy trek along the shoreline, or by small private boats from the mainland. This severely limited access and allowed nature to be undisturbed. As late as December 2008, Bridgeport considered a ferry service to relink the beach with the city, but this was rejected due to parking considerations and the need for a Coast Guard registered captain.

As of June 2014, Pleasure Beach has re-opened. From the city of Bridgeport's website: "The peninsula will be accessible seven days a week via free water taxi, which will pick beach goers up at the fishing pier located on Seaview Avenue near its intersection with Central Avenue.

"Two water taxis—the 23 passenger Lewis H. Latimer and the 18 passenger Gustave Whitehead—will run frequently from the fishing pier on Seaview Avenue to the T-Pier on Pleasure Beach.

"Upon arrival on the T-Pier on Pleasure Beach, it's about a half-mile walk along a boardwalk to the beach area. While en route, visitors will pass an info depot where beach goers will be able to ask questions and gain more information about the park.

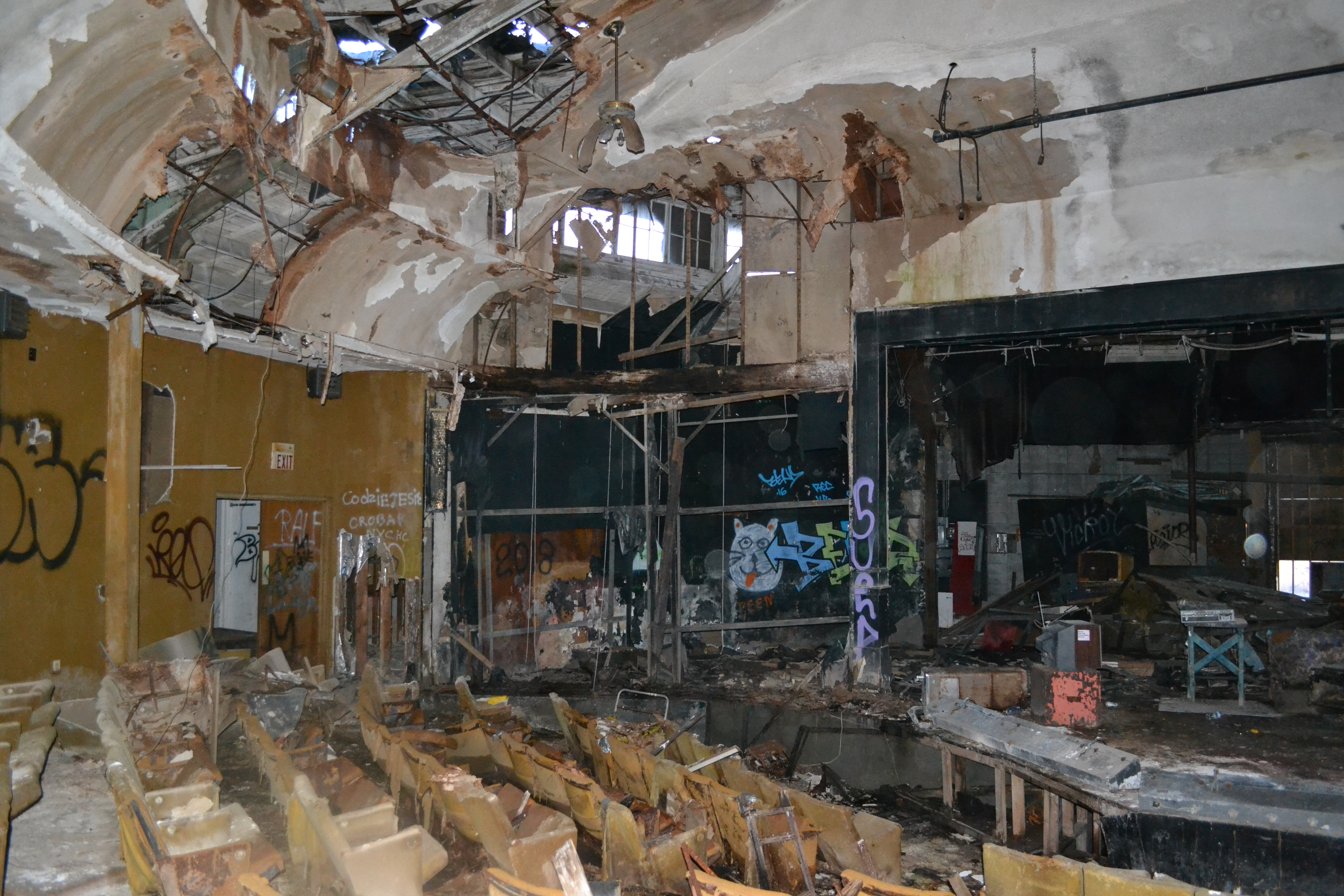
View of the main theater hall (2019)

"After passing the info depot, visitors will come upon a pavilion and relaxation area that includes several bathrooms, showers, picnic tables and a limited concession stand. And, after walking through the pavilion area, beach goers will walk down a boardwalk and onto the beautiful beach."

The Town of Stratford owned 45 cottages on the Long Beach portion of the peninsula. For a decade, the town considered ending the leases of the seasonal homes, in part because of difficulties in protecting them. The town ended renewal of leases, and in May 2007, the remaining occupants agreed to give up their claims and moved their possessions away by barge. The cottages have since been demolished.

=== Recent Timeline ===
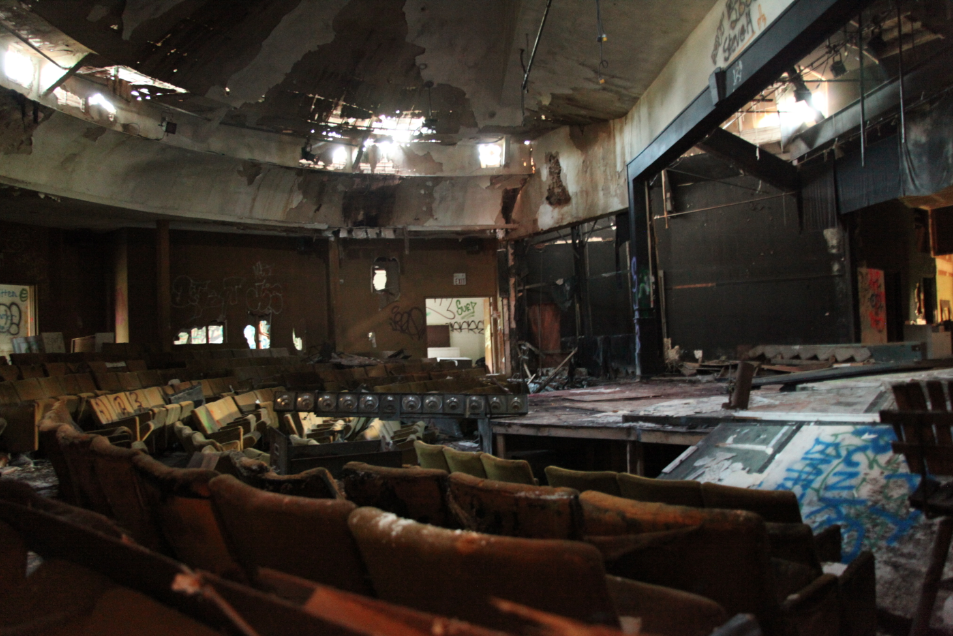
The abandoned community theater is one of the few buildings that remain on the peninsula (shown here as it stands August 2012).

- As of July 2008, three of the 45 cottages had suffered arson attacks and burned completely, and every building located on Pleasure Beach has suffered vandalism. Four vehicles have been removed, and the area is littered with trash from squatters and party-goers. The mayor of Stratford is working to clean the land and possible transactions exist to sell the Long Beach land to the U.S. Fish and Wildlife Service.
- On July 25, 2008, then-governor of Connecticut, M. Jodi Rell, endorsed spending $150,000.00 to study the feasibility of restoring access to Pleasure Beach, possibly by rebuilding the bridge.
- As of March 15, 2009, five more of the cottages have fallen victim to arson.
- A report on July 2, 2009 on Fox News Channel revealed that there were no longer any residents on Pleasure Beach.
- As of September 3, 2009, the Connecticut Post reported that an unauthorized demolition took place on Pleasure Beach. The carousel, bumper car area, and a bandstand were all demolished without permission or permit. The remains of these areas remain on the beach. The mayors of Stratford and Bridgeport are investigating.
- As of March 3, 2010, a temporary road has been built down the stretch of beach to the cottages. Workers will remove as much debris as possible before March 15, when they must halt the process due to piping plovers returning to their habitat. The work will resume September 15, 2010 and continue until all cottages and debris have been removed.
- As of May 2011, all of the cottages have been demolished, leaving only beach behind. The park infrastructure remains, such as the theater and other formerly public buildings.
- On June 28, 2014, Pleasure Beach reopened to the public. The peninsula is accessible seven days a week via free water taxi located at the fishing pier on Seaview Ave. near Central Ave. in Bridgeport. The beach includes a pavilion and relaxation area with several bathrooms, showers, picnic tables, and a limited concession stand.

== Nature ==
Pleasure Beach is a protected refuge for endangered birds (piping plover, osprey) and plants (prickly pear cactus, southern sea lavender). Sections of the beach are roped off seasonally to protect the plover nesting areas. There is also an abundance of cotton-tailed rabbits, deer, foxes, raccoons, and other mammals. The sand spit is estimated to contain more than 25% of the remaining undeveloped beachfront in the state.

== Notable structures ==
The transmitter towers for radio station WICC (AM) are located on Pleasure Beach. The station uses an amphibious landing craft when it needs to deliver cargo.

== See also ==
- History of Bridgeport, Connecticut
- Stewart B. McKinney National Wildlife Refuge
- List of ghost towns in Connecticut
