= Kinross, Iowa =

- City
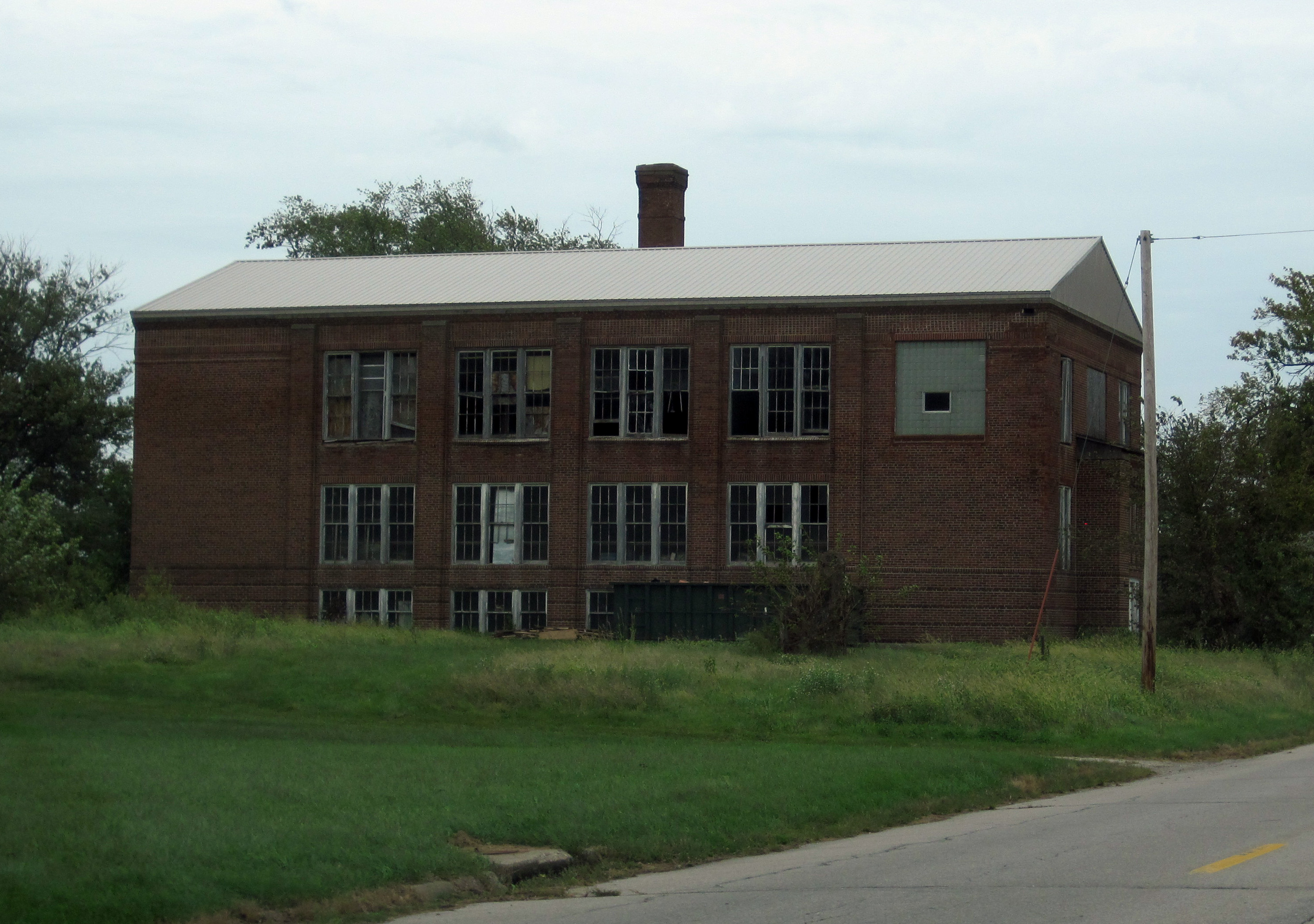
- Former school

- Location of Kinross, Iowa
- Coordinates: 41°27′33″N 91°59′14″W
- Country: United States
- State: Iowa
- County: Keokuk

Area
  - Total: 0.19 sq mi (0.49 km^{2})
  - Land: 0.19 sq mi (0.49 km^{2})
  - Water: 0 sq mi (0.00 km^{2})
- Elevation: 794 ft (242 m)

Population (2020)
  - Total: 80
  - Density: 423.6/sq mi (163.55/km^{2})
- Time zone: UTC-6 (Central (CST))
  - Summer (DST): UTC-5 (CDT)
- ZIP code: 52335
- Area code: 319
- FIPS code: 19-41475
- GNIS feature ID: 2395544
- Website: kinrossia.org

Kinross is a city in Keokuk County, Iowa, United States. The population was 80 at the time of the 2020 census. The community is named after Kinross in Scotland.

== History ==
Kinross was created by people moving to be close to a new railroad depot in 1879 by moving both houses and businesses. This move, along with other departures, effectively turned their prior community, Hinkletown, Iowa, into a ghost town.

== Geography ==
Kinross is located southwest of Iowa City.

According to the United States Census Bureau, the city has a total area of 0.20 square miles (0.52 km^{2}), all of it land.

== Demographics ==
Historical populations
Year	Pop.	±%
1900	132	—
1910	142	+7.6%
1920	138	−2.8%
1930	137	−0.7%
1940	109	−20.4%
1950	105	−3.7%
1960	103	−1.9%
1970	98	−4.9%
1980	79	−19.4%
1990	89	+12.7%
2000	80	−10.1%
2010	73	−8.8%
2020	80	+9.6%
Source:"U.S. Census website". United States Census Bureau. and Iowa Data Center; Source: U.S. Decennial Census

=== 2020 census ===
As of the census of 2020, there were 80 people, 24 households, and 17 families residing in the city. The population density was 423.6 inhabitants per square mile (163.6/km^{2}). There were 30 housing units at an average density of 158.9 per square mile (61.3/km^{2}). The racial makeup of the city was 90.0% White, 0.0% Black or African American, 0.0% Native American, 1.2% Asian, 0.0% Pacific Islander, 0.0% from other races and 8.8% from two or more races. Hispanic or Latino persons of any race comprised 1.2% of the population.

Of the 24 households, 41.7% of which had children under the age of 18 living with them, 45.8% were married couples living together, 16.7% were cohabitating couples, 20.8% had a female householder with no spouse or partner present and 16.7% had a male householder with no spouse or partner present. 29.2% of all households were non-families. 29.2% of all households were made up of individuals, 20.8% had someone living alone who was 65 years old or older.

The median age in the city was 34.3 years. 33.8% of the residents were under the age of 20; 2.5% were between the ages of 20 and 24; 25.0% were from 25 and 44; 23.8% were from 45 and 64; and 15.0% were 65 years of age or older. The gender makeup of the city was 51.2% male and 48.8% female.

=== 2010 census ===
At the 2010 census, there were 73 people, 32 households and 19 families living in the city. The population density was 365.0 per square mile (140.9/km^{2}). There were 37 housing units at an average density of 185.0 per square mile (71.4/km^{2}). The racial make-up was 100.0% White.

There were 32 households, of which 28.1% had children under the age of 18 living with them, 46.9% were married couples living together, 9.4% had a female householder with no husband present, 3.1% had a male householder with no wife present, and 40.6% were non-families. 37.5% of all households were made up of individuals, and 12.5% had someone living alone who was 65 years of age or older. The average household size was 2.28 and the average family size was 3.11.

The median age was 44.5 years. 24.7% of residents were under the age of 18; 9.5% were between the ages of 18 and 24; 16.4% were from 25 to 44; 41.1% were from 45 to 64; and 8.2% were 65 years of age or older. The gender make-up was 53.4% male and 46.6% female.

=== 2000 census ===
At the 2000 census. there were 80 people, 31 households and 18 families living in the city. The population density was 416.5 per square mile (160.8/km^{2}). There were 39 housing units at an average density of 203.1 per square mile (78.4/km^{2}). The racial make-up was 100.00% White.

There were 31 households, of which 32.3% had children under the age of 18 living with them, 54.8% were married couples living together, 3.2% had a female householder with no husband present, and 41.9% were non-families. 29.0% of all households were made up of individuals, and 6.5% had someone living alone who was 65 years of age or older. The average household size was 2.58 and the average family size was 3.33.

32.5% were under the age of 18, 6.3% from 18 to 24, 31.3% from 25 to 44, 21.3% from 45 to 64, and 8.8% who were 65 years of age or older. The median age was 36 years. For every 100 females, there were 110.5 males. For every 100 females age 18 and over, there were 92.9 males.

The median household income was $31,563 and the median family income as $33,750. Males had a median income of $20,833 and females $18,750. The per capita income was $12,625. 14.3% of families and 11.7% of the population were living below the poverty line, including no under eighteens and none of those over 64.

== Education ==
Kinross is within the English Valleys Community School District.
