= Bara-Hack, Connecticut =

Coordinates: 41.8800°N 72.0110°W

Bara-Hack is a former village in the town of Pomfret, Connecticut.

== History ==
Bara-Hack was settled in 1778 by Johnathan Randall Esq. and Obediah Higinbotham, two colonists of English ancestry. They and their families fled the Randall homestead and farm, situated on the coast of Cranston, Rhode Island, after the British advances of the Battle of Rhode Island of 1778 deemed it too dangerous for them to stay. They settled on land in Pomfret, Connecticut previously purchased by Randall in 1776, and there they built their homes, farms and livelihoods, including a water wheel-powered mill, a business which produced spinning wheels for the production of textiles, and a small burial ground that would be shared by individual members of both families.

Myths and legends have long been attached to not only the settlement itself, but its original inhabitants as well. Even the place names that it's generally referred to are questionable, as it never attained the size or scope of what could be defined as a village (even hamlet might be a stretch), and Bara Hack, a Welsh term that is loosely translated as “the breaking of bread”, is likely to be that of 20th century manufacture, and has been primarily attributed to the writings of Odell Shepherd. The community was abandoned by 1890, possibly some time after the Civil War.

Obediah Higinbotham was born in 1750 in Lancashire County, England.

== Today ==
Bara-Hack is currently on private property. Allegedly closed to the public after large numbers of Ghost hunters were trespassing on the property. The majority of the former fields and streets of Bara-Hack have been overgrown by forest. And only the stone foundations remain from the houses and farms. The cemetery is still intact.
