= Kelley Stand Road =

Road in Vermont, United States

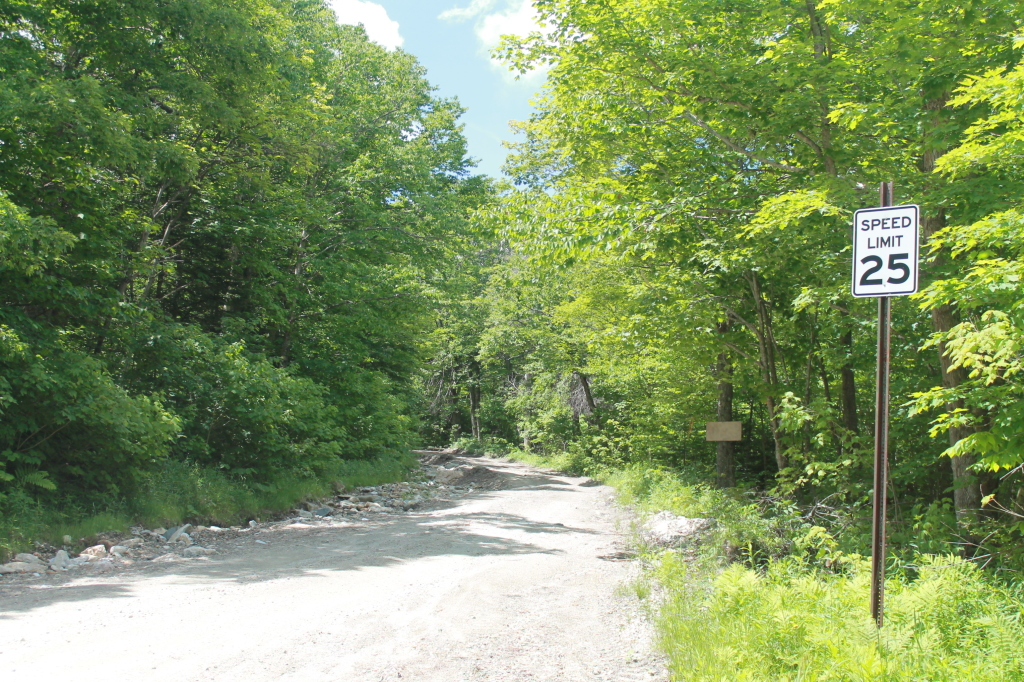
A section of the road in 2012

Kelley Stand Road is an unpaved road running between East Arlington and Stratton, Vermont, in southern Vermont. It travels over a high plateau adjacent to the Lye Brook Wilderness in the Green Mountain National Forest (GMNF). The road originally served numerous logging camps and early settlements during the nineteenth century. From Stratton, the road continues eastward to West Wardsboro as a paved, year-round road. The western portion is dirt and not plowed or maintained during winter months.

== History ==
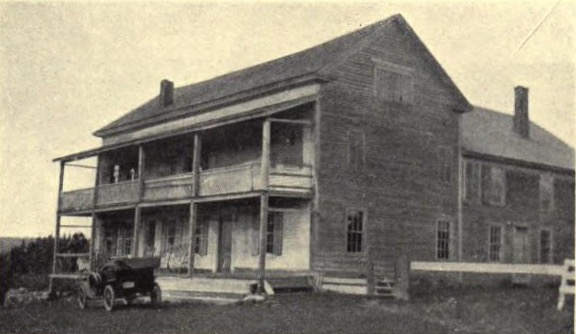
Kelley Stand circa 1913

The road is named for the Kelley Stand, an "old-time tavern", which was still in operation along the route circa 1913. Kelley Stand Road is notable as the site of Daniel Webster's famous Kelley Stand speech of July 1840; a historic marker commemorates the spot. The road is near the location near where Benton MacKaye first conceived his idea of a hiking trail that ran along the Appalachian Mountain range of the eastern United States.

== Appalachian Trail and Long Trail ==
The Appalachian Trail (AT), and likewise the Long Trail (LT), which share the same path in the southern Green Mountains of Vermont, cross Kelley Stand Road before the trail crosses over the summit of Stratton Mountain, which lies to the north of the road. Overnight AT/LT trailhead parking is available on the road, which also serves as an access point for other nearby trails.

Northbound from Kelley Stand Road the next AT/LT shelter is the Stratton Pond shelter at AT mile point 1625, and to the south lies the Story Spring AT/LT shelter at mile point 1615.

== Damage from Tropical Storm Irene ==
On August 28, 2011, Tropical Storm Irene caused major damage to the road. Until scheduled repairs were made by the US Forest Service, it remained inaccessible from the Arlington side. Destinations could still be reached from the Stratton side. In September 2014, Kelley Stand Road was completely reopened from the Arlington side, after three years of reconstruction costing $3.8 million.
