= Stowe Community Church =

Historic church in Vermont, United States

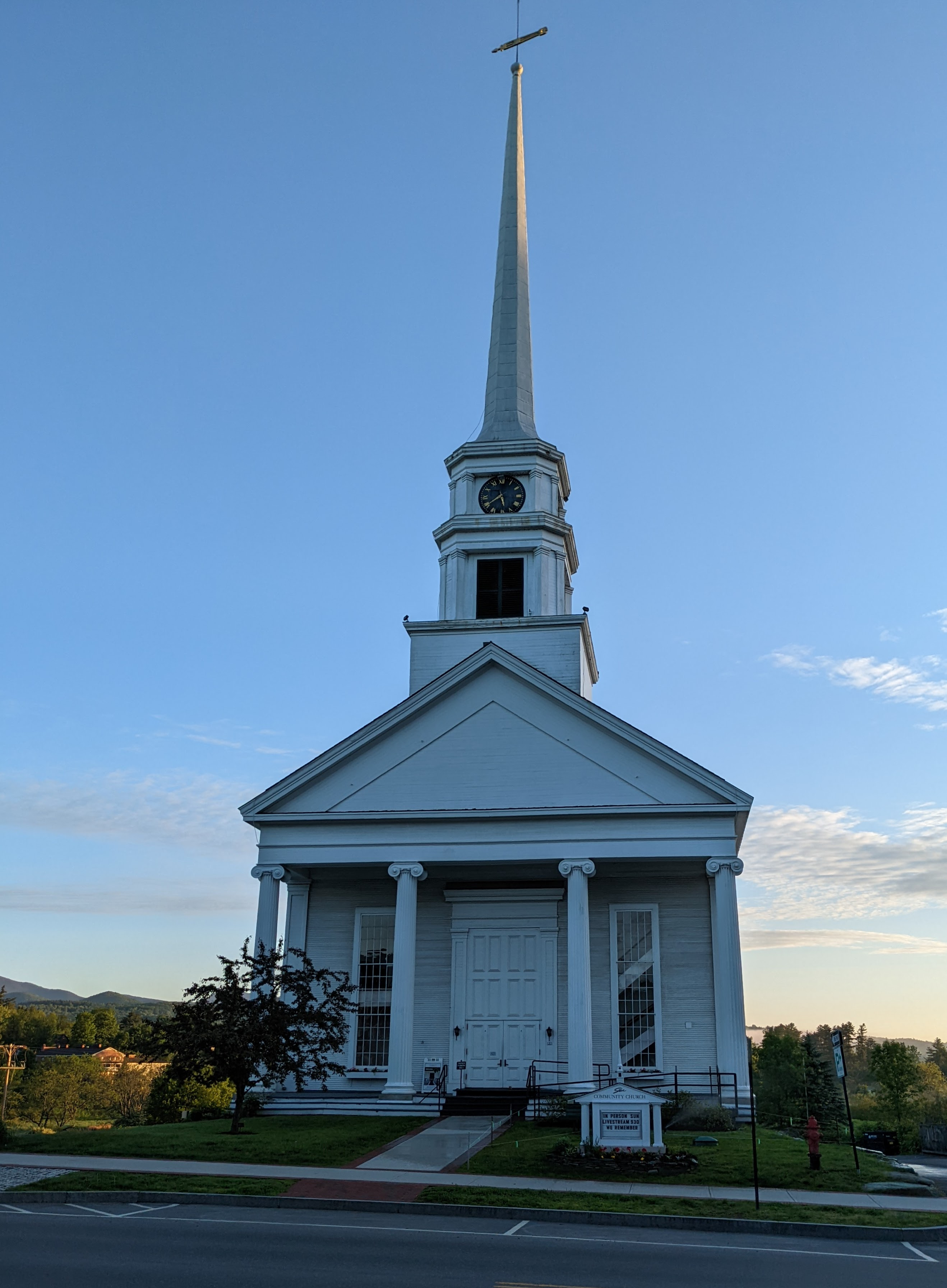
- Pictured in 2022
- Stowe Community Church
- 44.46567°N 72.68467°W
- Location: 137 Main Street, Stowe, Vermont
- Country: United States
- Denomination: Non-denominational
- Website: https://www.stowecommunitychurch.org/

Architecture
- Functional status: Active
- Architectural type: New England colonial architecture
- Completed: 1863 (163 years ago)

Stowe Community Church stands on Main Street (Vermont Route 100) in Stowe, Vermont, United States. Completed in 1863, and standing opposite School Street, it is one of the most photographed churches in the country. Its current congregation was formed after the uniting of the local Baptists, Congregationalists, Methodists and Universalists in 1918, making it a non-denominational church.

A year after the church was completed, an organ in the W. B. Simmons style was purchased in Boston and installed in the balcony.

After the unification of the congregations, the Universalists' parsonage was retained as the residence of the church's minister.

The church's 75-foot (23 m)-tall spire was removed for repair in October 2024. It was reinstalled the following April.

As of 2025, the church's pastor is Dan Haugh.

== Gallery ==
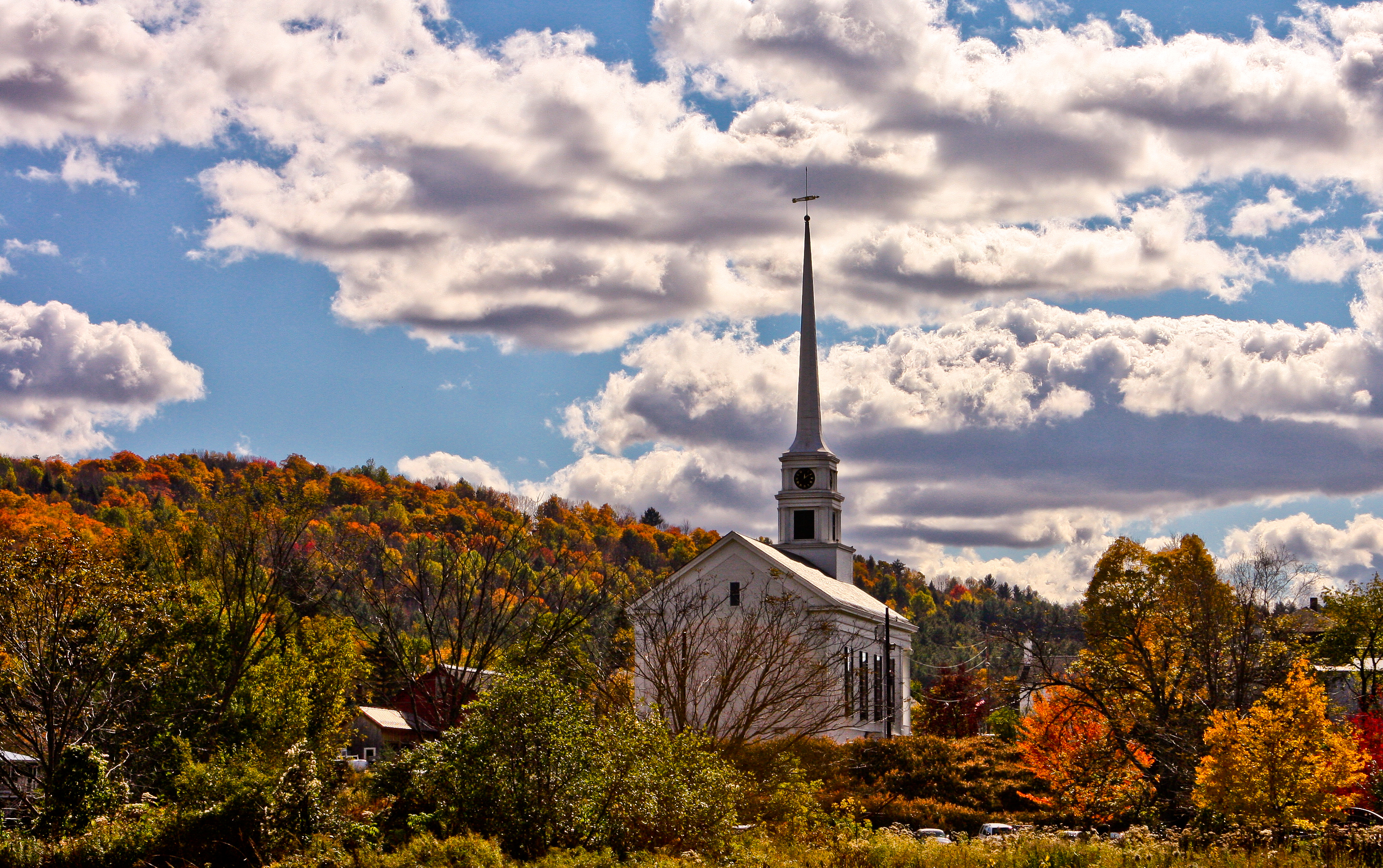
The church is commonly photographed from the northwest, allowing the fall foliage to be a backdrop
