= Glenville, Delaware =

Ghost town in Delaware, United States

- Unincorporated community
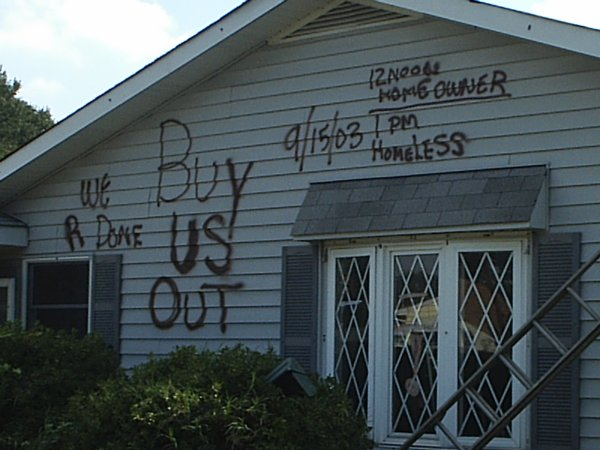
- A destroyed Glenville home on October 2, 2003, two weeks after Tropical Storm Henri flooded the subdivision

- Location within Delaware Location within the United States
- Coordinates: 39°42′45″N 75°38′24″W
- Country: United States
- State: Delaware
- County: New Castle
- Abandoned: 2004
- Elevation: 20 ft (6.1 m)

Population
  - Total: 0
- Time zone: UTC-5 (Eastern (EST))
  - Summer (DST): UTC-4 (EDT)
- Area code: 302
- GNIS feature ID: 216920

Glenville is a ghost town in New Castle County, Delaware, United States. The community consisted of a development on Bread and Cheese Island, on the east bank of the Red Clay Creek near its mouth, just south of Delaware Route 4 near Stanton. Located in the floodplain for Red Clay Creek, the subdivision has always been prone to flooding, such as flooding from Hurricane Floyd in 1999 and Tropical Storm Henri in 2003. After floods caused by Tropical Storm Henri on September 15, 2003, homeowners were bought out by the state and local government, and the community was abandoned in 2004. Demolition began in 2005. As of 2023, the remains of the town are fenced off to prevent trespassers.

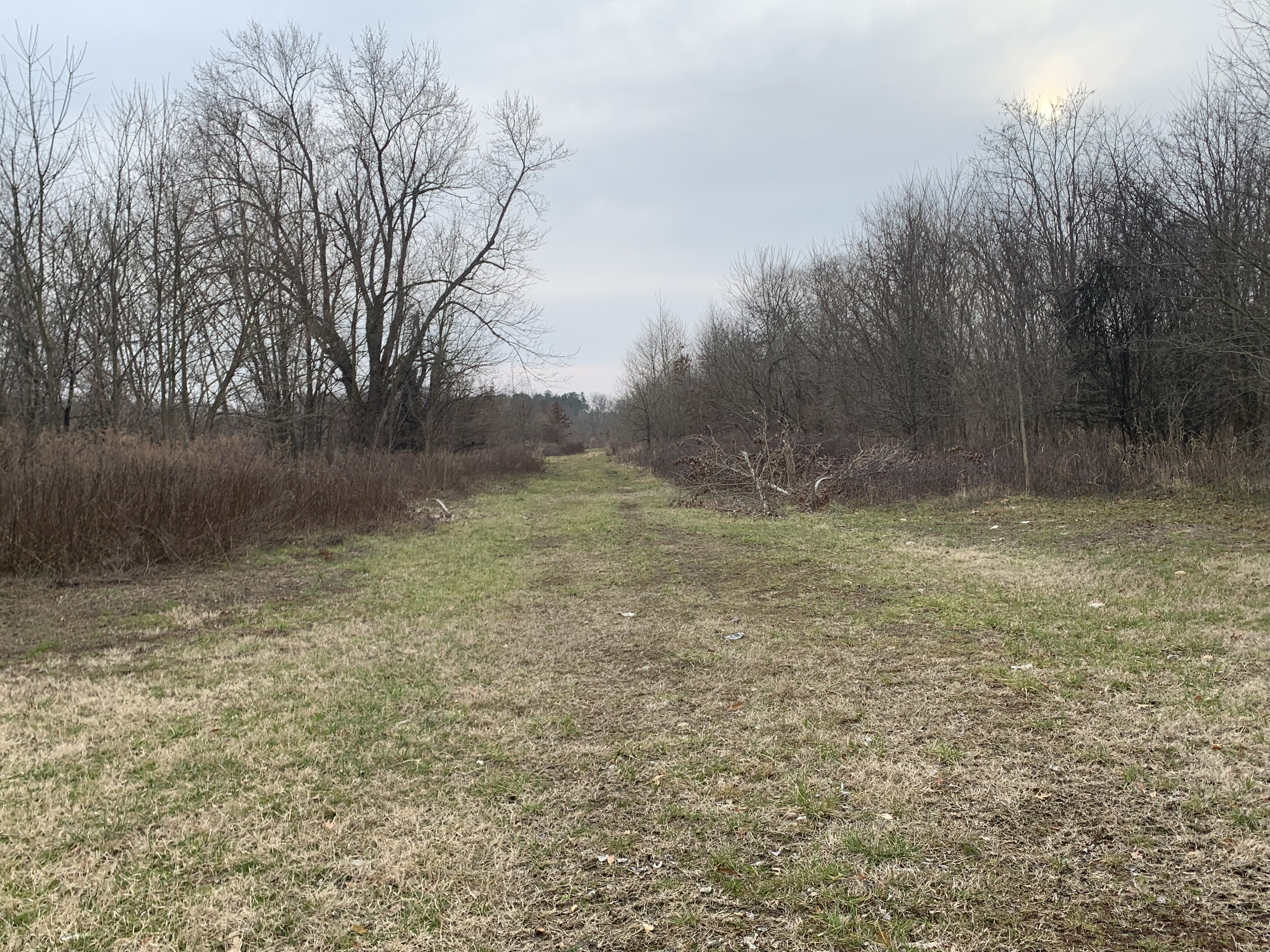
