= List of ghost towns in New York =

This is an incomplete list of ghost towns in New York.

== Cattauragus County ==
- Elko (Quaker Bridge)
- New Ireland
- Onoville (see Kinzua Dam)
- Red House (see Allegany State Park)

== Delaware County ==
- Shavertown (submerged into the Pepacton Reservoir)

== Dutchess County ==
- Oswego, New York (hamlet), not to be confused with the city of Oswego, New York

== Essex County ==
- Tahawus

== Franklin County ==
- Reynoldston

== Montgomery County ==
- Waterville (now located on a private residence; see Canajoharie)

== Niagara County ==
- Love Canal

== Oneida County ==
- Delta (submerged into the Delta Reservoir)

== Ontario County ==
- Valentown (never incorporated, now part of Victor)

== Oswego County ==
- Happy Valley (see New York State Wildlife Management Areas)

== Rockland County ==
- Doodletown

== Saratoga County ==
- Conklingville (evacuated and used to dam the Great Sacandaga Lake)

== Suffolk County ==
- Northwest Settlement

== Ulster County ==
- Brownville (see Wawarsing and Potterville)
- Potterville (see Wawarsing)
- Trapps Mountain Hamlet, now part of Mohonk Preserve (see also Gardiner)
- West Hurley (submerged into the Ashokan Reservoir)

== Westchester County ==
- Kensico (submerged into the Kensico Reservoir)
