= Hinkletown, Iowa =

Former town in Keokuk County, Iowa

Coordinates: 41°30′40″N 91°58′10″W

Hinkletown was a small town in Keokuk County, Iowa during the nineteenth century.

== History ==
Hinkletown was founded in 1858 by Harmon Hinkle who moved from Richmond, Iowa. By 1863, there was a post office, a black smith shop, a schoolhouse, and two lodges. In 1872, the railroad bypassed the town to the south and many residents moved to the new town of Keota, Iowa. Then in 1879, a railroad bypassed Hinkletown despite the efforts of the townspeople to bring it to Hinkletown. The remaining residents soon moved to Kinross, Iowa, Parnell, Iowa, and Green Valley (an area lying east of North English, Iowa).
