= Stowe, Vermont =

- Town
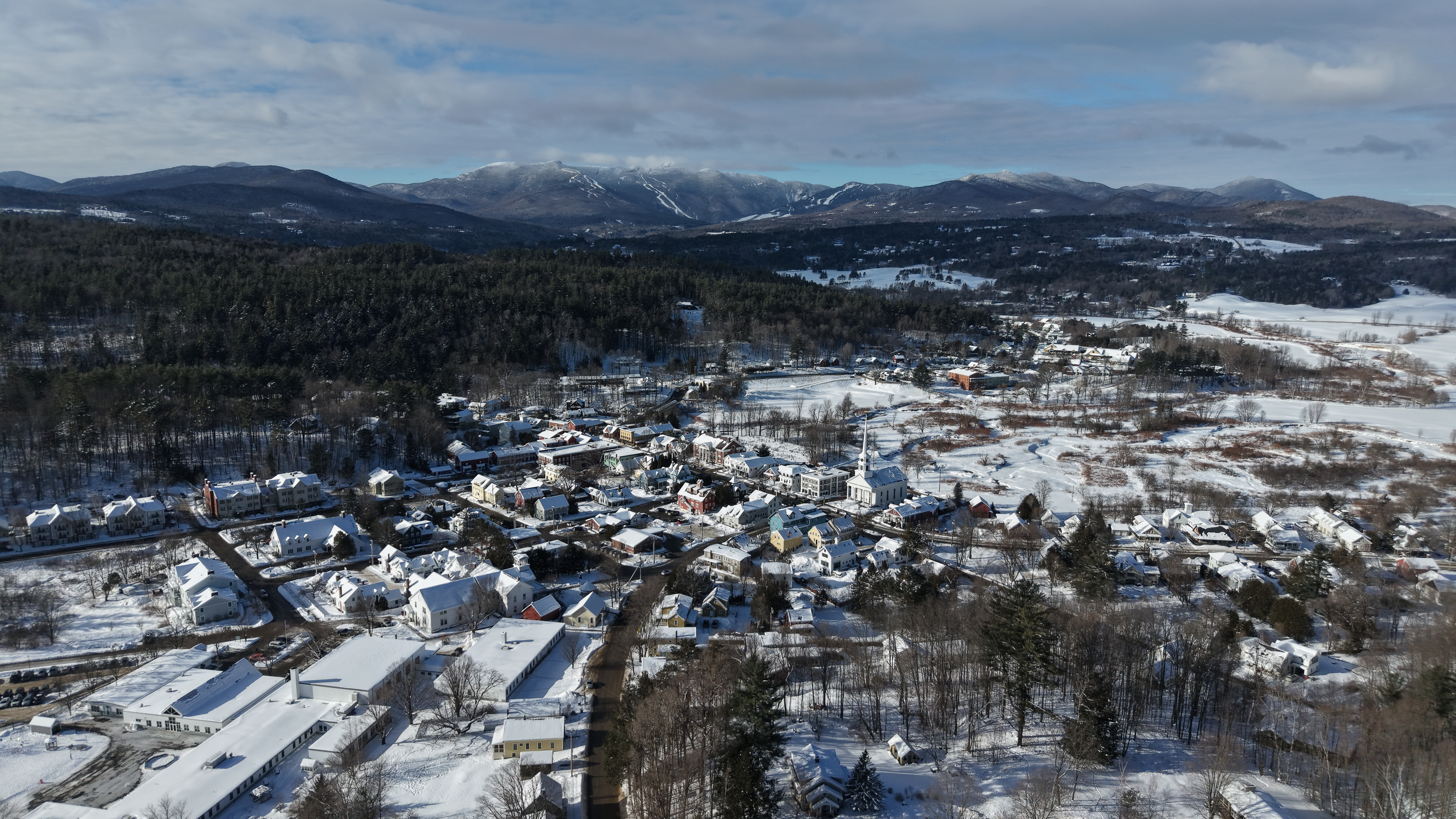
- Aerial view of Stowe from the southeast

- Seal
- Nickname: The Ski Capital of the East
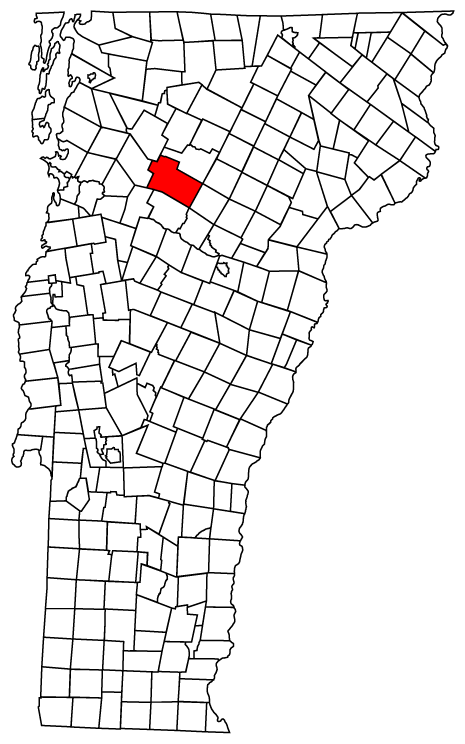
- Stowe, Vermont
- Coordinates: 44°30′02″N 72°43′06″W
- Country: United States
- State: Vermont
- County: Lamoille
- Communities: Stowe; Lower Village; Moscow; Stowe Fork; West Branch

Government
  - Type: Select board

Area
  - Total: 72.76 sq mi (188.45 km^{2})
  - Land: 72.60 sq mi (188.03 km^{2})
  - Water: 0.16 sq mi (0.42 km^{2})
- Elevation: 892 ft (272 m)

Population (2020)
  - Total: 5,223
  - Density: 72/sq mi (27.8/km^{2})
- Demonym: Stowner
- Time zone: UTC-5 (Eastern (EST))
  - Summer (DST): UTC-4 (EDT)
- ZIP code: 05672
- Area code: 802
- FIPS code: 50-70525
- GNIS feature ID: 1462219
- Website: www.stowevt.gov

Stowe is a town in Lamoille County, Vermont, United States. The population was 5,223 at the 2020 census. The town lies on Vermont Routes 108 and 100. It is nicknamed "The Ski Capital of the East" and is home to Stowe Mountain Resort, a ski facility with terrain on Mount Mansfield, the highest peak in Vermont, and Spruce Peak.

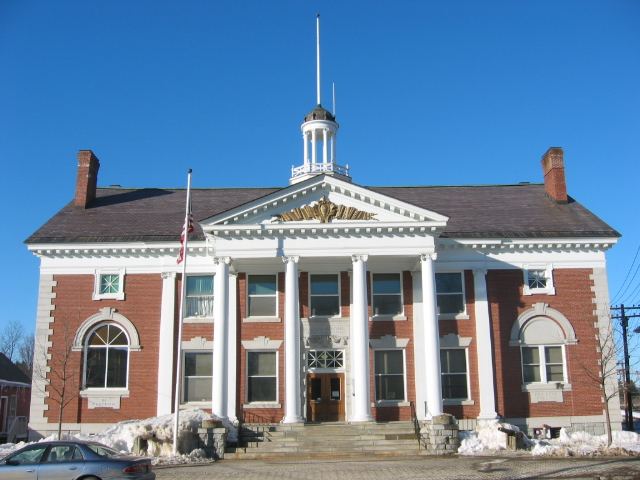
Stowe Town Hall

== History ==
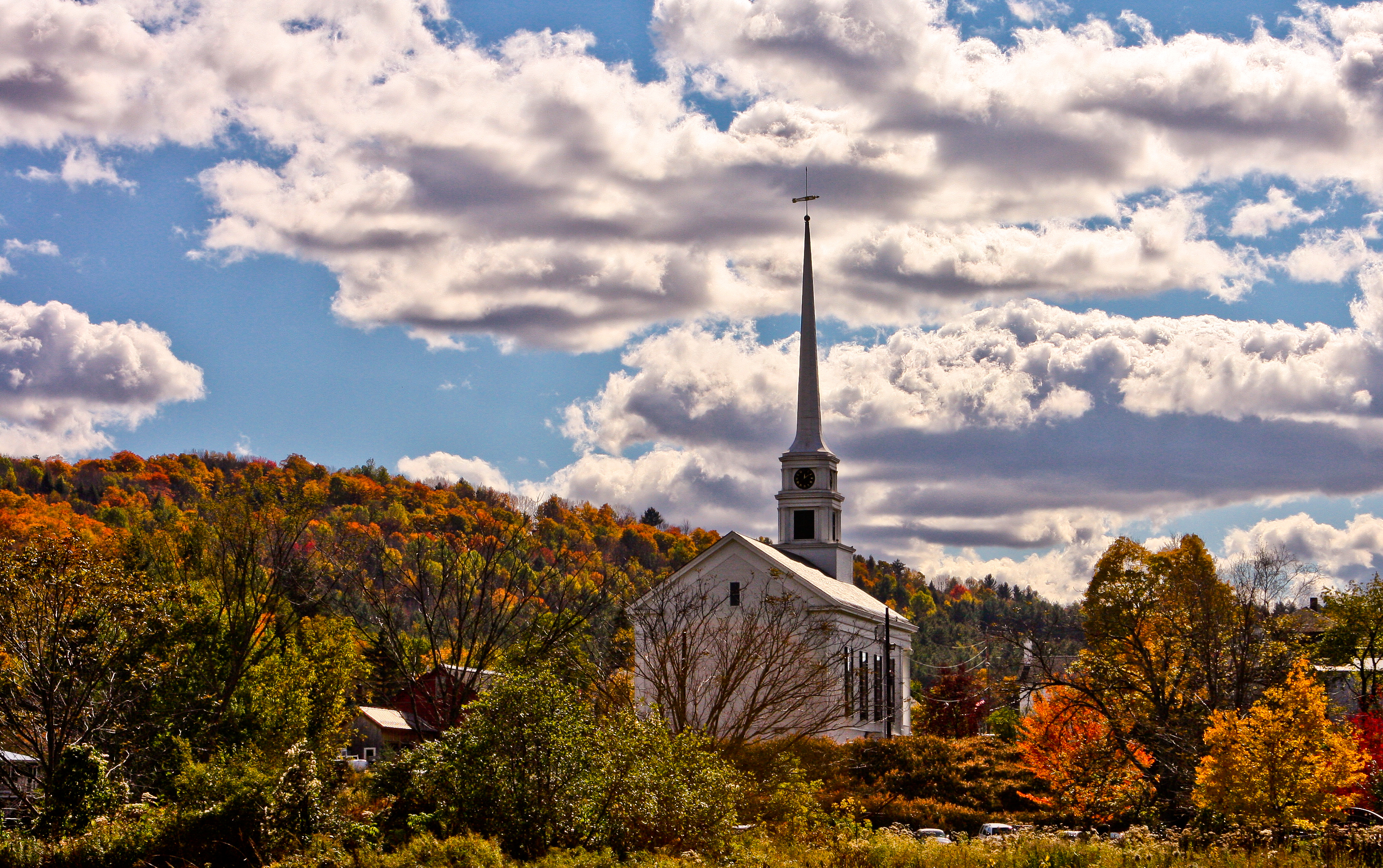
Stowe Community Church

The indigenous people who lived in the area now called Vermont were primarily Abenaki, who spoke Algonquian. They were forced aside by strategies of displacement after primarily British settlers flooded into the area after the French and Indian War. There are no surviving names from the original language, which was most likely Mahican, an Algonquian dialect akin to Abenaki.

Stowe was chartered on June 8, 1763, by Royal Governor Benning Wentworth of the Province of New Hampshire. Vermont became a U.S. state in 1791. Two years later more settlers arrived in Stowe. By the turn of the nineteenth century, the majority of the town's property had been sold, and its population had risen to 316.

Stowe's early years were dominated by the farm and lumber industries. Over 75 percent of the land in Stowe and most of Vermont used to be open terrain cleared by lumber production and used for agriculture, particularly sheep farming. In those days, up to 8000 sheep grazed the Stowe hills and valleys.

Stowe's agricultural fortunes changed alongside those of the rest of New England. Most of Vermont eventually switched from sheep to dairy farms, with more than 100 farms in Stowe alone. This move allowed 75 percent of the cleared area to reforest over time.

Unlike much of the rest of Vermont, Stowe's past was not centered solely on agriculture. It had become a well-known summer resort by the mid-nineteenth century, thanks to its mountain scenery.

The Summit House atop Mt. Mansfield was constructed just before the American Civil War broke out. The Toll Road to reach it followed by 1870. At that time the 300-room Mansfield House occupied the majority of the settlement. The latter, often known as the "Big Hotel," burned down in 1889. Behind it lay a vast stable with over 100 horses, equipment, carriages, and stable hands. In 1953, the barn was demolished over fire concern, and several of the original beams were repurposed in the construction of The Whip Bar & Grill. The Depot Building located next to the Green Mountain Inn was erected in 1897 for the Mt. Mansfield Electric Railway. Running the 11 miles between Waterbury and Stowe, it carried both passengers and freight until 1932.

Through the First World War, summer tourism remained crucial to Stowe's economy. Stowe had its inaugural Winter Carnival in 1921, including ski jumping, skating, and a variety of other enjoyable activities. The Civilian Conservation Corps erected camps and began clearing ski tracks on Mt. Mansfield during the Great Depression, leading to Stowe becoming an early mecca for downhill skiing in the United States. The Bruce Trail, which ran from the current site of the Octagon to Ranch Camp, was the first built in 1933. The Mt. Mansfield Ski Touring trail system now includes this trail as well. The Nose Dive, the next ski trail, was created in 1934. Skiers used to trek the 2.5 miles to the summit in the early days. Chairlifts, which began with a single chair in 1940, overtook rope tows as the more convenient way. The chair was in service until 1986, when it was replaced with a high-speed detachable quad.

The Vermont Ski Museum was founded in 1988, and relocated to Stowe in 2000. It contains information and artifacts on the history of skiing and snowboarding in Vermont.

Stowe remains a premier Eastern resort town, summer and winter.

== Geography ==
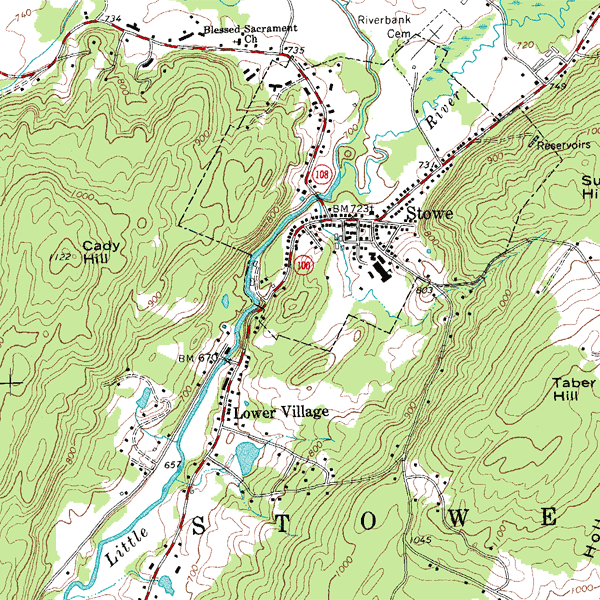
Topographic map of the region around Stowe

Stowe is in southern Lamoille County, lying in a broad, fertile valley between Mount Mansfield and other peaks of the Green Mountains to the west, and the Worcester Range to the east. The town is bordered by Chittenden County to the west and Washington County to the south and east. The village of Stowe sits in the east-central part of the town, along the Little River where it is joined by its West Branch. The Little River, a tributary of the Winooski, flows southward past the village of Moscow and into Waterbury Reservoir, a large reservoir created by a flood control dam in Waterbury but which extends north into the Stowe town limits.

== Transportation ==
Vermont Route 100 crosses the town from north to south, passing through the village of Stowe. VT 100 leads north 9 miles (14 km) to Morrisville and south 10 miles (16 km) to Waterbury. Vermont Route 108 has its southern terminus in Stowe village and leads northwest through Smugglers Notch 17 miles (27 km) to Jeffersonville in the Lamoille River valley.

According to the United States Census Bureau, the town has a total area of 72.8 square miles (188.5 km^{2}), of which 72.6 square miles (188.0 km^{2}) are land and 0.15 square miles (0.4 km^{2}), or 0.23%, are water. By area, it is the second-largest town in the state of Vermont after Chittenden in Rutland County.

== Climate ==
According to the Trewartha climate classification system:

=== Mount Mansfield ===
Mount Mansfield has a temperate continental climate (Dc) with mild summers (l), very cold winters (c) and year-around precipitation (Dclc). Dclc climates are characterized by at least one month having an average mean temperature ≤ −10.0 °C (14.0 °F), four to seven months with an average mean temperature ≥ 10.0 °C (50.0 °F), all months with an average mean temperature < 72.0 °F (22.2 °C) and no significant precipitation difference between seasons. Although most summer days are humid on Mount Mansfield, episodes of warmth and high humidity can occur with heat index values > 27 °C (81 °F). Since 1981, the highest air temperature was 31.9 °C (89.5 °F) on 07/08/1988, and the highest daily average mean dew point was 21.0 °C (69.8 °F) on 08/01/2006. July is the peak month for thunderstorm activity which correlates with the average warmest month of the year. Since 1981, the wettest calendar day was 5.74 inches (146 mm) on 09/16/1999. During the winter months, the plant hardiness zone is 4a with an average annual extreme minimum air temperature of −32.6 °C (−26.7 °F). Since 1981, the coldest air temperature was −37.6 °C (−35.6 °F) on 01/27/1994. Episodes of extreme cold and wind can occur with wind chill values below −41 °C (−42 °F). Ice storms and large snowstorms depositing ≥ 12 inches (30 cm) of snow are frequent from late-fall to early-spring.

Climate data for Mount Mansfield, Elevation 3,999 ft (1,219 m), 1991–2020 normals, extremes 1981–2018
Month	Jan	Feb	Mar	Apr	May	Jun	Jul	Aug	Sep	Oct	Nov	Dec	Year
Record high °F (°C)	56.0 (13.3)	63.7 (17.6)	75.6 (24.2)	82.4 (28.0)	84.5 (29.2)	88.5 (31.4)	89.5 (31.9)	89.0 (31.7)	88.0 (31.1)	75.1 (23.9)	65.7 (18.7)	59.8 (15.4)	89.5 (31.9)
Mean daily maximum °F (°C)	18.6 (−7.4)	20.1 (−6.6)	27.3 (−2.6)	40.7 (4.8)	54.1 (12.3)	62.5 (16.9)	66.3 (19.1)	64.8 (18.2)	58.9 (14.9)	45.9 (7.7)	33.4 (0.8)	24.0 (−4.4)	43.0 (6.1)
Daily mean °F (°C)	10.7 (−11.8)	12.2 (−11.0)	19.8 (−6.8)	32.4 (0.2)	45.7 (7.6)	54.9 (12.7)	59.3 (15.2)	57.8 (14.3)	51.5 (10.8)	39.1 (3.9)	27.1 (−2.7)	17.2 (−8.2)	35.6 (2.0)
Mean daily minimum °F (°C)	2.7 (−16.3)	4.2 (−15.4)	12.2 (−11.0)	24.2 (−4.3)	37.4 (3.0)	47.2 (8.4)	52.2 (11.2)	50.8 (10.4)	44.1 (6.7)	32.4 (0.2)	20.8 (−6.2)	10.5 (−11.9)	28.2 (−2.1)
Record low °F (°C)	−35.6 (−37.6)	−34.4 (−36.9)	−21.6 (−29.8)	1.3 (−17.1)	19.3 (−7.1)	27.1 (−2.7)	37.6 (3.1)	32.9 (0.5)	22.3 (−5.4)	15.4 (−9.2)	−6.9 (−21.6)	−26.7 (−32.6)	−35.6 (−37.6)
Average precipitation inches (mm)	5.66 (144)	5.50 (140)	5.88 (149)	6.41 (163)	6.96 (177)	8.43 (214)	7.27 (185)	6.69 (170)	7.31 (186)	7.39 (188)	6.40 (163)	6.76 (172)	80.66 (2,051)
Average relative humidity (%)	86.6	87.5	71.8	62.6	65.2	71.5	76.6	77.9	78.5	75.0	77.9	87.7	76.5
Average dew point °F (°C)	6.8 (−14.0)	10.0 (−12.2)	13.8 (−10.1)	23.8 (−4.6)	36.7 (2.6)	47.5 (8.6)	53.6 (12.0)	52.8 (11.6)	46.3 (7.9)	33.3 (0.7)	22.1 (−5.5)	12.7 (−10.7)	30.0 (−1.1)
Source: PRISM

=== The Lodge at Spruce Peak ===
The Lodge at Spruce Peak has a temperate continental climate (Dc) with warm summers (b), cold winters (o) and year-around precipitation (Dcbo). Dcbo climates are characterized by at least one month having an average mean temperature ≤ 0.0 °C (32.0 °F), four to seven months with an average mean temperature ≥ 10.0 °C (50.0 °F), all months with an average mean temperature < 22.2 °C (72.0 °F) and no significant precipitation difference between seasons. Although most summer days are humid at The Lodge at Spruce Peak, episodes of warmth and high humidity can occur with heat index values > 31 °C (88 °F). Since 1981, the highest air temperature was 32.1 °C (89.8 °F) on 07/08/1988, and the highest daily average mean dew point was 20.9 °C (69.7 °F) on 08/01/2006. July is the peak month for thunderstorm activity which correlates with the average warmest month of the year. Since 1981, the wettest calendar day was 5.62 inches (143 mm) on 09/16/1999. During the winter months, the plant hardiness zone is 4b with an average annual extreme minimum air temperature of −30.9 °C (−23.7 °F). Since 1981, the coldest air temperature was −37.7 °C (−35.8 °F) on 01/27/1994. Episodes of extreme cold and wind can occur with wind chill values < −39 °C (−38 °F). Ice storms and large snowstorms depositing ≥ 30 centimetres (12 in) of snow are somewhat frequent from December through March.

Climate data for The Lodge at Spruce Peak, Elevation 1,673 ft (510 m), 1991–2020 normals, extremes 1981–2018
Month	Jan	Feb	Mar	Apr	May	Jun	Jul	Aug	Sep	Oct	Nov	Dec	Year
Record high °F (°C)	56.6 (13.7)	64.4 (18.0)	76.0 (24.4)	82.3 (27.9)	84.6 (29.2)	88.8 (31.6)	89.8 (32.1)	89.1 (31.7)	88.0 (31.1)	75.2 (24.0)	66.2 (19.0)	60.5 (15.8)	89.8 (32.1)
Mean daily maximum °F (°C)	24.1 (−4.4)	27.1 (−2.7)	35.7 (2.1)	48.7 (9.3)	62.3 (16.8)	70.6 (21.4)	75.0 (23.9)	73.5 (23.1)	66.7 (19.3)	53.2 (11.8)	40.6 (4.8)	29.6 (−1.3)	50.6 (10.3)
Daily mean °F (°C)	15.5 (−9.2)	17.7 (−7.9)	26.5 (−3.1)	39.5 (4.2)	52.6 (11.4)	61.1 (16.2)	65.7 (18.7)	64.1 (17.8)	57.0 (13.9)	44.9 (7.2)	33.4 (0.8)	22.4 (−5.3)	41.7 (5.4)
Mean daily minimum °F (°C)	7.0 (−13.9)	8.2 (−13.2)	17.4 (−8.1)	30.3 (−0.9)	42.8 (6.0)	51.7 (10.9)	56.4 (13.6)	54.8 (12.7)	47.2 (8.4)	36.7 (2.6)	26.2 (−3.2)	15.2 (−9.3)	32.8 (0.5)
Record low °F (°C)	−35.8 (−37.7)	−34.0 (−36.7)	−21.7 (−29.8)	2.3 (−16.5)	20.6 (−6.3)	27.3 (−2.6)	37.7 (3.2)	32.8 (0.4)	22.2 (−5.4)	15.6 (−9.1)	−6.5 (−21.4)	−26.4 (−32.4)	−35.8 (−37.7)
Average precipitation inches (mm)	4.38 (111)	4.02 (102)	4.55 (116)	5.05 (128)	5.42 (138)	6.49 (165)	5.98 (152)	5.48 (139)	5.60 (142)	6.17 (157)	5.06 (129)	5.30 (135)	63.5 (1,614)
Average relative humidity (%)	82.0	77.7	70.3	63.8	63.1	70.2	74.3	74.4	75.3	76.3	79.0	85.0	74.3
Average dew point °F (°C)	10.7 (−11.8)	12.2 (−11.0)	18.7 (−7.4)	29.1 (−1.6)	40.5 (4.7)	51.6 (10.9)	57.1 (13.9)	55.4 (13.0)	48.4 (9.1)	37.3 (2.9)	27.5 (−2.5)	17.2 (−8.2)	33.9 (1.1)
Source: PRISM

=== Stowe village ===
Stowe village has a temperate continental climate (Dc) with warm summers (b), cold winters (o) and year-around precipitation (Dcbo). Dcbo climates are characterized by at least one month having an average mean temperature ≤ 32.0 °F (0.0 °C), four to seven months with an average mean temperature ≥ 50.0 °F (10.0 °C), all months with an average mean temperature < 72.0 °F (22.2 °C) and no significant precipitation difference between seasons. Although most summer days are comfortably humid at Stowe village, episodes of heat and high humidity can occur with heat index values > 92 °F (33 °C). Since 1981, the highest air temperature was 94.7 °F (34.8 °C) on 07/09/1988, and the highest daily average mean dew point was 71.9 °F (22.2 °C) on 07/01/2018. July is the peak month for thunderstorm activity which correlates with the average warmest month of the year. Since 1981, the wettest calendar day was 4.65 inches (118 mm) on 08/28/2011. During the winter months, the plant hardiness zone is 4a with an average annual extreme minimum air temperature of −25.2 °F (−31.8 °C). Since 1981, the coldest air temperature was −35.1 °F (−37.3 °C) on 01/27/1994. Episodes of extreme cold and wind can occur with wind chill values < −40 °F (−40 °C). Ice storms and large snowstorms depositing ≥ 12 inches (30 cm) of snow occur once or twice per winter.

Climate data for Stowe Village, Elevation 791 ft (241 m), 1981–2010 normals, extremes 1981–2018
Month	Jan	Feb	Mar	Apr	May	Jun	Jul	Aug	Sep	Oct	Nov	Dec	Year
Record high °F (°C)	61.3 (16.3)	68.5 (20.3)	79.5 (26.4)	86.3 (30.2)	88.7 (31.5)	93.5 (34.2)	94.7 (34.8)	93.1 (33.9)	91.3 (32.9)	78.4 (25.8)	71.1 (21.7)	65.1 (18.4)	94.7 (34.8)
Mean daily maximum °F (°C)	26.1 (−3.3)	29.8 (−1.2)	38.8 (3.8)	52.8 (11.6)	65.8 (18.8)	74.4 (23.6)	78.7 (25.9)	77.2 (25.1)	69.0 (20.6)	55.9 (13.3)	43.6 (6.4)	31.1 (−0.5)	53.7 (12.1)
Daily mean °F (°C)	15.8 (−9.0)	18.7 (−7.4)	28.0 (−2.2)	41.8 (5.4)	53.5 (11.9)	62.8 (17.1)	67.2 (19.6)	65.6 (18.7)	57.6 (14.2)	45.6 (7.6)	35.1 (1.7)	22.4 (−5.3)	43.0 (6.1)
Mean daily minimum °F (°C)	5.6 (−14.7)	7.5 (−13.6)	17.2 (−8.2)	30.7 (−0.7)	41.3 (5.2)	51.3 (10.7)	55.7 (13.2)	53.9 (12.2)	46.1 (7.8)	35.2 (1.8)	26.6 (−3.0)	13.7 (−10.2)	32.2 (0.1)
Record low °F (°C)	−35.1 (−37.3)	−32.0 (−35.6)	−20.5 (−29.2)	6.8 (−14.0)	24.1 (−4.4)	29.7 (−1.3)	38.1 (3.4)	34.5 (1.4)	22.9 (−5.1)	16.9 (−8.4)	−3.9 (−19.9)	−24.3 (−31.3)	−35.1 (−37.3)
Average precipitation inches (mm)	2.68 (68)	2.42 (61)	2.86 (73)	3.18 (81)	3.83 (97)	4.11 (104)	4.45 (113)	4.47 (114)	3.51 (89)	4.39 (112)	3.61 (92)	3.24 (82)	42.75 (1,086)
Average relative humidity (%)	75.7	73.4	67.7	61.4	63.5	68.8	71.1	72.7	74.6	73.2	75.7	80.1	71.5
Average dew point °F (°C)	9.5 (−12.5)	11.6 (−11.3)	18.7 (−7.4)	29.5 (−1.4)	41.4 (5.2)	52.4 (11.3)	57.5 (14.2)	56.6 (13.7)	49.6 (9.8)	37.5 (3.1)	28.2 (−2.1)	17.2 (−8.2)	34.2 (1.2)
Source: PRISM

== Ecology ==
According to the A. W. Kuchler U.S. potential natural vegetation types:

=== Mount Mansfield ===
Mount Mansfield has a dominant vegetation type of Northeast Spruce/Fir (96) with a dominant vegetation form of Northern Conifer forest (22). The peak spring bloom typically occurs in late-May and peak fall color usually occurs in late-September. The plant hardiness zone is 4a with an average annual extreme minimum air temperature of −26.7 °F (−32.6 °C).

=== The Lodge at Spruce Peak ===
The Lodge at Spruce Peak has a dominant vegetation type of Northeast Spruce/Fir (96) with a dominant vegetation form of Northern Conifer forest (22). The peak spring bloom typically occurs in mid-May and peak fall color usually occurs in late-September. The plant hardiness zone is 4b with an average annual extreme minimum air temperature of −30.9 °C (−23.7 °F).

=== Stowe village ===
Stowe village has a dominant vegetation type of Northern [Hardwood]s/[Spruce] (108) with a dominant vegetation form of Northern Hardwoods (23). The peak spring bloom typically occurs in early-May and peak fall color usually occurs in late-September. The plant hardiness zone is 4a with an average annual extreme minimum air temperature of −31.8 °C (−25.2 °F).

== Demographics ==
Historical population
Census	Pop.	Note	%±
1800	316		—
1810	650		105.7%
1820	957		47.2%
1830	1,570		64.1%
1840	1,371		−12.7%
1850	1,771		29.2%
1860	2,046		15.5%
1870	2,049		0.1%
1880	1,896		−7.5%
1890	1,886		−0.5%
1900	1,926		2.1%
1910	1,991		3.4%
1920	1,800		−9.6%
1930	1,654		−8.1%
1940	1,741		5.3%
1950	1,720		−1.2%
1960	1,901		10.5%
1970	2,388		25.6%
1980	2,991		25.3%
1990	3,433		14.8%
2000	4,339		26.4%
2010	4,314		−0.6%
2020	5,223		21.1%
U.S. Decennial Census

As of the census of 2000, there were 4339 people, 1905 households, and 1129 families residing in the town. The population density was 59.7 people per square mile (23.1/km^{2}). There were 2,728 housing units at an average density of 37.5 per square mile (14.5/km^{2}). The racial makeup of the town was 97.51% White, 0.28% African American, 0.37% Native American, 0.44% Asian, 0.23% from other races, and 1.18% from two or more races. Hispanic or Latino of any race were 1.06% of the population.

There were 1,905 households, out of which 26.1% had children under the age of 18 living with them, 50.0% were married couples living together, 6.4% had a female householder with no husband present, and 40.7% were non-families. 29.0% of all households were made up of individuals, and 8.9% had someone living alone who was 65 years of age or older. The average household size was 2.27 and the average family size was 2.83.

In the town, the population was spread out, with 21.1% under the age of 18, 6.9% from 18 to 24, 28.3% from 25 to 44, 30.3% from 45 to 64, and 13.5% who were 65 years of age or older. The median age was 41 years. For every 100 females, there were 103.6 males. For every 100 females age 18 and over, there were 101.2 males.

== Economy ==
There has been some manufacturing in Stowe, such as the Tubbs Snowshoe factory, but it closed in 2009 and moved its manufacturing overseas.

The median income for a household in the town was $52,378, and the median income for a family was $64,700. Males had a median income of $37,788 versus $31,689 for females. The per capita income for the town was $35,474. About 3.7% of families and 6.8% of the population were below the poverty line, including 6.8% of those under age 18 and 5.3% of those age 65 or over. The median house value was $412,183 in 2012.

== Points of interest ==
- Trapp Family Lodge
- Vermont Ski and Snowboard Museum
- Stowe Mountain Resort – Stowe, "The Ski Capital of the East", has long been known for its winter recreation. Its ski area was purchased by Vail Resorts in 2017 for $41 million. It has 117 ski runs spread over Mount Mansfield and Spruce Peak, and boasts 13 lifts.
- Stowe Recreation Path – a recreation trail that runs 8.5 kilometres (5.3 mi), and was completed in 1989 at a total cost of $680000. The path stretches from the Village downtown all the way to the TopNotch Lodge. It has received several awards and honors.
- Cady Hill Forest on the western edge of Stowe village was conserved by the Stowe Land Trust in 2012 and transferred to the town of Stowe. It offers more than 18 kilometres (11 mi) of hiking and mountain bike trails, with an access point off Route 108 (Mountain Road). The Stowe Mountain Bike Club is currently responsible for maintaining the trail network.

== Education ==
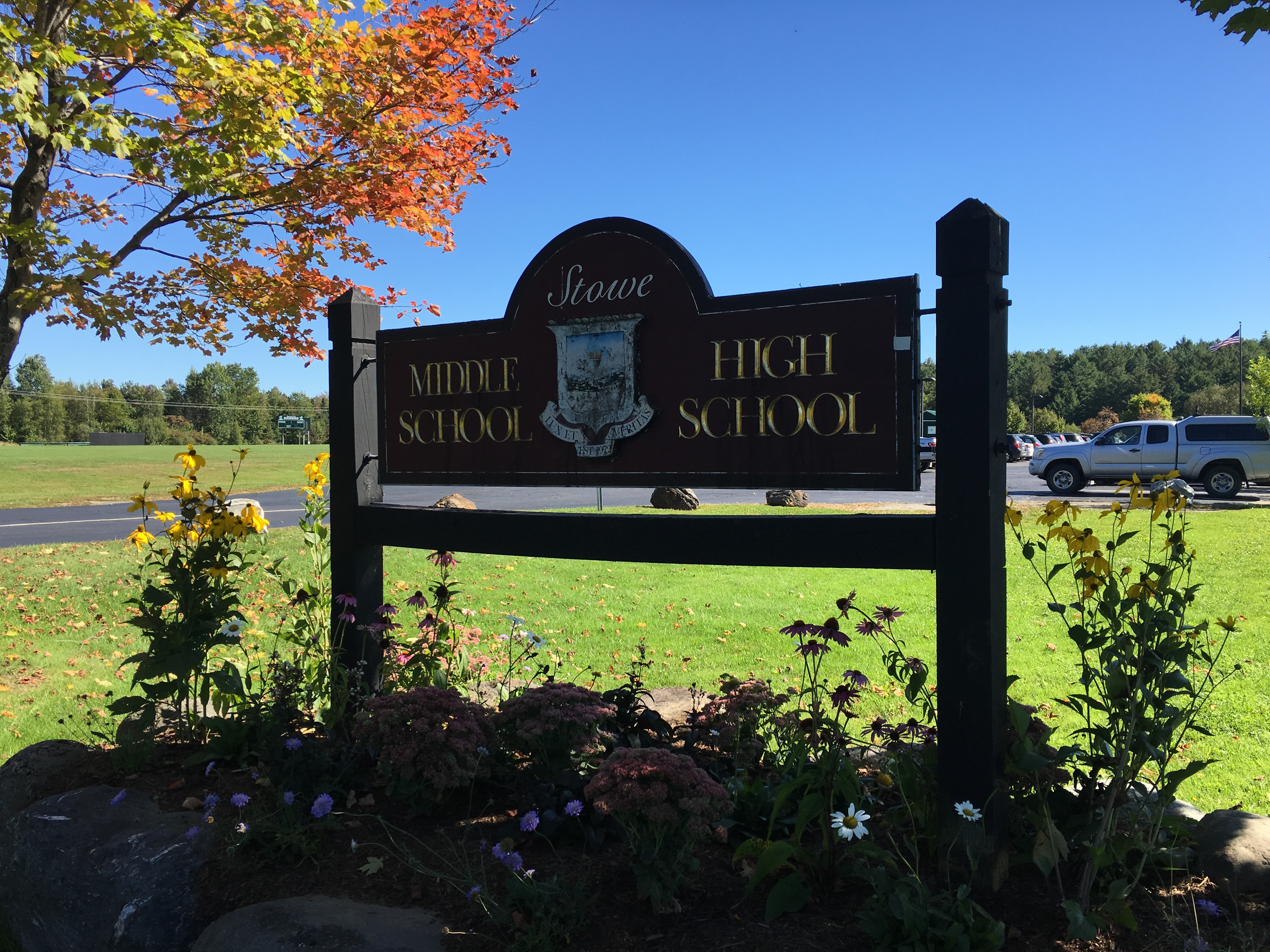
The middle and high school are adjacent.

There are three public schools in town: Stowe Elementary School, Stowe Middle School, and Stowe High School. The Mount Mansfield Winter Academy is located in Stowe, which has a focus on snow sport athletes.

== Stowe Land Trust ==
Stowe Land Trust is a local land conservation nonprofit that was founded in 1987 and has conserved 35 properties and over 18 square kilometres (4500 acres), many of which are available to the public. One is Wiessner Woods, conserved by the trust in 1992 through a donation from the Wiessner family.

== Media ==
The Stowe Reporter, covering local politics, business, arts, and personalities, has been the weekly newspaper of record for the town of Stowe since its founding in 1958. The Vermont Community Newspaper Group, owner of the Stowe Reporter and four other community weekly newspapers in Vermont, is based in Stowe.

Radio station WCVT is licensed to Stowe, and programs a classic hits format.

== Notable people ==
- Walter J. Bigelow, mayor of Burlington
- Jake Burton Carpenter, CEO of Burton Snowboards
- W. H. H. Bingham, Vermont attorney and politician
- Rusty DeWees, comedian, actor, and writer
- Noah Dines, skier
- Joseph Dutton, worked as a missionary with Father Damien
- William "Billy" Kidd, first American man to earn an Olympic medal in alpine skiing
- Joe Kirkwood Sr., golfer
- Fr. Emmanuel Lemelson, activist investor and Greek Orthodox Priest
- Graham Mink, former right wing for the Washington Capitals
- Dean Roy, highschooler who was running for governor of Vermont at age 14
- Tiger Shaw, Olympics alpine ski racer and President of U.S.S.A.
- Joseph Skinger, artisan
- Ken Squier, Lap-by-Lap commentator for NASCAR
- Maria von Trapp, matriarch of the Trapp Family Singers
- Ty Walker, youngest member of the 2014 US Olympic Slopestyle Snowboard team
- Fritz Wiessner, pioneer of free climbing

== Gallery ==
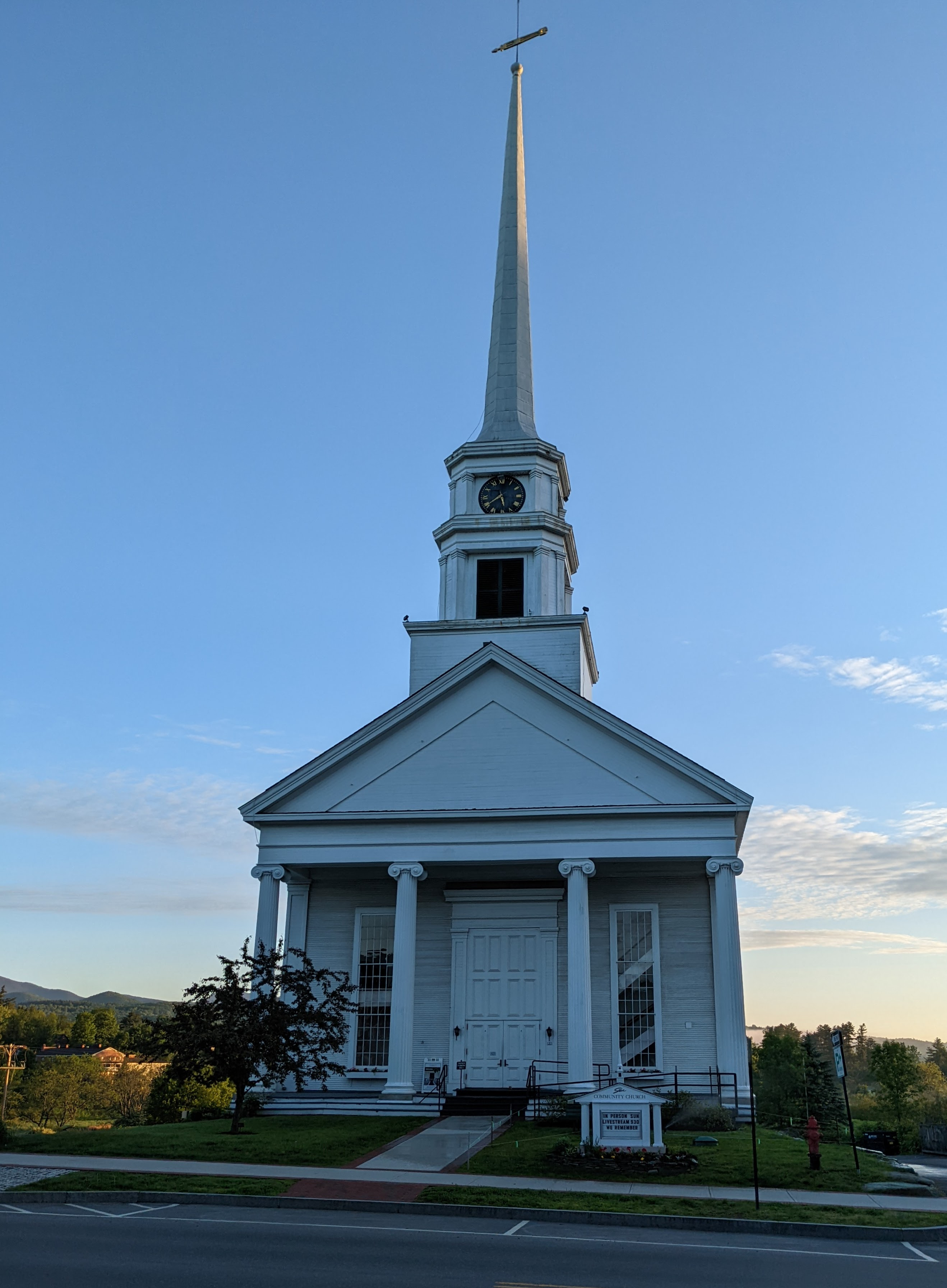
Stowe Community Church

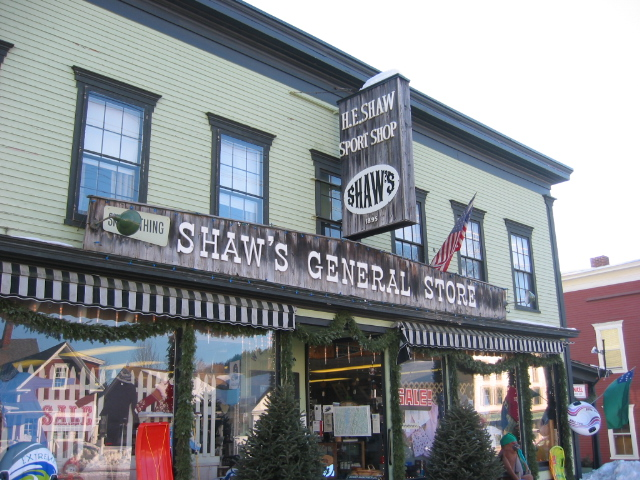
Shaw's general store lies opposite the Town Hall

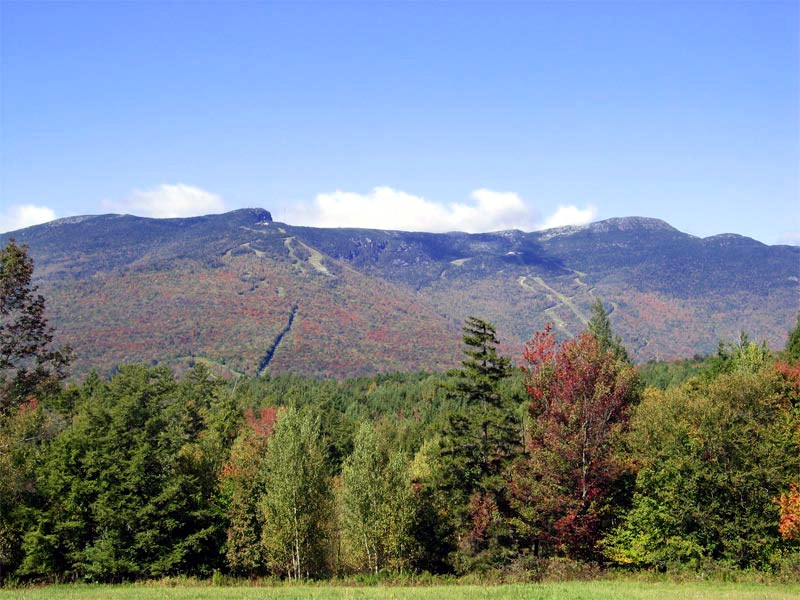
Mount Mansfield is the highest point in the state of Vermont, and home to the Stowe Mountain Resort

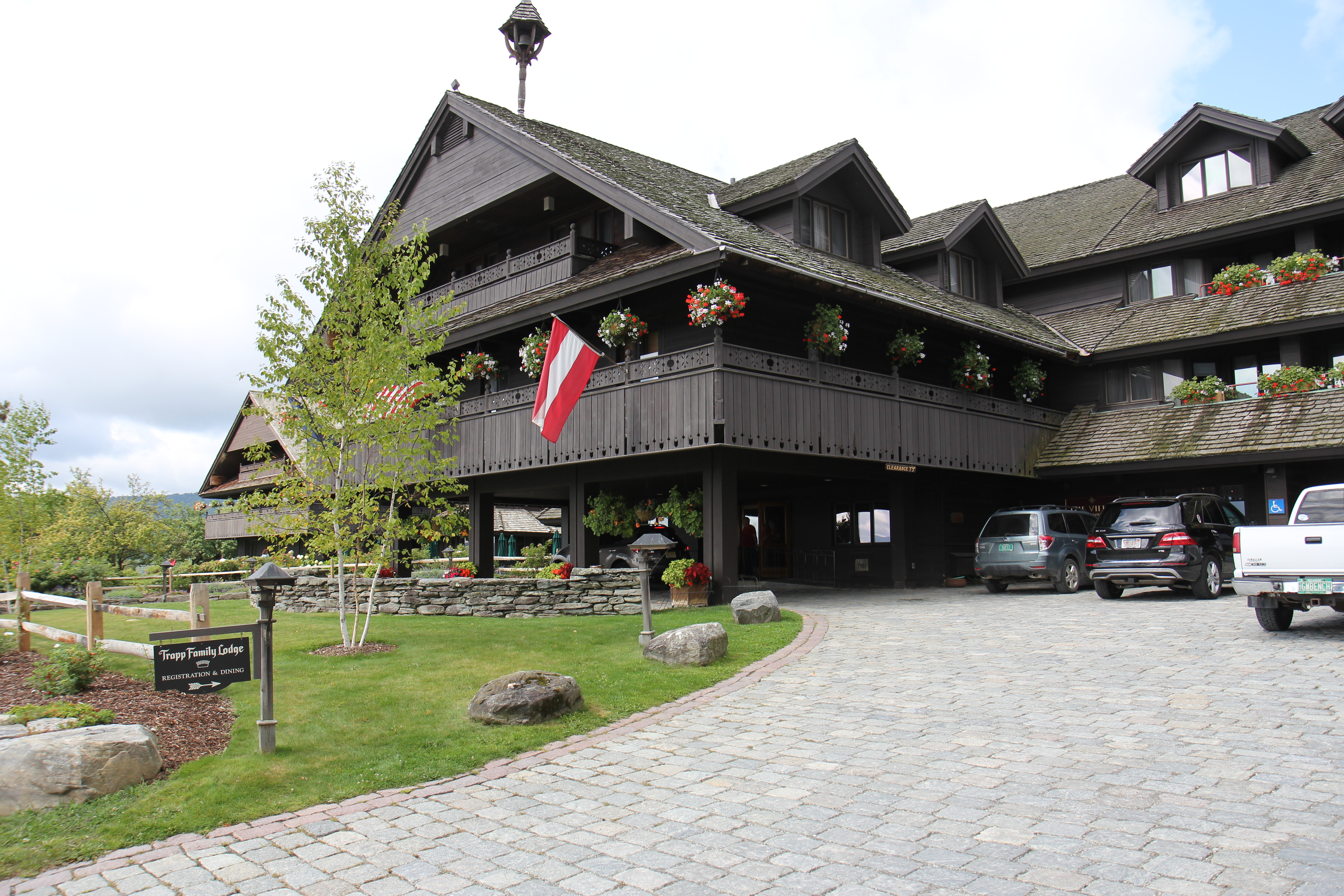
Trapp Family Lodge
