= Tornado outbreak of May 15–16, 1968 =

Weather event in the United States

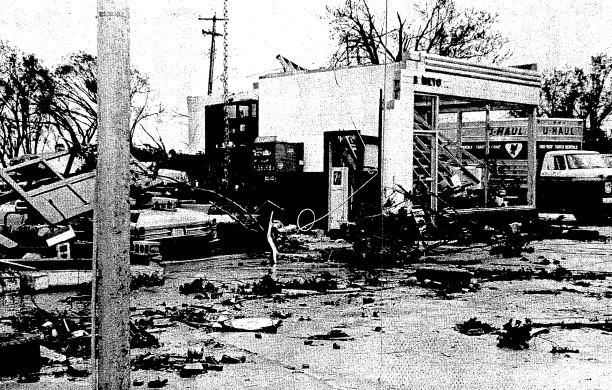
- Major damage in Oelwein, Iowa after an F5 tornado devastated the town on May 15.

Meteorological history
- Duration: May 15–16, 1968

Tornado outbreak
- Tornadoes: 46 confirmed
- Max. rating: F5 tornado
- Duration: 27 hours, 32 minutes

Overall effects
- Fatalities: 72
- Injuries: 1,203
- Damage: >$52.5 million
- Areas affected: Central and Southern United States
- Part of the tornado outbreaks of 1968

In mid-May 1968, a significant and deadly tornado outbreak struck most of the central and southern United States. Producing 46 tornadoes, the outbreak killed at least 72 people, including 45 in Arkansas alone. The outbreak also produced two tornadoes in Iowa that were rated F5 on the Fujita scale. It was one of the deadliest tornado outbreaks in the United States since the 1960s and is one of the deadliest outbreaks in Iowa history.

== Meteorological synopsis ==
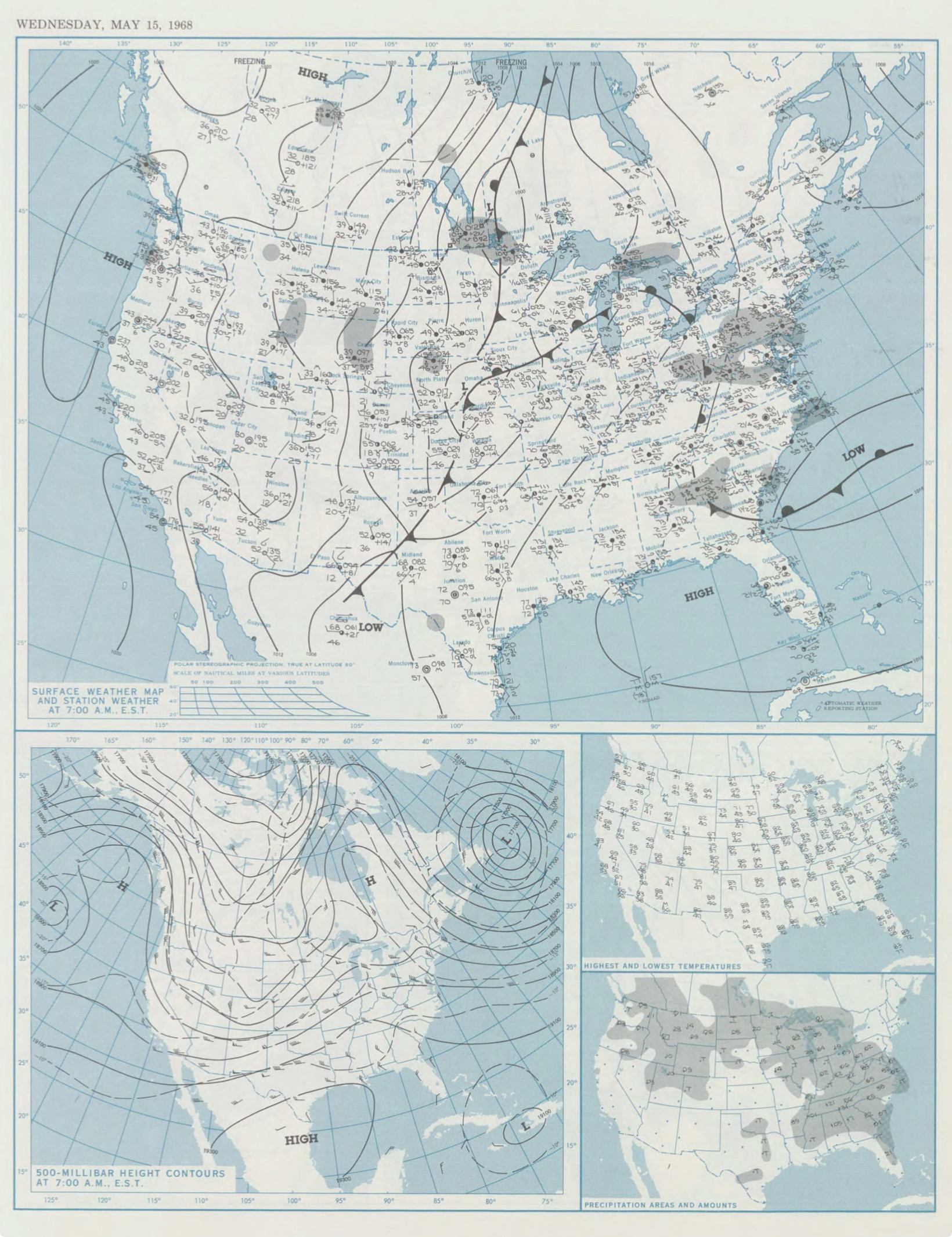
Surface weather analysis map on May 15

Severe weather activity started during the afternoon of May 15 as a low pressure system crossed the area. The first tornado touchdowns were across the Midwestern States including the two Iowa F5s that hit central and eastern parts of the state about 45 minutes apart during the late afternoon. Both tornadoes killed 18 in total. The first F5 tornado moved through five counties and 65 miles (105 km). It affected the town of Charles City just before 5 PM destroying much of the area. Damage figures were pegged at $30 million in Charles City alone while $1.5 million of damage was recorded elsewhere. This tornado killed 13 and injured 462 others. The second F5 tornado affected Fayette County and damaged or destroyed nearly 1000 homes. The hardest hit areas were Oelwein and Maynard where homes were completely swept away from their foundations. Five people were killed while 156 others were injured. Damage was estimated at $21 million. These were two of four F5 tornadoes across the country in 1968, the others being in southeastern Ohio on April 23 and in southwestern Minnesota on June 13. The next F5 tornadoes in Iowa took place in Jordan in 1976, and in Parkersburg, in 2008.

After the first tornadoes struck the Northern Plains, activity developed further south during the evening hours including several deadly tornadoes in Arkansas. One of the tornadoes touched down west of Jonesboro before hitting the Craighead County city itself at around 10 PM CDT. The tornado caught most residents by surprise since most of the warning systems failed and killed at least 34. One more person was killed in neighboring Jackson County. The tornado was the deadliest in Arkansas since an F4 tornado that affected White County on March 21, 1952, killing 50.

State	Total	County	County total
Arkansas	45	Baxter	3
Arkansas	45	Craighead	34
Arkansas	45	Independence	7
Arkansas	45	Jackson	1
Illinois	8	De Witt	4
Illinois	8	St. Clair	4
Indiana	1	Wabash	1
Iowa	18	Fayette	5
Iowa	18	Floyd	13
Totals	72		
All deaths were tornado-related

The same city was hit by another destructive tornado five years later killing at least three and injuring 250 others while leaving much more destruction throughout the city than the 1968 event. The damage figures were about $62 million in 1973 dollars. Another F4 tornado just to the west of Jonesboro killed 7 in Oil Trough in Independence County and 3 others were killed in Baxter County.

The activity ceased across the Deep South when the final tornadoes of the first part of the outbreak touched down across the Metropolitan Memphis area and northern Mississippi as well as in the Fort Wayne, Indiana area. A smaller tornado outbreak from the same system took place across Oklahoma and Texas during the following day where seven tornadoes touched down including an F3 in Wilbarger County, Texas.

In addition to the 45 fatalities in Arkansas and 18 in Iowa, the outbreak killed eight in Illinois and one in Indiana.

== Confirmed tornadoes ==
Confirmed tornadoes by Fujita rating
FU	F0	F1	F2	F3	F4	F5	Total
0	5	20	10	7	2	2	46

=== May 15 event ===
List of confirmed tornadoes
F#	Location	County	Time (UTC)	Path length	Damage
Minnesota
F2	NW of Northfield to S of New Trier	Rice, Dakota	2028	15.4 miles (24.6 km)	One woman was injured when a barn collapsed onto her.
F0	NW of Hutton	Freeborn	2200	0.1 miles (0.16 km)	Brief tornado caused minor damage.
F1	SW of Dodge Center	Dodge	2207	7.8 miles (12.5 km)	Tornado damaged outbuildings on 3 farms.
F1	W of West Concord	Steele, Dodge	2240	16.6 miles (26.6 km)	Outbuildings were damaged on 7 farms.
F1	W of Newburg	Fillmore	2345	8.4 miles (13.4 km)	Tornado damaged 3 farms and a church.
Illinois
F3	E of Easton to SW of Emden	Mason, Logan	2030	12.6 miles (20.2 km)	15 homes were damaged or destroyed beyond repair, with near F4 damage in some areas. Trailers and smaller buildings were destroyed and scattered.
F1	S of Waynesville to S of Farmer City	De Witt	2200	25.4 miles (40.6 km)	4 deaths – Passed along the south edge of Wapella, destroying 3 homes and several buildings on multiple farms. A library in Waynesville was torn apart. Grazulis states that this tornado produced near F4 damage, despite the official F1 rating.
F3	E of Milford	Iroquois	2350	7.1 miles (11.4 km)	One home had its roof blown off and was torn apart. 25 loaded freight cars were blown from the tracks. Barns and trailers were destroyed as well.
F3	SE of Freeburg	St. Clair	0245	2 miles (3.2 km)	4 deaths – A trailer park was completely destroyed at Freeburg, where 4 people were killed. Frame homes and other structures were badly damaged.
Kansas
F3	NE of Louisburg, KS	Miami, KS, Cass, MO	2045	2.7 miles (4.3 km)	Tornado struck 8 farms in two states. One farm home was unroofed and torn apart. Barns were destroyed as well along the path.
Iowa
F5	NE of Hampton to SE of Chester	Cerro Gordo, Franklin, Butler, Floyd, Chickasaw, Howard	2110	62.1 miles (99.4 km)	See article on this tornado – 13 deaths – In Charles City, 13 people died, 450 were injured, and $30 million damage occurred. 372 homes were destroyed, 188 sustained major damage, and 356 sustained minor. A new housing project was leveled. 58 businesses were destroyed, 90 sustained major damage, and 46 sustained minor damage. Multiple homes in town were completely swept away. Farms were swept away in rural areas outside of town, and intense cycloidal scour marks were visible in fields. A department store was flattened and the downtown area on Main St. was heavily damaged. All 8 churches and 3 of the city schools were damaged or destroyed. All the bars were spared. The police station was heavily damaged. 1250 vehicles were destroyed. In Elma, nearly $1.5 million damage occurred. Five homes and 20 cars were demolished and the Roman Catholic Church was unroofed. Along the path, 13 people were killed, 462 injured, and total damages were estimated at $31.5 million.
F5	Oelwein to W of Fayette	Fayette	2157	13.1 miles (21 km)	See article on this tornado – 5 deaths – Tornado struck the towns of Oelwein and Maynard. Homes in both communities were completely swept away. Churches, businesses, and schools in Oelwein were badly damaged and destroyed. Nearly 1,000 homes in total were damaged or destroyed by the tornado along its path. 34 people were hospitalized as a result of their injuries.
F1	W of Jackson Junction	Fayette	2158	0.3 miles (0.5 km)	Brief tornado touchdown with minor damage.
F1	Audubon area	Audubon	2245	2 miles (3.2 km)	Barns were destroyed and house windows were blown out.
F2	S of Vernon Springs	Howard	2315	4.7 miles (7.5 km)	The roof was torn off of a home and a concrete block garage was destroyed. Barns were destroyed as well.
Missouri
F2	W of Pittsville	Johnson	2130	5.2 miles (8.3 km)	Tornado struck 7 farms, destroying barns and outbuildings. A gas station was destroyed and one home had its roof torn off.
F1	NW of Richmond	Ray	2145	3.6 miles (5.8 km)	Tornado struck 5 farms, damaging barns and sheds.
F2	Fayetteville to Concordia	Johnson, Lafayette	2200	12.3 miles (19.7 km)	Large barns and outbuildings were destroyed.
F1	S of Blackburn	Lafayette, Saline	2200	4.9 miles (7.8 km)	Four farms sustained outbuilding damage. Trees and roofs were damaged, and a car was flipped by the tornado.
F1	S of Alba	Jasper	2300	2.5 miles (4 km)	Tornado damaged or destroyed structures on 3 farms. Tree damage occurred and a car was flipped, injuring the 3 occupants.
F1	W of Hillsboro	Jefferson	0140	5.9 miles (9.4 km)	Tornado caused tree damage along its path.
F2	SW of Neelyville	Butler	0250	0.2 miles (0.32 km)	Brief tornado destroyed two buildings and flipped a truck onto a station wagon. 1 person was injured.
F1	S of Campbell	Dunklin	0320	1.5 miles (2.4 km)	Tornado caused damage to treetops before lifting, then touching down fully in a rural area.
Indiana
F2	Mooresville area	Hendricks, Morgan	2145	8.8 miles (14.1 km)	30 homes were damaged or had their roofs torn off, and multiple trailers were destroyed in Hazelwood. 20 additional homes were damaged at Lake Bodona, with some unroofed or nearly destroyed.
F2	N of West Lafayette	Tippecanoe	0351	0.1 miles (0.16 km)	Two small buildings were destroyed.
F2	N of Beard	Clinton	0430	0.1 miles (0.16 km)	A barn and farm machinery were destroyed near Beard.
F3	S of Wabash to E of Fort Wayne	Wabash, Huntington, Allen	0602	50.3 miles (80.5 km)	1 death – 13 trailers were destroyed, one of which was thrown across a highway, resulting in a fatality. 35 homes were damaged, 15 of them in New Haven. Twenty garages and barns were destroyed, and 3 planes were damaged at Wabash airport. 15 people were injured.
Ohio
F1	SE of Wooster	Wayne	2315	1 miles (1.6 km)	Barns and outbuildings were destroyed.
F2	Dalton area	Wayne	0000	1 miles (1.6 km)	Barns and outbuildings were destroyed.
Arkansas
F3	NE of Mountain Home	Baxter	0030	7.3 miles (11.7 km)	3 deaths – 20 homes and 12 trailers were destroyed. 4 businesses and 15 other homes were badly damaged. Boats, docks, and resorts were damaged at Lake Norfolk.
F1	NE of Viola	Fulton	0115	0.1 miles (0.16 km)	Tornado caused damage in the Viola area where two trailers were flipped and a recreation hall sustained roof and wall damage. The roof was blown off of Viola School and several homes in Viola were damaged as well.
F4	N of Oil Trough	Independence	0236	0.3 miles (0.5 km)	7 deaths – Tornado struck Oil Trough, destroying over half of the town. An implement company, a grocery store, and the post office were destroyed. The high school was badly damaged as well. A church with 60 people inside was badly damaged, but only one injury occurred there.
F4	E of Tuckerman to SW of Blytheville	Jackson, Craighead, Mississippi	0245	20.9 miles (33.4 km)	35 deaths – Tornado first struck the south side of Tuckerman before tearing through Jonesboro. At least 164 homes were destroyed in Jonesboro, and multiple others were damaged. Several fatalities occurred when vehicles were thrown from a road and wrapped around trees. The tornado also impacted the towns of Fairview, Nettleton, and Manila. The tornado was not on the ground between Jonesboro and Manila, but the NWS (National Weather Service) counts the event as one tornado. The downtown area of Manila was destroyed, and Nettleton School was completely destroyed as well.
Tennessee
F1	Memphis area (southeast)	Shelby	0520	0.1 miles (0.16 km)	Tornado remained over open country.
F1	Germantown area	Shelby	0715	0.1 miles (0.16 km)	Brief tornado reported.
F1	SW of Dixonville	Shelby	0750	0.1 miles (0.16 km)	No damage reported.
Mississippi
F2	SW of Lewisburg	DeSoto	0620	5.2 miles (8.3 km)	Two concrete block houses were badly damaged and another was pushed several feet from its foundation. An additional 3 homes were destroyed, one was unroofed, and 3 others were damaged. A mobile home, antique shop, implement company, garage, and chicken house were all destroyed. A barn was unroofed, and many trees and power poles were downed. 6 people were injured.
F1	E of Bowman	Tate	0640	0.1 miles (0.16 km)	Tornado uprooted multiple trees.
F1	NW of Taska	Marshall	0730	0.1 miles (0.16 km)	One truck was pushed from the road, another jackknifed, and two others were involved as the tornado briefly moved down the highway.
Source: Tornado History Project Storm Data - May 15, 1968

=== May 16 event ===
List of confirmed tornadoes
F#	Location	County	Time (UTC)	Path length	Damage
Oklahoma
F0	SE of Wilson	Carter	2015	0.1 miles (0.16 km)	
F0	NW of Overbrook	Love	2115	0.1 miles (0.16 km)	
F0	NW of Taylor	Cotton, Stephens	2143	0.1 miles (0.16 km)	
F1	W of Marietta	Love	2345	0.1 miles (0.16 km)	
F0	NE of Asphaltum	Jefferson	0000	0.1 miles (0.16 km)	
Texas
F1	NW of Bellevue	Clay	2015	0.1 miles (0.16 km)	
F3	SW of Vernon	Wilbarger	2110	2 miles (3.2 km)	A home lost its roof and two walls.
Source: Tornado History Project Storm Data - May 16, 1968

=== Charles City—Elma, Iowa ===
Charles City—Elma, Iowa
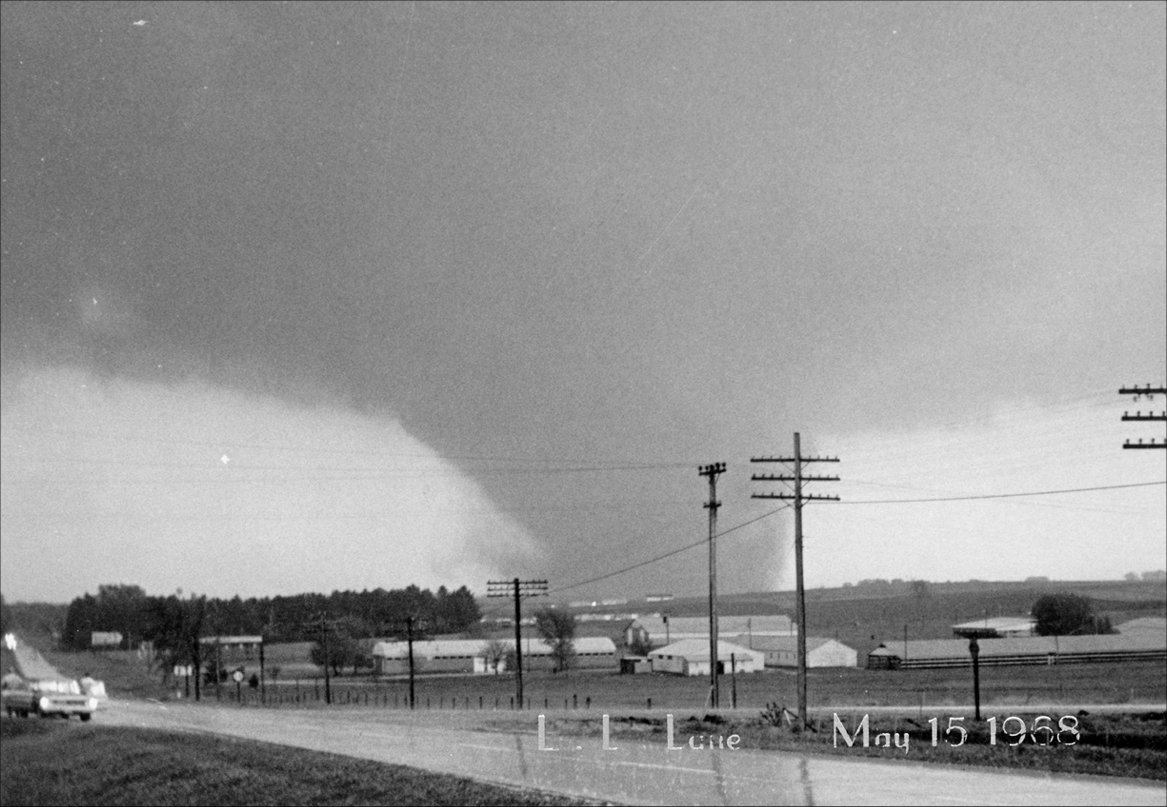
- The tornado as it was 2 miles southwest of Charles City

Meteorological history
- Formed: May 15, 1968, ~4:10 p.m. CDT (UTC–05:00)
- Dissipated: May 15, 1968, ~5:40 p.m. CDT (UTC–05:00)
- Duration: 1 hour, 30 minutes

F5 tornado
- on the Fujita scale
- Highest winds: >261–300 mph (420–483 km/h)

Overall effects
- Fatalities: 13
- Injuries: 462

This extremely powerful and large tornado was first spotted near Hansell at around 4:10 P.M. At one point, two tornadoes were seen simultaneously on the ground. Several farms were destroyed before the tornado appeared to lift near Marble Rock. As the tornado approached Charles City, it intensified and enlarged. Thirteen people were killed and 415 were injured by the tornado in Charles City. The tornado then moved to Elma, causing severe damage there. The tornado then turned to the north and dissipated 14 miles north of Elma. 372 homes were destroyed in Charles City, and the damage total was $30 million in Charles City and $1.5 million in Elma.

=== Oelwein—Maynard, Iowa ===
Oelwein—Maynard, Iowa
- The large multi-vortex tornado just outside of Oelwein

Meteorological history
- Formed: May 15, 1968, ~4:57 p.m. CDT (UTC–05:00)
- Dissipated: May 15, 1968, ~5:40 p.m. CDT (UTC–05:00)
- Duration: 43 minutes

F5 tornado
- on the Fujita scale
- Highest winds: >261 mph (420 km/h)

Overall effects
- Fatalities: 5
- Injuries: 156

This tornado occurred less than an hour after the Charles City F5 touched down. In Oelwein, it killed two people and destroyed 68 homes, with hundreds more sustaining taking varying amounts of damage. In addition, it destroyed or damaged every business in the area. Some people reported more than one tornado on the ground. After moving north-northeast for over 20 miles, it hit the western side of Maynard, leveling five blocks of the town, including several homes and a newly-completed Lutheran church. Two fatalities occurred in Maynard. In total, 156 injuries were recorded, and damage estimates were $21 million.

=== Jonesboro—Nettleton—Manila, Arkansas ===
Jonesboro—Nettleton—Manilla, Arkansas
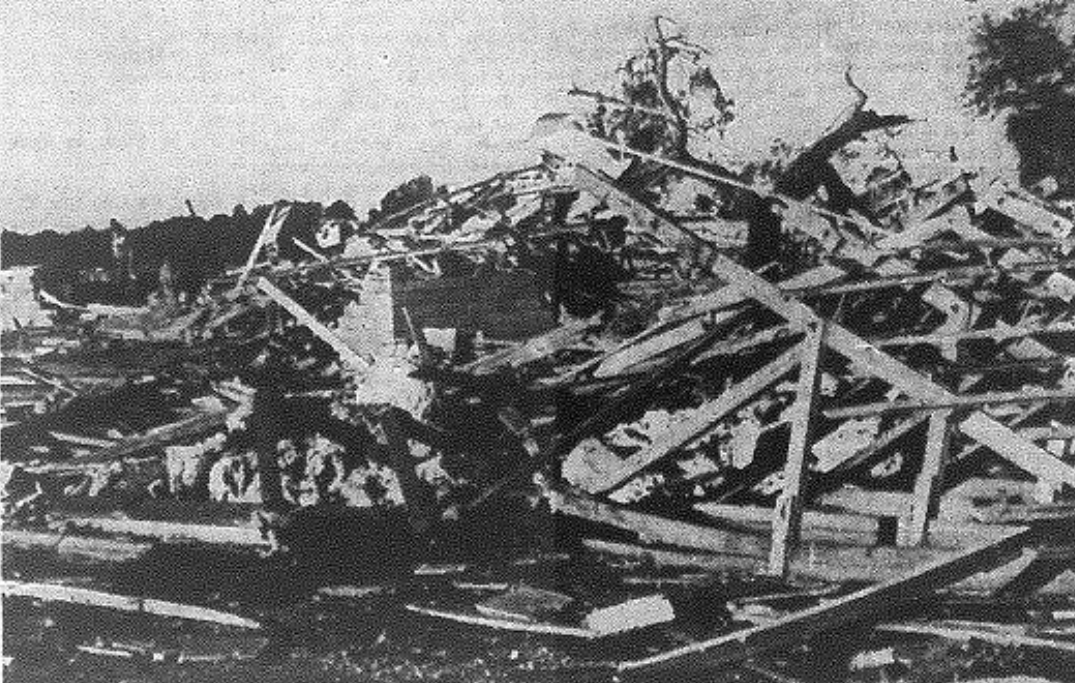
- The ruins of the Nettleton Elementary School in Jonesboro after the tornado

Meteorological history
- Formed: May 15, 1968, ~9:45 p.m. CDT (UTC–05:00)
- Dissipated: May 15, 1968, ~10:50 p.m. CDT (UTC–05:00)
- Duration: 1 hour

F4 tornado
- on the Fujita scale
- Highest winds: 207–260 mph (333–418 km/h)

Overall effects
- Fatalities: 35
- Injuries: 364

This violent tornado, also referred to as the First Jonesboro tornado, would be the deadliest of the outbreak, killing 35 people and injuring over 300. Some of those fatalities were caused by cars being wrapped around trees. 170 homes and some businesses were destroyed by the tornado. Nettleton High School was almost completely destroyed by the tornado. Large amounts of cotton crops were destroyed by heavy rain associated with the storm. In addition to Jonesboro, the tornado ran through the downtown area of Manila, destroying a large section of it. Despite the tornado having been observed to lift between Jonesboro and Manila, the NWS counts this as one tornado.

== See also ==
- List of North American tornadoes and tornado outbreaks
