= List of schools struck by tornadoes =

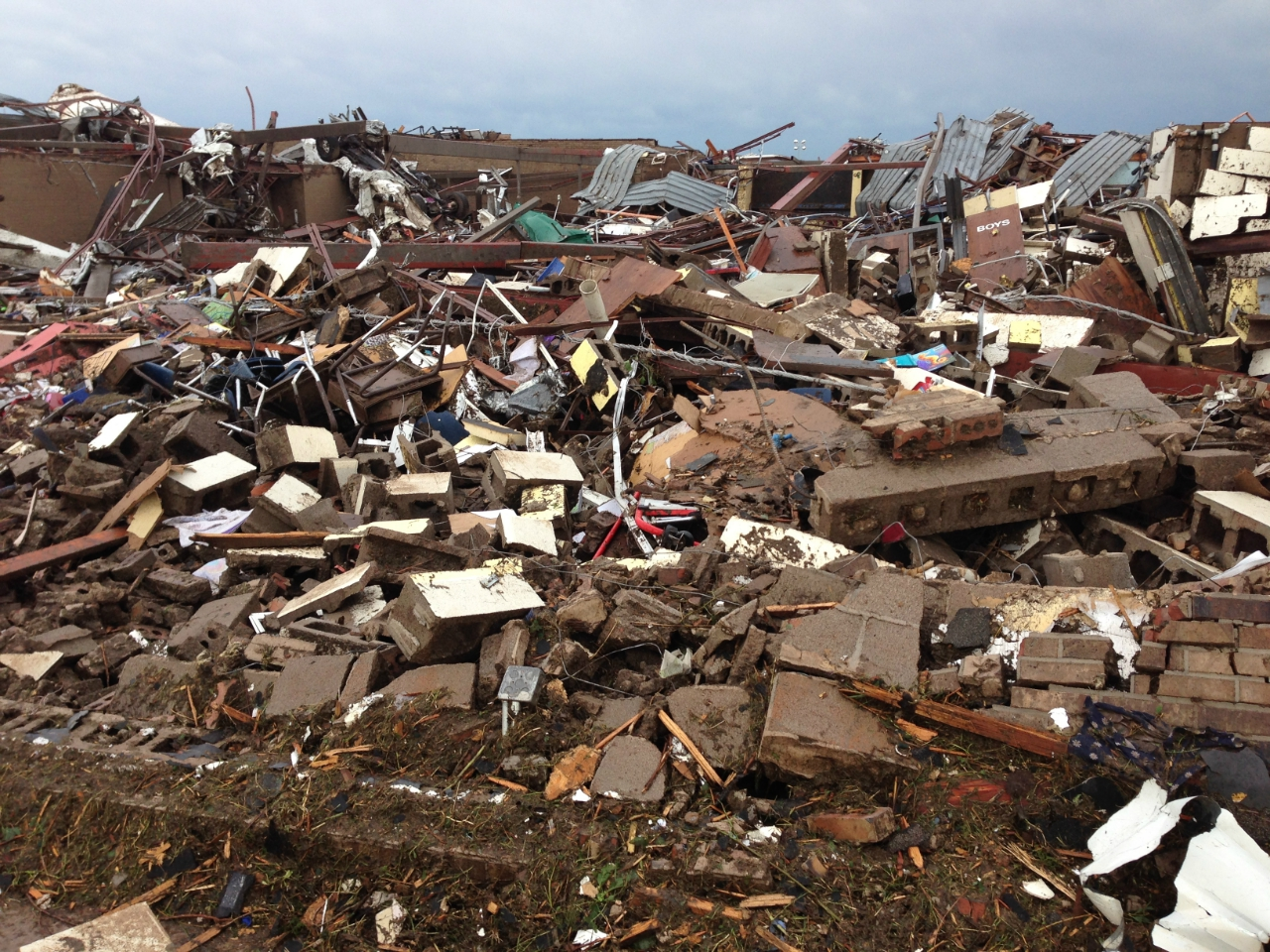
Major structural damage at Briarwood Elementary School following the 2013 Moore tornado

This is a list of tornadoes which struck primary and secondary schools or post secondary colleges or universities, organized by the tornado's intensity. These scales—the Fujita scale, the Enhanced Fujita scale, and the International Fujita scale—are used to rate and estimate the damage done by a tornado.

== F5/EF5/IF5 tornadoes ==
Tornado	F#/EF#/IF# (school)	Location (school)	Notes
1953 Flint–Beecher tornado	F0–F5 (Note: The exact rating for the damage to the school was not released by the National Weather Service. The maximum rating for damage to the school is the tornado’s rating.)	Beecher High School	The school was heavily damaged as it was directly struck.
1955 Udall tornado	F0–F5	Udall Public School	The school building was badly damaged by the tornado, with beams snapped and blown away.
1957 Spring Hill–Ruskin Heights tornado	F0–F5	Ruskin Heights High School	The school was badly damaged.
1957 Fargo tornado	F0–F5	Shanley High School	The school was severely damaged.
1957 Fargo tornado	F0–F5	Sacred Heart Academy	The school was severely damaged.
1957 Fargo tornado	F0–F5	North Dakota State University	Buildings on the university campus were severely damaged.
1966 Topeka tornado	F0–F5	Washburn University	Washburn University took a direct hit, and many large stone buildings on campus were badly damaged or destroyed. A 300-pound section of stone wall was torn from one building and thrown two miles away. One vehicle on campus was reportedly lofted over the top of the university's ROTC building, before coming to rest on the 50-yard line of the football field.
1968 Hansell-Charles City tornado	F0–F5	McKinley School	The school was destroyed by the tornado.
1968 Hansell-Charles City tornado	F0–F5		A school was damaged or destroyed by the tornado.
1968 Hansell-Charles City tornado	F0–F5		A school was damaged or destroyed by the tornado.
1968 Oelwein tornado	F0–F5		A middle school was destroyed by the tornado.
1968 Oelwein tornado	F0–F5		An elementary school was destroyed by the tornado.
1968 Tracy tornado	F0–F5	Tracy Elementary School	The school was completely destroyed by the tornado.
1970 Lubbock tornado	F0–F5	Estacado High School	The school was damaged by the tornado.
1970 Lubbock tornado	F0–F5	Thompson Junior High School	The school was damaged by the tornado.
1970 Lubbock tornado	F0–F5	Arnett Elementary School	The school was damaged by the tornado.
1970 Lubbock tornado	F0–F5	Jackson Elementary School	The school was damaged by the tornado.
1970 Lubbock tornado	F0–F5	Hunt Elementary School	The school was damaged by the tornado.
1970 Lubbock tornado	F0–F5	K. Carter Elementary School	The school was damaged by the tornado.
1970 Lubbock tornado	F0–F5	McWhorter Elementary School	The school was damaged by the tornado.
1970 Lubbock tornado	F0–F5	North Avenue U Elementary School	The school was damaged by the tornado.
1970 Lubbock tornado	F0–F5	Sanders Elementary School	The school was damaged by the tornado.
1974 Depauw–Daisy Hill tornado	F0–F5	Morgan Elementary School	The tornado struck the school, destroying several classrooms and throwing cars on top of the building. Fortunately, the children and faculty, who were huddled in the hallways, were not injured. A woman was crushed by a school bus that flew into a ditch she was sheltering in.
1974 Xenia tornado	F0–F5	Xenia High School	The school was completely destroyed by the tornado. As the tornado struck the school, it was videotaped and was observed to have "as many as five subvortices merging into one" tornado. Students in the school, practicing for a play, took cover in the main hallway seconds before the tornado dropped a school bus onto the stage where they had been practicing and extensively damaged the school building.
1977 Birmingham tornado	F0–F5	Daniel Payne College	The tornado caused $1,300,000 of damage ($6.907 million adjusted) to Daniel Payne College, which shut down several years afterwards.
1990 Plainfield tornado	F4	Plainfield High School	The tornado directly struck the high school, killing a science teacher and two maintenance workers. Students who had been out practicing for the fall football programs ran into the high school to take shelter a few minutes before the storm hit. After an alarm was pulled by a dean in the main office, the volleyball players preparing for a game in the gymnasium rushed to the nearest door and took shelter in the hallway. It has been reported that as soon as the last player was through the door, a coach quickly closed it, only for it to be immediately ripped back off by the storm. The gymnasium proceeded to fall apart and crash down, which filled the gap in the doorway. They took shelter in the same hallway as the football team, and once the tornado had passed, that was the only hallway left standing in the building. The tornado then demolished the Plainfield School District Administration building, where the wife of a custodian was killed.
1990 Plainfield tornado	F4	St. Mary Immaculate Church and School	The tornado completely destroyed the church and school, killing the principal of the school, a music teacher, and the son of the cook at the rectory.
1990 Plainfield tornado	F4	Grand Prairie Elementary School	The school sustained significant damage.
1998 Oak Grove-Birmingham tornado	F3	Oak Grove High School	The high school portion sustained major structural damage, and the elementary school portion was destroyed. The school building was rebuilt two years later and reopened a mile away from the damaged area. No one inside the school was killed, but a group of cheerleaders practicing at the school's gymnasium escaped disaster with only minor injuries when a wall prevented a portion of the roof from falling on them.
1999 Bridge Creek–Moore tornado	F4	Westmoore High School	An honors ceremony was being held at Westmoore High School at the time of the tornado. Adequate warning time allowed those at the school to seek shelter, however, and more than 400 adults and students attending the awards ceremony at the school's auditorium were moved to the main building, sheltering in reinforced hallways and bathrooms. Ultimately, Westmoore High sustained heavy damage and dozens of cars that were in the school's parking lot were tossed around, some of which were completely destroyed or thrown into nearby homes. No injuries took place at the school, though a horse was found dead between a couple of destroyed cars in this area.
2007 Greensburg tornado	EF4	Delmar Day Elementary School	The school was completely leveled nearby homes were flattened at EF4 intensity.
2007 Greensburg tornado	EF4	Greensburg High School	The school was mostly destroyed by the tornado, sustaining high-end EF4 damage. One wing of the school was completely flattened, despite being well-built and constructed with triple-thick masonry walls. Numerous homes were swept away across from the high school, four of which were well-bolted to their foundations, warranting an EF5 rating at those residences.
2008 Parkersburg–New Hartford tornado	EF4	Aplington-Parkersburg High School	The school sustained EF4 structural damage, and reinforced concrete light poles near the school were snapped and dragged along the ground by the tornado, indicative of extremely intense low-level inflow winds.
2011 Hackleburg–Phil Campbell tornado	EF3	Hackleburg High School	The school had its roof removed, exposing the interior. Nearby vehicles were tossed up to 200 yards.
2011 Hackleburg–Phil Campbell tornado	EF3	Hackleburg Middle School.	The school was badly damaged but not destroyed. Nearby vehicles were tossed up to 200 yards.
2011 Hackleburg–Phil Campbell tornado	EF3	Hackleburg Elementary School	The school was badly damaged. Nearby vehicles were tossed up to 200 yards.
2011 Rainsville tornado	EF4	Plainview High School	The school sustained $10 to $15 million (2011 USD) in damage to the main school buildings, gymnasiums, sports fields, cafeteria, as well as the DeKalb County Schools Coliseum. Nearby homes were swept clean from their foundations, their debris having been strewn up to a mile away and a school bus was mangled beyond recognition and stripped down to its chassis.
2011 Joplin tornado	EF4	St. Mary's Catholic Church and School	The building was almost completely leveled, with the only portions of the church and school remaining being the steel cross and a small portion of the metal roof.
2011 Joplin tornado	EF4	Joplin High School	Portions of the high school were completely destroyed. A school bus was tossed on top of the destroyed bus garage. Surrounding businesses, homes, and buildings were totally destroyed. Many open fields were covered with boards, limbs, steel beams, fencing, and other materials embedded deeply into the ground.
2011 Joplin tornado	EF3	East Middle School	The school had its gymnasium badly damaged and an auditorium demolished, large spans of roof were removed.
2013 Moore tornado	EF4	Briarwood Elementary School	The school was completely destroyed. Right before destroying the school, the tornado heavily scouring an open grassy field. The National Weather Service originally rated the damage to the school EF5, but further evaluation and a 2014 study published by the American Meteorological Society revealed evidence of poor construction at the school, and the rating was downgraded to EF4. Remarkably, no fatalities occurred at the school. Two 12,000-gallon water tanks that were also swept off of the Orr Family Farm grounds were thrown into this area; the roof of Briarwood Elementary was struck by one of them − potentially aiding in compromising the building's structural integrity as it bent the steel girders that held up the roof − shortly before the main vortex struck the building, while the other fell onto and destroyed a home a few blocks east of the school.
2013 Moore tornado	EF4	Plaza Towers Elementary School	The tornado completely destroyed the school at EF4 intensity, where seven children were killed when a cinder block wall collapsed on top of them. More than a dozen homes in a subdivision just to the south of Plaza Towers Elementary were swept cleanly away, though they were revealed to have been nailed rather than bolted to their foundations, and damage to this subdivision was subsequently rated EF4, though the tornado was likely extremely violent as lawns in this area were completely scoured down to bare soil. Entire blocks of homes were flattened, trees were completely debarked and denuded, vehicles were thrown and mangled, and the ground was severely scoured in other residential areas nearby, with the damage also rated EF4 in these areas. Most of the fatalities from the tornado occurred in the Plaza Towers neighborhood of Moore.
2013 Moore tornado	EF3	Highland East Jr. High	Highland East Jr. High's main building was spared, but the separate gymnasium building was completely destroyed at EF3 intensity, and a set of lockers from the structure was lofted and thrown a considerable distance into a nearby neighborhood.
2013 Moore tornado	EF1	Moore Public Schools	The Moore Public Schools administration building, a converted former hospital located a few blocks to the east, was struck by the tornado and destroyed at EF1 intensity.

== F4/EF4/IF4 tornadoes ==
Tornado	F#/EF#/IF# (school)	Location (school)	Notes
1967 Belvidere tornado	F0–F4	Belvidere High School	The tornado struck as buses, which had previously been loaded with students from the elementary school, were being loaded with high schoolers. Twelve buses were flipped over and students were "flung like leaves" into an open field. 13 fatalities and 300 injuries occurred at the high school. Another school bus was struck by the tornado in McHenry County, Illinois south of Harvard, but no fatalities occurred.
1967 Belvidere tornado	F0–F4	Immanuel Lutheran School	The school took a "direct hit" as students had sheltered in the basement.
1967 Lake Zurich tornado	F0–F4	Seth Paine Elementary School	The school was destroyed.
1991 Oolagah tornado	F0–F4	Oolagah School Complex	The school was severely damaged, with buses from the school being tossed nearly 1 mi (1.6 km) away, into Fourmile Creek.
2012 Henryville tornado	EF4	Henryville school complex	The school was in the process of dismissing as the tornado approached the community, and sustained EF4 structural damage including total destruction of its cafeteria. Most of the staff and students had already left the area by the time the tornado struck. One bus driver saved numerous student's lives by returning to the school. The small group of students that returned and took shelter in the school building survived without injury, despite being inside as it was destroyed around them. Many cars in the school parking lot were thrown and destroyed, one of which had a wooden beam speared through its hood and out of its undercarriage. The school security cameras recorded video of the tornado striking the building, and it is still viewable on YouTube to this day. Low-level winds in this area were so intense that debris was found wedged underneath plastic reflective strips in the parking lot. School buses were thrown hundreds of feet away, and two were ripped from their chassis. One bus was thrown through the front wall of a nearby restaurant. Numerous homes in and around Henryville were destroyed, and some were flattened or swept from their foundations. The tornado was at its most intense stage when in the Henryville area, with winds estimated at 175 mph (282 km/h). Damage surveyors found evidence of very intense multiple vortices as the tornado entered the community. Massive deforestation occurred in heavily wooded areas around town, and debris from Henryville was found as far east as Ohio.
2021 South Moravia tornado	IF3		A school was damaged at IF3 intensity.
2023 Rolling Fork–Silver City tornado	EF1	Rolling Fork Elementary School	The school sustained damage, including damage to <20% of the roof.
2023 Rolling Fork–Silver City tornado	EF1	South Delta High School	The school sustained damage, including damage to <20% of the roof.
2025 Rio Bonito do Iguaçu tornado	F4	Centro Estudantil Rio Bonito do Iguaçu	This large brick school was completely destroyed by the tornado.
2025 Rio Bonito do Iguaçu tornado	F2	Colégio Estadual Ludovica Safraider	Moderate to significant damage to the school's library, laboratory and secretary room, with the gymnasium being completely destroyed.
2025 Rio Bonito do Iguaçu tornado	F2	Colégio Estadual Ireno Alves dos Santos	Received only moderate damage to the school's roof.

== F3/EF3/IF3 tornadoes ==
Tornado	F#/EF#/IF# (school)	Location (school)	Notes
2005 Birmingham tornado	IF3	Ladypool Primary School	The school suffered significant damage to its roof, and suffered collapse of its Martin & Chamberlain tower.
2021 Fultondale tornado	EF1	Fultondale High School	One off-campus student was killed while sheltering in their basement. The school was demolished following the tornado, opening a new campus in 2023.
2021 Naperville–Woodridge tornado	EF1	Meadow Glens Elementary School	"Considerable" property damage occurred.
2022 Andover tornado	EF2	Prairie Creek Elementary School	$6 million of damage occurred directly to the school. A video from the school's surveillance system documented the tornado.
2023 Covington tornado	EF?	Crestview Elementary and Middle School	Prior to the tornado, classes had dismissed early due to the severe weather threat.
2024 Sulphur tornado	EF0	Sulphur High School	The school sustained minor structural damage, and Sulphur Public School's bus fleet was destroyed.
2024 Lucama, North Carolina tornado	EF3	Springfield Middle School	The tornado reached peak intensity of 140 mph (230 km/h) at the Springfield Middle School in Lucama, North Carolina. The school sustained major damage, with multiple walls being blown out and sections of the structure's roof being removed. Shortly after affecting the school, the tornado's sole fatality occurred at a two-story house.

== F2/EF2/IF2 tornadoes ==
Tornado	F#/EF#/IF# (school)	Location (school)	Notes
2006 Childress tornado	F1	Childress High School	The gymnasium suffered significant damage.
2024 Frazeysburg tornado	EF0	Frazeysburg Elementary School	The school sustained minor damage as the tornado was dissipating.
2024 Northern Tallahassee tornado	EF1	Lively Technical Center	Significant tree damage observed on the institution's campus.
2024 Northern Tallahassee tornado	EF1	Tallahassee Community College	Significant tree damage observed on the institution's campus.
2024 Northern Tallahassee tornado	EF1	Florida State University	Significant tree damage observed on campus. Destroyed the tent housing for the FSU Flying High Circus.
2024 Southern Tallahassee tornado	EF1	Sabal Palm Elementary School	
2024 Southern Tallahassee tornado	EF1	Florida A&M University	
2025 Rolla tornado	EF?	Wyman Elementary School	
2025 Rolla tornado	EF?	B W Robinson State School	
2025 Rolla tornado	EF?	Rolla Middle School	
2025 Rolla tornado	EF?	Rolla Technical Institute	
2025 Mascoutah tornado	EF0	Mascoutah Middle School	A large portion of the roof was removed.
2025 Perryville tornado	EF2	Perryville High School	Three buildings were damaged, one of which had its exterior walls on the top floor knocked in. Extensive roof damage occurred to the other two buildings.
2025 Neoga tornado	EF1	Neoga Elementary School	Significant damage occurred.
2025 Winterboro tornado	EF2	Winterboro High School	The high school's gym was totally destroyed and a school bus from the parking lot was lofted onto the roof of the gym. A wooden power pole in the school's parking lot was also broken and fell onto a building on the campus.
2025 Cash tornado	EF0	Westside High School	The school's gymnasium had its roof damaged.

== F1/EF1/IF1 tornadoes ==
Tornado	F#/EF#/IF# (school)	Location (school)	Notes
1989 Coldenham tornado	F1	East Coldenham Elementary School	A weak tornado collapsed a large brick wall and it fell onto several children, killing nine. One more child was killed in a distracted driving incident at the school days later.
2024 Shawnee tornado	EF1	Mill Valley High School	Damage occurred to the school's concession stand and an administrative building near the track and football field. Debris from this area was carried a few neighborhoods away.
2024 Lyons tornado	EF0	Lyons School Complex	The Lyons Elementary, Middle and High school complexes sustained minor EF0 damage.
2024 Greenville tornado	EF0	Greenville High School	The school's football field was damaged.
2024 Morton tornado	EF0	Morton High School	The school sustained minor damage and trees near the school were snapped or uprooted.
2025 Tuscumbia tornado	EF1	RE Thompson Intermediate School	A large portion of the high school's roof was torn off.
2025 Ada tornado	EF?	Willard Elementary School	An emergency manager reported a portion of the school's roof was missing.
2025 Unionville tornado	EF0	Porter Ridge High School	The school's tennis court, two storage sheds, and a light pole were damaged. Tree branches around the school were also snapped.
2025 Vardaman tornado	EF0	Vardaman Elementary School	The school's metal roof was torn off.
2025 Gary tornado	EF1	Frankie Woods McCullough Academy	One third of the school's gymnasium roof was peeled off. The roof of the school was damaged as well.
2025 Princeton tornado	EF0	Princeton Community High School	A tornado damaged the roof of the high school.
2025 Waterloo tornado	EF0	Waterloo High School	A greenhouse on the high school's campus was damaged.
2025 Remy tornado	EF0	Liberty School	The school had some roof damage.
2025 Lairdsville tornado	EF1	Hamilton College	Trees were snapped on the western edge of the campus.
2025 Columbia tornado	EF0	Columbia State Community College	One building suffered some roof damage, trees were uprooted and some tree branches were snapped on campus.

== F0/EF0/IF0 tornadoes ==
Tornado	F#/EF#/IF# (school)	Location (school)	Notes
2024 OSU Hatfield Tornado	EF0	Hatfield Marine Science Center	Caused damage to concrete shingles and displaced objects weighing up to 1,100 lb (500 kg).
2024 St. James tornado	EF0	Lucy W. Elementary School	The tornado damaged small outbuildings at the school as well as to a light pole at a football stadium. A school camera captured the tornado moving over a school building.
2024 Spearman tornado	EF0	Spearman High School	The tornado damaged a small shed and utility trailer at the school.
2024 Englewood–Jackson Park tornado	EF0	Englewood STEM High School	The school sustained minor damage as the tornado formed.
2024 Plainfield, Illinois tornado	EF0	Plainfield South High School	The school sustained minor damage.
2025 Lynchburg tornado	EF0	Chatfield College	Several trees were downed on campus.
2025 Blakely tornado	EF0	Early County Elementary School	Minor damage occurred to the outside of the school.
2025 Prescott Valley tornado	EF0	Pronghorn Ranch Middle School	A landspout struck the school, removing some shingles from its roof. A garbage can on the schoolgrounds was also lofted 50 ft (15 m) to 100 ft (30 m) in the air.
