= Tornadoes of 1968 =

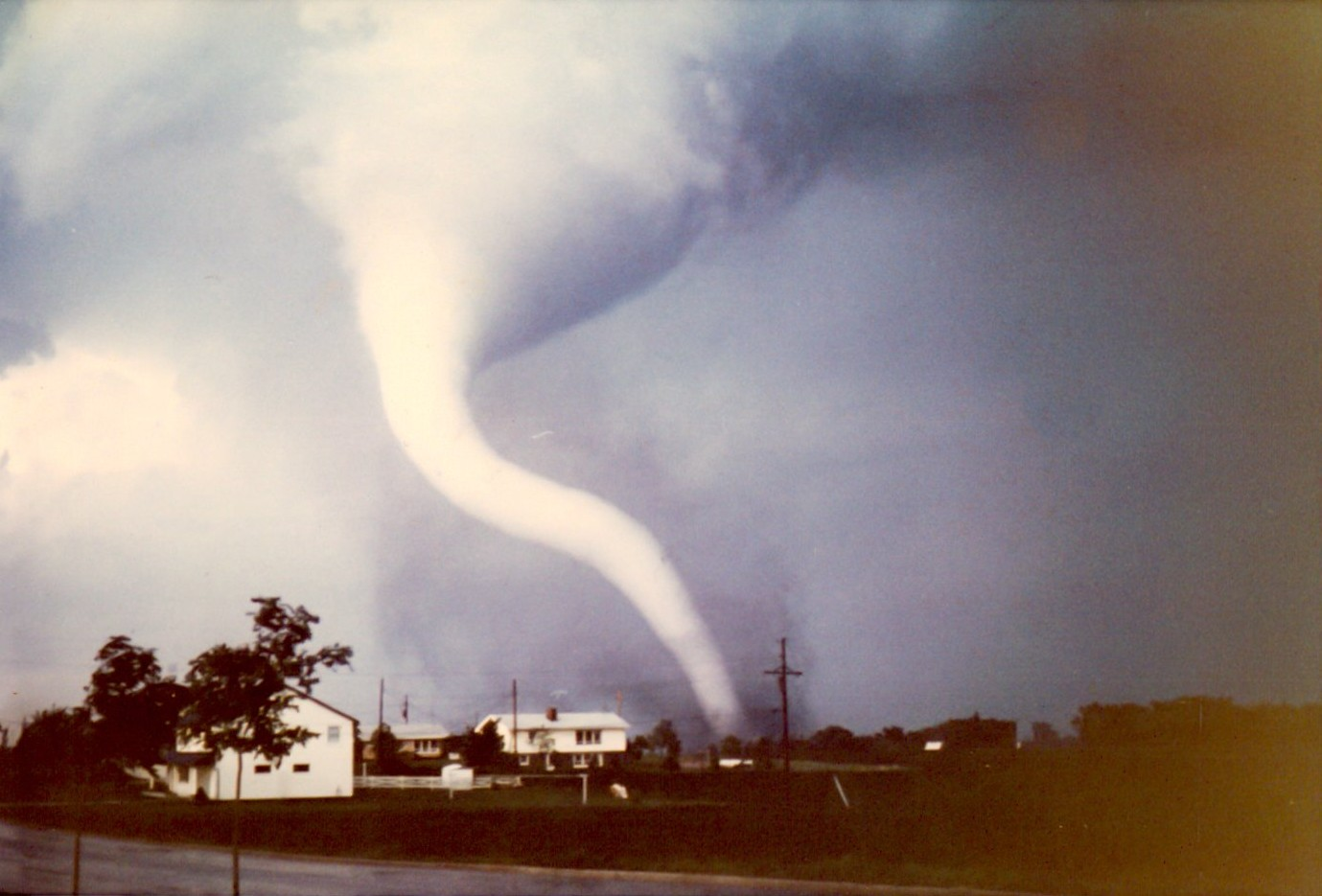
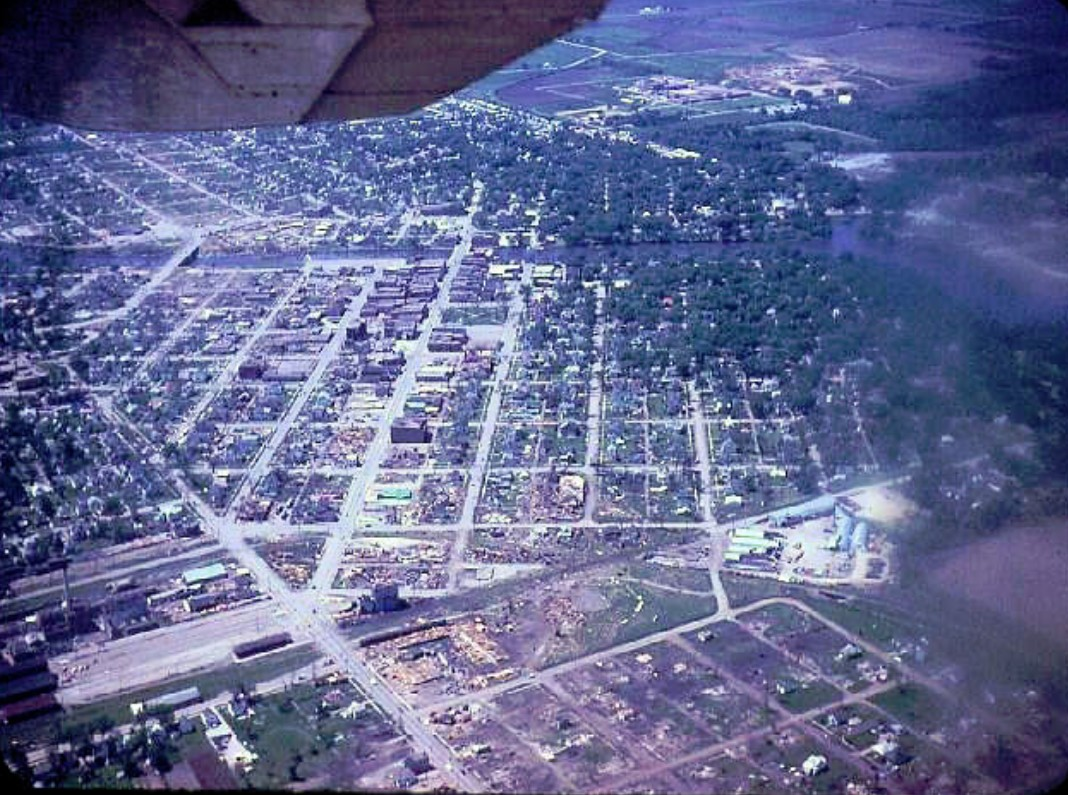
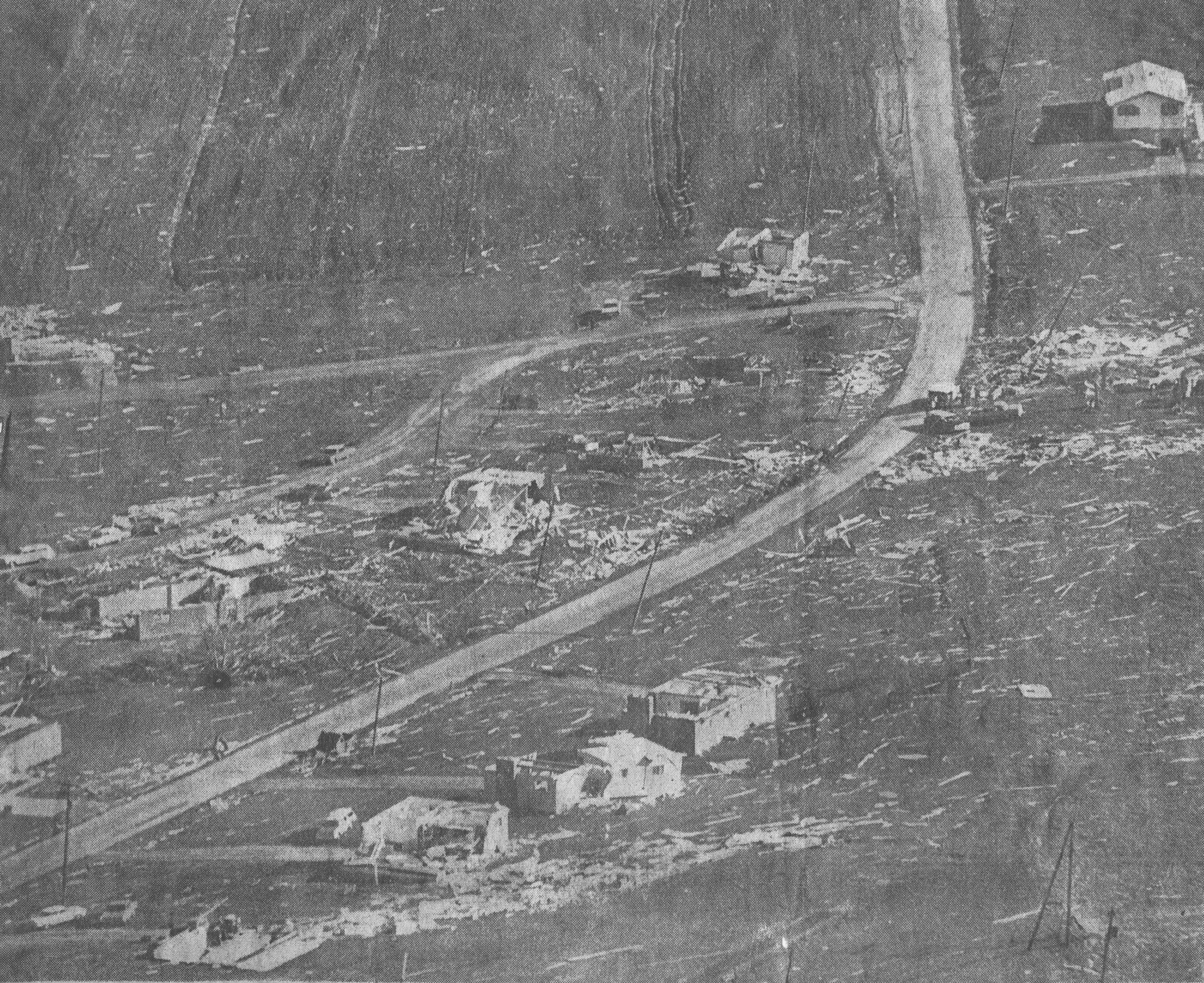
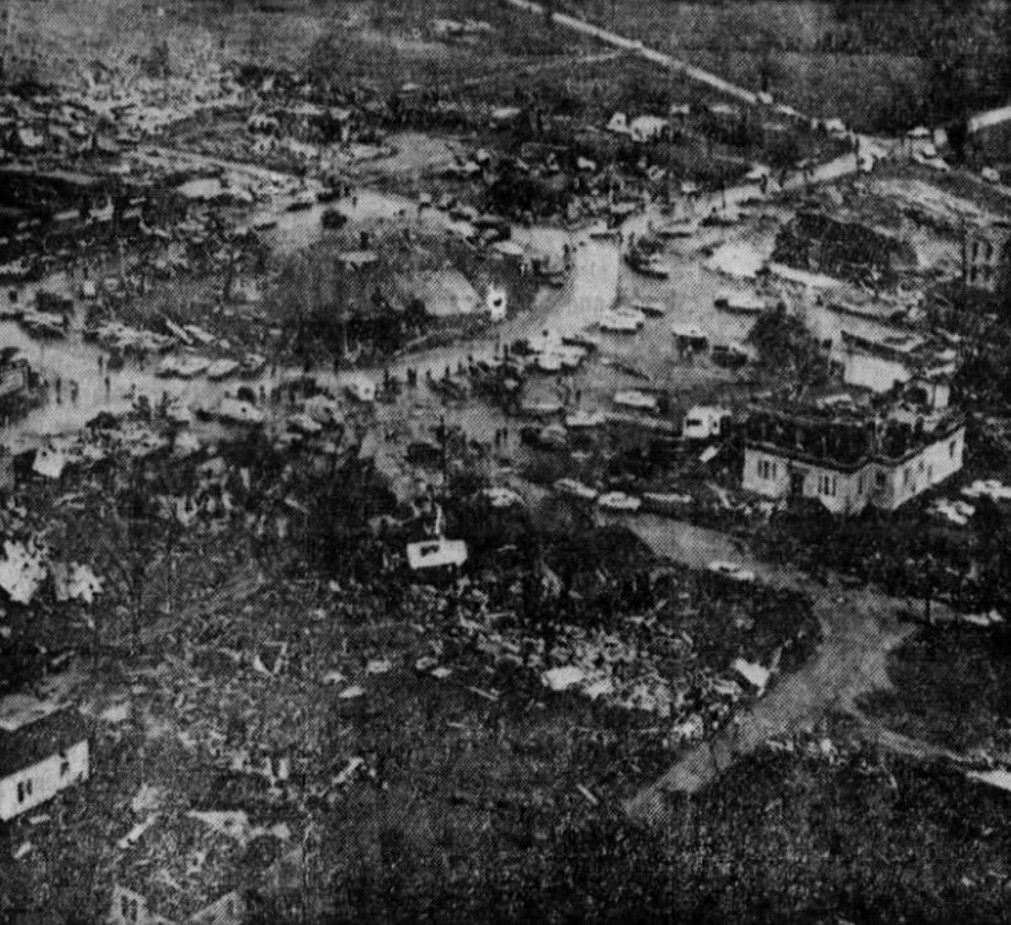
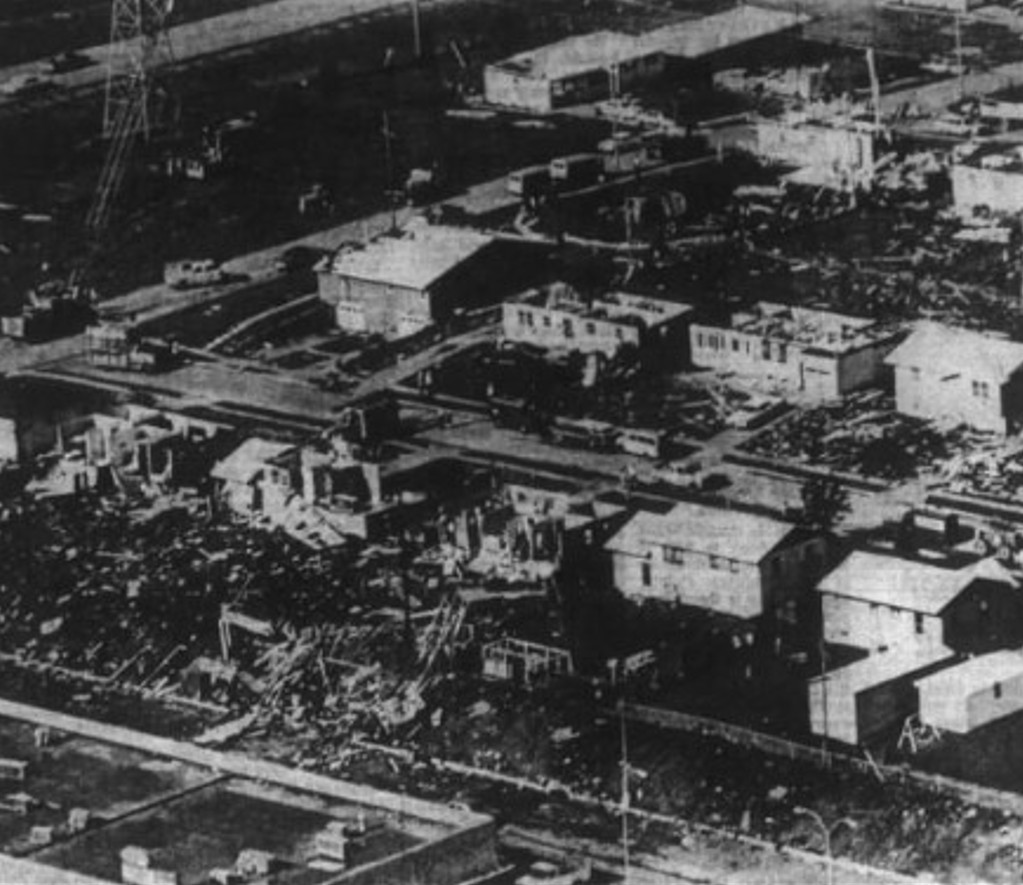
- Clockwise from top: A violent F5 tornado in Tracy, Minnesota on June 13; Damage in Wheelersburg, Ohio after an F5 tornado on April 23; Damage in Omaha, Nebraska after an F3 tornado on August 18; An F5 multi-vortex tornado outside of Oelwein, Iowa on May 15; Violent damage in Greenwood, Arkansas after an F4 tornado on April 19; An aerial of Charles City, Iowa after an F5 tornado on May 15.
- Timespan: January –December 1968
- Maximum rated tornado: F5 tornado: Wheelersburg, Ohio on April 23; Charles City, Iowa on May 15; Oelwein/Maynard, Iowa on May 15; Tracy, Minnesota on June 13
- Tornadoes in U.S.: 657
- Damage (U.S.): Unknown
- Fatalities (U.S.): 131
- Fatalities (worldwide): >135

This page documents the tornadoes and tornado outbreaks of 1968, primarily in the United States. Most tornadoes form in the U.S., although some events may take place internationally. Tornado statistics for older years like this often appear significantly lower than modern years due to fewer reports or confirmed tornadoes. Two F5 tornadoes struck Iowa in the Charles City and Maynard areas, combined they claimed 18 lives and this was one of very few cases in history where two F5 or EF5 tornadoes hit the same state, on the same day.

== Events ==
Fatal United States tornadoes in 1968
- Approximate touchdown location of killer tornadoes in 1968
Summary of tornadoes
- April 3 – Arkansas (5 deaths)
- April 3 – Arkansas (1 death)
- April 3 – Tennessee (4 deaths)
- April 3 – Kentucky (2 deaths)
- April 19 – Arkansas (14 deaths)
- April 23 – Kentucky, Ohio (6 deaths)
- April 23 – Ohio (1 death)
- April 23 – Ohio (7 deaths)
- May 15 – Iowa (13 deaths)
- May 15 – Iowa (5 deaths)
- May 15 – Illinois (4 deaths)
- May 15 – Arkansas (3 deaths)
- May 15 – Arkansas (7 deaths)
- May 15 – Illinois (4 deaths)
- May 15 – Arkansas (35 deaths)
- May 16 – Indiana (1 death)
- June 10 – Minnesota (1 death)
- June 11 – Michigan (1 death)
- June 13 – Minnesota (9 deaths)
- July 30 – Florida (2 deaths)
- August 19 – Wisconsin (2 deaths)
- November 9 – Florida (2 deaths)
- November 17 – Alabama (1 death)
- December 27 – Mississippi (1 death)
Total fatalities: 131

=== United States yearly total ===
Confirmed tornadoes by Fujita rating
FU	F0	F1	F2	F3	F4	F5	Total
0	192	251	163	39	8	4	657

== January ==
There were 5 confirmed tornadoes in the United States in January, all rated F1 or F0.

== February ==
There were 7 confirmed tornadoes in the United States in February.

=== February 19 ===
FU	F0	F1	F2	F3	F4	F5
0	0	1	1	0	0	0

An F2 tornado moved through the North Miami Beach, Florida, destroying two homes, damaging 144 homes and businesses, and injuring 21 people. An F1 tornado also struck west of Miami.

== March ==
There were 28 confirmed tornadoes in the United States in March.

=== March 11–12 ===
FU	F0	F1	F2	F3	F4	F5
0	5	4	4	1	0	0

An outbreak of 14 recorded tornadoes struck the Southeastern United States, producing an F3 tornado in Natchitoches Parish, Louisiana.

== April ==
There were 102 confirmed tornadoes in the United States in April.

=== April 2–4 ===
FU	F0	F1	F2	F3	F4	F5
0	2	10	15	2	2	0

A multi-day tornado outbreak produced strong tornadoes from Texas and Iowa to Alabama. The outbreak started with several tornadoes touching down in the Texas Panhandle and Oklahoma on the evening of April 2 to shortly after midnight on April 3. An F2 tornado near Newlin, Texas destroyed barns and killed cattle. The most intense part of the outbreak took place on the afternoon and evening of April 3. An F4 tornado passed southeast of Star City, Arkansas to near Gould, destroying farm homes and killing 5 people. The tornado crossed Arkansas Highway 81 (now U.S. Route 425), tossing cars and peeling up a 60 foot (18 m) section of asphalt. A second F4 tornado traveled for 40 miles (64 km) across western Kentucky, damaging or destroying more than 50 homes and killing a couple in Calloway County. An F3 tornado killed 4 people in Brighton and Atoka, Tennessee and damaged or destroyed about 100 trailers in Millington as well as many rural homes along its path. Another F3 tornado near Paragould, Arkansas swept away a small house, killing a person inside, and severely damaged a large factory.

=== April 19 ===
FU	F0	F1	F2	F3	F4	F5
0	0	6	4	1	1	0

A short-lived but powerful F4 tornado destroyed most of Greenwood, Arkansas, killing 14 people and injuring 270. The town was left as a "sea of rubble."

=== April 21–24 ===
FU	F0	F1	F2	F3	F4	F5
0	3	10	8	2	2	1

A tornado outbreak struck portions of the Midwestern and Southern United States. The worst day of the outbreak was April 23, which spawned the strongest and deadliest tornadoes of the event. A violent tornado, which may have started in Kentucky, damaged or destroyed 550 homes in Wheelersburg, Ohio, killing 7 people and destroyed more homes in Gallipolis. This tornado was officially rated F5, but its rating is disputed as tornado expert Thomas P. Grazulis assigned a rating of F4. A long-tracked F4 tornado traveled more than 70 miles across parts of portions Kentucky and Ohio. The tornado first devastated Falmouth, Kentucky, where it killed 4 people, injured 350, destroyed 180 houses, and damaged another 200. The tornado heavily damaged most of the buildings in Dover. It crossed into Ohio near Ripley, where another person was killed and 30 homes were damaged. In all this tornado killed 6 people. Grazulis notes that it may have reached F5 strength. Another F4 tornado destroyed 35 homes near Newtonsville, Ohio, killing 1 person and injuring 29.

== May ==
There were 142 confirmed tornadoes in the United States in May.

=== May 6 ===
FU	F0	F1	F2	F3	F4	F5
0	3	2	1	1	0	0

A small tornado outbreak impacted the Texas Panhandle and western Oklahoma. Three tornadoes touched down near Pampa, Texas. One of these tornadoes struck Miami, Texas at F3 strength, destroying a high school and several homes and businesses and injuring 6 people. Sirens in Miami sounded early enough that most residents were able to take shelter before the tornado struck. An F2 tornado destroyed barns and tore the roof from a farm home near Vinson, Oklahoma.

=== May 13 ===
FU	F0	F1	F2	F3	F4	F5
0	2	9	3	2	0	0

A tornado outbreak hit the Great Plains. A long-tracked F3 tornado or tornado family traveled for 140 miles across western and central Kansas, injuring 5 people. Another F3 tornado destroyed 7 homes and a church near Konawa, Oklahoma. One house was carried 250 yards (230 m).

=== May 15–16 ===
FU	F0	F1	F2	F3	F4	F5
0	5	20	10	7	2	2

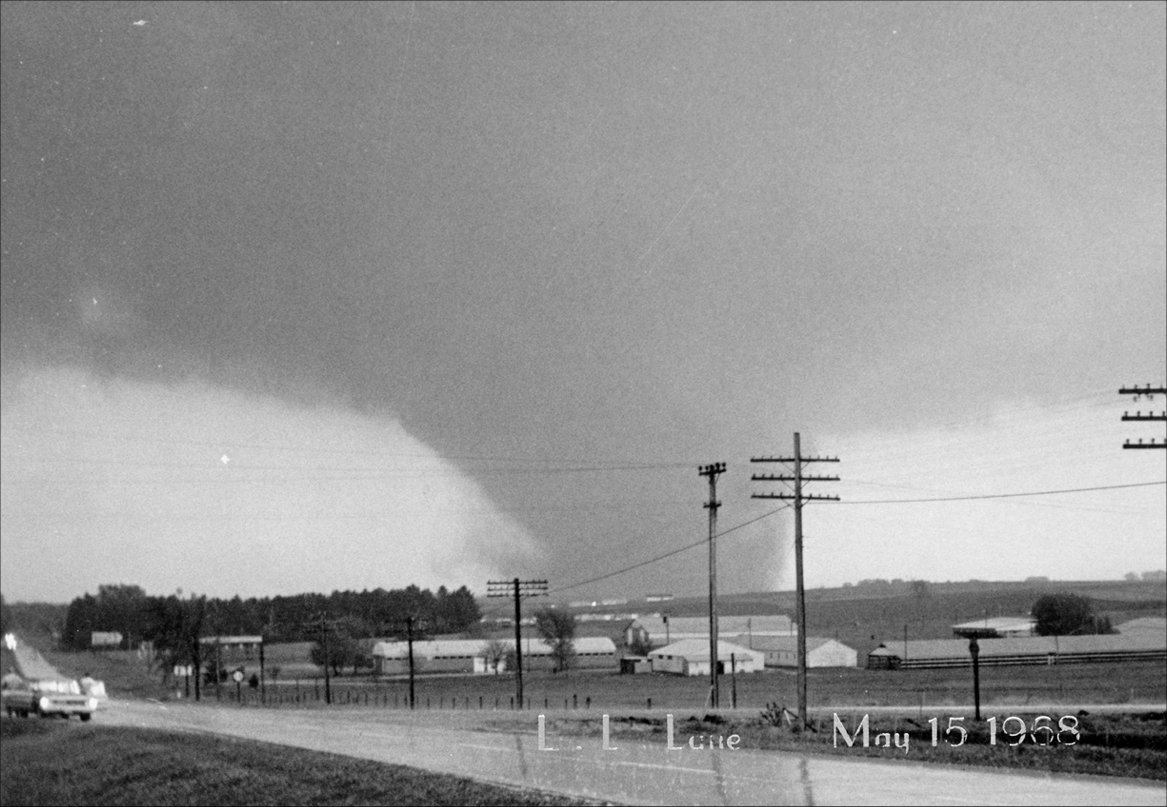
An F5 tornado near Charles City, Iowa on May 15, 1968.

A low pressure system produced a major tornado outbreak across the Midwestern and Southern United States. It was one of only a few outbreaks to have produced more than one F5 tornado. The first F5 tornado struck Charles City and Elma, Iowa, killing 13 people and damaging or destroying nearly 924 homes with a damage cost of $30 million. The second F5 tornado, also in Iowa, stuck Oelwein and Maynard, killing 5 people. Homes were leveled and swept away in both towns. Two F4 tornadoes struck Arkansas. The first destroyed much of Oil Trough, killing 7 people and leaving most buildings in town with some form of damage. The second F4 tornado struck Tuckerman, Jonesboro, and Nettleton, killing 35 people. There were 164 homes destroyed in Jonesboro. Some of the deaths were in cars that were swept of a highway and wrapped around trees. An F3 tornado completely destroyed a trailer park in Freeburg, Illinois, killing 4 people. A tornado killed 4 people in Wapella, Illinois, causing near-F4 damaged and tore apart the library in Waynesville. While officially rated F1, Grazulis rated this tornado F3 and noted near-F4 damage. Another F3 tornado destroyed trailers, cottages, and small homes in and near Henderson, Arkansas, killing 3 people. Tornadic activity continued past midnight into May 16. An F3 tornado traveled on a long, skipping path from near Wabash, Indiana to New Haven, killing 1 person.

== June ==
There were 136 confirmed tornadoes in the United States in June.

=== June 10–11 ===
FU	F0	F1	F2	F3	F4	F5
0	4	4	4	0	0	0

Scattered tornadoes occurred across the United States on June 10 and June 11. An F1 tornado destroyed a trailer near Mora, Minnesota on June 10, killing a person inside. An F2 tornado killed another person near Pompeii, Michigan.

=== June 13 ===
FU	F0	F1	F2	F3	F4	F5
0	6	0	4	0	0	1

A small tornado outbreak struck the Midwestern United States. The most notable storm was an F5 tornado that hit Tracy, Minnesota, destroying 111 homes and killing 9 people. Some farms and businesses were completely swept away. An F2 tornado destroyed cottages near Arnolds Park, Iowa, injuring 17 people.

=== June 24–25 ===
FU	F0	F1	F2	F3	F4	F5
0	8	9	8	0	0	0

A 2-day outbreak produced tornadoes across a broad region stretching from Colorado to Florida and Pennsylvania. An F2 tornado near Granada, Colorado severely damaged a feed lot, killing cattle, and caused destruction to three farms, a cemetery, and paving company, injuring 1 person. A second F2 tornado near Concord, Ohio destroyed several barns and tore the roof from a house, injuring 5 people. A person was injured by a third F2 tornado near Holbrook, Pennsylvania.

== July ==
There were 56 confirmed tornadoes in the United States in July.

=== July 10 (Europe) ===
FU	F0	F1	F2	F3	F4	F5
2	0	0	1	1	1	0

A cold front brought storms to France and Germany. An F4 tornado struck tore through the Black Forest and Pforzheim, killing 2 people and injuring 300. An F3 tornado struck Uberach.

=== July 30 ===
FU	F0	F1	F2	F3	F4	F5
0	1	2	3	0	0	0

A low pressure system produced a small tornado outbreak in the Midwest with two strong tornadoes in Nebraska. The first destroyed a house near Waco. A second tornado destroyed 2 farms and a power substation near Stromsburg. While both tornadoes were officially rated F2, Grazulis rated them F3, noting near-F4 damage from the Stromsburg tornado. A separate storm system over the southeastern U.S. spawned another F2 tornado, which killed 2 people in Port Charlotte, Florida.

== August ==
There were 66 confirmed tornadoes in the United States in August.

=== August 18–20 ===
FU	F0	F1	F2	F3	F4	F5
0	0	6	2	2	1	0

A record setting 500 hPa trough moved across the northern United States, producing a multi-day tornado outbreak.

On August 18 at 6:45 PM, an F3 tornado struck Omaha, Nebraska, damaging 46 homes and causing one serious and eight minor injuries in addition to $10.5 million in damage (2016 dollars). 14 homes were destroyed and 32 sustained major damage. A department store and grocery store also sustained major damage.

The next day, an F4 tornado struck Pound, Wisconsin and dissipated just outside Marinette, destroying farms near both towns and killing 2 people. An F3 tornado in Weare, New Hampshire destroyed a barn, tossed a trailer, and damaged a horsemanship training school. Several horses were injured and one was thrown over 100 feet (30 m).

== September ==
There were 25 confirmed tornadoes in the United States in September.

== October ==
There were 14 confirmed tornadoes in the United States in October.

=== October 31 (Italy) ===
A tornado struck the Plain of Catania, Sicily, killing 2 people and injuring 100.

== November ==
There were 44 confirmed tornadoes in the United States in November.

=== November 3 ===
FU	F0	F1	F2	F3	F4	F5
0	0	0	2	2	0	0

A small but intense tornado outbreak struck the Gulf Coast. A long-track F3 tornado or tornado family cut across part of southern Alabama and the Florida Panhandle. The worst damage and most of the 18 injuries were in Saraland, Alabama where 15 houses and 5 trailer homes were destroyed and another 240 homes and trailers were damaged. Another 3 houses were destroyed in Bay Minette and a school complex and industrial site were severely damaged in Baldwin County. An F3 tornado in Gulfport, Mississippi damaged a manufacturing site and several homes and smashed a trailer into a building. An F2 tornado in White Sand, Mississippi destroyed a tenant house and downed 60 acres of trees.

=== November 5 ===
FU	F0	F1	F2	F3	F4	F5
0	1	1	0	1	0	0

An F3 tornado hit Victoria, Texas, damaging 25 homes, 5 of which lost roofs and exterior walls. A brief tornado, officially rated F0, touched down northeast of downtown Houston and tore the roof from a dormitory at Southern Bible College. Another tornado, rated F1, destroyed six trailers in one trailer park and rolling several trailers in another, and injuring 15 people. Grazulis rated all of these tornadoes F2

=== November 9 ===
FU	F0	F1	F2	F3	F4	F5
0	0	6	3	0	0	0

An outbreak produced at least 9 tornadoes across central and southern Florida. An F2 tornado or tornado family that touched down near Naples knocked down a 705 foot (215 m) tower, destroyed a hunting camp, can killed 2 people at a farm labor camp. Another F2 tornado destroyed 2 small homes and damaged 20 in Venice, injuring 2 people. an F1 tornado or tornado family started in Tampa and traveled to near Orlando, injuring 3 people.

=== November 17–18 ===
FU	F0	F1	F2	F3	F4	F5
0	0	5	2	2	0	0

A low pressure system produced tornado from Louisiana to Georgia. An F3 tornado struck Clanton, Alabama, destroying 15 homes, 3 trailers, and 10 barns and damaging several homes and a motel. A fisherman drowned on Lake Mitchell and 24 people were injured. Another F3 tornado tossed cars and tore apart a home near Waycross, Georgia. an F2 tornado near Needham, Alabama injured 2 people, destroyed a trailer, and damaged a house.

== December ==
There were 32 confirmed tornadoes in the United States in December.

=== December 27–28 ===
FU	F0	F1	F2	F3	F4	F5
0	3	5	8	1	0	0

A low pressure system spawned tornadoes from Texas to Georgia. An F2 tornado hit Stover, Mississippi, killing 1 person, leveling a house, and tearing several others apart. An F2 tornado destroyed a barn and damaged homes and businesses in Carthage, Mississippi. Another F2 tornado hit Columbus and Caledonia, Mississippi, where it destroyed one business, tore part of the roof from a gym, and rolled a trailer, wrapping its top around a telephone pole.

== See also ==
- Tornado
  - Tornadoes by year
  - Tornado records
  - Tornado climatology
  - Tornado myths
- List of tornado outbreaks
  - List of F5 and EF5 tornadoes
  - List of North American tornadoes and tornado outbreaks
  - List of 21st-century Canadian tornadoes and tornado outbreaks
  - List of European tornadoes and tornado outbreaks
  - List of tornadoes and tornado outbreaks in Asia
  - List of Southern Hemisphere tornadoes and tornado outbreaks
  - List of tornadoes striking downtown areas
  - List of tornadoes with confirmed satellite tornadoes
- Tornado intensity
  - Fujita scale
  - Enhanced Fujita scale
