= 1968 Charles City tornado =

Violent F5 tornado in 1968

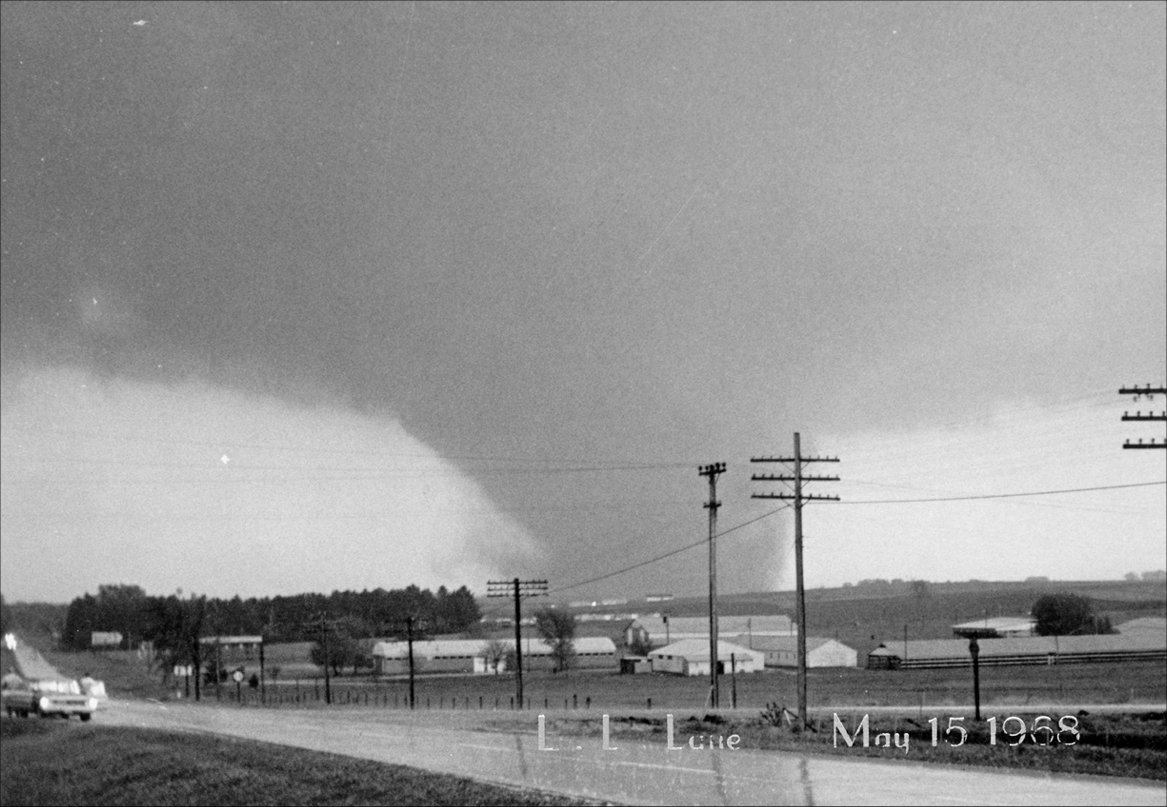
- The tornado as it was 2 miles southwest of Charles City

Meteorological history
- Formed: May 15, 1968, ~4:10 p.m. CDT (UTC–05:00)
- Dissipated: May 15, 1968, ~5:40 p.m. CDT (UTC–05:00)
- Duration: 1 hour, 30 minutes

F5 tornado
- on the Fujita scale
- Highest winds: >261–300 mph (420–480 km/h)

Overall effects
- Fatalities: 13
- Injuries: 462
- Areas affected: Northern Iowa, including northern Hansell, outskirts of Hampton, Charles City, Elma and Aredale
- Part of the Tornadoes of 1968 and Tornado outbreak of May 1968

During the evening hours of May 15, 1968, an extremely powerful and violent multi-vortex tornado hit the communities of Hansell, Hampton, Charles City, Elma and Aredale across central and northern Iowa. It killed 13, injured 462, and was one of the largest tornadoes ever recorded in the state. Hundreds of buildings were destroyed, primarily in the town of Charles City. Damage estimates were of more than $20 million.

== Tornado summary ==
The tornado was first sighted by a farmer northeast of Hansell at around ~4:10, and it immediately began to track northeastward, heading towards Aredale. The tornado crossed the intersection that connects Timber Avenue and 175th Street. It then crossed Vine Avenue, damaging structures at an unknown intensity. It entered the Thorn Apple Woods, damaging trees before crossing 200th Street northeast of the woods. It also crossed Franklin Avenue before entering the limits of Aredale. The tornado hit the Bailey Farm southwest of Aredale, heavily damaging a farm but causing no fatalities. The tornado then tracked through the McKinney Farm, destroying almost every building on the property. At around this time, another tornado was briefly reported on the ground, but disappeared shortly after.

The tornado then left the limits of southern Aredale, and hit the Landers Farm, located 5 miles northeast of Aredale. Debris from the farm was found over half a mile away. The tornado then began to track through relatively unpopulated areas, crossing multiple unknown streets before tracking parallel to 110th Street for a brief period of time. The tornado began to turn to the north, hitting Floyd Line Street and crossing multiple other streets, downing power lines and damaging structures. The tornado began to rapidly intensify as it hit Kirkwood Road, and crossed 280th Street before beginning to run almost diagonally to Marble Rock.

As the tornado tracked passed areas west of Marble Rock, a funnel cloud was briefly seen before dissipating. Another tornado then touched down east of Marble Rock, and would stay on the ground until around 4 miles southwest of Charles City. The tornado crossed the intersection of Miner Avenue and 260th Street, again intensifying. The tornado would pass just south of Oakwood, crossing multiple roads before tracking directly across Avenue of the Saints and entering the city limits of Charles City. The tornado then crossed 215th Street at F5 intensity, entering downtown Charles City.

The tornado began to turn northward in the center of Charles City at ~4:47 PM. The tornado caused extreme damage on 2nd Street, and directly impacted the Charles City City Hall. It obliterated a row of houses located on the southern end of Kelly Street, before crossing Blunt Street. Heavy damage was documented and observed in northern Charles City, and intense ground scouring occurred, suggesting wind speeds of 200–300 mph (320–480 km/h). As the tornado began to track out of Charles City, it hit 13th Avenue, damaging structures and other buildings.

The tornado crossed Triumph Avenue and Underwood Avenue northeast of Charles City, and narrowly avoided the Northeast Iowa Regional Airport. The tornado passed west of Doubleday, causing damage to farms and other structures. The tornado then passed Victory Avenue and crossed an unnamed river before moving south of Nilesville. The tornado also tracked directly east of Colwell, causing an unknown amount of damage to structures.

The tornado then started to track through sparsely populated areas of rural northern Iowa, damaging farms but causing no deaths. Wind speeds in this area were initially estimated by the United States Weather Bureau to be at 528 mph (850 km/h) based on intense ground scouring, but were later trimmed down. The tornado tracked west of Alta Vista before hitting eastern Elma, heaving damaging many buildings in its path. The tornado also moved in-between Saratoga and Davis Corners, crossing State Highway 9, before turning slightly northward directly west of Lime Springs. The tornado lifted at ~5:40 PM.

In all, the tornado tracked a total of 62.1 miles, killing 13 and injuring 462. The tornado had a maximum width of 0.34 of a mile, and reached F5 intensity at least twice along its path.

== Aftermath ==
=== Damage ===
The tornado caused extreme damage in Charles City and Elma, where a total of 256 businesses and 1,250 homes were either damaged beyond repair or destroyed. Eight churches, three schools were damaged or destroyed, the police station located in north-central Charles City was heavily damaged, and 1,250 vehicles were destroyed. About 60 percent of the city was damaged by the tornado. Cars were thrown, trees were uprooted, and homes were completely swept away at F5 intensity. The damage costs totaled an estimated $30 million, most of which was centered in Charles City but also spread out across its entire path.

=== Casualties ===
The tornado killed 13 people and injured 462 others. All 13 deaths from the tornado occurred in Charles City. Of those injured, 76 people required hospitalization. An estimated 200-300 people were treated at hospitals in the surrounding area. A total of 12 people were injured in Elma, while all other injuries occurred in Ardeale and Charles City.

== See also ==
- 1968 Oelwein tornado, another related F5 tornado that occurred on the same day.

== Bibliography ==
- "May 15 1968 Iowa Tornado Summary". National Weather Service. LaCrosse, Wisconsin. July 8, 2024.
- "Charles City - The May 15, 1968 Tornado Outbreak". National Weather Service. LaCrosse, Wisconsin. July 8, 2024.
