= 1968 Oelwein–Maynard tornado =

Catastrophic F5 tornado in 1968

- Clockwise from top: A photograph of the uncondensed, multi-vortex tornado approaching Oelwein; A swept home in Maynard, where two fatalities occurred; A view of downtown Oelwein, following the tornado

Meteorological history
- Formed: May 15, 1968; 4:57 p.m. CDT (UTC–05:00)
- Dissipated: May 15, 1968; 5:40 p.m. CDT (UTC–05:00)
- Duration: 43 minutes

F5 tornado
- on the Fujita scale
- Max width: 500 yd (460 m)
- Path length: 13.1 mi (21.1 km)
- Highest winds: >261 mph (420 km/h)

Overall effects
- Fatalities: 5
- Injuries: 156
- Areas affected: Fayette County, Iowa; particularly Oelwein, Maynard, and Fayette
- Part of the Tornado outbreak of May 15–16, 1968 and Tornadoes of 1968

During the late afternoon and early evening of May 15, 1968, a fatal and devastating F5 tornado struck the cities of Oelwein and Maynard in Fayette County, Iowa, killing 5 and injuring at least 156. This tornado caused approximately $21 million (1968 USD) in damages along a 13.1 mi (21.1 km) path, and was one of two F5 tornadoes that touched down as part of a significant, two-day tornado outbreak that impacted the Mississippi Valley on May 15–16, 1968.

== Tornado summary ==
At approximately 4:57 PM, the tornado was first reported 1 mile southwest of Oelwein. The warning sirens sounded for only 15 seconds before power failed. After touching down, the tornado began to move in a linear line, tracking northeastward. Shortly after touching down, it entered the business area of Oelwein, hitting North Frederick Street and South Frederick Street. It also tracked through another block, located on Southeast First Avenue. 68 homes were destroyed here or in the surrounding area, and up to 132 homes were heavily damaged, while ~600 homes sustained relatively minor damage. Every business-owned building in downtown Oelwein sustained varying degrees of damage, and 51 were completely destroyed. Two churches, an elementary school, and the middle school were destroyed.

At around this point in the tornado's lifetime, multiple people reported seeing more than one tornado on the ground, although this has never been confirmed. The tornado then began to curve north, tracking through the western part of Maynard. ~25 houses were destroyed, and around 5 square blocks were destroyed at a high intensity, including a $120,000 (1968 USD) Lutheran church.

Many sparsely-distanced farms within a mile radius of the tornado path north of Maynard were either destroyed or heavily damaged, and many others received minor damage. The tornado curved upward at around this point, tracking due-north before lifting after ~5 miles.

== Aftermath ==
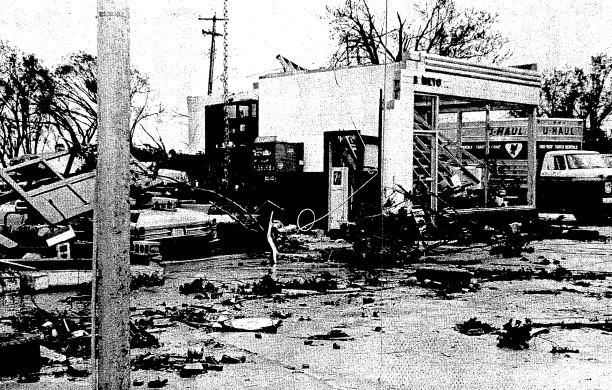
F3+ Damage in Oelwein

The farm homes of Raymond Lundry and Peter Greco, which were located around 1/4 of a mile away from each other, were completely destroyed. Lundry lost 76 pigs, and six cattle. Greco lost seven heads of livestock plus rabbits and chickens.

This tornado affected 965 families and caused 5 fatalities. Of the 156 injuries, 34 were hospitalized. Loss estimates ranged upward to 21 million dollars, most of which occurred in Oelwein.

== See also ==
- 1968 Hansell-Charles City tornado, a related F5 tornado that would occur the same day
- List of F5, EF5, and IF5 tornadoes
- List of schools struck by tornadoes

== Sources ==
- May 15 1968 Iowa Tornado Summary (Service Assessment). LaCrosse, Wisconsin: National Oceanic and Atmospheric Administration.
