= Gustav Oelwein =

Gustav A. Oelwein (February 10, 1838 – December 19, 1913) was the founder of the city of Oelwein, Iowa in the United States.

Gustav A. Oelwein, after whose family the city of Oelwein was named, was a native of Baltimore, Maryland, and the only surviving child of Frederick and Cecelia (Schmidt) Oelwein, who had been natives of Saxony, Germany, and had emigrated to America in 1837, settling in Baltimore.

Mr. Oelwein was born on February 10, 1838, and in 1848 moved with his parents to Dubuque County, Iowa, and later, in 1855, the family moved to Jefferson township, Fayette County. He attended the schools of Baltimore and Dubuque, and after moving to Fayette County, he gave his attention to agricultural pursuits, which business he followed for many years. In 1857 the land on which the city of Oelwein now stands was purchased, and in 1868 he purchased a tract of land about two miles south of the present city and erected a flour and feed mill, which he operated for some time.

In 1872 the Burlington, Cedar Rapids and Northern Railroad survey came through, and the town was started in 1873. Mr. Oelwein donating the site, the town was given his name.

On February 23, 1861, Mr. Oelwein led to the marriage altar Emma Schmidt, daughter of Frederick and Maria Schmidt, who was born in Saxony, Germany, on March 24, 1836. She attended the schools in her native country and in 1855 came with her parents to America, where they located on a farm in Jefferson township, Fayette County.

By their union eight children have been born, as follows: Mary E., Carl F. W., Emma A., Oscar R. (who died in infancy), Anna L., Lena C., Gustav A. Jr., and Theresa C. All the children received good educational advantages.
