= Oelwein, Iowa =

- City
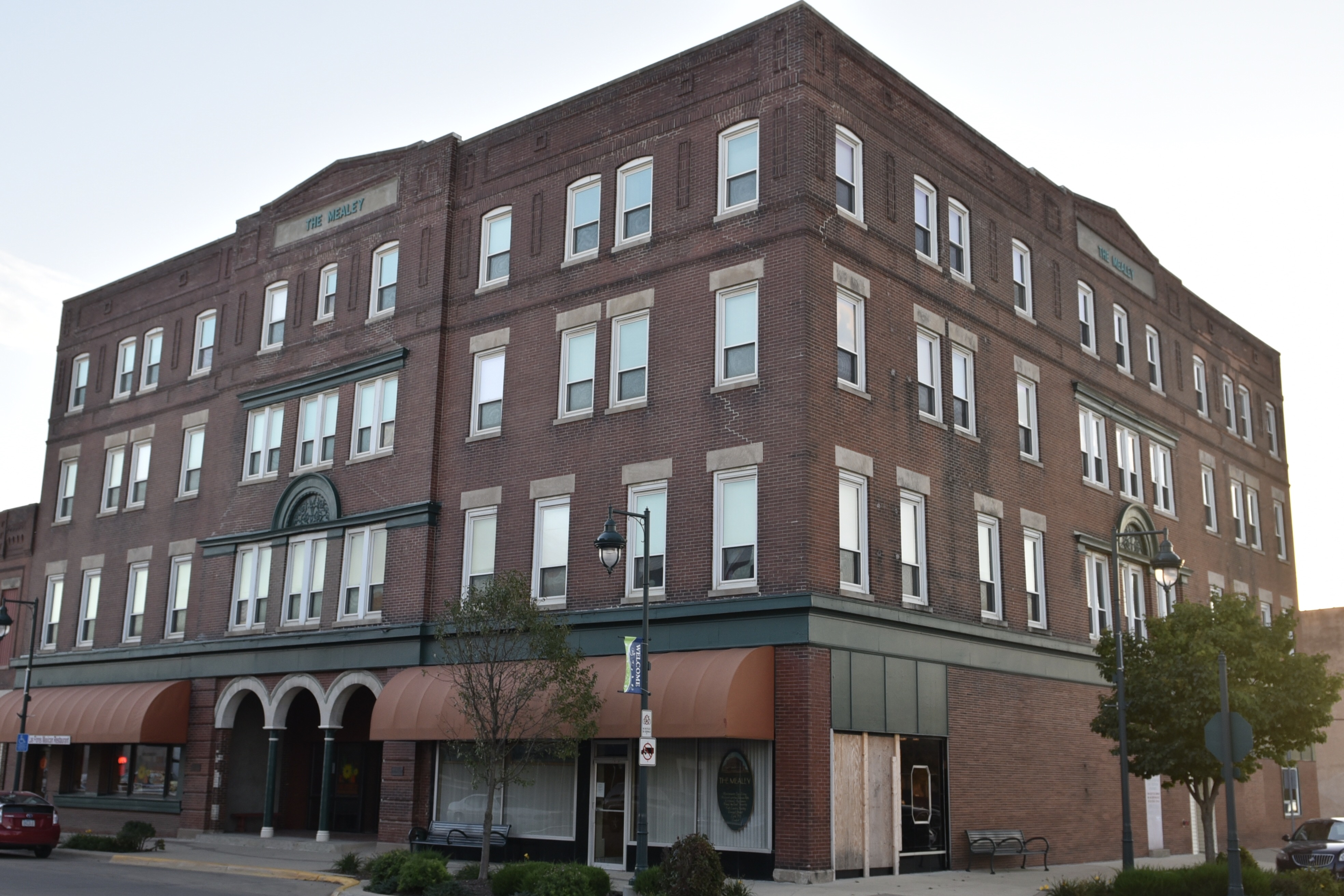
- The Hotel Mealey in downtown Oelwein
- Nickname: Hub City
- Motto: Hub of Northeast Iowa
- Location of Oelwein, Iowa
- Coordinates: 42°40′17″N 91°54′47″W
- Country: United States
- State: Iowa
- County: Fayette

Government
  - Type: Mayor–Council
  - Mayor: As of 2020 Brett Devore

Area
  - Total: 4.85 sq mi (12.55 km^{2})
  - Land: 4.81 sq mi (12.47 km^{2})
  - Water: 0.031 sq mi (0.08 km^{2})
- Elevation: 1,037 ft (316 m)

Population (2020)
  - Total: 5,920
  - Density: 1,229.8/sq mi (474.81/km^{2})
- Time zone: UTC-6 (Central (CST))
  - Summer (DST): UTC-5 (CDT)
- ZIP code: 50662
- Area code: 319
- FIPS code: 19-58620
- GNIS feature ID: 2395301
- Website: http://www.cityofoelwein.org/main

Oelwein is a city in Fayette County, Iowa, United States. The population was 5,920 at the time of the 2020 census, a decrease of 11.5% from the 2000 census. The largest community in Fayette County, it is located at the junction of State Highways 3 and 150.

== History ==
The town of Oelwein was laid out in a corn field purchased from pioneer settler Gustav Oelwein on the coming of the Burlington, Cedar Rapids and Minnesota Railroad (later called the Rock Island) in 1872. Some years later the two dividing streets of Oelwein were named after his sons, Frederick and Charles.

Oelwein's present site was entered in 1852 by J. B. Burch. The hamlet of Oelwein was instituted in 1873, and was incorporated as a town in 1888, with Dr. Israel Pattison becoming its first mayor. The town suffered its chief setback in 1887, when nearly all of the old Main Street business district (now First Avenue SE) was destroyed by fire. In 1890 the census gave the population as 830.

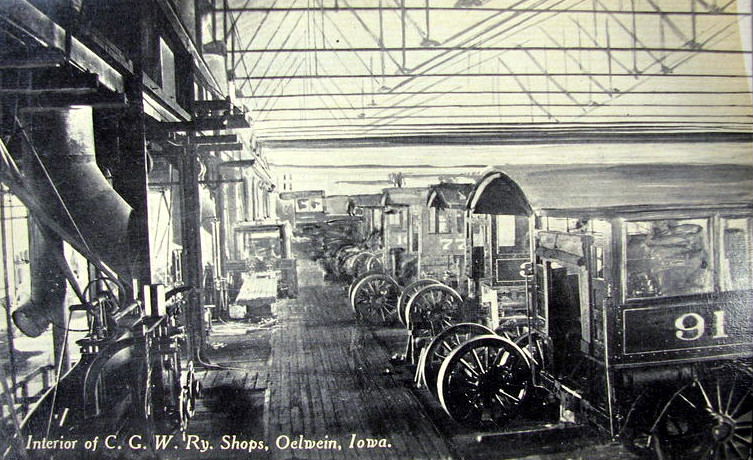
CGW locomotive shop in the early 1900s

By January 1892, Oelwein was chosen to become the center of the Chicago Great Western Railway; the CGW made the town the site of their locomotive and car repair shop, where four lines converge. Clearing the land for the shops began in June 1894. The shops were completed and put into operation in May 1899. Thus, Oelwein became known as the "Shop City" and later the "Hub City" because of the rail lines coming into town and the repair shops located here.

By 1895, the population had increased to 1,928, and in 1897 Oelwein was incorporated as a city. In 1900, Oelwein had 5,142 people within the city limits, of whom 789 were foreign-born. Oelwein was one of few Iowa towns to experience an influx of Italian immigrants who were employed in the railroad industry. In 1910, the population was 6,028, and in 1940, 7,801.

In 1968, the town suffered another setback when a large tornado swept through the main business district. 68 homes were destroyed, including some in F5 damage, 132 sustained major damage and 600 sustained less damage. Every business in the district suffered damage including 51 that were destroyed. Two churches, an elementary school, and the middle school were destroyed. Extensive damage was also done in nearby Maynard. Along the path, 5 people died (one in Oelwein), 156 were injured, and $21 million ($18 million in Oelwein) worth of damage was done, adjusted for inflation to $130.4 million today.

Oelwein remained a "railroad town" until the early 1980s when most of the railroad tracks to the East, North and then West directions were abandoned. Transco Railway Products exists in Oelwein today. That business employs about 190 people repairing railroad cars. Transco employees donated their time to refurbish a Chicago Great Western EMD FP7 diesel locomotive that is displayed near the Hub City Heritage Museum, 26 2nd Avenue SW, the museum of railroad memorabilia.

=== Methland controversy ===
The 2009 book Methland: The Death and Life of an American Small Town by Nick Reding (Bloomsbury Press) documents the drug culture and how it ties into larger issues of rural flight and small town economic decline placed in the historic context of the drug trade. While Reding's book received positive reviews from the New York Times Sunday Book Review and Washington Post's Book World, it was severely criticised by Cedar Rapids columnist Laura Behrens, who wrote, "it is so ridden with errors of basic reporting that the credibility of its larger premises is crippled," pointing out several factual errors.

== Geography ==
According to the United States Census Bureau, the city has a total area of 4.86 square miles (12.59 km^{2}), of which 4.81 square miles (12.46 km^{2}) is land and 0.05 square miles (0.13 km^{2}) is water.

== Demographics ==
Historical population
Census	Pop.	Note	%±
1880	397		—
1890	830		109.1%
1900	5,142		519.5%
1910	6,028		17.2%
1920	7,455		23.7%
1930	7,794		4.5%
1940	7,801		0.1%
1950	7,858		0.7%
1960	8,282		5.4%
1970	7,735		−6.6%
1980	7,564		−2.2%
1990	6,493		−14.2%
2000	6,692		3.1%
2010	6,415		−4.1%
2020	5,920		−7.7%
U.S. Decennial Census

=== 2020 census ===
As of the 2020 census, Oelwein had a population of 5,920, with 2,550 households and 1,445 families. The population density was 1,229.7 inhabitants per square mile (474.8/km^{2}). There were 2,936 housing units at an average density of 609.9 per square mile (235.5/km^{2}).

The median age was 43.1 years. 23.2% of residents were under the age of 18 and 23.1% were 65 years of age or older. For every 100 females there were 96.2 males, and for every 100 females age 18 and over there were 90.6 males age 18 and over.

Of households, 25.4% had children under the age of 18 living in them. Of all households, 39.3% were married-couple households, 20.5% were households with a male householder and no spouse or partner present, and 30.4% were households with a female householder and no spouse or partner present. 43.3% of all households were non-families; 36.8% were made up of individuals, and 19.1% had someone living alone who was 65 years of age or older.

98.7% of residents lived in urban areas, while 1.3% lived in rural areas.

Of housing units, 13.1% were vacant. The homeowner vacancy rate was 5.8% and the rental vacancy rate was 14.8%.

Racial composition as of the 2020 census
Race	Number	Percent
White	5,372	90.7%
Black or African American	84	1.4%
American Indian and Alaska Native	15	0.3%
Asian	24	0.4%
Native Hawaiian and Other Pacific Islander	1	0.0%
Some other race	29	0.5%
Two or more races	395	6.7%
Hispanic or Latino (of any race)	254	4.3%

=== 2010 census ===
At the 2010 census there were 6,415 people in 2,763 households, including 1,678 families, in the city. The population density was 1,333.7 inhabitants per square mile (514.9/km^{2}). There were 3,058 housing units at an average density of 635.8 per square mile (245.5/km^{2}). The racial makup of the city was 96.1% White, 0.9% African American, 0.1% Native American, 0.6% Asian, 0.1% Pacific Islander, 0.6% from other races, and 1.6% from two or more races. Hispanic or Latino of any race were 2.9%.

Of the 2,763 households 27.5% had children under the age of 18 living with them, 44.3% were married couples living together, 11.5% had a female householder with no husband present, 5.0% had a male householder with no wife present, and 39.3% were non-families. 33.9% of households were one person and 17.1% were one person aged 65 or older. The average household size was 2.26 and the average family size was 2.85.

The median age was 42.9 years. 23.1% of residents were under the age of 18; 7.6% were between the ages of 18 and 24; 21.9% were from 25 to 44; 26.3% were from 45 to 64; and 21.2% were 65 or older. The gender makeup of the city was 47.6% male and 52.4% female.

=== 2000 census ===
At the 2000 census there were 6,692 people in 2,808 households, including 1,819 families, in the city. The population density was 1,395.8 inhabitants per square mile (538.9/km^{2}). There were 3,040 housing units at an average density of 634.1 per square mile (244.8/km^{2}). The racial makup of the city was 97.19% White, 0.42% African American, 0.19% Native American, 0.40% Asian, 0.06% Pacific Islander, 0.64% from other races, and 1.09% from two or more races. Hispanic or Latino of any race were 2.29%.

Of the 2,808 households 28.8% had children under the age of 18 living with them, 50.0% were married couples living together, 10.9% had a female householder with no husband present, and 35.2% were non-families. 31.1% of households were one person and 17.5% were one person aged 65 or older. The average household size was 2.31 and the average family size was 2.87.

Age spread: 24.4% under the age of 18, 7.4% from 18 to 24, 24.3% from 25 to 44, 21.2% from 45 to 64, and 22.7% 65 or older. The median age was 41 years. For every 100 females, there were 86.8 males. For every 100 females age 18 and over, there were 82.8 males.

The median household income was $27,347 and the median family income was $32,279. Males had a median income of $28,075 versus $19,479 for females. The per capita income for the city was $17,502. About 11.7% of families and 13.7% of the population were below the poverty line, including 19.4% of those under age 18 and 13.7% of those age 65 or over.

== Arts and culture ==
The Williams Center for the Performing Arts is a modern auditorium with seating for 800. Performers include frequent visits from regional and national performers as well as local talent.

== Parks and recreation ==
Recreational opportunities include public parks, campgrounds, children's playgrounds, and picnic areas. Canoeing, boating and swimming are available at City Park. A paved hiking/biking trail is being extended to connect all parks in town. Tennis courts, a skateboard rink, and softball diamonds are at Wings Park. One 9-hole golf course is available. A new ball field includes lighted fields for school games and will soon include soccer fields. In the winter, enjoy cross-country skiing, snowmobiling, and ice fishing.

Walter P. Chrysler Park

Size: 2 acres (8,100 m^{2}). Located at North Frederick and 2nd Street, originally two small parks referred to as "Twin Parks" or "Gazebo Park". Dedicated to Walter P. Chrysler, who once resided in Oelwein, the part to the east offers a gazebo with picnic facilities, water fountain, flower gardens, and a planting of Thunderchild Flowering Crabapple Trees, received through an Arbor Day Challenge Grant and Oelwein Trees Forever. The second part holds the Korean and Vietnam Veterans Memorials, donated by the Robert McNamara family in 1998.

Orville Christophel Park

Size: 1-acre (4,000 m^{2}). Located at 1st Avenue and 1st Street SW, this park is known as Orville Christophel Memorial or Log Cabin Park. Most people believe it was Gustav Oelwein who built the cabin in the Orville Christophel Park, but he was not involved with the cabin. J.B Burch built the cabin in 1852 which still stands at the park today. The park offers a historical monument from days of yore, picnic tables, benches, and parking for downtown shopping.

City Park

Size: 69 acres (280,000 m^{2}). Located on South Frederick, this park is frontage property to a 55-acre (220,000 m^{2}) artificial lake named Lake Oelwein. Modern playground equipment was installed with the help of the Kids Playground Fund.

The park offers picnic shelters with tables, open play area, tennis court, sand volleyball, horseshoe courts, restroom facilities, a dog park, modern and primitive camping, and a dump station. The lake offers "no wake" boating.

The campground overlooks Lake Oelwein and provides public boating access. Facilities include 30 modern RV sites, primitive campsites, private shower facilities, and dump station.

Levin Park

Size: 2 acres (8,100 m^{2}). Located at 4th Avenue and 4½ Street SW, this park offers picnic tables, an open play field, and is bordered by a natural wooded environment. A bike/skateboard/walking trail accesses it on the west.

Platt's Park

Size: 16 acres (65,000 m^{2}). Located at 7th Street and 7th Avenue SE, this park offers 1.25 miles (2.01 km) of footpaths, picnic shelters and tables, playground equipment, horseshoe court, restrooms, and a large playfield. This park is the home of a Gazebo and "Trail of Dreams" created by Oelwein Care Center. New playground equipment was installed with the help of the Kids Playground Fund.

Redgate Park

Size: 24 acres (97,000 m^{2}). Located on West Charles Street, this park offers a large wooded area, as well as picnic facilities, playground equipment, tennis court, horseshoe courts, restrooms and Bocce Ball courts. This park has new playground equipment installed by the Kids Playground Fund.

Reidy Park

Size: 3 acres (12,000 m^{2}). Located at 2nd Street and Hillside Drive SE, this park offers a basketball court, playground equipment, picnic facilities, new and improved tennis courts, and new playground equipment installed by the Kids Playground Fund.

Wings Park

Size: 24 acres (97,000 m^{2}). Located at 4th Street and 5th Avenue NE, Wings Park is the home of the Oelwein Family Aquatics Center. The park offers picnic shelters and tables, tennis courts, 3 softball fields, basketball court, horseshoe courts, restrooms, and playground equipment installed with the help of the Kids Playground Fund.

Great Western Park

The Great Western Park is the newest park in the town, on the northwest side. It functions as a wildlife preserve.

== Education ==
The Oelwein Community School District operates public schools in the city. Children from Oelwein, Hazleton, and Stanley attend school there. The schools are listed as follows:

- Little Husky Learning Center – Kindergarten, preschool, and Head Start
- Wings Park Elementary – 1st–4th Grade
- Oelwein Middle School – 5th–8th Grade
- Oelwein High School – 9th–12th Grade

Sacred Heart School of the Roman Catholic Archdiocese of Dubuque was formerly located in Oelwein. The school was established in 1904 in its own building. By 2019, it sustained a decline in income and in the number of students and established a GoFundMe to stave off closure. Due to this decline in enrollment, the school closed in 2020.

In addition, Oelwein is also home to the Regional Academy for Math and Science (RAMS). RAMS is an educational facility that strengthens area high schools and serves college and adult learners through courses offered by Northeast Iowa Community College (NICC). RAMS provides a curriculum for high school and college students and serves as a summer regional center for gifted and talented programs. RAMS also partners with the regent universities to offer summer coursework for teachers.

== Notable people ==
- Maurice E. Baringer (1921–2011), Iowa State Treasurer and state representative
- Walter Chrysler (1875–1940), founder of the Chrysler Corporation
- Walter P. Chrysler Jr. (1909–1988), art collector and museum benefactor, president of Chrysler Building
- Arthur T. Gibbons (1903–1986), Businessman and Minnesota state representative
- Ray Hanken (1911–1980), football player
- John Francis Kinney (1937–2019), former bishop of Bismarck and St. Cloud
- Gustav Oelwein (1838–1913), town founder
- Kermit Tyler (1913–2010), US Air Force pilot during the attack on Pearl Harbor
- Dick Wagner (1942–2014), American rock music guitarist, songwriter and author

== Other points of interest ==
Oelwein Sports Complex

Size: 32 acres (130,000 m^{2}). Located on 20th Street SE, this park offers two soccer fields, two softball/baseball fields, and the home baseball field of the Oelwein Huskies. The complex is restricted in use, for league play only at this time. Modern restrooms, concessions stand, and drinking fountains are available.

Oelwein Family Aquatics Center

Located at 411 4th Street NE, this facility offers a zero-depth entry pool, 150-foot (46 m) water slide, 6 racing lanes, 1 and 3 meter diving boards, sunning deck & grass areas, modern changing facilities, playground facility, and concessions facility, near wings park (not the school).

Williams Wellness Center

The Wellness Center is open 7 days a week. It features a variety of fitness and dance classes, circuit weight and cardiovascular equipment, a gymnasium and indoor track. Offerings also include Personal Training and Massage Therapy.
