= 1968 Tracy tornado =

1968 F5 tornado in Minnesota

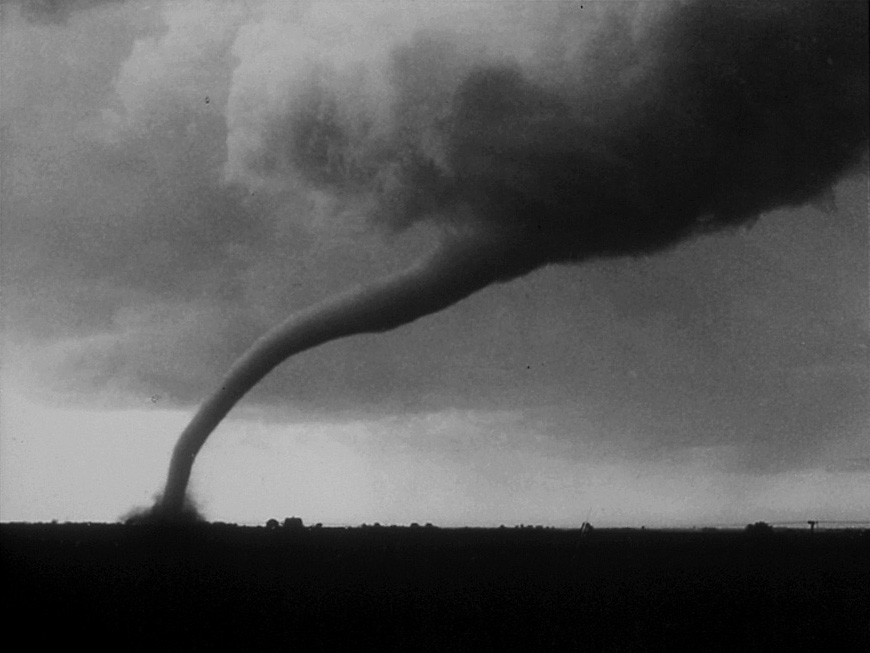
- Eric Lantz took his award-winning photo of the Tracy tornado as it was leaving the town

Meteorological history
- Formed: 7:04 p.m. June 13, 1968

F5 tornado
- on the Fujita scale

Overall effects
- Fatalities: 9
- Injuries: 125
- Damage: $68.5 million (2025 USD)
- Areas affected: Southwest Minnesota
- Part of the Tornadoes of 1968

The 1968 Tracy tornado was a narrow but extremely powerful tornado that struck Tracy, Minnesota on Thursday, June 13, 1968, at around 7:00 p.m. Rated F5 on the Fujita scale, the tornado killed nine people and injured 125 others. The tornado tracked nine miles (14 km) through Murray, Lyon and Redwood counties in southwestern Minnesota. It is one of only two official F5 tornadoes that have occurred in Minnesota, although several other tornadoes that occurred before 1950 are estimated to have been F5 strength.

The tornado destroyed 111 homes, caused major damage to 76 homes, and caused minor damage to an additional 114. Five businesses were destroyed, and 15 others were damaged. Some homes in town only had their foundations left behind. A few farms outside of town were swept completely away, and extensive ground scouring occurred. An elementary school and 106 automobiles were destroyed, and a heavy boxcar was thrown more than a block by the storm. Two other boxcars were thrown 300 yards (270 m), and a steel I-beam was carried for two miles (3.2 km) on a piece of roof. Hard rains and hail were also reported. A total of five tornadoes hit Minnesota on June 13, 1968, most of which were rated F0.

== See also ==
- Climate of Minnesota
- List of North American tornadoes and tornado outbreaks
- Tornado outbreak of June 14–18, 1992, which included the 1992 Chandler-Lake Wilson tornado, to date the last E/F5 tornado to have officially occurred in Minnesota.
- List of F5 and EF5 tornadoes
