= Elma, Iowa =

- City
- Location of Elma, Iowa
- Coordinates: 43°14′55″N 92°26′19″W
- Country: United States
- State: Iowa
- County: Howard
- Incorporated: July 11, 1891

Area
  - Total: 1.23 sq mi (3.18 km^{2})
  - Land: 1.23 sq mi (3.18 km^{2})
  - Water: 0 sq mi (0.00 km^{2})
- Elevation: 1,178 ft (359 m)

Population (2020)
  - Total: 505
  - Density: 412/sq mi (158.9/km^{2})
- Time zone: UTC-6 (Central (CST))
  - Summer (DST): UTC-5 (CDT)
- ZIP code: 50628
- Area code: 641
- FIPS code: 19-25095
- GNIS feature ID: 2394669
- Website: www.elmaia.com

Elma is a city in Howard County, Iowa, United States. The population was 505 at the time of the 2020 census.

== History ==
Elma had its start in the late 1880s by the building of the railroad through that territory. The Elma post office opened in 1886.

== Geography ==
According to the United States Census Bureau, the city has a total area of 1.29 square miles (3.34 km^{2}), all of it land.

== Demographics ==
Historical populations
Year	Pop.	±%
1900	976	—
1910	807	−17.3%
1920	874	+8.3%
1930	771	−11.8%
1940	790	+2.5%
1950	731	−7.5%
1960	706	−3.4%
1970	601	−14.9%
1980	714	+18.8%
1990	653	−8.5%
2000	598	−8.4%
2010	546	−8.7%
2020	505	−7.5%
Source:"U.S. Census website". United States Census Bureau. and Iowa Data Center; Source: U.S. Decennial Census

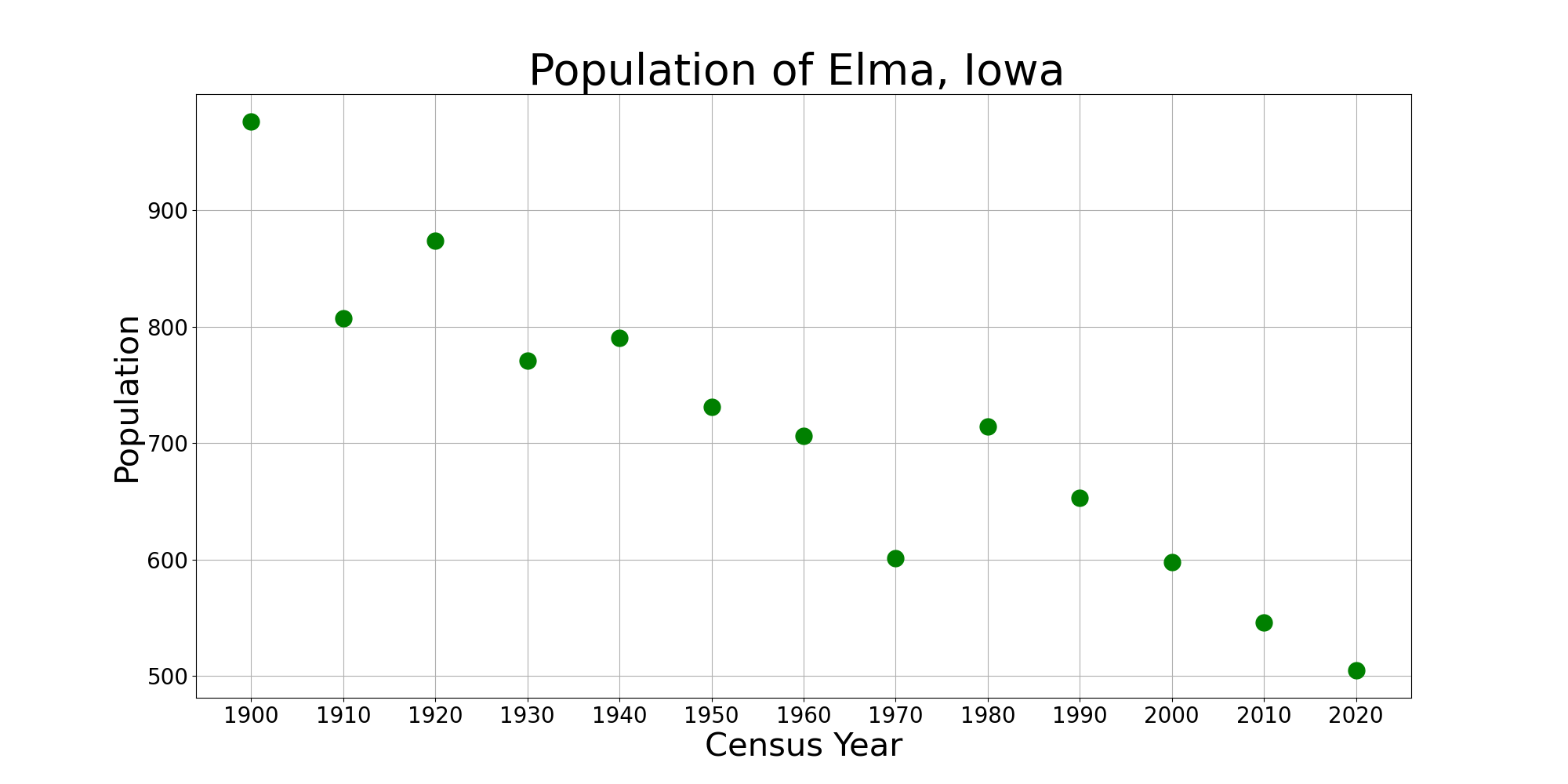
The population of Elma, Iowa from US census data

=== 2020 census ===
As of the census of 2020, there were 505 people, 238 households, and 137 families residing in the city. The population density was 411.6 inhabitants per square mile (158.9/km^{2}). There were 267 housing units at an average density of 217.6 per square mile (84.0/km^{2}). The racial makeup of the city was 96.0% White, 0.0% Black or African American, 0.0% Native American, 0.0% Asian, 0.2% Pacific Islander, 0.8% from other races and 3.0% from two or more races. Hispanic or Latino persons of any race comprised 2.2% of the population.

Of the 238 households, 23.9% of which had children under the age of 18 living with them, 41.6% were married couples living together, 7.6% were cohabitating couples, 25.2% had a female householder with no spouse or partner present and 25.6% had a male householder with no spouse or partner present. 42.4% of all households were non-families. 39.9% of all households were made up of individuals, 22.7% had someone living alone who was 65 years old or older.

The median age in the city was 57.2 years. 20.8% of the residents were under the age of 20; 3.2% were between the ages of 20 and 24; 16.0% were from 25 and 44; 24.4% were from 45 and 64; and 35.6% were 65 years of age or older. The gender makeup of the city was 48.9% male and 51.1% female.

=== 2010 census ===
As of the census of 2010, there were 546 people, 240 households, and 142 families residing in the city. The population density was 423.3 inhabitants per square mile (163.4/km^{2}). There were 272 housing units at an average density of 210.9 per square mile (81.4/km^{2}). The racial makeup of the city was 96.3% White, 1.3% African American, 0.2% Pacific Islander, and 2.2% from two or more races. Hispanic or Latino of any race were 1.5% of the population.

There were 240 households, of which 22.5% had children under the age of 18 living with them, 49.6% were married couples living together, 6.7% had a female householder with no husband present, 2.9% had a male householder with no wife present, and 40.8% were non-families. 34.6% of all households were made up of individuals, and 19.6% had someone living alone who was 65 years of age or older. The average household size was 2.11 and the average family size was 2.70.

The median age in the city was 51.3 years. 19.8% of residents were under the age of 18; 3.6% were between the ages of 18 and 24; 16.5% were from 25 to 44; 29.7% were from 45 to 64; and 30.4% were 65 years of age or older. The gender makeup of the city was 47.6% male and 52.4% female.

=== 2000 census ===
As of the census of 2000, there were 598 people, 242 households, and 150 families residing in the city. The population density was 464.5 inhabitants per square mile (179.3/km^{2}). There were 264 housing units at an average density of 205.1 per square mile (79.2/km^{2}). The racial makeup of the city was 99.33% White, 0.17% African American, 0.17% Native American, and 0.33% from two or more races.

There were 242 households, out of which 24.8% had children under the age of 18 living with them, 53.7% were married couples living together, 6.6% had a female householder with no husband present, and 38.0% were non-families. 34.7% of all households were made up of individuals, and 21.1% had someone living alone who was 65 years of age or older. The average household size was 2.23 and the average family size was 2.88.

20.6% were under the age of 18, 7.2% from 18 to 24, 21.4% from 25 to 44, 22.9% from 45 to 64, and 27.9% were 65 years of age or older. The median age was 46 years. For every 100 females, there were 88.6 males. For every 100 females age 18 and over, there were 89.2 males.

The median income for a household in the city was $27,417, and the median income for a family was $40,417. Males had a median income of $26,250 versus $19,167 for females. The per capita income for the city was $15,263. About 10.8% of families and 17.4% of the population were below the poverty line, including 20.3% of those under age 18 and 26.2% of those age 65 or over.

== Schools ==
Howard–Winneshiek Community School District operates public schools. The district was formed from the merger of the Cresco, Lime Springs/Chester, Elma, and Ridgeway school districts, opening on July 1, 1960.

In 2013 the district board voted to close Elma Elementary School.
