= National Register of Historic Places listings in Buchanan County, Iowa =

Location of Buchanan County in Iowa

This is a list of the National Register of Historic Places listings in Buchanan County, Iowa.

This is intended to be a complete list of the properties and districts on the National Register of Historic Places in Buchanan County, Iowa, United States. Latitude and longitude coordinates are provided for many National Register properties and districts; these locations may be seen together in a map.

There are 20 properties and districts listed on the National Register in the county.

This National Park Service list is complete through NPS recent listings posted March 21, 2025.

== Current listings ==
	Name on the Register	Image	Date listed	Location	City or town	Description
1	280th Street Bridge	280th Street Bridge	June 25, 1998 (#98000756)	280th St. over an unnamed stream 42°23′06″N 91°56′34″W	Independence	
2	Buchanan County Court House	Buchanan County Court House	August 28, 2003 (#03000820)	216 5th Ave. 42°28′14″N 91°53′21″W	Independence	PWA Moderne-style courthouse built in 1940.
3	Fisher-Plane Commercial Building	Fisher-Plane Commercial Building	March 8, 1997 (#97000212)	119 and 121 1st St., E. 42°28′07″N 91°53′35″W	Independence	
4	Mathias C. and Eva B. Crowell Fuhrman Farm	Mathias C. and Eva B. Crowell Fuhrman Farm	May 1, 1998 (#97000213)	1780 185th St. 42°30′47″N 91°55′44″W	Independence	
5	Captain Daniel S. and Fannie L. (Brooks) Lee House	Captain Daniel S. and Fannie L. (Brooks) Lee House	January 7, 2010 (#09001203)	803 1st St. East; 42°28′08″N 91°53′06″W	Independence	
6	Maas Commercial Building	Maas Commercial Building	August 14, 1998 (#98001047)	209 1st St., E. 42°28′01″N 91°53′35″W	Independence	
7	Malek Theatre	Malek Theatre	May 21, 2009 (#09000329)	116 2nd Ave. NE; 42°28′10″N 91°53′36″W	Independence	
8	Erza McKenzie Round Barn	Erza McKenzie Round Barn	June 30, 1986 (#86001419)	Off Iowa Highway 150; 42°36′26″N 91°56′07″W	Hazleton	
9	Munson Building	Munson Building	November 21, 1976 (#76000736)	210 2nd St., NE. 42°28′14″N 91°53′44″W	Independence	
10	Robert R. and Julia L. Plane House	Robert R. and Julia L. Plane House	August 27, 1999 (#99001030)	301 3rd Ave., SE. 42°27′58″N 91°53′31″W	Independence	
11	Pleasant Grove Presbyterian Church	Pleasant Grove Presbyterian Church	October 4, 2017 (#100001697)	601 State St. 42°32′01″N 92°01′23″W	Chatham	
12	Eliphalet W. and Catherine E. Jaquish Purdy House	Eliphalet W. and Catherine E. Jaquish Purdy House	March 7, 1996 (#96000237)	215 3rd Ave., SW. 42°28′01″N 91°53′48″W	Independence	
13	Richardson-Jakway House	Richardson-Jakway House	June 27, 1985 (#85001382)	Rural Route #1; 42°35′04″N 91°43′26″W	Aurora	
14	Dr. Judd C. and Margaret S. Clarke Shellito House	Dr. Judd C. and Margaret S. Clarke Shellito House	January 16, 1997 (#96001588)	310 5th Ave., SE. 42°27′58″N 91°53′20″W	Independence	
15	State Savings Bank	State Savings Bank	August 27, 1999 (#99001031)	103 N. Water St. 42°23′40″N 91°45′41″W	Quasqueton	
16	Taylor's Ford Bridge	Taylor's Ford Bridge	June 25, 1998 (#98000755)	Nolen Ave. over the Wapsipinicon River; 42°23′58″N 91°48′46″W	Independence	
17	Lowell E. Walter House	Lowell E. Walter House	March 2, 1983 (#83000345)	Off Quasqueton Diagonal Boulevard northwest of Quasqueton; 42°24′31″N 91°46′11″W	Quasqueton	Preserved within Cedar Rock State Park.
18	Wapsipinicon Mill	Wapsipinicon Mill	April 21, 1975 (#75000678)	100 1st St., W. 42°28′08″N 91°53′53″W	Independence	
19	Wapsipinicon River Bridge	Wapsipinicon River Bridge	June 25, 1998 (#98000758)	Iowa Highway 150 over the Wapsipinicon River; 42°27′31″N 91°53′27″W	Independence	
20	Weins Commercial Building	Weins Commercial Building	January 16, 1997 (#96001585)	129-131 2nd Ave., NE. 42°28′11″N 91°53′37″W	Independence	

== Formerly listed ==
	Name on the Register	Image	Date listed	Date removed	Location	City or town	Description
1	Otter Creek Bridge		June 25, 1998 (#98000757)	June 22, 2004	105th St. over Otter Cr.	Hazleton vicinity	Pratt pony truss bridge built in 1870.
2	Otterville Bridge		June 25, 1998 (#98000759)	January 14, 2002	Bordner Dam Rd. over Wapsipinicon River	Independence vicinity	Relocated in 2000 after being damaged by floods in 1999.

== See also ==
- List of National Historic Landmarks in Iowa
- National Register of Historic Places listings in Iowa
- Listings in neighboring counties: Benton, Black Hawk, Bremer, Clayton, Delaware, Fayette, Linn
