= Taylor's Ford Bridge =

- U.S. National Register of Historic Places
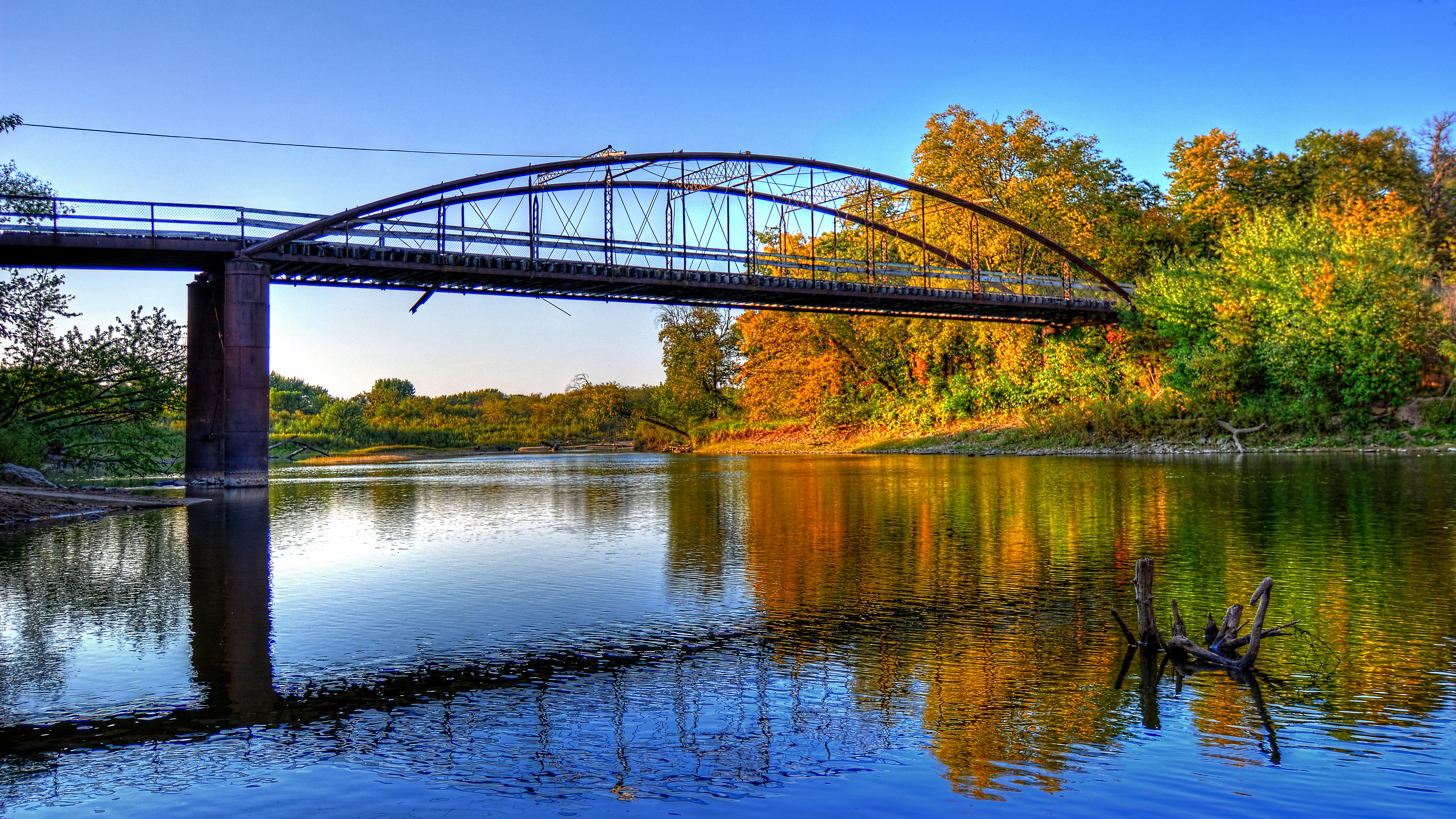

- Location within Iowa Location within the United States
- Location: Nolen Ave. over the Wapsipinicon River
- Nearest city: Independence, Iowa
- Coordinates: 42°23′58″N 91°48′46″W
- Built: 1872
- Architect: Wrought Iron Bridge Co.
- Architectural style: Truss arch bridge
- MPS: Highway Bridges of Iowa MPS
- NRHP reference No.: 98000755
- Added to NRHP: June 25, 1998

The Taylor's Ford Bridge is a historic structure located four miles southeast of Independence, Iowa, United States. It spans the Wapsipinicon River for 271 feet (83 m). In January 1872 the Buchanan County Board of Supervisors contracted with the Wrought Iron Bridge Co. from Canton, Ohio, to build a two-span bridge in the city of Independence for $20,102. It had replaced an earlier span that had been washed away in a flood. Both spans were replaced by a heavier span in 1891. One of the spans was moved to Buffalo Township, and has subsequently been removed. This bridge is the other span. It has been replaced a second time by a heavier bridge, but it remains in place even though it no longer carries vehicle traffic. The bridge was listed on the National Register of Historic Places in 1998.
