= Weins Commercial Building =

- U.S. National Register of Historic Places
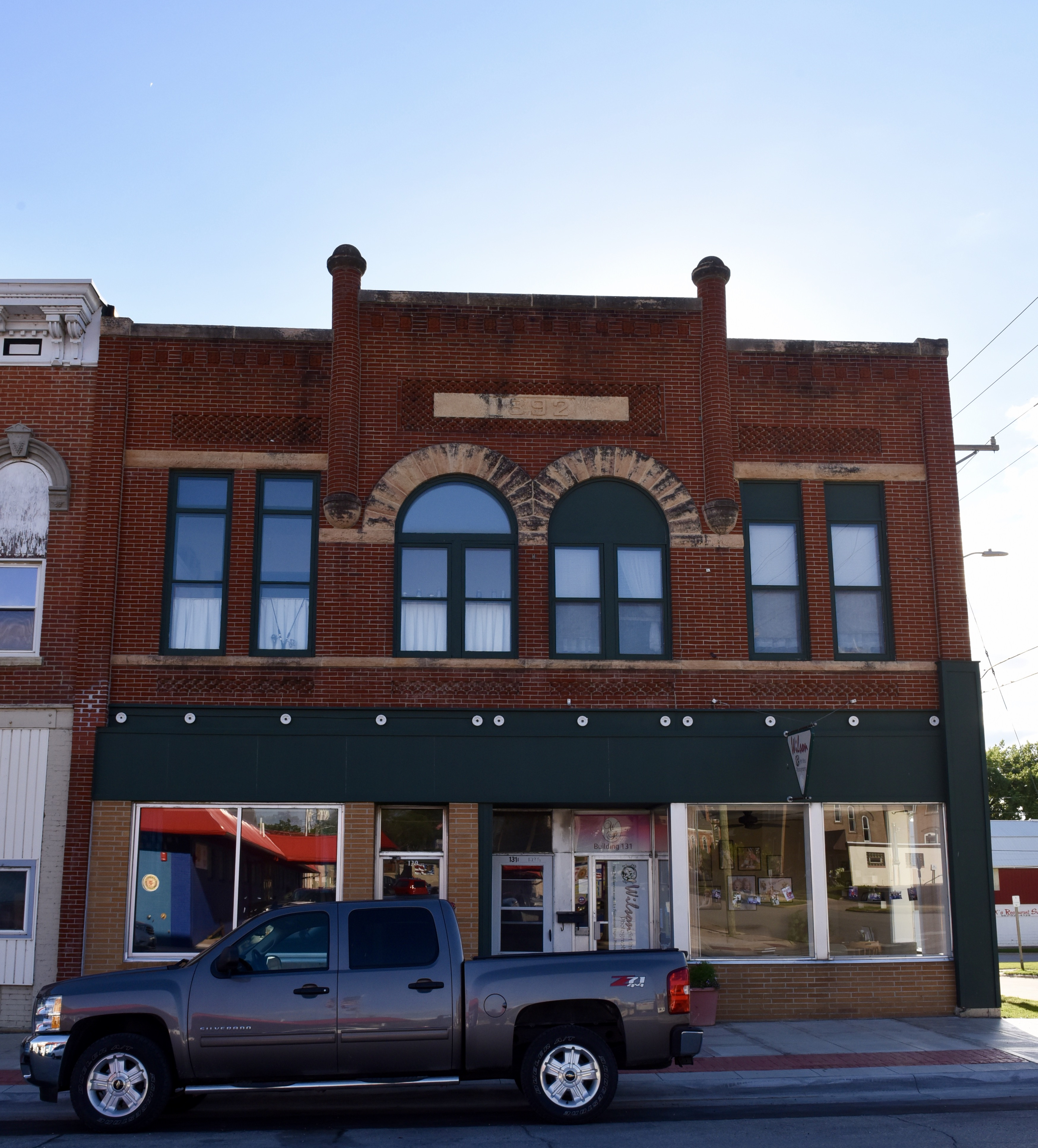

- Location within Iowa Location within the United States
- Location: 129-131 2nd Ave., NE. Independence, Iowa
- Coordinates: 42°28′11″N 91°53′37″W
- Built: 1892
- Architectural style: Romanesque Revival
- NRHP reference No.: 96001585
- Added to NRHP: January 16, 1997

The Weins Commercial Building is a historic building located in Independence, Iowa, United States. The central business district developed in Independence on the east side of the Wapsipinicon River along First Avenue. Fires in 1873 and 1874 destroyed the wooden buildings that were originally built there. They were replaced by brick and stone buildings, and the wooden sheds that accompanied the commercial buildings were eliminated. This two-story brick Romanesque Revival style building was part of a second wave of new commercial construction in Independence, this time away from First Avenue. Built in 1892, it features patterned brick work ornamentation, round-arch windows, and rusticated limestone and brick courses that emphasize the divisions of the interior. Most of the commercial buildings in Independence were built in the Italianate style, so the use of the Romanesque Revival for this building makes it unique. It was listed on the National Register of Historic Places in 1997.
