= Fisher–Plane Commercial Building =

- U.S. National Register of Historic Places
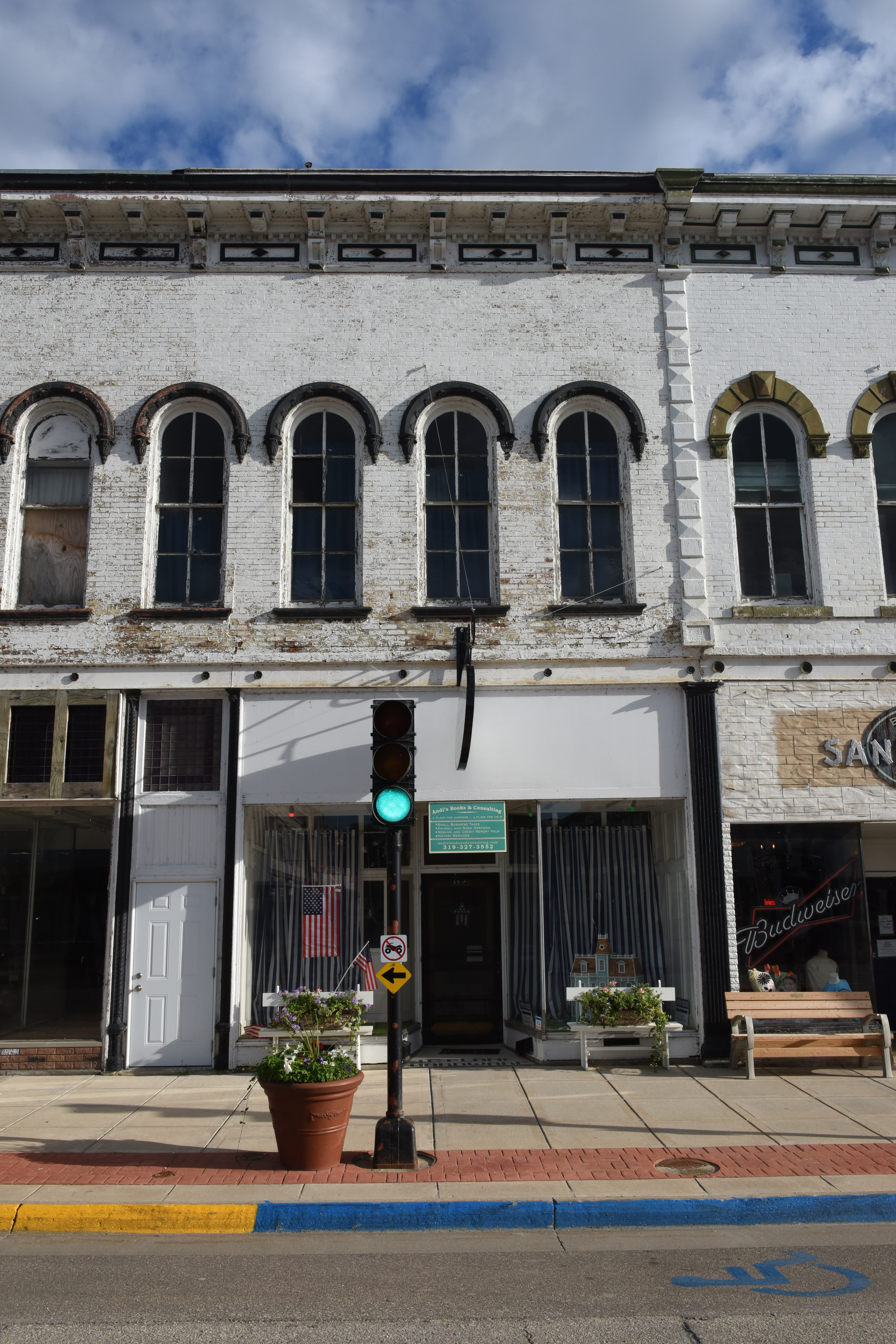

- Location within Iowa Location within the United States
- Location: 119 and 121 1st St., E. Independence, Iowa
- Coordinates: 42°28′07″N 91°53′35″W
- Built: 1874
- Built by: George Netcott, Jr.
- Architectural style: Italianate
- NRHP reference No.: 97000212
- Added to NRHP: March 8, 1997

The Fishe–Plane Commercial Building is a historic building located in Independence, Iowa, United States. The central business district developed in Independence on the east side of the Wapsipinicon River. Fires in 1873 and 1874 destroyed the wooden buildings that were originally built there. They were replaced by brick and stone buildings, and the wooden sheds that accompanied the commercial buildings were eliminated. This two-story brick Italianate style building was one of the new buildings constructed in 1874. Its construction was attributed to George Netcott Jr., an English native who owned the George Netcott Brick Yards. He is credited with building many of the brick buildings in the city. It features evenly spaced arched windows with cast metal hoods, and a prominent metal cornice. The building was listed on the National Register of Historic Places in 1997.
