= Otterville =

Otterville is the name of several places in the United States:

- Otterville, Illinois
- Otterville, Iowa
- Otterville, Missouri

Otterville is also a place in Canada:

- Otterville, Ontario
