= Pleasant Grove Presbyterian Church =

Pleasant Grove Presbyterian Church may refer to:

- Pleasant Grove Presbyterian Church (Chatham, Iowa), listed on the National Register of Historic Places
- Pleasant Grove Presbyterian Church (Salem, Oregon)
