= Washington Township, Buchanan County, Iowa =

Township in Iowa, US

Washington Township, Buchanan County
- Township
- Coordinates: 42°30′50″N 091°54′33″W
- Country: United States
- State: Iowa
- County: Buchanan

Area
  - Total: 36.40 sq mi (94.28 km^{2})
  - Land: 35.65 sq mi (92.34 km^{2})
  - Water: 0.75 sq mi (1.94 km^{2})
- Elevation: 958 ft (292 m)

Population (2000)
  - Total: 4,540
  - Density: 127/sq mi (49.2/km^{2})
- FIPS code: 19-94458
- GNIS feature ID: 0468904

Washington Township is one of sixteen townships in Buchanan County, Iowa, United States. As of the 2000 census, its population was 4,540.

== Geography ==
Washington Township covers an area of 36.4 square miles (94 km^{2}) and contains one incorporated settlement, Independence (the county seat). The unincorporated community of Otterville also lies in the township. According to the USGS, it contains three cemeteries: German Catholic, Otterville and Saint Johns.
