= Oxford Mills =

Oxford Mills may refer to:

- Oxford Mills, Iowa, a community in the United States
- Oxford Mills, Ontario, a community in Canada
