= Otterville, Iowa =

- Unincorporated community
- Location within the state of Iowa Otterville, Iowa (the United States)
- Coordinates: 42°30′31″N 91°56′48″W
- Country: United States
- State: Iowa
- County: Buchanan
- Elevation: 922 ft (281 m)
- Time zone: UTC-6 (Central (CST))
  - Summer (DST): UTC-5 (CDT)
- GNIS feature ID: 459950

Otterville is a small unincorporated community in Buchanan County, Iowa, United States, northwest of Independence.

== Geography ==
Otterville lies in section 9 of Washington Township. It is at the junction of Otterville Blvd (County Highway D16) and Henley Avenue.

== History ==
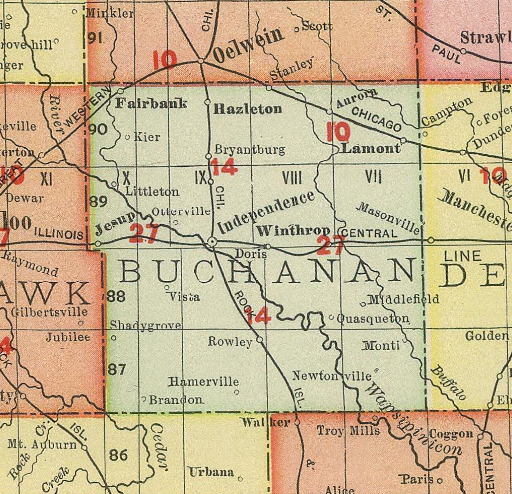
Otterville in west-central Buchanan County, Iowa, in 1903

Although the community was founded in the 19th century, the townsfolk never incorporated the community. Otterville remains a small community halfway between Independence and Littleton.

Otterville's population was 94 in 1900, and was 100 in 1925. The population was 50 in 1940.

== See also ==
- Wapsipinicon River
