= Munson Building =

- U.S. National Register of Historic Places
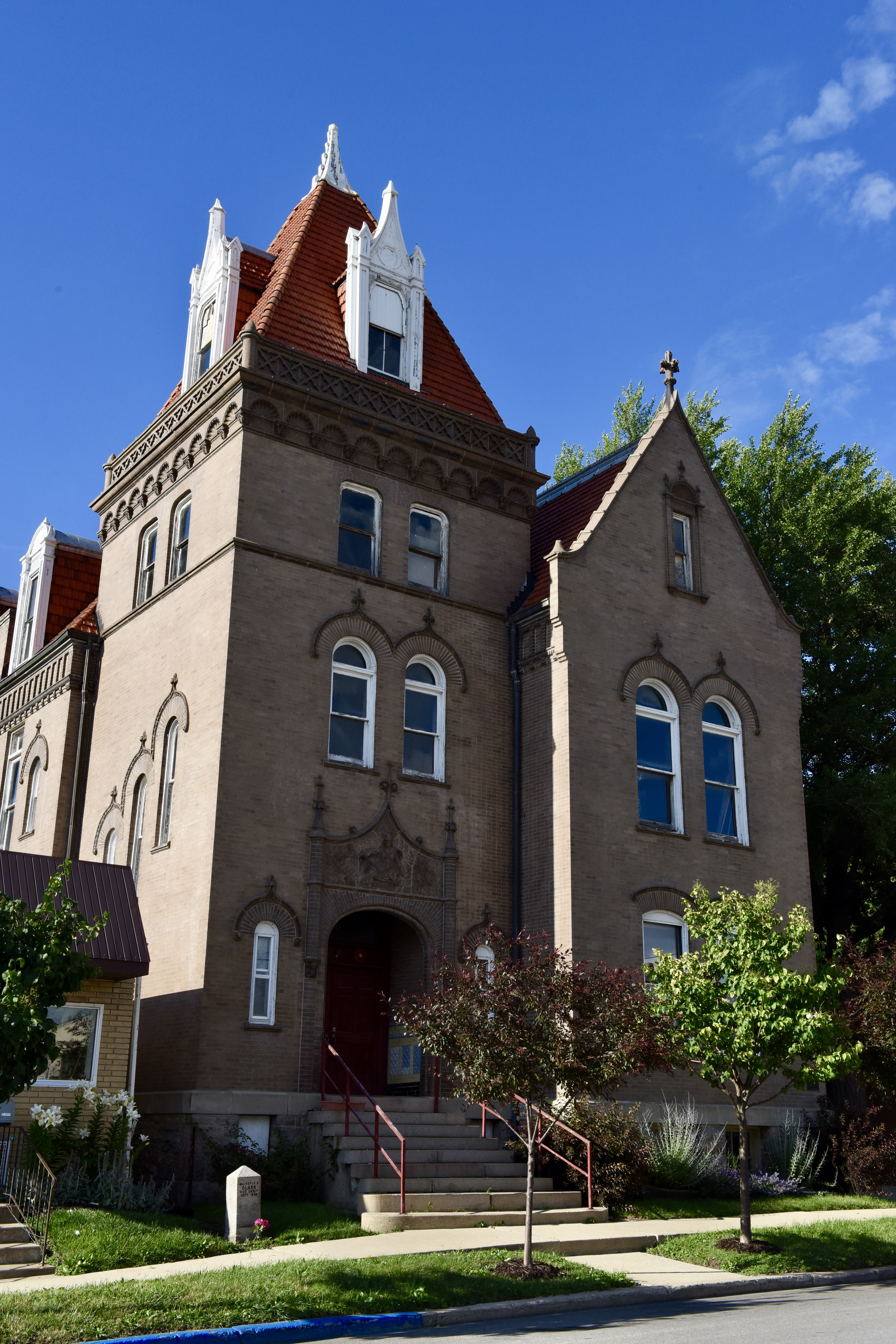

- Location within Iowa Location within the United States
- Location: 210 2nd St., NE. Independence, Iowa
- Coordinates: 42°28′12″N 91°53′33″W
- Built: 1893
- Architectural style: Late Victorian
- NRHP reference No.: 76000736
- Added to NRHP: November 21, 1976

The Munson Building is a historic building located in Independence, Iowa, United States. The Late Victorian French Renaissance style building was built in 1893. The three-story brick structure is composed of two symmetrical units that form an asymmetrical structure. It has a four sided tower that is capped with a pointed tile roof and features decorative tin work. The building was named for Perry Munson, a local businessman who was a machinist and blacksmith by trade, who bequeathed $5,000 for its construction. The building housed a variety of programs geared toward the community's youth. They were trained in mechanical arts such as printing, drafting, and woodworking. It also housed the Y.M.C.A., public library, Boy Scouts, Girl Scouts, and other community groups. The building was listed on the National Register of Historic Places in 1976.
