= Mathias C. and Eva B. Crowell Fuhrman Farm =

Historic district in Iowa, United States

- U.S. National Register of Historic Places
- U.S. Historic district
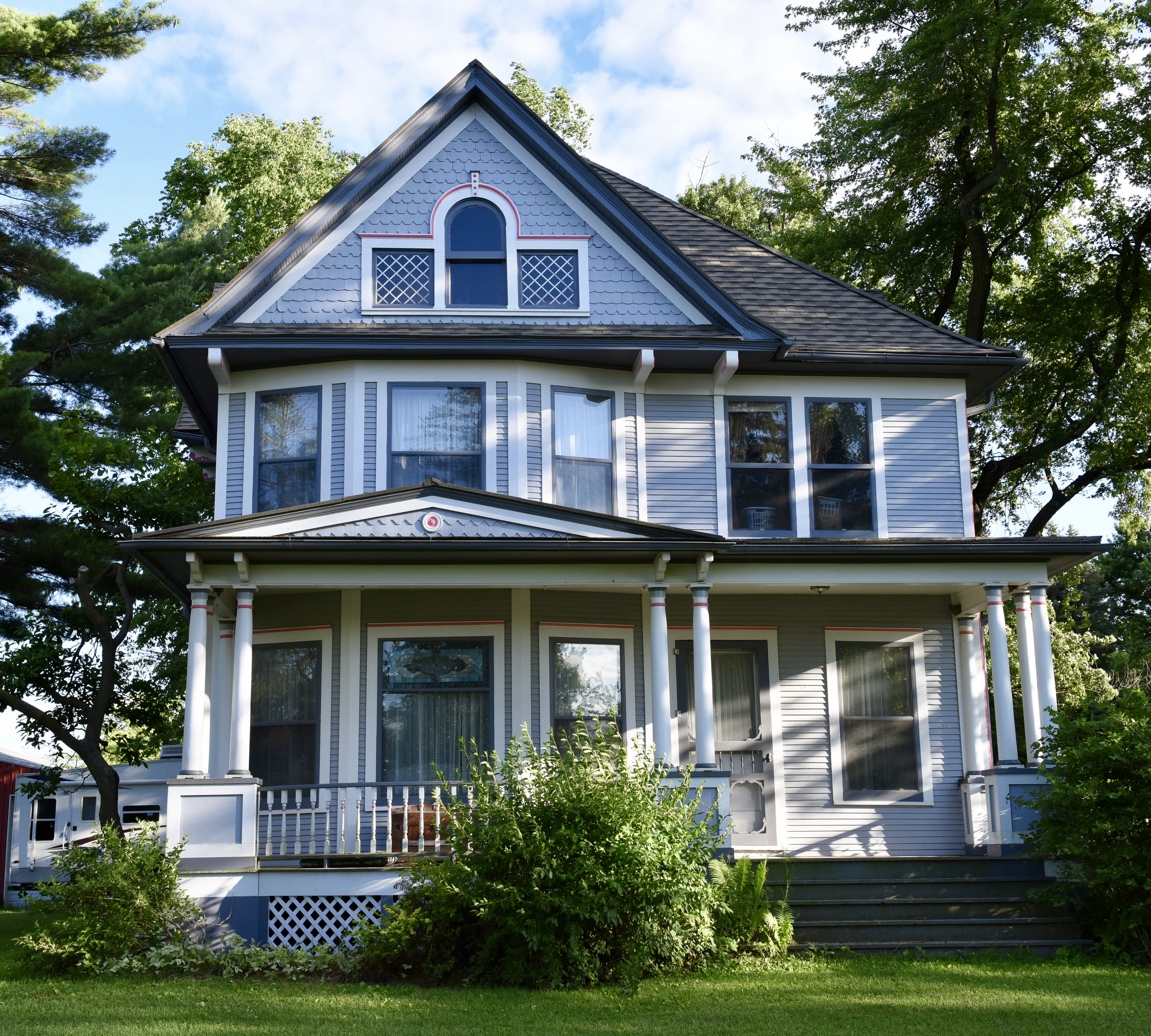
- House (1906)

- Location within Iowa Location within the United States
- Location: 1780 185th St.
- Nearest city: Independence, Iowa
- Coordinates: 42°31′06″N 91°55′42″W
- Area: 5 acres (2.0 ha)
- Built by: Frank Harrington
- Architectural style: Queen Anne; Classical Revival
- NRHP reference No.: 97000213
- Added to NRHP: May 1, 1998

The Mathias C. and Eva B. Crowell Fuhrman Farm is an agricultural historic district located north of Independence, Iowa, United States. At the time of its nomination it consisted of seven resources, which included three contributing buildings, two contributing sites, one non-contributing building, and one non-contributing structure. The significance of the district is attributed to its being a collection of farm related buildings that exemplify the changes in farming in the local area. The contributing buildings include the 1906 Queen Anne house, the 1901 frame barn with a gambrel roof, the 1920s corncrib, and the ruins of the 1920s hog house and a stable (1865). The stable is believed to date from the original development of the farmstead. The metal machine shed and a silo are the non-contributing elements. Three generations of the Fuhrman family operated the farm until it was sold to Tom and Beth Greenley. The district was listed on the National Register of Historic Places in 1998.
