= Robert R. and Julia L. Plane House =

Historic house in Iowa, United States

- U.S. National Register of Historic Places
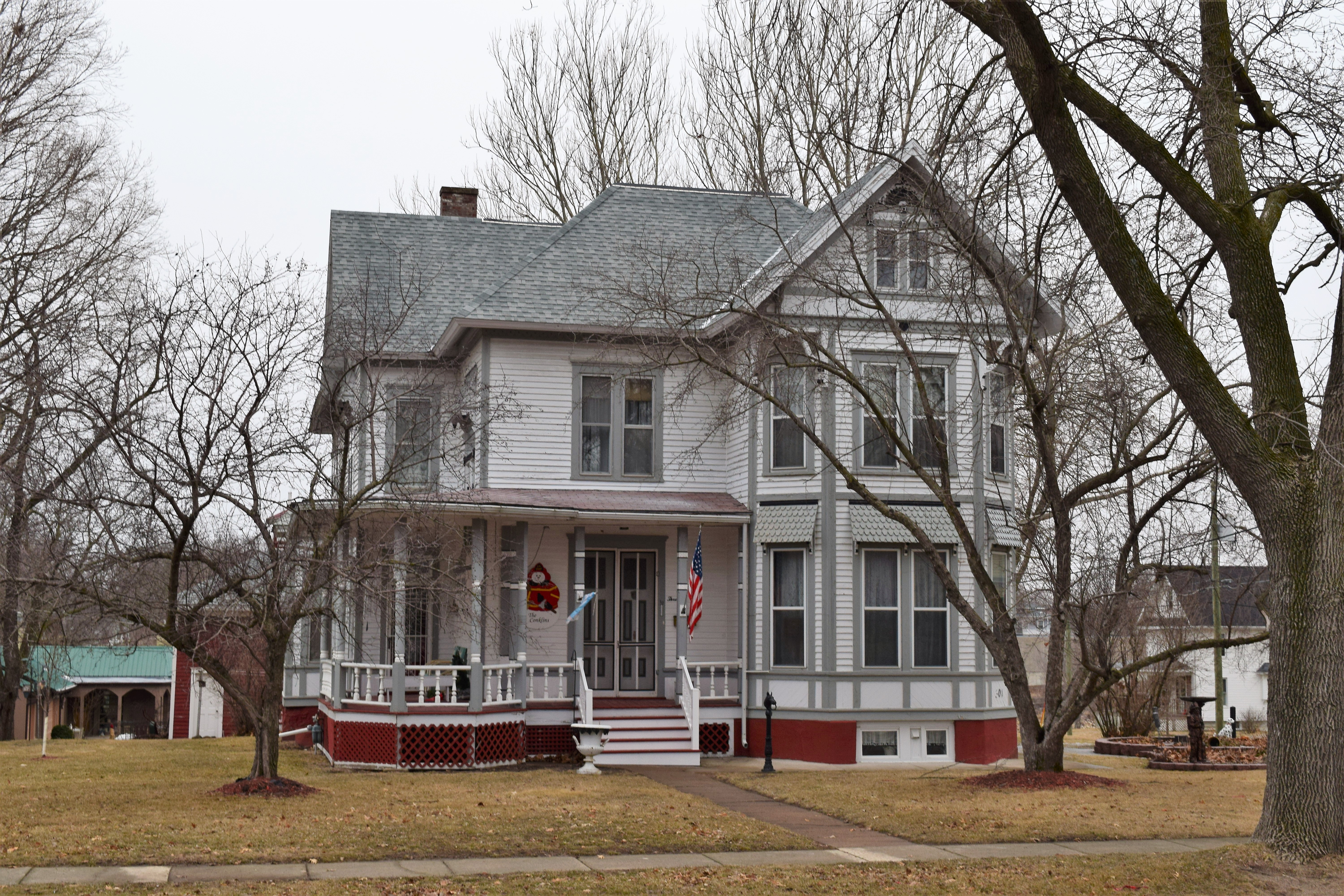

- Location within Iowa Location within the United States
- Location: 301 3rd Ave., SE. Independence, Iowa
- Coordinates: 42°27′59″N 91°53′31″W
- Built: 1885
- Built by: Jacob Manz
- Architectural style: Stick Style
- NRHP reference No.: 99001030
- Added to NRHP: August 27, 1999

The Robert R. and Julia L. Plane House is a historic residence located in Independence, Iowa, United States. Built in 1885, this 2½-story frame house is locally significant as an intact example of the Stick Style. The construction of the house is attributed to local builder Jacob Manz, a German immigrant who lived in several places in the United States before settling in Independence. The decoration of the house remained consistent, even after an addition was built onto the back and the enlargement of the front porch. Robert and Julia Plane were married in 1882. She was his second wife as his first wife Emeline had died in 1878. He owned a hardware store downtown. The house was listed on the National Register of Historic Places in 1999.
