= Lee House (Independence, Iowa) =

Historic house in Iowa, United States

- Captain Daniel S. and Fannie L. (Brooks) Lee House
- U.S. National Register of Historic Places
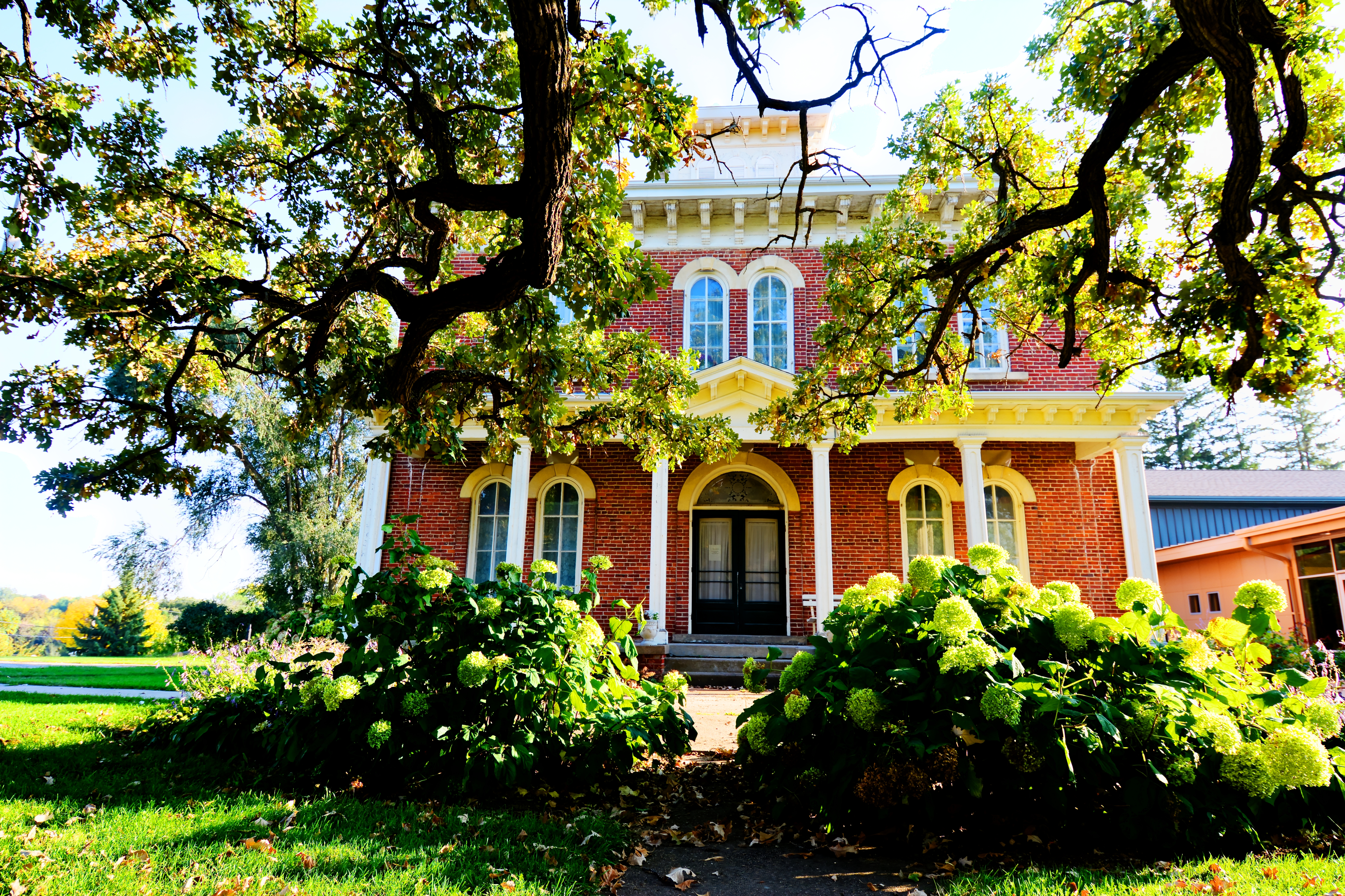

- Location within Iowa
- Location: 801 1st St. E. Independence, Iowa
- Coordinates: 42°27′58″N 91°53′5″W
- Area: 0.9 acres (0.36 ha)
- NRHP reference No.: 09001203
- Added to NRHP: January 7, 2010

The Lee House, also known as Lee, Captain Daniel S. and Fannie L. (Brooks), House, in Independence, Iowa was built in 1867 by David J. Roberts.

According to the nomination form prepared by the Buchanan County Historical Society:

The Lee house, built in 1867, is an excellent example of the Italianate Style of domestic architecture, popular in the United States from approximately 1840-1885. Its simple cubical form, symmetrical proportions, belvedere, and extensive use of brackets are typical of the style. Daniel S. Lee was a prominent early settler in Independence. Lee became the first volunteer from Buchanan County to fight in the Civil War and helped raise a company of men to join him. In 1917 the house became the home of the Peoples Memorial AKA Peoples Hospital. Despite its use as a hospital, the Lee house retains its integrity of design, materials and workmanship.

At the time, in 2010, the Buchanan County Historical Society was planning to renovate the building "as funding permits", furnish it with historical pieces from their collection, and to operate it as a house museum and meeting facility. In 2016, all of that was still planned, per the Society's website.

The building was listed on the U.S. National Register of Historic Places on January 7, 2010. The listing was announced as the featured listing in the National Park Service's weekly list of January 15, 2010.
