= Pleasant Grove Presbyterian Church (Chatham, Iowa) =

- U.S. National Register of Historic Places
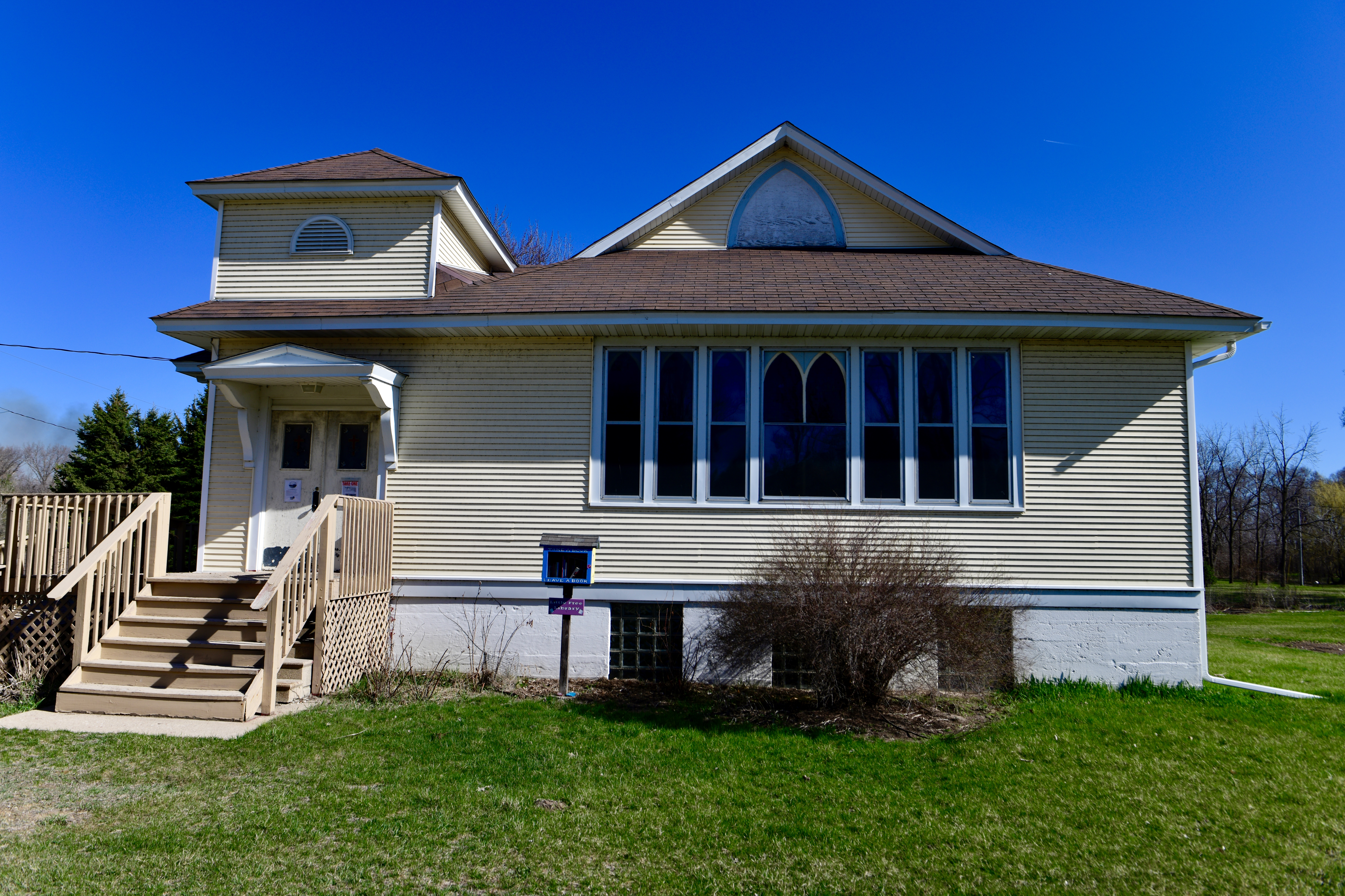
- The building in 2018

- Location within Iowa Location within the United States
- Location: 601 State St. Chatham, Iowa
- Coordinates: 42°32′01″N 92°01′23″W
- Area: 1 acre (0.40 ha)
- Built: 1907
- Built by: F. W. Chapman; Tabor Construction Co. Menzel
- Architectural style: Late 19th and Early 20th Century American Movements
- NRHP reference No.: 100001697
- Added to NRHP: October 4, 2017

Pleasant Grove Presbyterian Church is a historic building located in the small community of Chatham, Iowa, United States. It is located along the road that borders the towns of both Chatham and Littleton, which are both in Perry Township. The building's significance is associated with its architecture. The design of the wood frame structure is more reminiscent of a schoolhouse than a church building. There are no church buildings similar in style in the area. F. W. Chapman, of Waterloo, Iowa was responsible for the carpentry work, Tabor Construction Company poured the foundation, and Menzel, also of Waterloo, installed the windows. The windows incorporate the pointed Gothic arch. The building was constructed for $2,910.35.

Pleasant Grove Presbyterian was founded by the Rev. James S. Fullerton and Elder Vaughn of Marion, Iowa in 1853 before the villages of Chatham and Littleton were established. The congregation first met in a log schoolhouse. They moved to Chatham after its establishment in 1856. The Rev. John D. Caldwell was the first resident pastor. Initially, the Presbyterians shared the stone schoolhouse there with the Methodist congregation. Pleasant Grove built their first church in 1865. It was moved in 1907 to make room for the present church building. The congregation disbanded for lack of numbers in 2014. The building was listed on the National Register of Historic Places in 2017. It was donated to the Littleton and Chatham Historical Society for use as a museum and community building.
