= Eliphalet W. and Catherine E. Jaquish Purdy House =

Historic house in Iowa, United States

- U.S. National Register of Historic Places
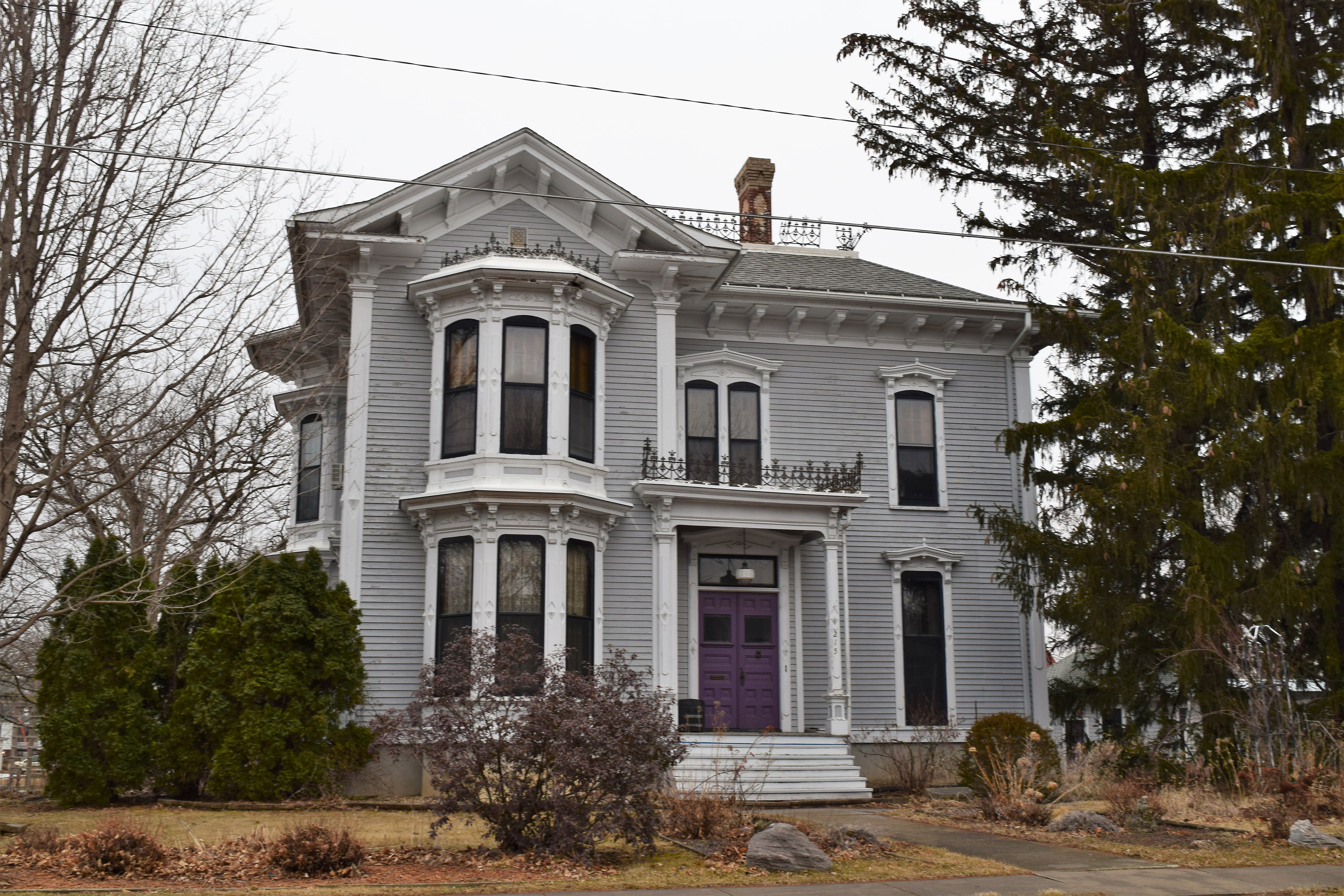

- Location within Iowa Location within the United States
- Location: 215 3rd Ave., SW. Independence, Iowa
- Coordinates: 42°28′01″N 91°53′48″W
- Built: 1881-1882
- Built by: David J. Roberts
- Architectural style: Italianate
- NRHP reference No.: 96000237
- Added to NRHP: March 7, 1996

The Eliphalet W. and Catherine E. Jaquish Purdy House is a historic residence located in Independence, Iowa, United States. Built in 1882, this 2½-story frame house is locally significant as the best example of the Italianate style in town. Eliphalet W. Purdy and Catherine E. Jaquish were both New York natives who were married in 1851. They relocated to Galena, Illinois before settling in Independence in 1856. He established the Montour House, a respected hotel located downtown. Three generations of the Purdy family lived here until Dennis and Maxine Goodyear bought the house in 1985. This is one of five houses in Independence with similar ornamentation and floor plan, but this house is the largest and least altered. It was listed on the National Register of Historic Places in 1996.
