= 280th Street Bridge =

- U.S. National Register of Historic Places
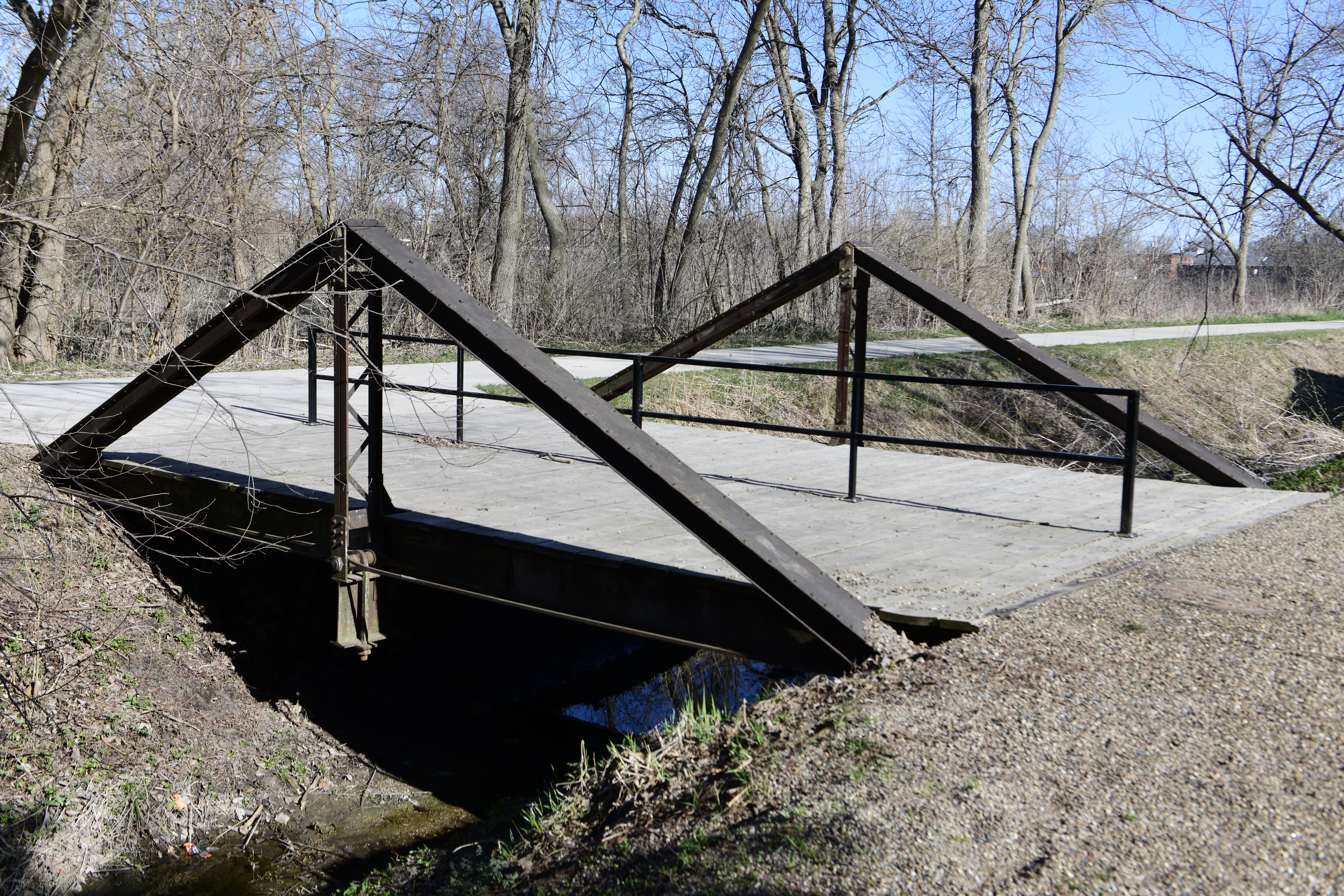

- Location within Iowa Location within the United States
- Location: 280th St. over an unnamed stream
- Nearest city: Independence, Iowa
- Coordinates: 42°23′06″N 91°56′34″W
- Built: 1898
- Architect: D.H. Young
- Architectural style: Pony truss
- MPS: Highway Bridges of Iowa MPS
- NRHP reference No.: 98000756
- Added to NRHP: June 25, 1998

The 280th Street Bridge is a historic structure located southwest of Independence, Iowa, United States. It spans an unnamed creek for 39 feet (12 m). The Buchanan County Board of Supervisors contracted with D.H. Young, a contractor from Manchester, Iowa, to build eight bridges for $3,304.70. This bridge is a steel, pin-connected king post pony truss, that has a timber stringer approach span. It was listed on the National Register of Historic Places in 1998.
