= Wapsipinicon Almanac =

American almanac (1988–2018)

- Frequency: Annual
- Format: Hot metal typeset; Letterpress
- Circulation: 1,500
- Founder: Timothy Fay
- First issue: 1988
- Final issue Number: 2018; Vol. 25
- Company: Rt. 3 Press
- Language: English
- OCLC: 1021086712

The Wapsipinicon Almanac was an almanac published by Timothy Fay in Anamosa, Iowa, from May 1988 until 2018. It was handmade on antique letterpress equipment by Fay and featured stories, reviews, essays, and poems. The first issue, published in 1988, sold out, and the publication subsequently became a staple of the Iowa literary scene, including coverage by Iowa Public Television and a reading from Prairie Lights Books in Iowa City.

== Publication ==
Fay started the almanac in Anamosa, Iowa, "to silence anyone who thinks Iowa doesn't have a literary culture". The almanac had contributions from many people in Iowa. It featured stories, reviews, essays, and poems. The almanac was created using a 1936 Linotype machine with slugs (coincidentally, 1936 was also the year when the renowned Iowa Writers' Workshop was founded). The slugs were placed by hand "alongside engravings, decorative borders, and ads." Eight pages at once were then sent through a 1950s flatbed letterpress printing press, of which not many were made. Upon completion, each page was sent through a folding machine, creating "16-page booklets" that were placed together for several days between wooden blocks so that the final product was flat. Each spine was hand-tied, stapled together, and trimmed with a paper cutter. The cover of every magazine was "glued on with a paintbrush—and positioned, spine down, for drying". The almanac was published every fall with 1,500 batches and it took editor Fay a year and a few weeks to complete each mass publication. The line casting operator was Eldon Meeks and the proofreader was Marge Hummel. The almanac was distributed "through a mailing list, while others" were "delivered to local bookstores, co-ops and places where people who would like them would find them."

The final issue was published in 2018 with a total number of 25 issues. The cover was created by Iowa City artist Will Thomson. Fay said of the final publication, "I’ve always really loved doing this, but I want to go out feeling good about it. And I don’t want it to rust out. I feel very strongly about that." There were no plans of someone taking over the almanac. On January 25, 2019, Prairie Lights Books in Iowa City held a reading to commemorate the 25th issue which included Fay and the almanac's guest contributors.

== Reception ==
Initial reception was positive with the first issue selling out and Iowa Public Television featuring the almanac in a story. Morgan Halgren started the story with, "It’s called the Wapsipinicon Almanac, and though totally unassuming, it is as pretty, and as thought-provoking, and as winding, and as alive as the valley from which it takes its name." Meredith Siemsen of The Iowa Source said, "In addition to darn good writing, part of the real appeal of the Wapsi is that it’s printed on an antique press. If you’re under the age of 60, there’s a good chance you’ve only ever seen the likes of this sort of equipment in museums."
