= Robert Byron Tabor =

American painter (1882–1972)

- 1964 photograph
- Born: 1882; Independence, Iowa, U.S.
- Died: 1972 (aged 89–90); Olathe, Kansas, U.S.
- Occupation: Painter

Robert Byron Tabor (1882–1972) was an American painter. He began his painting career when he was 51 years old. His artwork has been featured in the Museum of Modern Art, the Joslyn Art Museum, the White House, and other places. Tabor's first major artwork was Vendue in 1934 and his last major one was Discovery in 1962.

== Personal life ==
Tabor was born in Independence, Iowa, in 1882. In 1933 during the Great Depression, Tabor had to leave his traveling paint salesman job in Cedar Rapids, Iowa. At the time, he was 51 years old with a wife and three children in Independence. Tabor's reproduction of Winslow Homer's 1885 painting The Herring Net was damaged that same year when it dropped from its nailed spot on his wall. Tabor decided to replace the painting with one of his own, and his family had no enthusiasm for it due to him having no artistic experience. He began painting several days later by using oil paints and canvas, but he threw away his first projects as failures. He died in 1972 in Olathe, Kansas, when he was 90 years old.

== Career ==
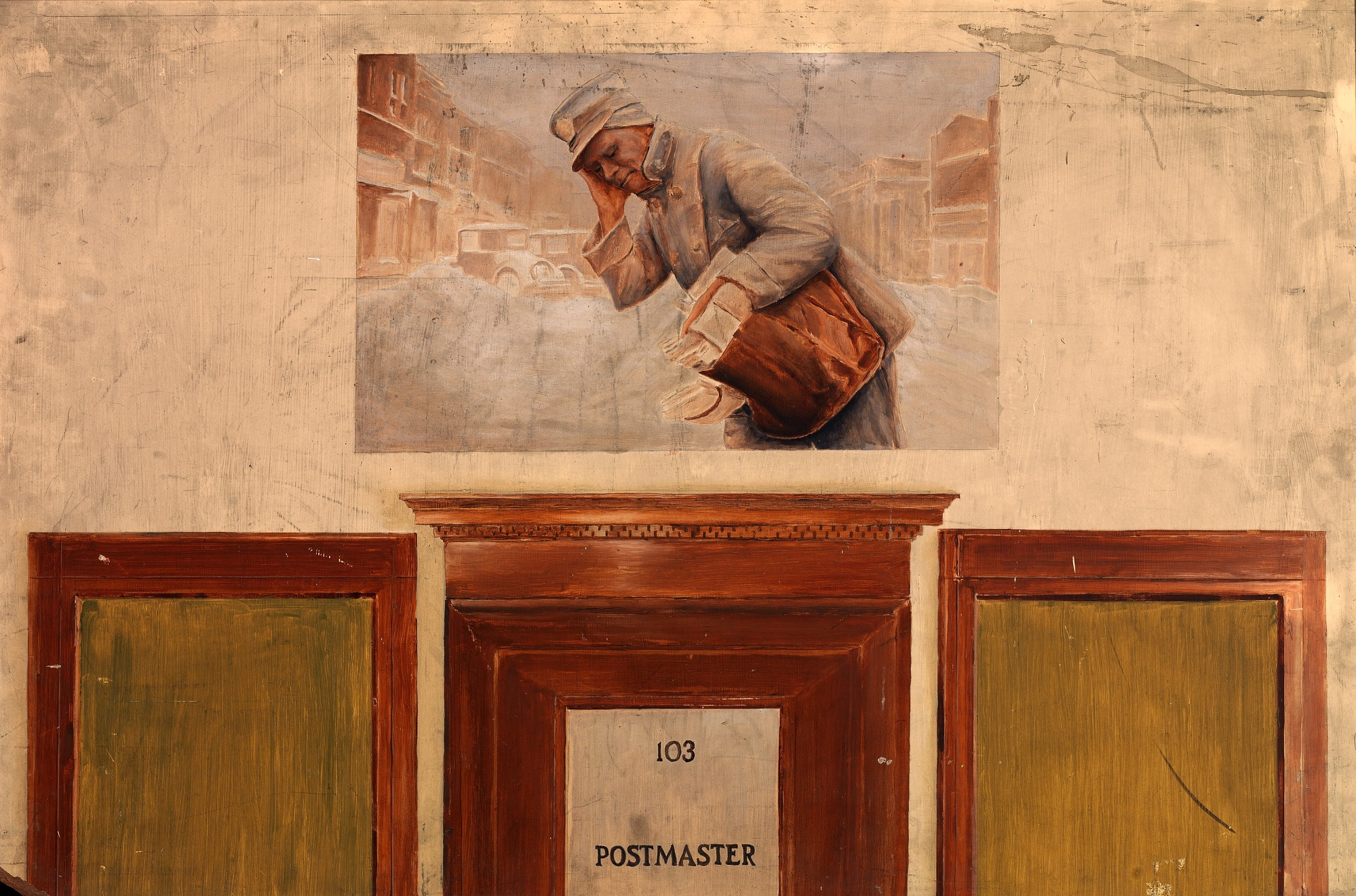
Mural study for Tabor's Postman in Storm, oil on fiberboard, Smithsonian American Art Museum

After gaining respect for his painting from his family, his wife Ruth read a December 1933 newspaper article about the formation of the Public Works of Art Project. The Project paid artists weekly, but applicants had to show their artistic abilities. The Iowa branch of the art project was run by painter Grant Wood, who allowed Tabor to join despite not liking Tabor's paintings. Wood said that it was "against his better judgment" but that he could not "turn anyone down in times like these". Tabor revealed his painting Vendue a month later, which depicted an Iowa farm being sold. Vendue was part of a competition with 15,000 other paintings, with it later being part of a Corcoran Gallery of Art exhibition in 1934 with 600 other works. President Franklin D. Roosevelt and First Lady Eleanor Roosevelt saw Vendue at the exhibition, and they chose to display at the White House, where it likely remained until the late 1940s or early 1950s. At some point before the White House display, Vendue was shown at the Museum of Modern Art. An article in the 1956 issue of the magazine Coronet stated that Tabor's inspiration for Vendue was from farm owner Joseph McGrady of Independence. The original painting is missing, but a working sketch was exhibited in Oelwein in October 1972. His paintings also were shown at the Joslyn Art Museum.

Tabor was hired to paint a mural for the Independence post office named Postman in Storm: a sketch of this mural is held by the Smithsonian American Art Museum. His other artwork included Main Street which is displayed in Independence's library, and The Four Seasons on an Iowa Farm for Hotel Pinicon in the same city, later donated to the Rod Library at the University of Northern Iowa.

In 1962, Tabor's final major painting was Discovery, which featured physicist James Van Allen and Allen's three co-workers discovering the Van Allen radiation belt. Olathe News said in 1964 that Discovery is the "only recording" of the Van Allen radiation belt discovery. Discovery is displayed at the Van Allen Hall at the University of Iowa, on loan from the Van Allen family.

Tabor founded an art society in Oelwein, Iowa. Toward the end of his life, Tabor continued to paint and worked to create an art guild in Olathe, Kansas. His papers are held by the University of Iowa, donated by his daughter Ruth.
