= Dr. Judd C. and Margaret S. Clarke Shellito House =

Historic house in Iowa, United States

- U.S. National Register of Historic Places
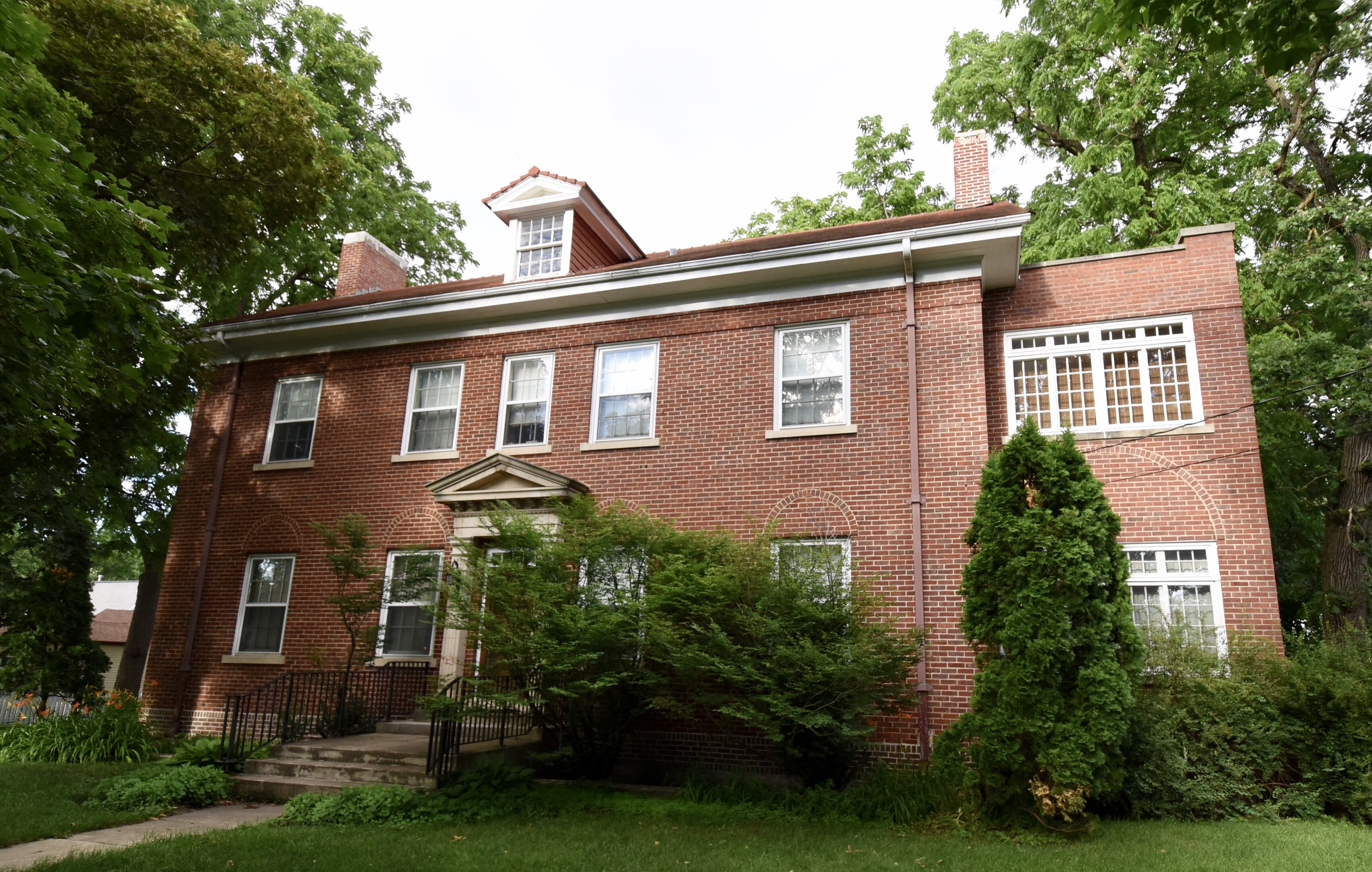

- Location within Iowa Location within the United States
- Location: 310 5th Ave., SE. Independence, Iowa
- Coordinates: 42°27′58″N 91°53′20″W
- Built: 1917
- Architect: Harry E. Netcott
- Architectural style: Colonial Revival
- NRHP reference No.: 96001588
- Added to NRHP: January 16, 1997

The Dr. Judd C. and Margaret S. Clarke Shellito House is a historic residence located in Independence, Iowa, United States. Built in 1917, this 2½-story brick house is locally significant as the best example of the Colonial Revival style in town. It was designed by Independence architect Harry E. Netcott. The main block of the house is five bays wide. There is a two-story solarium on the south side. The main entrance is framed by classical pilasters and pediment composed of cut stone. The house was a wedding present from Dr. Amos G. and Nellie Sheilito, to their son and his new wife. At the time the house was completed Judd was serving in the military during World War I. He died in an auto accident west of Cedar Rapids in 1933. Margaret died in 1984. Three years prior the Rev. Dr. Eugene and Marna Hancock bought the house from the Shellito family. Because of the stability of ownership, the house has changed very little. It was listed on the National Register of Historic Places in 1997.
