= Wapsipinicon Mill =

- U.S. National Register of Historic Places
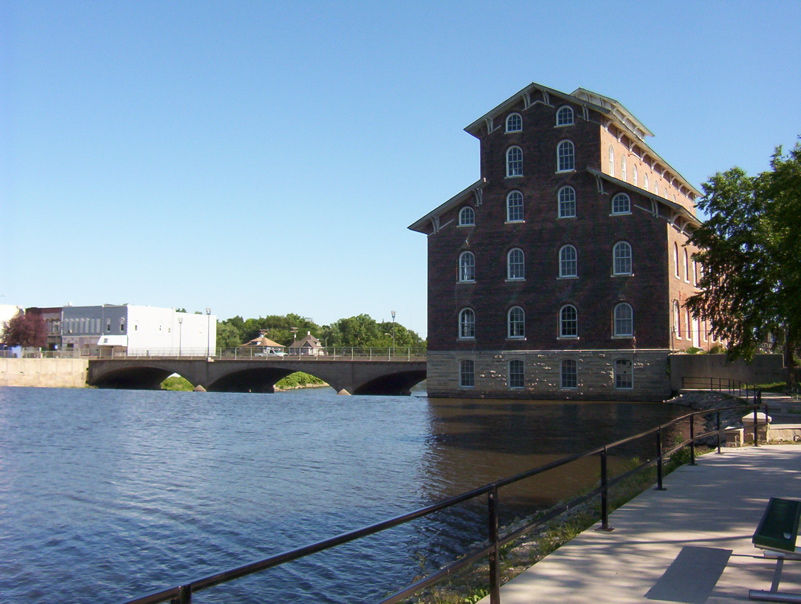

- Location within Iowa Location within the United States
- Location: 100 1st St., W. Independence, Iowa
- Coordinates: 42°28′08″N 91°53′43″W
- Built: 1867
- NRHP reference No.: 75000678
- Added to NRHP: April 21, 1975

The Wapsipinicon Mill is a historic industrial building located in Independence, Iowa, United States. The first mill built on this site was completed in 1854. It was replaced by the present structure in 1867. Part of its foundation is the original mill. The 1867 mill is a five-story graduated basilica form structure with a stone foundation and brick walls. It features gable roofs with bracketed eaves and round and segmental arched windows. The mill was listed on the National Register of Historic Places in 1975. It continued to operate as a mill until 1976, when the Buchanan County Historical Society acquired it and they operate it as a museum.
