= Oxford Mills, Iowa =

- Unincorporated community
- Location within Iowa Location within the United States
- Coordinates: 41°58′13″N 90°57′36″W
- Country: United States
- State: Iowa
- County: Jones
- Elevation: 738 ft (225 m)
- Time zone: UTC-6 (Central (CST))
  - Summer (DST): UTC-5 (CDT)
- Area code: 563
- GNIS feature ID: 459978

Oxford Mills is an unincorporated community in Jones County, Iowa, United States. Oxford Mills is located on the Wapsipinicon River, south of Oxford Junction.

== History ==
Oxford Mills was the first settlement in Oxford Township. It was named after a gristmill built there in 1857. A post office operated in Oxford Mills from 1862 to 1918 The population was estimated at 200 in 1940.
