= State Savings Bank (Quasqueton, Iowa) =

- U.S. National Register of Historic Places
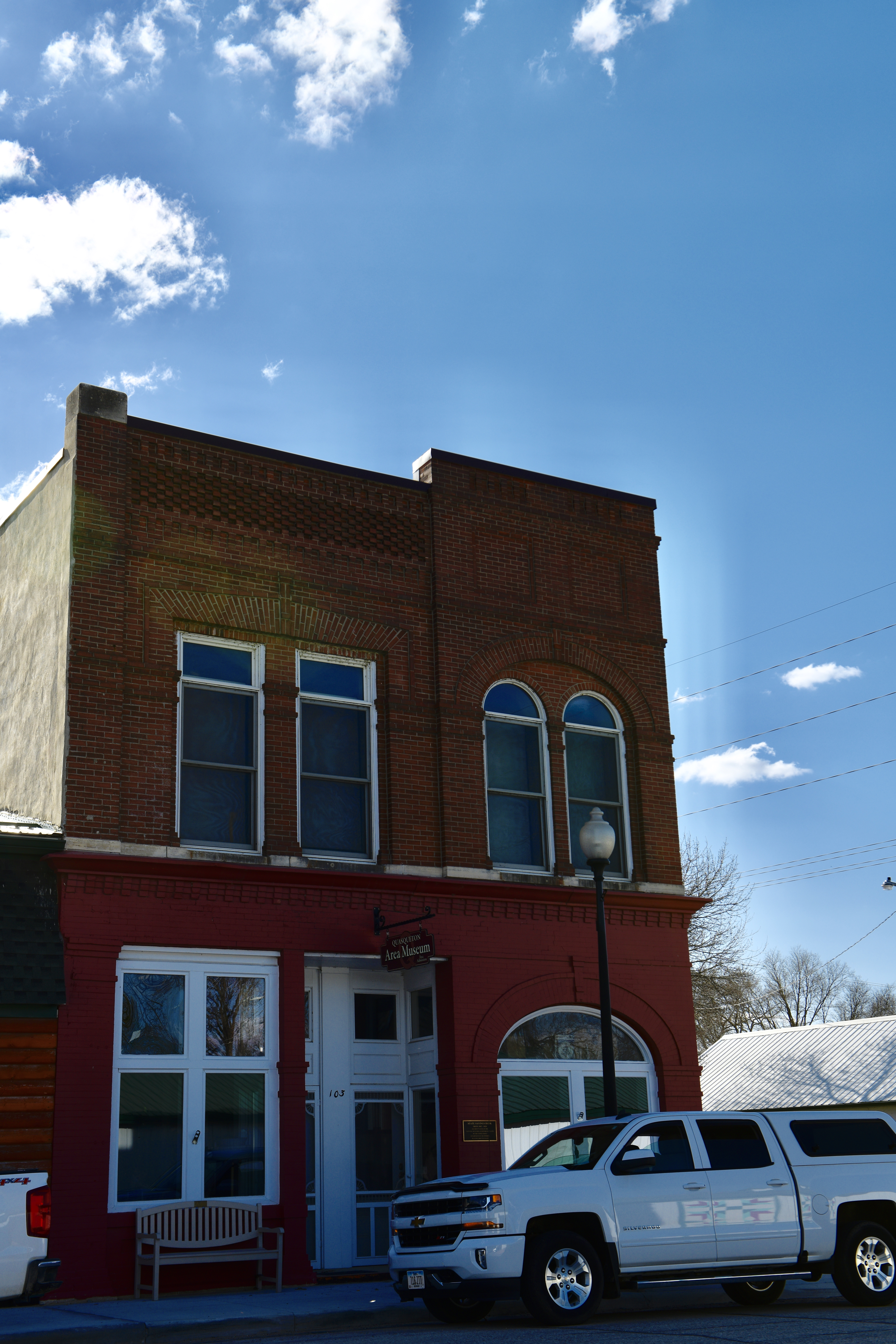

- Location within Iowa Location within the United States
- Location: 103 N. Water St. Quasqueton, Iowa
- Coordinates: 42°23′40″N 91°45′41″W
- Area: less than one acre
- Built: 1902
- Architectural style: Romanesque Revival
- NRHP reference No.: 99001031
- Added to NRHP: August 27, 1999

State Savings Bank is a historic building located in Quasqueton, Iowa, United States. It was originally built as a three-story warehouse and commercial sales building in 1852. In 1902 it was significantly altered. The building was reduced to two stories, and it was given a completely new facade in the Romanesque Revival style. Since that time it has housed a bank and a series of retail stores. The building is thought to be unique in Buchanan County in that its facade is completely composed of brick, while other Romanesque Revival commercial buildings have store fronts of cast iron, wood, and glass. It was listed on the National Register of Historic Places in 1999.
