= Perry Township, Buchanan County, Iowa =

Township in Iowa, US

Perry Township, Buchanan County
- Township
- Coordinates: 42°30′26″N 092°01′10″W
- Country: United States
- State: Iowa
- County: Buchanan

Area
  - Total: 36.09 sq mi (93.47 km^{2})
  - Land: 36.06 sq mi (93.39 km^{2})
  - Water: 0.027 sq mi (0.07 km^{2})
- Elevation: 955 ft (291 m)

Population (2000)
  - Total: 3,044
  - Density: 84/sq mi (32.6/km^{2})
- FIPS code: 19-93294
- GNIS feature ID: 0468506

Perry Township is one of sixteen townships in Buchanan County, Iowa, USA. As of the 2000 census, its population was 3,044.

== Geography ==
Perry Township covers an area of 36.09 square miles (93.5 km^{2}) and contains one incorporated settlement, Jesup. The unincorporated community of Littleton is also in the township. According to the USGS, the township contains four cemeteries: Cedar Crest, Littleton, Saint Athanasius and Saint Michaels.
