= Richardson-Jakway House =

Historic house in Iowa, United States

- U.S. National Register of Historic Places
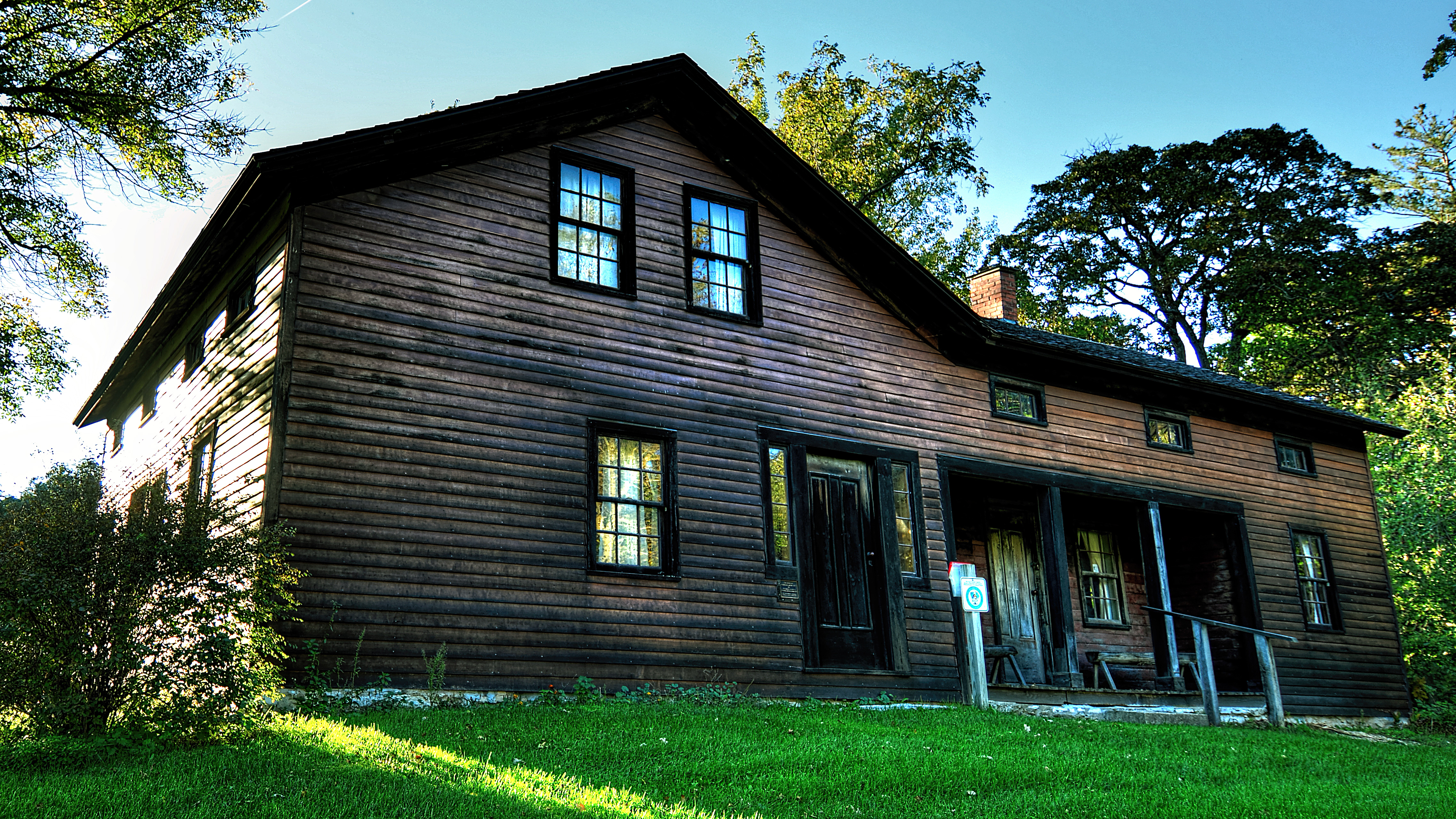

- Location within Iowa Location within the United States
- Location: Rural Route #1
- Nearest city: Aurora, Iowa
- Coordinates: 42°35′20″N 91°43′46″W
- Built: 1851
- NRHP reference No.: 85001382
- Added to NRHP: June 27, 1985

The Richardson-Jakway House is a historic residence located south of Aurora, Iowa, United States. Maine native Abiathar Richardson settled in Buchanan County in 1849 and built this house in 1851. It is a 1½-story heavy timber framed vernacular house. In 1857 he then laid out the town of Buffalo Grove on his property. It was later called Buchanan and then Mudville. Richardson was the first postmaster, and it is thought his house served as the first post office and possibly as a hotel. The town started to decline rapidly when the railroad went to the north in 1886 and Aurora was established. It became part of a farmstead after the town disappeared. The house stayed in the Richardson family until 1895 when Charles Jakway bought it. The Jakway family retained it until 1967. The Buchanan County Conservation Commission acquired it in 1969, and it is now a part of Jakway Forest County Park. It was listed on the National Register of Historic Places in 1985.
