= Littleton, Iowa =

- Unincorporated community
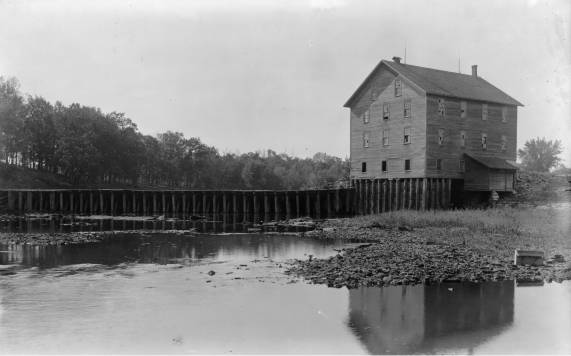
- Former Historic Water Mill in Littleton

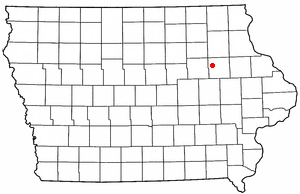
- Location of Littleton, Iowa
- Coordinates: 42°32′00″N 92°01′25″W
- Country: United States
- State: Iowa
- County: Buchanan
- Elevation: 932 ft (284 m)
- Time zone: UTC-6 (Central (CST))
  - Summer (DST): UTC-5 (CDT)
- GNIS feature ID: 458534

Littleton is an unincorporated community in Buchanan County, Iowa, United States, northwest of Independence.

== Geography ==
Littleton lies in sections 9 and 10 of Perry Township. It is at the junction of Littleton Blvd and County Highway D16 (175th Street).

== History ==
Littleton was platted in 1855, by Moses Little, while Chatham was platted by Robert W. Wright. Chatham was in Section 10 of the Perry Township, with Littleton on the other side in Section 9. The Chatham post office was established in 1851, before being switched to the name Littleton in the 1880s.

In 1900, its population was 88.

The population of Littleton was estimated at 100 in 1920. It was 75 in 1940. The town had 250 persons in 1960.

== See also ==
- Wapsipinicon River
