= Wapsipinicon River =

River in Iowa and Minnesota, United States

Wapsipinicon River Wapsie River, Wabespinicon River, Wapsiepinnecon River
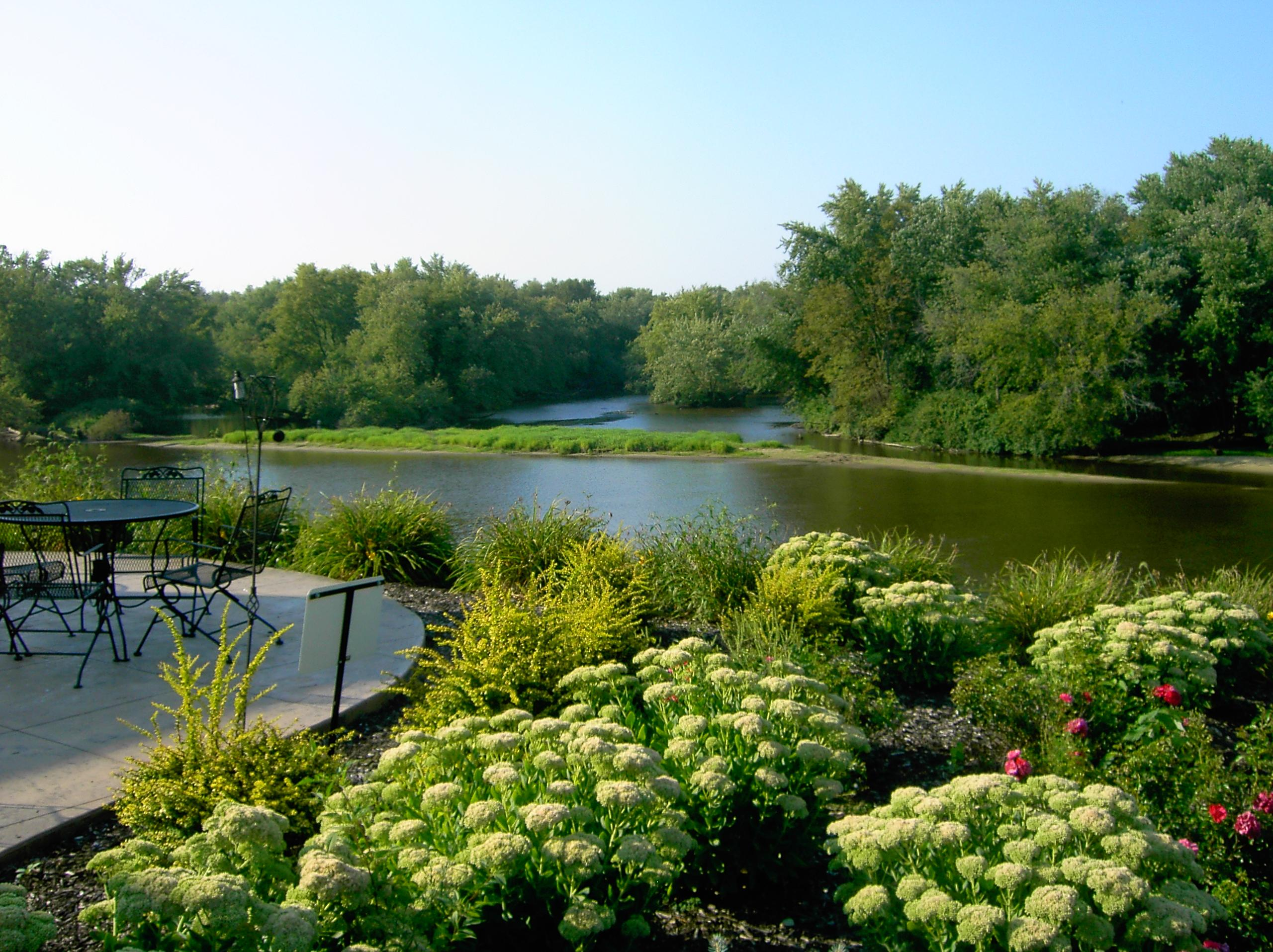
- Wapsipinicon River in Independence, Iowa on August 25, 2013

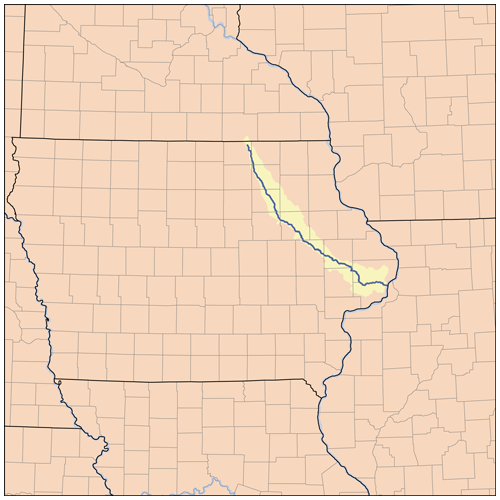
- Wapsipinicon River highlighted

Location
- Country: US
- State: Iowa and Minnesota
- District: Scott County, Iowa, Clinton County, Iowa, Cedar County, Iowa, Jones County, Iowa, Linn County, Iowa, Buchanan County, Iowa, Black Hawk County, Iowa, Bremer County, Iowa, Chickasaw County, Iowa, Howard County, Iowa, Mitchell County, Iowa, Mower County, Minnesota

Physical characteristics
- Source
  - location: 3/4 mile south of Taopi, Minnesota
  - coordinates: 43°32′55″N 92°38′40″W
  - elevation: 1,348 ft (411 m)
- Mouth: Mississippi River
  - coordinates: 41°43′47″N 90°19′11″W
  - elevation: 574 ft (175 m)
- Length: 299.5 mi (482.0 km)
- Discharge
  - location: De Witt, Iowa
  - average: 1,818 cu/ft. per sec.

The Wapsipinicon River (/wɒpsɪˈpɪnɪkɒn, -kən/, locally known as the Wapsie) is a tributary of the Mississippi River, approximately 300 miles (480 km) long, starting near the southeastern border of Minnesota and running through northeastern Iowa in the United States. It drains a rural farming region of rolling hills and bluffs north of Waterloo and Cedar Rapids.

== Course ==
It rises in Mower County, Minnesota and enters Iowa in northern Mitchell County. It flows generally southeast across rural Chickasaw, Bremer, and Buchanan counties, past Independence and Anamosa. Along its lower 25 miles (40 km) it turns east, forming the boundary between Clinton and Scott counties. It joins the Mississippi from the west approximately 10 miles (16 km) southwest of Clinton.

It defines the western boundary of the Driftless Area. While the Wapsi has a soft, recent catchment, the Driftless, to the east and north, tumbles down to the Mississippi in rugged canyons.

== Name ==
The name of the river in the Ojibwe language is Waabiziipiniikaan-ziibi ("river abundant in swan-potatoes"), on account of the large quantity of arrowheads or wild artichokes, known as "swan-potatoes" (waabiziipiniin, singular waabiziipin), once found near its banks. Severe flooding on the river in 1993, as part of the larger floods in region, caused widespread damage to the surrounding cropland.

== Cities ==
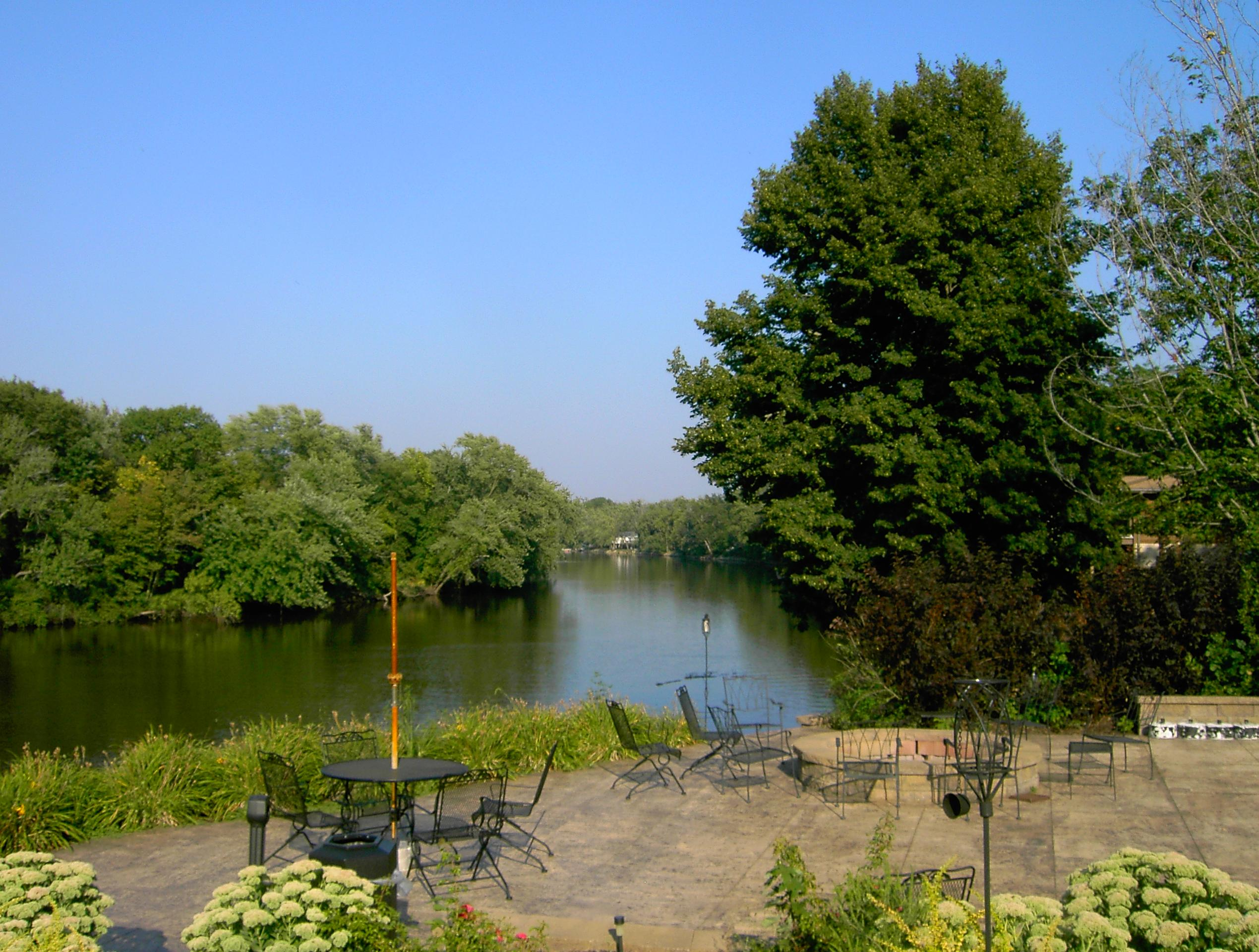
Wapsipinicon River in Buchanan County, Iowa

The Wapsipinicon River runs alongside the Iowa cities and communities of McIntire, Riceville, Deerfield, Elma, Frederika, Tripoli, Littleton, Otterville, Independence, Quasqueton, Troy Mills, Paris, Central City, Waubeek, Stone City, Anamosa, Olin, Oxford Junction, Oxford Mills, Massillon, Toronto, Wheatland, McCausland, Folletts, and Shaffton before emptying into the Mississippi River. Cedar Rock State Park is located on the Wapsipinicon near Quasqueton. Wapsipinicon State Park is located along its southern bank at Anamosa. Many regional parks also border the river.

== Fishing ==
The Wapsipinicon is known for excellent fishing for catfish, although it also contains abundant northern pike, carp, sunfish, and walleye (in some areas).

== See also ==
- Upper Paris Bridge
- List of Iowa rivers
- List of rivers of Minnesota
- List of longest streams of Minnesota
- Wapsipinicon Almanac
