= Independence, Iowa =

City in the United States

Independence
- City
- Old Independence water tower
- Motto: "Celebrate our spirit!"
- Location of Independence, Iowa
- Coordinates: 42°27′58″N 91°53′16″W
- Country: United States
- State: Iowa
- County: Buchanan
- Founded: June 15, 1847
- Incorporated: October 15, 1864

Government
  - Type: Mayor–council government
  - Mayor: Brad Bleichner
  - City Manager: Matthew R. Schmitz, MPA

Area
  - Total: 6.15 sq mi (15.93 km^{2})
  - Land: 6.01 sq mi (15.57 km^{2})
  - Water: 0.14 sq mi (0.36 km^{2})
- Elevation: 912 ft (278 m)

Population (2020)
  - Total: 6,064
  - Density: 1,008.6/sq mi (389.42/km^{2})
- Time zone: UTC-6 (Central (CST))
  - Summer (DST): UTC-5 (CDT)
- ZIP code: 50644
- Area code: 319
- FIPS code: 19-38100
- GNIS feature ID: 2395421
- Website: independenceia.gov

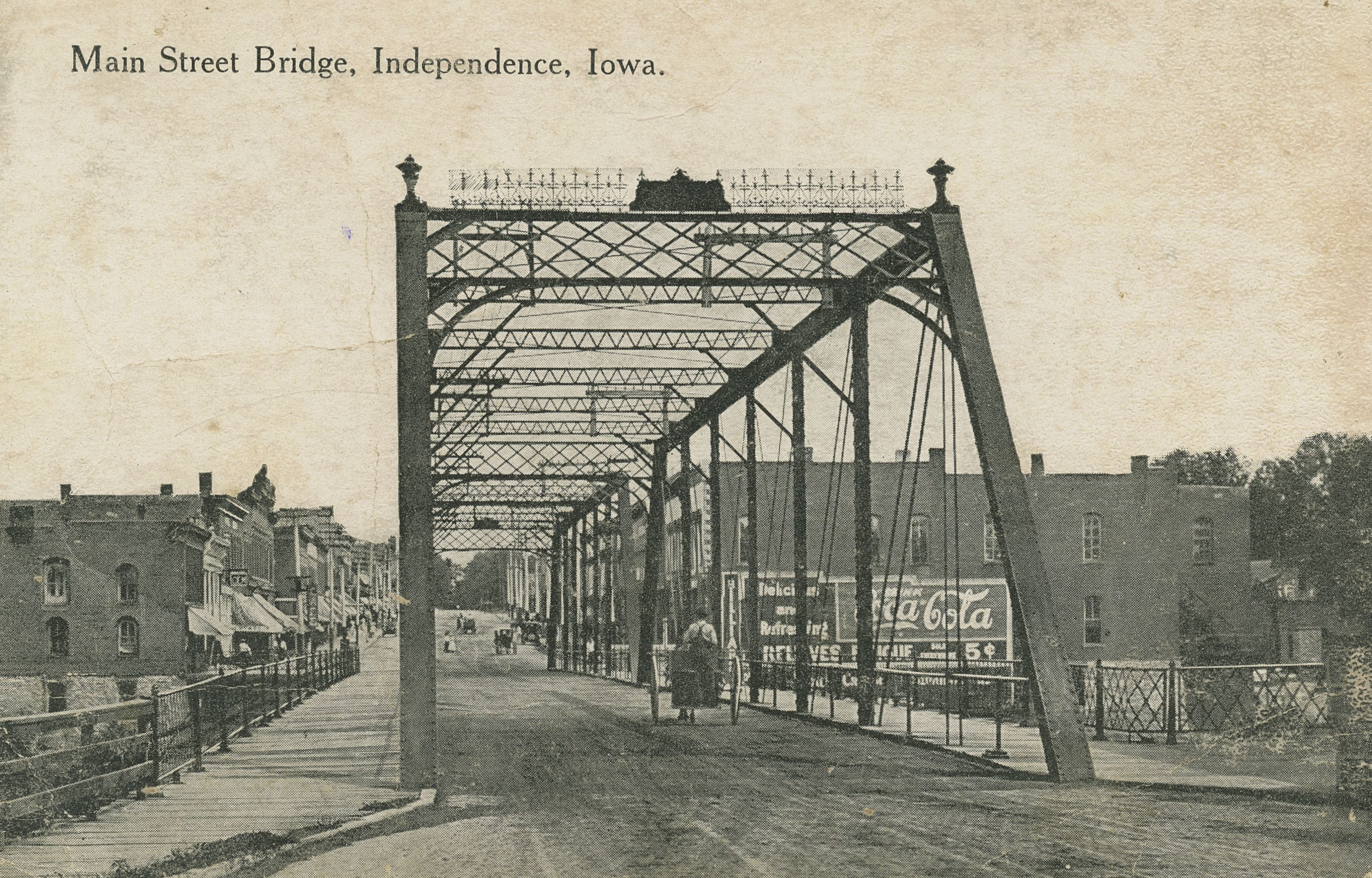
Main Street, 1900

Independence is a city in, and the county seat of, Buchanan County, Iowa, United States. The population was 6,064 at the 2020 census.

== History ==
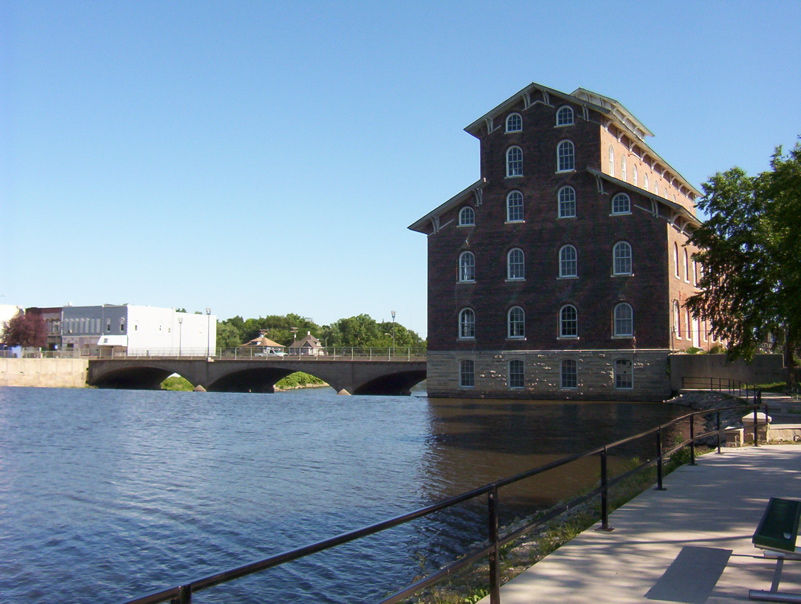
1867 Wapsipinicon Mill

Independence was founded on June 15, 1847 near the center of present-day Buchanan County. The original town plat was a simple nine-block grid on the east side of the Wapsipinicon River. The town was intended as an alternative to Quasqueton (then called Quasequetuk), which was the county seat prior to 1847. The village of Independence had fewer than 15 persons when the county seat was transferred there.

On Main Street, on the west bank of the Wapsipinicon, a six-story grist mill was built in 1867. Some of its foundation stones were taken from that of an earlier mill, the New Haven Mill, built in 1854, that was used for wool processing. (Prior to the incorporation of Independence on October 15, 1864, a short-lived neighboring village, called New Haven, had grown up on the west side of the river, hence the name New Haven Mill.) The 1867 mill, now called the Wapsipinicon Mill, was a source of electrical energy from 1915 to 1940. Some structural restoration occurred in recent years, and the mill now functions partly as an historical museum.

A courthouse was built in 1857, on the east side of the town, on a site described at that time as "the highest tract of land in the neighborhood," where offers "a fine view of the city of Independence, the Valley of the Wapsipinicon, and the surrounding Country". The original courthouse was replaced in 1939 by a Moderne or Art Deco structure.

Among the town's distinctions has been the long-term presence of the Independence State Hospital (formerly called the Iowa State Hospital for the Insane), located on a large, remote tract of land on the west edge of town. The recently restored main building, called the Reynolds Building (made of "native prairie granite" in French Second Empire style), was built in 1873. Today it is open to the public for scheduled tours.

For a few years in the late 1880s and early 1890s, Independence was a nationally known horse-racing center, and was sometimes referred to as the "Lexington of the North". This came about as a result of the meteoric financial success of Charles W. Williams. A telegraph operator and creamery owner from nearby Jesup, Iowa, Williams (with no experience in breeding horses) purchased in 1885 two mares, each of which within a year gave birth to a stallion. These two stallions, which Williams named Axtel and Allerton, went on to set world trotting records, with the result that Williams' earnings enabled him to publish a racing newspaper titled The American Trotter, to build a large three-story hotel and opera house called The Gedney, and to construct a figure-eight shaped race track on the west edge of town, on a large section of land called Rush Park, where he also built a magnificent horse barn, his family mansion, and peripheral structures. The burgeoning community was soon home to other mansions, churches, and even a trolley-car service. Williams went on to raise other record-breaking horses, but he lost much of his fortune in the Panic of 1893. Williams subsequently moved to Galesburg, Illinois, where (among other things) he became acquainted with the young Carl Sandburg (as mentioned in Sandburg's autobiography, Always the Young Strangers). Today, the location of Williams' race track (which was the original site of the Buchanan County Fairgrounds) is a corn field. His house is still standing, but, in recent years, the Rush Park barn was demolished by a bulldozer, to make way for a fastfood drive-in and an auto parts store. In the years that followed the race track days, the town lost most of its importance when the railroad terminal at Independence was pushed further west to Waterloo, Iowa.

Of additional interest are several other buildings of historic and architectural value. Among these are the Christian Seeland House and Brewery at 1010 4th Street Northeast (1873), an Italianate style mansion and brewery; Saint John's Roman Catholic Church at 2nd Street and 4th Avenue Northeast (1911); the Munson Building, formerly the Independence Free Public Library, at 210 2nd Street Northeast (1893–95); Saint James Episcopal Church on 2nd Avenue Northeast, just north of 2nd Street (1863, 1873); and the Depression-era United States Post Office Building at 2nd Street and 2nd Avenue Northeast (1934), not for its architecture, but because hanging inside in the lobby is a WPA mural from the 1930s, titled Postman in the Snow, painted by a former Independence resident named Robert Tabor. About 10 miles east of Independence, south of U.S. Highway 20, near Quasqueton, is the Lowell Walter house or Cedar Rock, a state-owned Frank Lloyd Wright house that is open to the public from May through October.

== Geography ==
According to the United States Census Bureau, the city has a total area of 6.22 square miles (16.11 km^{2}), of which 6.08 square miles (15.75 km^{2}) is land and 0.14 square miles (0.36 km^{2}) is water.

=== Climate ===
According to the Köppen Climate Classification system, Independence has a hot-summer humid continental climate, abbreviated "Dfa" on climate maps. The hottest temperature recorded in Independence was 108 °F (42.2 °C) on July 12–14, 1936, while the coldest temperature recorded was −32 °F (−35.6 °C) on January 12, 1912.

Climate data for Independence, Iowa, 1991–2020 normals, extremes 1883–2009
Month	Jan	Feb	Mar	Apr	May	Jun	Jul	Aug	Sep	Oct	Nov	Dec	Year
Record high °F (°C)	61 (16)	70 (21)	88 (31)	98 (37)	104 (40)	103 (39)	108 (42)	106 (41)	100 (38)	94 (34)	81 (27)	67 (19)	108 (42)
Mean daily maximum °F (°C)	26.5 (−3.1)	30.8 (−0.7)	44.2 (6.8)	59.0 (15.0)	70.8 (21.6)	80.5 (26.9)	83.0 (28.3)	81.4 (27.4)	74.9 (23.8)	61.7 (16.5)	45.9 (7.7)	32.0 (0.0)	57.6 (14.2)
Daily mean °F (°C)	17.3 (−8.2)	21.2 (−6.0)	34.1 (1.2)	47.3 (8.5)	59.3 (15.2)	69.8 (21.0)	72.4 (22.4)	70.4 (21.3)	62.9 (17.2)	50.0 (10.0)	35.7 (2.1)	23.3 (−4.8)	47.0 (8.3)
Mean daily minimum °F (°C)	8.0 (−13.3)	11.7 (−11.3)	23.9 (−4.5)	35.5 (1.9)	47.8 (8.8)	59.2 (15.1)	61.8 (16.6)	59.4 (15.2)	50.9 (10.5)	38.3 (3.5)	25.6 (−3.6)	14.6 (−9.7)	36.4 (2.4)
Record low °F (°C)	−32 (−36)	−31 (−35)	−30 (−34)	−1 (−18)	21 (−6)	35 (2)	40 (4)	34 (1)	18 (−8)	2 (−17)	−19 (−28)	−27 (−33)	−32 (−36)
Average precipitation inches (mm)	0.95 (24)	1.36 (35)	2.02 (51)	3.59 (91)	4.60 (117)	5.66 (144)	4.61 (117)	4.27 (108)	3.53 (90)	3.03 (77)	2.09 (53)	1.66 (42)	37.37 (949)
Average snowfall inches (cm)	10.0 (25)	7.3 (19)	3.8 (9.7)	1.8 (4.6)	0.0 (0.0)	0.0 (0.0)	0.0 (0.0)	0.0 (0.0)	0.0 (0.0)	0.4 (1.0)	3.0 (7.6)	7.6 (19)	33.9 (85.9)
Average precipitation days (≥ 0.01 in)	7.6	7.1	8.1	9.9	12.2	11.0	9.0	8.7	7.6	8.7	7.5	7.9	105.3
Average snowy days (≥ 0.1 in)	5.6	4.5	2.6	1.0	0.0	0.0	0.0	0.0	0.0	0.2	1.7	5.5	21.1
Source: NOAA

== Demographics ==
Historical population
Census	Pop.	Note	%±
1860	1,395		—
1870	2,945		111.1%
1880	3,128		6.2%
1890	3,163		1.1%
1900	3,656		15.6%
1910	3,517		−3.8%
1920	3,672		4.4%
1930	3,691		0.5%
1940	4,342		17.6%
1950	4,865		12.0%
1960	5,498		13.0%
1970	5,910		7.5%
1980	6,392		8.2%
1990	5,972		−6.6%
2000	6,014		0.7%
2010	5,966		−0.8%
2020	6,064		1.6%
2022 (est.)	6,179		1.9%
U.S. Decennial Census; Iowa State Data Center; 2020 Census

=== 2020 census ===
As of the 2020 census, Independence had a population of 6,064, with 2,625 households and 1,541 families residing in the city. The population density was 1,008.6 inhabitants per square mile (389.4/km^{2}). The median age was 40.6 years. 23.6% of residents were under the age of 18 and 20.7% were 65 years of age or older. 25.9% of residents were under the age of 20, 4.5% were between the ages of 20 and 24, 24.3% were from 25 to 44, and 24.6% were from 45 to 64. For every 100 females there were 94.2 males, and for every 100 females age 18 and over there were 89.3 males age 18 and over. The gender makeup of the city was 48.5% male and 51.5% female.

98.9% of residents lived in urban areas, while 1.1% lived in rural areas.

Of the 2,625 households, 27.7% had children under the age of 18 living with them. 44.3% were married-couple households, 7.4% were cohabiting couple households, 29.8% had a female householder with no spouse or partner present, and 18.6% had a male householder with no spouse or partner present. 41.3% of all households were non-families. About 35.3% of all households were made up of individuals, and 17.7% had someone living alone who was 65 years of age or older.

There were 2,834 housing units, with an average density of 471.4 per square mile (182.0/km^{2}), of which 7.4% were vacant. The homeowner vacancy rate was 2.1% and the rental vacancy rate was 8.0%.

Racial composition as of the 2020 census
Race	Number	Percent
White	5,729	94.5%
Black or African American	38	0.6%
American Indian and Alaska Native	11	0.2%
Asian	38	0.6%
Native Hawaiian and Other Pacific Islander	2	0.0%
Some other race	50	0.8%
Two or more races	196	3.2%
Hispanic or Latino (of any race)	138	2.3%

=== 2010 census ===
As of the census of 2010, there were 5,966 people, 2,521 households and 1,566 families residing in the city. The population density was 981.3 inhabitants per square mile (378.9/km^{2}). There were 2,745 housing units at an average density of 451.5 per square mile (174.3/km^{2}). The racial makeup of the city was 97.6% White, 0.3% African American, 0.1% Native American, 0.7% Asian, 0.2% from other races, and 1.1% from two or more races. Hispanic or Latino of any race were 1.2%.

Of the 2,521 households 29.0% had children under the age of 18 living with them, 48.7% were married couples living together, 9.9% had a female householder with no husband present, 3.5% had a male householder with no wife present, and 37.9% were non-families. 32.2% of households were one person and 15.4% were one person aged 65 or older. The average household size was 2.30 and the average family size was 2.92.

The median age was 41 years. 23.9% of residents were under the age of 18; 7.7% were between the ages of 18 and 24; 23.2% were from 25 to 44; 25.7% were from 45 to 64; and 19.7% were 65 or older. The gender makeup of the city was 46.8% male and 53.2% female.

=== 2000 census ===
As of the census of 2000, there were 6,014 people, 2,432 households, and 1,588 families residing in the city. The population density was 1,621.8 inhabitants per square mile (626.2/km^{2}). There were 2,610 housing units at an average density of 703.9 per square mile (271.8/km^{2}). The racial makeup of the city was 97.97% White, 0.28% African American, 0.05% Native American, 0.76% Asian, 0.22% from other races, and 0.71% from two or more races. Hispanic or Latino of any race were 0.50%.

Of the 2,432 households 30.0% had children under the age of 18 living with them, 52.9% were married couples living together, 9.4% had a female householder with no husband present, and 34.7% were non-families. 30.3% of households were one person and 16.0% were one person aged 65 or older. The average household size was 2.35 and the average family size was 2.93.

Age spread: 25.4% under the age of 18, 7.3% from 18 to 24, 25.9% from 25 to 44, 22.5% from 45 to 64, and 18.9% 65 or older. The median age was 39 years. For every 100 females, there were 88.6 males. For every 100 females age 18 and over, there were 82.8 males.

The median household income was $36,554 and the median family income was $45,951. Males had a median income of $31,161 versus $21,597 for females. The per capita income for the city was $20,683. About 5.0% of families and 7.0% of the population were below the poverty line, including 8.5% of those under age 18 and 7.0% of those age 65 or over.

== Arts and culture ==
=== Points of interest ===
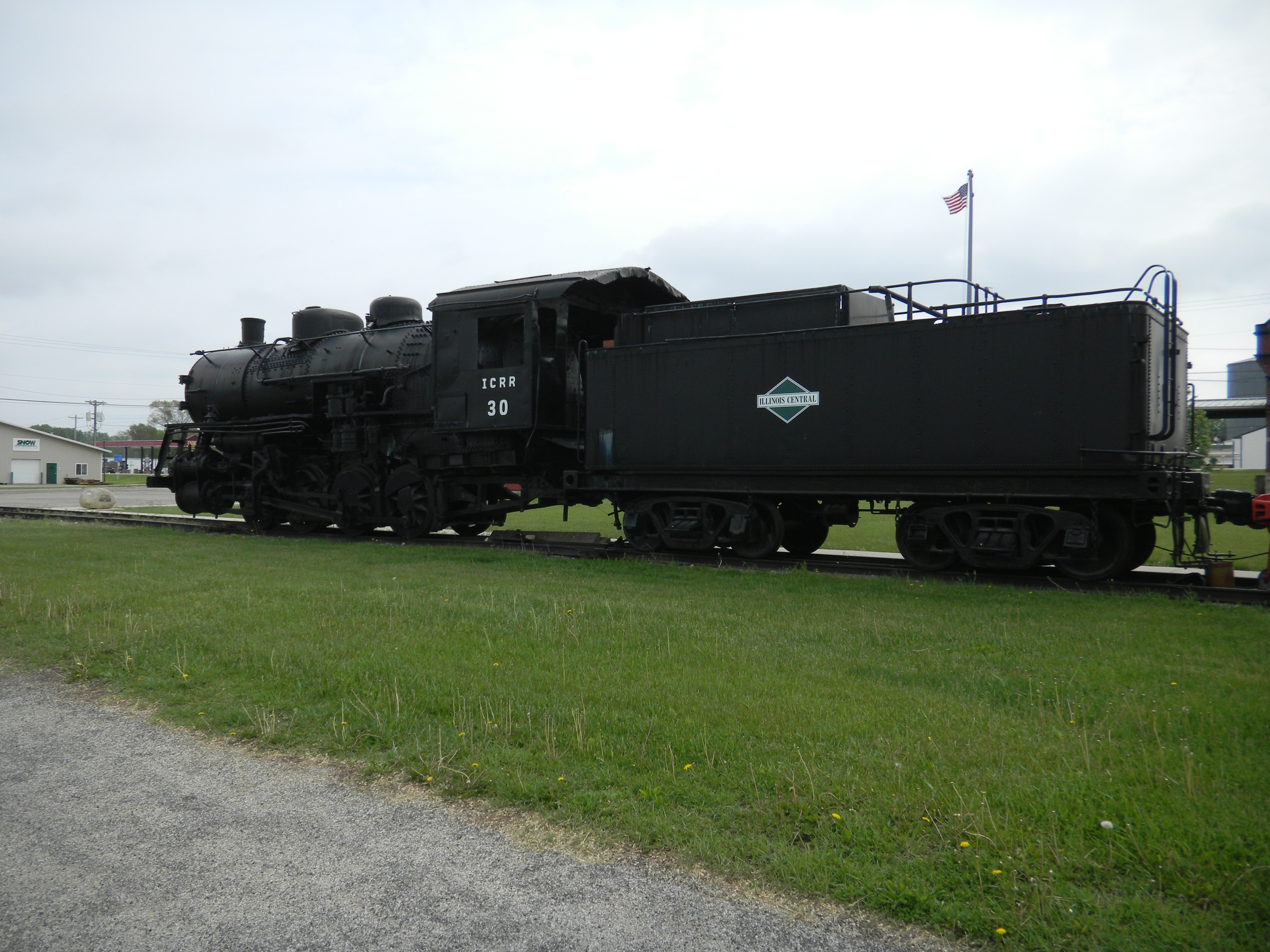
Illinois Central #30, a 0-8-0 steam locomotive on display in Independence

- River'sEDGE Sport & Fitness (2014)
- Historic Downtown
- Beautiful Riverside Parks
- Independence Family Aquatic Center (2017)
- Wapsipinicon Mill
- Independence State Hospital, a historic mental hospital located on the outskirts of the city.
- Heartland Acres Agribition Center, an agricultural history museum.
- Independence Motor Speedway
- Independence Public Library
- Malek Theatre
- Illinois Central Station

== Education ==
Independence belongs to the Independence Community School District, which also includes the towns of Brandon and Rowley. The district includes a Preschool ages 4–5 grade building (Early Childhood Center), K - 2nd grade school (East Elementary), a 3rd - 6th grade school (West Elementary) and a junior senior high school (7th-12th grade). The area is also served by St. John Catholic School. In 2011, the communities of Brandon, Rowley and Independence passed a bond referendum to build a new $27,500,000 junior and senior high school that opened in the fall of 2013.

== Infrastructure ==
=== Airport ===
The FAA identifier is IIB, and this is a small municipal airport offering flight training, quick-service fueling, charter flights, aircraft maintenance, and hangar rental.

== Notable people ==
- Harry Chase, 19th Century American marine artist
- William Edwards Cook, American expatriate artist
- Janet Dailey, novelist
- Leonard Eugene Dickson, prominent mathematician
- William G. Donnan, member of the Iowa Senate and United States House of Representatives
- Bill Gustoff, member of the Iowa House of Representatives
- Ulysses Prentiss Hedrick, botanist and horticulturist who specialized in spermatophytes
- Murray Joslin, electrical engineer who made major contributions to nuclear power
- William A. Noyes, analytical and organic chemist
- Robert Byron Tabor, painter
- Harry E. Yarnell, U.S. Navy admiral
