= Iowa's 2nd Senate district =

American legislative district

Iowa's 2nd State Senate district
Senator
Jeff Taylor; R

The 2nd district of the Iowa Senate, located in Northwestern Iowa, is currently composed of Plymouth and Sioux counties. Its current member of the Iowa Senate is Republican Jeff Taylor.

== Current elected officials ==
Jeff Taylor is the senator currently representing the 2nd District.

The area of the 2nd District contains two Iowa House of Representatives districts:

- The 3rd District (represented by Dennis Bush)
- The 4th District (represented by Skyler Wheeler)

The district is also located in Iowa's 4th congressional district, which is represented by U.S. Representative Randy Feenstra.

== List of representatives ==
Representative	Party	Dates	Residence	Notes
John Fletcher Sanford	Whig	1846–1849	Van Buren County	
John McCormick Whitaker	Democratic	1846–1847		
George Grover Wright	Whig	1848–1851	Van Buren County	
John Brice Spees	Whig	1850–1851	Birmingham	
Milton D. Browning	Whig	1852–1855	Burlington	
George Hepner	Democratic	1852–1853		
William Findlay Coolbaugh	Democratic	1854–1855	Burlington	
David T. Brigham	Democratic	1856–1859	Keokuk	
Gideon S. Bailey	Democratic	1860–1861	Vernon	
Abner McCrary	Republican	1862–1865		
Eliab Doud	Republican	1866–1869	Village Township	
Jacob Vale	Republican	1870–1873		
James B. Pease	Anti-Monopoly	1874–1875		
James B. Pease	Democratic	1876–1877		
Horatio Wonn	Democratic	1878–1879		
Henry Traverse	Republican	1880–1881	Bloomfield	
Alexander Brown	Republican	1882–1883	Keosauqua	
John Carr	Democratic	1884–1887	Milton	
Benjamin R. Vale	Republican	1888–1895	Bonaparte	
Thomas Bell	Republican	1896–1899	Fairfield	
Henry Brighton	Republican	1900–1903	Fairfield	
James Elercik	Republican	1904–1908	Douds	
William S. Allen	Republican	1909–1912	Fairfield	
John Taylor	Republican	1913–1916	Farmington	
George Ball	Republican	1917–1920	Fairfield	Died in office in 1920.
Charles Fulton	Republican	1921–1928	Fairfield	
Aaron V. Blackford	Republican	1929–1932	Bonaparte	
John N. Calhoun	Republican	1933–1936	Keosauque	
Sanford Zeigler	Republican	1937–1944		The Iowa Legislative historian suggests that the 1943–1944 50th General Assembly was finished out by Charles W. Wade.
Alden Doud	Republican	1945–1952	Douds	
Charles Nelson	Republican	1953–1956	Packwood	
Norval Evans	Republican	1957–1960	Fairfield	
Dewey Phelps	Republican	1961–1964		
Max E. Reno	Republican	1965–1969	Van Buren County	
Charles G. Mogged	Republican	1969–1971	Fairfield	
Marvin W. Smith	Republican	1971–1972	O'Brien County	
Irvin Bergman	Republican	1973–1981	Osceola County	
Richard Vande Hoef	Republican	1981–1983	Ocheyedan	
Donald Doyle	Democratic	1983–1993	Sioux City	
Bradly Banks	Republican	1993–1997		
John Redwine	Republican	1997–2003	Sioux City	
Kenneth Veenstra	Republican	2003–2005	Orange City	
Dave Mulder	Republican	2005–2009	Sioux Center	
Randy Feenstra	Republican	2009–2021	Hull	
Jeff Taylor	Republican	2021–present	Sioux Center	

== Recent election results from statewide races ==
Year	Office	Results
2008	President	McCain 73–25%
2012	President	Romney 79–21%
2016	President	Trump 79–16%
2016	Senate	Grassley 86–12%
2018	Governor	Reynolds 82–17%
2018	Attorney General	Miller 69–31%
2018	Secretary of State	Pate 82–17%
2018	Treasurer	Davis 77–22%
2018	Auditor	Mosiman 77–21%
2020	President	Trump 80–18%
2020	Senate	Ernst 80–18%
2022	Senate	Grassley 85–15%
2022	Governor	Reynolds 88–11%
2022	Attorney General	Bird 82–18%
2022	Secretary of State	Pate 87–13%
2022	Treasurer	Smith 82–18%
2022	Auditor	Halbur 80–20%
2024	President	Trump 82–17%

== Historical district boundaries ==
Map	Description	Years effective	Notes
	Van Buren County	1846–1851	From 1846 to 1857, district numbering was not utilized by the Iowa State Legislature. This convention was added with the passing of the 1857 Iowa Constitution. Numbering of districts pre-1857 is done as a matter of historic convenience.
	Des Moines County	1852–1855	
	Van Buren County (part) Lee County (part)	1856–1859	
	Van Buren County	1860–1877	
	Van Buren County Davis County	1878–1887	
	Van Buren County Jefferson County	1888–1962	
	Van Buren County Appanoose County Davis County	1963–1966	
	Van Buren County Jefferson County Davis County	1967–1970	
	Clay County (part) Dickinson County Lyon County (part) O'Brien County (part) Osceola County	1971–1972	In 1970, the Iowa Legislature passed an amendment to the Iowa Constitution setting forth the rules for legislative redistricting in order to abide by the rules established by the Reynolds v. Sims Supreme Court case. The first reapportionment map created by the Republican controlled legislature was deemed unconstitutional, but was still used for the 1970 election.
	Clay County (part) Dickinson County; Emmet County (part); Lyon County (part); O'Brien County (part); Osceola County; Palo Alto County (part); Sioux County (part)	1973–1982	
	Ida County (part); Monona County Woodbury County (part)	1983–1992	
	Plymouth County (part) Woodbury County (part)	1993–2002	
	Lyon County Plymouth County (part): Excluding; Elkhorn Township; Fredonia Township; Garfield Township; Henry Township; Hungerford Township; Lincoln Township; Marion Township; Meadow Township; Remsen Township; Union Township; Sioux County (part): Excluding; East Orange Township; Floyd Township; Grant Township; Lynn Township	2003–2012	
	Cherokee County O'Brien County; Plymouth County (part): Garfield Township; Henry Township; Meadow Township; Remsen Township; Sioux County	2013–2022	
	Lyon County Plymouth County (part): America Township; Elgin Township; Fredonia Township; Grant Township; Johnson Township; Meadow Township; Portland Township; Preston Township; Sioux Township; Washington Township; Westfield Township; Sioux County	2023–present	

== See also ==
- Iowa General Assembly
- Iowa Senate
