= Iowa's 7th Senate district =

American legislative district

Iowa's 7th State Senate district
Senator
Kevin Alons; R

The 7th district of the Iowa Senate is located in Western Iowa; it is currently composed Monona County, and of parts of Cherokee, Plymouth, and Woodbury counties. Its current member of the Iowa Senate is Republican Kevin Alons.

== Current elected officials ==
Kevin Alons is the senator currently representing the 7th District.

The area of the 7th District contains two Iowa House of Representatives districts:

- The 13th District (represented by Ken Carlson)
- The 14th District (represented by Jacob Bossman)

The district is also located in Iowa's 4th congressional district, which is represented by U.S. Representative Randy Feenstra.

== List of representatives ==
Representative	Party	Dates	Residence	Notes
Evan Jay	Whig	1846-1849	Henry County	
John Tillison Morton	Whig	1850-1851	Mount Pleasant, Iowa	
Henry Hendershott	Democrat	1852-1853	Ottumwa, Iowa	
Daniel Anderson	Whig	1854-1855	Monroe County	
Alvin Saunders	Republican	1856-1859	Mount Pleasant, Iowa	
Harvey English	Democrat	1860-1863	Fremont County	
Lewis Hillyer	Republican	1864-1867	Taylor County	
Isaac Keller	Republican	1868-1871	Mount Ayr, Iowa	
Elisha Smith	Republican	1872-1875	Taylor County	
Frederick Joseph Teale	Republican	1876-1877	Decatur City, Iowa	
Philip Lewellen	Republican	1878-1881	Clarinda, Iowa	
Talton Clark	Republican	1882-1889	Clarinda, Iowa	
George Perkins	Republican	1890-1893	Fremont County	
William Eaton	Republican	1894-1901	Sidney, Iowa	
Lester Lewis	Republican	1902-1906	Clarinda, Iowa	
William Jamieson	Democrat	1907-1909	Page County	Jamieson was elected to the US House of Representatives in 1908.
John Dunnegan	Democrat	1911-1914	Shenandoah, Iowa	
Herbert Foskett	Republican	1915-1922	Shenandoah, Iowa	
Sylvester Rees	Republican	1923-1926	Fremont County	
Denver Wilson	Republican	1927-1930	Shenandoah, Iowa	
Frank Coykendall	Republican	1931-1932	Shenandoah, Iowa	
Frank Coykendall	Democrat	1933-1934	Shenandoah, Iowa	
Paul Millhone	Republican	1935-1938	Clarinda, Iowa	
Carl Sjulin	Republican	1939-1946	Hamburg, Iowa	
Earl Fishbaugh	Republican	1947-1954	Shenandoah, Iowa	
Frank Hoxie	Republican	1955-1962	Shenandoah, Iowa	
Robert Dodds	Democrat	1963-1970	Des Moines County	
Floyd Gilley	Republican	1971-1972	Maynard, Iowa	
Ralph McCartney	Republican	1973-1974	Charles City, Iowa	
Milo Merrit	Democrat	1975-1978	Osage, Iowa	
Arthur Gratias	Republican	1979-1982	Floyd County	
C. Joseph Coleman	Democrat	1983-1990	Clare, Iowa	
James Kersten	Republican	1991-1994	Webster County	
Rod Halvorson	Democrat	1995-1998	Webster County	
Mike Sexton	Republican	1999-2002	Calhoun County	
Amanda Ragan	Democrat	2003-2012	Mason City, Iowa	
Rick Bertrand	Republican	2013-2018	Sioux City, Iowa	
Jackie Smith	Democrat	2019-2022	Sioux City, Iowa	
Kevin Alons	Republican	2023-Present	Woodbury County	

== Historical district boundaries ==
Map	Description	Years effective	Notes
	Henry County	1846-1851	From 1846 to 1857, district numbering was not utilized by the Iowa State Legislature. This convention was added with the passing of the 1857 Iowa Constitution. Numbering of districts pre-1857 is done as a matter of historic convenience.
	Clarke County Lucas County; Monroe County; Wapello County (partial)	1852-1855	
	Henry County	1856-1859	
	Fremont County Mills County; Montgomery County; Page County	1860-1861	
	Fremont County Mills County; Pottawattamie County	1862-1863	
	Adams County Montgomery County; Page County; Ringgold County; Taylor County; Union County	1864-1865	
	Adams County Montgomery County; Page County; Taylor County; Union County	1866-1867	
	Decatur County Ringgold County	1868-1869	
	Decatur County Ringgold County; Taylor County	1870-1877	
	Fremont County Page County	1878-1962	
	Fremont County Mills County; Page County	1963-1970	
	Allamakee County (partial) Fayette County; Winneshiek County (partial)	1970-1971	In 1970, the Iowa Legislature passed an amendment to the Iowa Constitution setting forth the rules for legislative redistricting in order to abide by the rules established by the Reynolds v. Sims Supreme Court case. The first reapportionment map created by the Republican controlled legislature was deemed unconstitutional, but was still used for the 1970 election.
	Cerro Gordo County (partial) Chickasaw County (partial); Floyd County (partial); Howard County (partial); Mitchell County	1973-1982	
	Boone County Carroll County (partial); Greene County; Hamilton County (partial); Story County (partial); Webster County (partial)	1983-1992	
	Boone County (partial) Calhoun County; Hamilton County (partial); Webster County	1993-2002	
	Cerro Gordo County (partial): Mason Township; Owen Township; Portland Township; Mason City; Floyd County; Mitchell County	2003-2012	
	Woodbury County (partial): Concord Township; Sioux City Approximately North of US Highway 20	2013-2022	
	Cherokee County (partial): Amherst Township; Grand Meadow Township; Marcus Township; Rock Township; Sheridan Township; Tilden Township; Willow Township; Cleghorn; Marcus; Meriden; Quimby; Washta; Monona County; Plymouth County (partial): Elkhorn Township; Garfield Township; Hancock Township; Henry Township; Hungerford Township; Liberty Township; Lincoln Township; Marion Township; Perry Township; Plymouth Township; Remsen Township; Stanton Township; Union Township; Hinton; Kingsley; Merrill; Oyens; Remsen; Woodbury County (partial): Excluding; Banner Township; Concord Township; Sioux City approximately north of US Highway 20		

== See also ==
- Iowa General Assembly
- Iowa Senate
