= National Register of Historic Places listings in Plymouth County, Iowa =

Location of Plymouth County in Iowa

This is intended to be a complete list of the properties and districts on the National Register of Historic Places in Plymouth County, Iowa, United States. Latitude and longitude coordinates are provided for many National Register properties and districts; these locations may be seen together in a map.

There are 11 properties and districts listed on the National Register in the county, including 1 National Historic Landmark.

This National Park Service list is complete through NPS recent listings posted May 9, 2025.

	Name on the Register	Image	Date listed	Location	City or town	Description
1	Akron Opera House	Akron Opera House	July 10, 2012 (#12000403)	151 Reed St. 42°49′44″N 96°33′36″W	Akron	
2	Foster Park Historic District		April 25, 2008 (#08000329)	500-900 blocks of Central Ave., S. and blocks around Foster Park; 42°47′01″N 96°09′59″W	Le Mars	
3	Kimball Village	Kimball Village	June 11, 2010 (#10000343)	Address Restricted	Westfield	Designated a National Historic Landmark on January 11, 2017
4	Le Mars Central High School	Le Mars Central High School	May 14, 1999 (#99000492)	335 1st Ave., SW. 42°47′19″N 96°10′05″W	Le Mars	
5	Le Mars Downtown Commercial Historic District	Le Mars Downtown Commercial Historic District	November 6, 2012 (#12000908)	Bounded by 2nd St., N., 2nd Ave., W., 1st St., S., and 1st Ave., E. 42°47′37″N 96°10′02″W	Le Mars	
6	Le Mars Municipal Park and Golf Course Historic District	Le Mars Municipal Park and Golf Course Historic District	August 8, 2001 (#01000858)	Between 4th Ave., NE. and Iowa Highway 3; 42°48′10″N 96°09′03″W	Le Mars	
7	Le Mars Public Library	Le Mars Public Library	March 26, 1979 (#79000922)	200 Central; 42°47′25″N 96°09′56″W	Le Mars	
8	Plymouth County Courthouse	Plymouth County Courthouse	July 2, 1981 (#81000263)	E. 3rd Ave. 42°47′23″N 96°09′40″W	Le Mars	
9	Sacred Heart Hospital	Sacred Heart Hospital	February 3, 2010 (#09001303)	4110 6th Ave., NE. 42°47′41″N 96°09′27″W	Le Mars	
10	St. George's Episcopal Church		November 21, 1976 (#76000797)	400 1st Ave., SE. 42°47′16″N 96°09′52″W	Le Mars	
11	Tonsfeldt Round Barn	Tonsfeldt Round Barn	November 19, 1986 (#86003194)	Plymouth County Fairgrounds; 42°47′52″N 96°09′34″W	Le Mars	

== Former listing ==
	Name on the Register	Image	Date listed	Date removed	Location	City or town	Description
1	Thoren Hall	Thoren Hall	May 22, 1978 (#78001248)	May 22, 1998	Westmar College campus, 10th St.	Le Mars	Demolished November 11, 1990
2	Reeves Farmstead Historic District	Reeves Farmstead Historic District	January 26, 2001 (#00001680)	December 2, 2020	Lake St. 42°48′49″N 96°11′37″W	Le Mars	

== See also ==
- List of National Historic Landmarks in Iowa
- National Register of Historic Places listings in Iowa
- Listings in neighboring counties: Cherokee, Sioux, Union (SD), Woodbury
