= Adaville, Iowa =

- unincorporated community
- Location within Iowa
- Coordinates: 42.7508257°N 96.4044726°W
- Country: United States
- State: Iowa
- Elevation: 1,309 ft (399 m)
- Time zone: UTC-6 (Central (CST))
  - Summer (DST): UTC-5 (CDT)
- GNIS feature ID: 464438

Adaville is an unincorporated community in Plymouth County, in the U.S. state of Iowa.

== Geography ==
Adaville lies near the junction of County Road C38 and Fir Avenue (an unpaved gravel road), in sections 28 and 33 of Johnson Township. It lies 14 miles (23 km) from LeMars the county seat. Adaville lies in the southern part of the township, with nearby Ruble, Iowa, in the northern part of the township.

== History ==
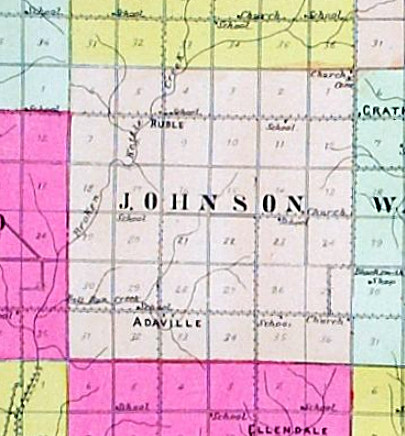
Johnson Township, Plymouth County, Iowa showing the locations of Ruble and Adaville

The first post office in Adaville opened sometime prior to 1857, and was discontinued in May 1857. The Adaville United Methodist Church was founded in 1871.

The Adaville store opened on May 1, 1892, with the O.R. Gaston family the original owners. The store sold general merchandise, including farm equipment. Adaville also had a school during this period, and O.R. Gaston taught the school while Ella Morehead Gaston ran the store.

Adaville's second post office opened in 1889.

The community's population was 6 in 1900. The Adaville post office closed for the second time in 1904. The Adaville High School operated during this period.

Adaville's population was 18 in 1920.

The Adaville store remained open, under various owners, until closing during the Great Depression. By the 1930s, Adaville was listed in The Annals of Iowa, an influential history periodical, as an abandoned town.

By 1940, Adaville's population was 10. The Adaville store reopened in 1946, and closed again in 1956. The property was sold in 1958, and the building was razed in the early 1960s.

The community still appears on county highway maps, with the Adaville Church being the most visible building. The church celebrated its centenary in 1971.

== See also ==
- James, Iowa
