= Municipal Park =

Municipal Park can refer to:

- Urban park, a park in the city

== Notable parks ==
=== Luxembourg ===
- Édouard André Municipal Park, in Luxembourg City
- Municipal Park, in Diekirch

=== United States ===
- Kristin Armstrong Municipal Park, in Boise, Idaho
- Langan (Municipal) Park, in Mobile, Alabama
- Le Mars Municipal Park and Golf Course Historic District, in Le Mars, Iowa
- Northampton Municipal Park, in Bucks County, Pennsylvania

== See also ==
- Municipal Stadium (disambiguation)
