= Merrill High School =

Merrill High School may refer to:

- Merrill High School (Arkansas) in Pine Bluff, Arkansas
- Merrill High School (Michigan) in Merrill, Michigan
- Merrill High School (Oregon) in Merrill, Oregon
- Merrill High School (Wisconsin) in Merrill, Wisconsin
- Merrill Junior High School in Merrill, Iowa
