= LRJ =

LRJ can refer to:

- Laksar Junction railway station, a railway station in Uttarakhand, India.
- Le Mars Municipal Airport, an airport in Iowa, United States.
- Lincombian-Ranisian-Jerzmanowician, a Paleolithic European stone tool culture of early modern humans
- LeBron Raymone James, American NBA player, better known as King James.
