= Jeff Taylor (politician) =

American political scientist and politician (born 1961)

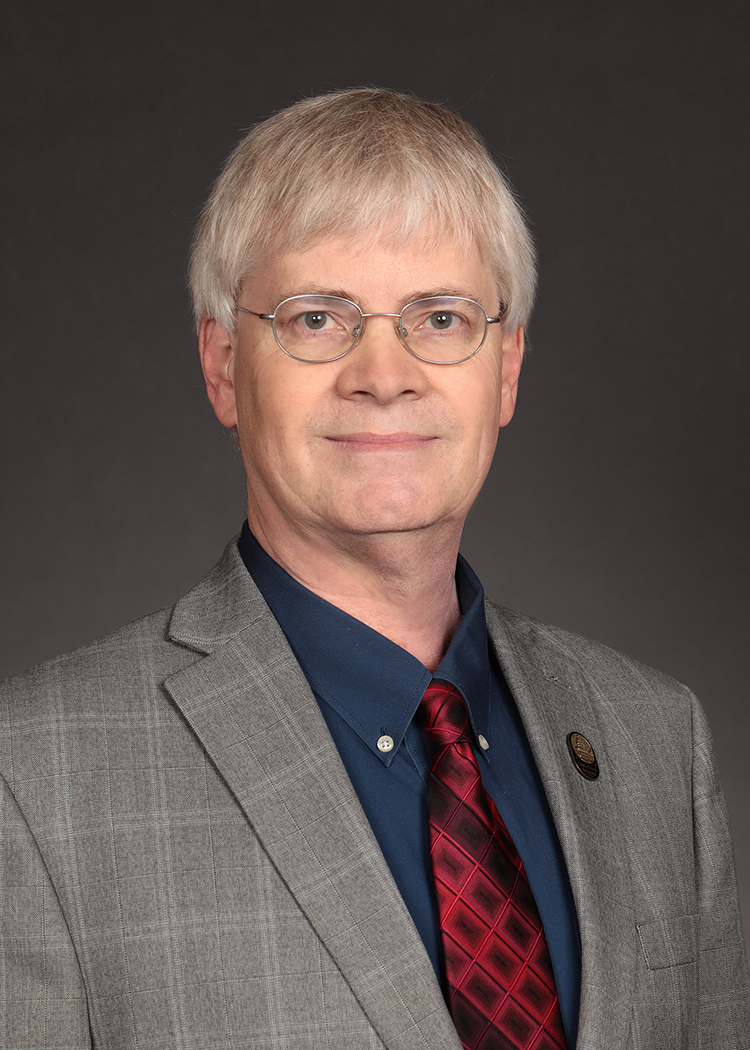

Member of the Iowa Senate from the 2nd district
- Incumbent
- Assumed office January 11, 2021
- Preceded by: Randy Feenstra

Personal details
- Born: January 30, 1961 (age 65) Spencer, Iowa, U.S.
- Party: Republican
- Education: Northwestern College (BA); University of Iowa (MA); University of Missouri (MA, PhD)
- Occupation: Professor

Jeffrey Taylor (born January 30, 1961) is an American political scientist, politician, and a Republican Party member of the Iowa Senate from District 2 since January 11, 2021.

== Early life and career ==
Taylor is from Spencer, Iowa. He attended Northwestern College before completing a master's degree from the University of Iowa and a master's and doctorate from the University of Missouri. As a scholar, he was an early exponent of the horseshoe theory of political ideology. Taylor taught at Dordt University for eight years prior to running for public office in 2020. Taylor was also a political analyst for KCAU-TV.

== Political career ==
In 2012, Taylor served as a delegate to the Republican National Convention from Iowa.

In October 2019, Taylor announced that he would be seeking election to the Iowa Senate, as incumbent Randy Feenstra vacated the seat to run for the United States House of Representatives. Taylor's candidacy in the Republican Party primary was certified in February 2020. Taylor reported that more than 250 signatures were submitted in his petition for ballot access. He was unopposed in the primary and general elections. In July 2023, Taylor announced that he would be seeking reelection. Once again, he was unopposed in the primary and general elections in 2024.

== Published works ==
- Taylor, Jeff (2006). Where Did the Party Go? William Jennings Bryan, Hubert Humphrey, and the Jeffersonian Legacy. University of Missouri Press. ISBN 9780826216618.
- Taylor, Jeff (2013). Politics on a Human Scale: The American Tradition of Decentralism. Lexington Books. ISBN 9780739186749.
- Taylor, Jeff; Israelson, Chad (2015). The Political World of Bob Dylan: Freedom and Justice, Power and Sin. Palgrave Macmillan. ISBN 9781137482341.
