= William G. Kirchner =

American politician (1916–1999)

William George "Bill" Kirchner (December 12, 1916 – March 2, 1999) was an American businessman and politician.

Kirchner was born in Plymouth County, Iowa and went to the public schools in Marcus, Iowa. He received his bachelor's degree from Morningside University in 1938 and his master's degree in business administration from Harvard Business School. Kirchner moved to Richfield, Minnesota in 1940 and was involved with the banking business. He served in the United States Navy during World War II. Kirchner served in the Minnesota House of Representatives from 1963 to 1966 and in the Minnesota Senate from 1967 to 1980. He was a Republican. He died in Edina, Minnesota.
