= Craig, Iowa =

- City
- Location of Craig, Iowa
- Coordinates: 42°53′44″N 96°18′34″W
- Country: USA
- State: Iowa
- County: Plymouth

Area
  - Total: 0.089 sq mi (0.23 km^{2})
  - Land: 0.089 sq mi (0.23 km^{2})
  - Water: 0 sq mi (0.00 km^{2})
- Elevation: 1,394 ft (425 m)

Population (2020)
  - Total: 79
  - Density: 901.7/sq mi (348.15/km^{2})
- Time zone: UTC-6 (Central (CST))
  - Summer (DST): UTC-5 (CDT)
- ZIP code: 51031
- Area code: 712
- FIPS code: 19-16950
- GNIS feature ID: 2393660

Craig is a city in Plymouth County, Iowa, United States. The population was 79 at the 2020 census.

The town of Craig was incorporated in Plymouth County on April 26, 1911.

== Geography ==
According to the United States Census Bureau, the city has a total area of 0.09 square miles (0.23 km^{2}), all land.

== Demographics ==
Historical populations
Year	Pop.	±%
1920	156	—
1930	155	−0.6%
1940	165	+6.5%
1950	142	−13.9%
1960	117	−17.6%
1970	98	−16.2%
1980	105	+7.1%
1990	116	+10.5%
2000	102	−12.1%
2010	89	−12.7%
2020	79	−11.2%
Source:"U.S. Census website". United States Census Bureau. and Iowa Data Center; Source: U.S. Decennial Census

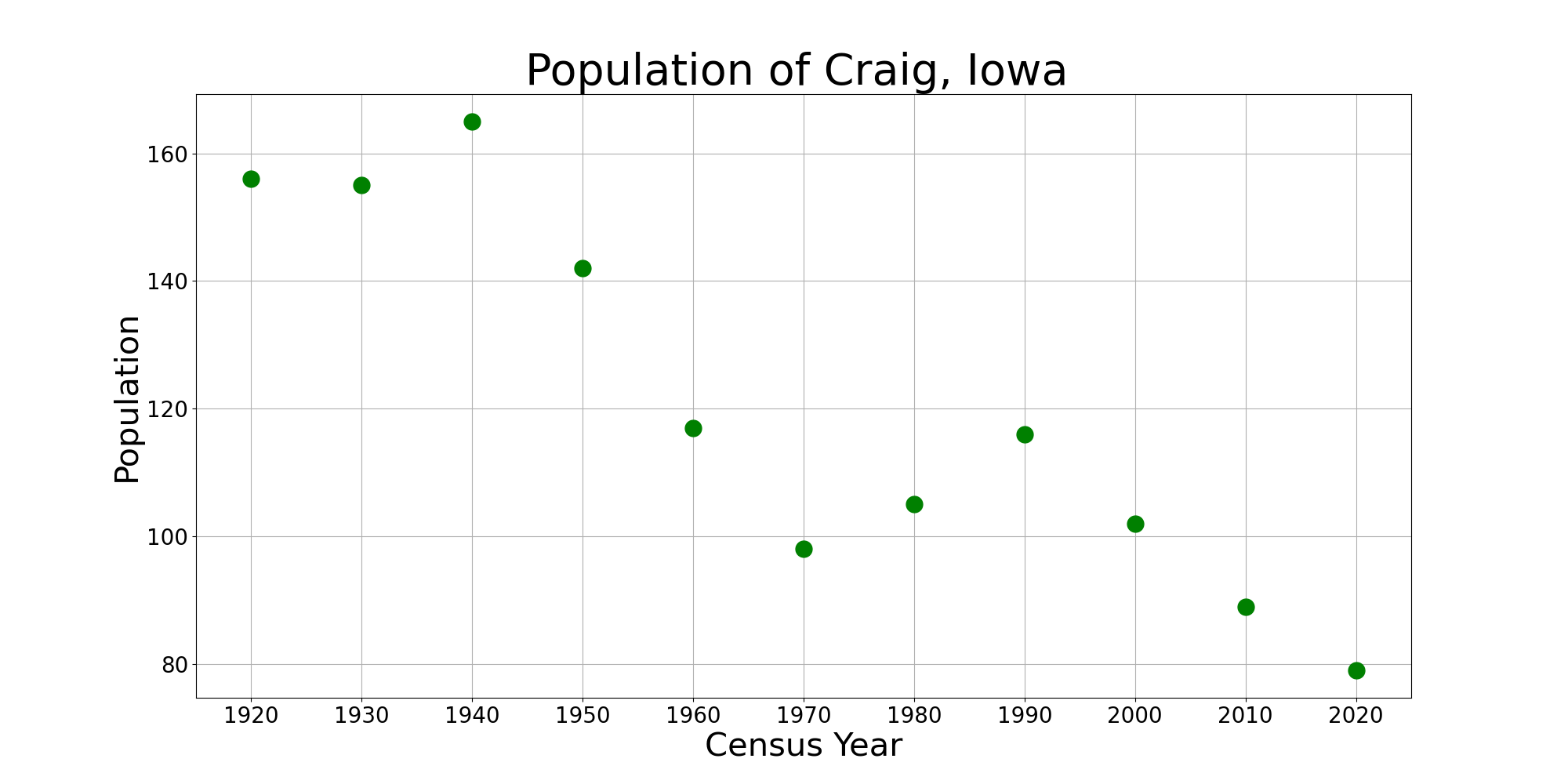
The population of Craig, Iowa from US census data

=== 2020 census ===
As of the census of 2020, there were 79 people, 40 households, and 26 families residing in the city. The population density was 901.7 inhabitants per square mile (348.2/km^{2}). There were 40 housing units at an average density of 456.6 per square mile (176.3/km^{2}). The racial makeup of the city was 87.3% White, 0.0% Black or African American, 0.0% Native American, 0.0% Asian, 0.0% Pacific Islander, 3.8% from other races and 8.9% from two or more races. Hispanic or Latino persons of any race comprised 5.1% of the population.

Of the 40 households, 40.0% of which had children under the age of 18 living with them, 37.5% were married couples living together, 15.0% were cohabitating couples, 25.0% had a female householder with no spouse or partner present and 22.5% had a male householder with no spouse or partner present. 35.0% of all households were non-families. 25.0% of all households were made up of individuals, 10.0% had someone living alone who was 65 years old or older.

The median age in the city was 43.3 years. 29.1% of the residents were under the age of 20; 2.5% were between the ages of 20 and 24; 20.3% were from 25 and 44; 31.6% were from 45 and 64; and 16.5% were 65 years of age or older. The gender makeup of the city was 51.9% male and 48.1% female.

=== 2010 census ===
As of the census of 2010, there were 89 people, 37 households, and 26 families living in the city. The population density was 988.9 inhabitants per square mile (381.8/km^{2}). There were 45 housing units at an average density of 500.0 per square mile (193.1/km^{2}). The racial makeup of the city was 100.0% White.

There were 37 households, of which 32.4% had children under the age of 18 living with them, 56.8% were married couples living together, 8.1% had a female householder with no husband present, 5.4% had a male householder with no wife present, and 29.7% were non-families. 29.7% of all households were made up of individuals, and 10.8% had someone living alone who was 65 years of age or older. The average household size was 2.41 and the average family size was 2.85.

The median age in the city was 41.2 years. 23.6% of residents were under the age of 18; 9% were between the ages of 18 and 24; 25.8% were from 25 to 44; 30.3% were from 45 to 64; and 11.2% were 65 years of age or older. The gender makeup of the city was 52.8% male and 47.2% female.

=== 2000 census ===
As of the census of 2000, there were 102 people, 43 households, and 28 families living in the city. The population density was 1,086.8 inhabitants per square mile (419.6/km^{2}). There were 46 housing units at an average density of 490.1 per square mile (189.2/km^{2}). The racial makeup of the city was 100.00% White.

There were 43 households, out of which 30.2% had children under the age of 18 living with them, 62.8% were married couples living together, 4.7% had a female householder with no husband present, and 32.6% were non-families. 30.2% of all households were made up of individuals, and 11.6% had someone living alone who was 65 years of age or older. The average household size was 2.37 and the average family size was 3.00.

In the city, the population was spread out, with 21.6% under the age of 18, 5.9% from 18 to 24, 32.4% from 25 to 44, 23.5% from 45 to 64, and 16.7% who were 65 years of age or older. The median age was 40 years. For every 100 females, there were 117.0 males. For every 100 females age 18 and over, there were 116.2 males.

The median income for a household in the city was $32,917, and the median income for a family was $42,500. Males had a median income of $30,208 versus $24,375 for females. The per capita income for the city was $17,239. None of the population and none of the families were below the poverty line.

== Education ==
The Le Mars Community School District operates local area public schools.
