= Le Mars Community School District =

Public school district in Le Mars, Iowa, United States

Coordinates: 42.781584°N 96.172420°W

Location
- Le Mars, Iowa Plymouth County United States
- Coordinates: 42.781584, -96.172420

District information
- Type: Local school district
- Grades: K-12
- Superintendent: Dr. Steven Webner
- Schools: 6
- Budget: $30,933,000 (2020-21)
- NCES District ID: 1916530

Students and staff
- Students: 2,309 (2022-23)
- Teachers: 146.11 FTE
- Staff: 145.69 FTE
- Student–teacher ratio: 15.80
- Athletic conference: Missouri River
- District mascot: Bulldogs
- Colors: Red and Black

Other information
- Website: www.lemarscsd.org

The Le Mars Community School District, or Le Mars Community Schools, is a rural public school district headquartered in Le Mars, Iowa. The school district, entirely in Plymouth County, provides education for students living in Le Mars, Brunsville, Craig, Merrill, and Struble, in addition to the surrounding rural areas. The mascot is the Bulldogs and their colors are red and black.

== Schools ==
The district operates six individual school buildings, all located in Le Mars:

- Clark Elementary School
- Franklin Elementary School
- Kluckhohn Elementary School
- Individualized Learning Center
- Le Mars Middle School
- Le Mars High School

Alomg with those schools, the Trades and Industry program has their own building northeast of Franklin Elementary School that is home to the welding and automotive trade programs.

=== Le Mars Community High School ===
==== Athletics ====
The Bulldogs compete in the Missouri River Conference in the following sports:

- Baseball
- Basketball (Boys and Girls)
- Bowling (Boys and Girls)
- Cross Country (Boys and Girls)
- Football
  - 1973 Class 3A State Champions
- Golf (Boys and Girls)
- Soccer (Boys and Girls)
- Softball
- Tennis (Boys and Girls)
- Track and Field (Boys and Girls)
- Volleyball
- Wrestling (Boys and Girls)
- Dance Team

Activities and Extracurriculars

- Fellowship of Christian Athletes
- Lead Dog Leadership
- Video Media
- Gender and Sexuality Alliance
- Quiz Bowl
- Gaming Club
- Drama
- Speech
- Various Cheer Teams
- Spanish Club

== See also ==
- List of school districts in Iowa
- List of high schools in Iowa
