= Reeves Farmstead Historic District =

Historic district in Iowa, United States

- Formerly listed on the U.S. National Register of Historic Places
- U.S. Historic district
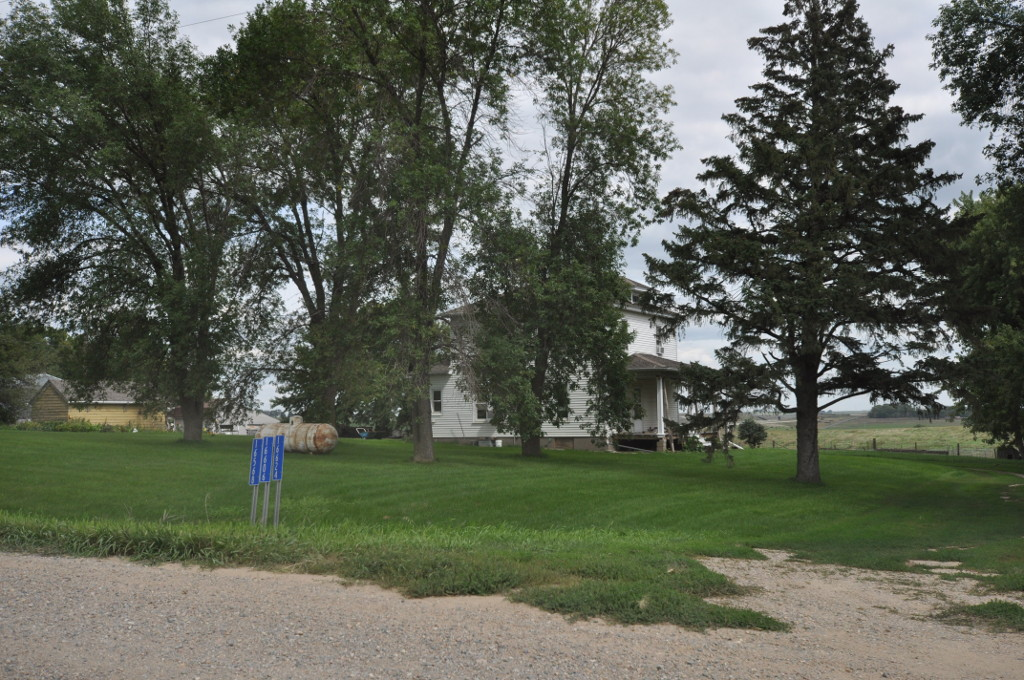

- Location within Iowa Location within the United States
- Location: Lake St.
- Nearest city: Le Mars, Iowa
- Coordinates: 42°48′50″N 96°11′36.8″W
- Area: 2.07 acres (0.84 ha)
- NRHP reference No.: 00001680

Significant dates
- Added to NRHP: January 26, 2001
- Removed from NRHP: December 2, 2020

The Reeves Farmstead Historic District was a nationally recognized historic district located north of Le Mars, Iowa, United States. It was listed on the National Register of Historic Places in 2001. At the time of its nomination the district consisted of 13 resources, including 11 contributing buildings, one non-contributing building, and one non-contributing object. The contributing buildings include an American Four Square house, a barn, cob house and wash house, hen house, outhouse, machine shed, corn crib, two hog houses, and a garage. The non-contributing building is a second garage built in the late 20th century, and the non-contributing object is an incomplete wind mill. The buildings were all built in the late 19th- or early 20th century, but exact dates are uncertain. The fully integrated farmstead from the early to mid 20th century features buildings that utilize simple architecture that was typical of many Iowa farms. It was removed from the National Register of Historic Places in 2020.
