= Struble, Iowa =

- City
- Location of Struble, Iowa
- Coordinates: 42°53′40″N 96°11′40″W
- Country: USA
- State: Iowa
- County: Plymouth

Area
  - Total: 0.15 sq mi (0.40 km^{2})
  - Land: 0.15 sq mi (0.40 km^{2})
  - Water: 0 sq mi (0.00 km^{2})
- Elevation: 1,266 ft (386 m)

Population (2020)
  - Total: 67
  - Density: 429.0/sq mi (165.64/km^{2})
- Time zone: UTC-6 (Central (CST))
  - Summer (DST): UTC-5 (CDT)
- ZIP code: 51031
- Area code: 712
- FIPS code: 19-75945
- GNIS feature ID: 2395990

Struble is a city in Plymouth County, Iowa, United States, along the West Branch of the Floyd River. The population was 67 at the time of the 2020 census.

== Geography ==
Struble is located in Elgin Township, some seven miles north of LeMars.

According to the United States Census Bureau, the city has a total area of 0.16 square miles (0.41 km^{2}), all land.

There is one main street running east–west with commercial buildings, now vacant. At the west end of Main Street is one active church and a cemetery. Just to the east of town a BNSF Railway line runs north–south. Most of Struble consists of well-kept private homes. Beyond are cultivated fields on gently rolling farmland.

== Demographics ==
Historical populations
Year	Pop.	±%
1900	172	—
1910	327	+90.1%
1920	129	−60.6%
1930	161	+24.8%
1940	134	−16.8%
1950	91	−32.1%
1960	74	−18.7%
1970	59	−20.3%
1980	70	+18.6%
1990	67	−4.3%
2000	85	+26.9%
2010	78	−8.2%
2020	67	−14.1%
Source:"U.S. Census website". United States Census Bureau. and Iowa Data Center; Source: U.S. Decennial Census

=== 2020 census ===
As of the census of 2020, there were 67 people, 26 households, and 17 families residing in the city. The population density was 429.0 inhabitants per square mile (165.6/km^{2}). There were 32 housing units at an average density of 204.9 per square mile (79.1/km^{2}). The racial makeup of the city was 91.0% White, 0.0% Black or African American, 1.5% Native American, 0.0% Asian, 0.0% Pacific Islander, 0.0% from other races and 7.5% from two or more races. Hispanic or Latino persons of any race comprised 1.5% of the population.

Of the 26 households, 38.5% of which had children under the age of 18 living with them, 46.2% were married couples living together, 11.5% were cohabitating couples, 19.2% had a female householder with no spouse or partner present and 23.1% had a male householder with no spouse or partner present. 34.6% of all households were non-families. 30.8% of all households were made up of individuals, 15.4% had someone living alone who was 65 years old or older.

The median age in the city was 39.8 years. 29.9% of the residents were under the age of 20; 6.0% were between the ages of 20 and 24; 22.4% were from 25 and 44; 28.4% were from 45 and 64; and 13.4% were 65 years of age or older. The gender makeup of the city was 43.3% male and 56.7% female.

=== 2010 census ===
As of the census of 2010, there were 78 people, 33 households, and 20 families living in the city. The population density was 487.5 inhabitants per square mile (188.2/km^{2}). There were 35 housing units at an average density of 218.8 per square mile (84.5/km^{2}). The racial makeup of the city was 84.6% White, 10.3% from other races, and 5.1% from two or more races. Hispanic or Latino of any race were 14.1% of the population.

There were 33 households, of which 30.3% had children under the age of 18 living with them, 48.5% were married couples living together, 6.1% had a female householder with no husband present, 6.1% had a male householder with no wife present, and 39.4% were non-families. 39.4% of all households were made up of individuals, and 15.2% had someone living alone who was 65 years of age or older. The average household size was 2.36 and the average family size was 3.15.

The median age in the city was 41 years. 26.9% of residents were under the age of 18; 6.4% were between the ages of 18 and 24; 19.1% were from 25 to 44; 36% were from 45 to 64; and 11.5% were 65 years of age or older. The gender makeup of the city was 51.3% male and 48.7% female.

=== 2000 census ===
As of the census of 2000, there were 85 people, 33 households, and 20 families living in the city. The population density was 546.2 inhabitants per square mile (210.9/km^{2}). There were 35 housing units at an average density of 224.9 per square mile (86.8/km^{2}). The racial makeup of the city was 92.94% White, 1.18% from other races, and 5.88% from two or more races. Hispanic or Latino of any race were 7.06% of the population.

There were 33 households, out of which 39.4% had children under the age of 18 living with them, 51.5% were married couples living together, 6.1% had a female householder with no husband present, and 36.4% were non-families. 36.4% of all households were made up of individuals, and 6.1% had someone living alone who was 65 years of age or older. The average household size was 2.58 and the average family size was 3.48.

In the city, the population was spread out, with 36.5% under the age of 18, 1.2% from 18 to 24, 36.5% from 25 to 44, 15.3% from 45 to 64, and 10.6% who were 65 years of age or older. The median age was 36 years. For every 100 females, there were 129.7 males. For every 100 females age 18 and over, there were 107.7 males.

The median income for a household in the city was $37,813, and the median income for a family was $45,833. Males had a median income of $26,875 versus $21,042 for females. The per capita income for the city was $16,423. None of the population and none of the families were below the poverty line.

== Education ==
The Le Mars Community School District operates local area public schools.

== Notable people ==
- Jim Nicholson, former United States Secretary of Veterans Affairs, Republican National Committee chairman and U.S. Ambassador to the Holy See. Born and raised in Struble.
- Isaac S. Struble, Congressman (1883–1891) for whom Struble, Iowa is named. Struble lived in nearby LeMars until his death in 1913.
