= Lewis Wellington Hillyer =

American politician (1818–1897)

Lewis Wellington Hillyer (1818–1897) was an American politician.

Hillyer was a native of Licking County, Ohio, born in 1818. After attending Granville College, he worked alongside his brother and brother-in-law as a merchant, then joined the wholesaler firm Avery, Butler & Cecil. Hillyer moved to Taylor County, Iowa, in 1858, and became a farmer. Politically, Hillyer was affiliated with the Republican Party and served as a county supervisor before his election to the Iowa Senate. He held the District 7 seat between 1864 and 1868. Hillyer died on 29 May 1897.
