= Le Mars Public Library =

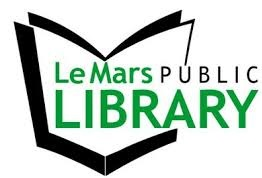

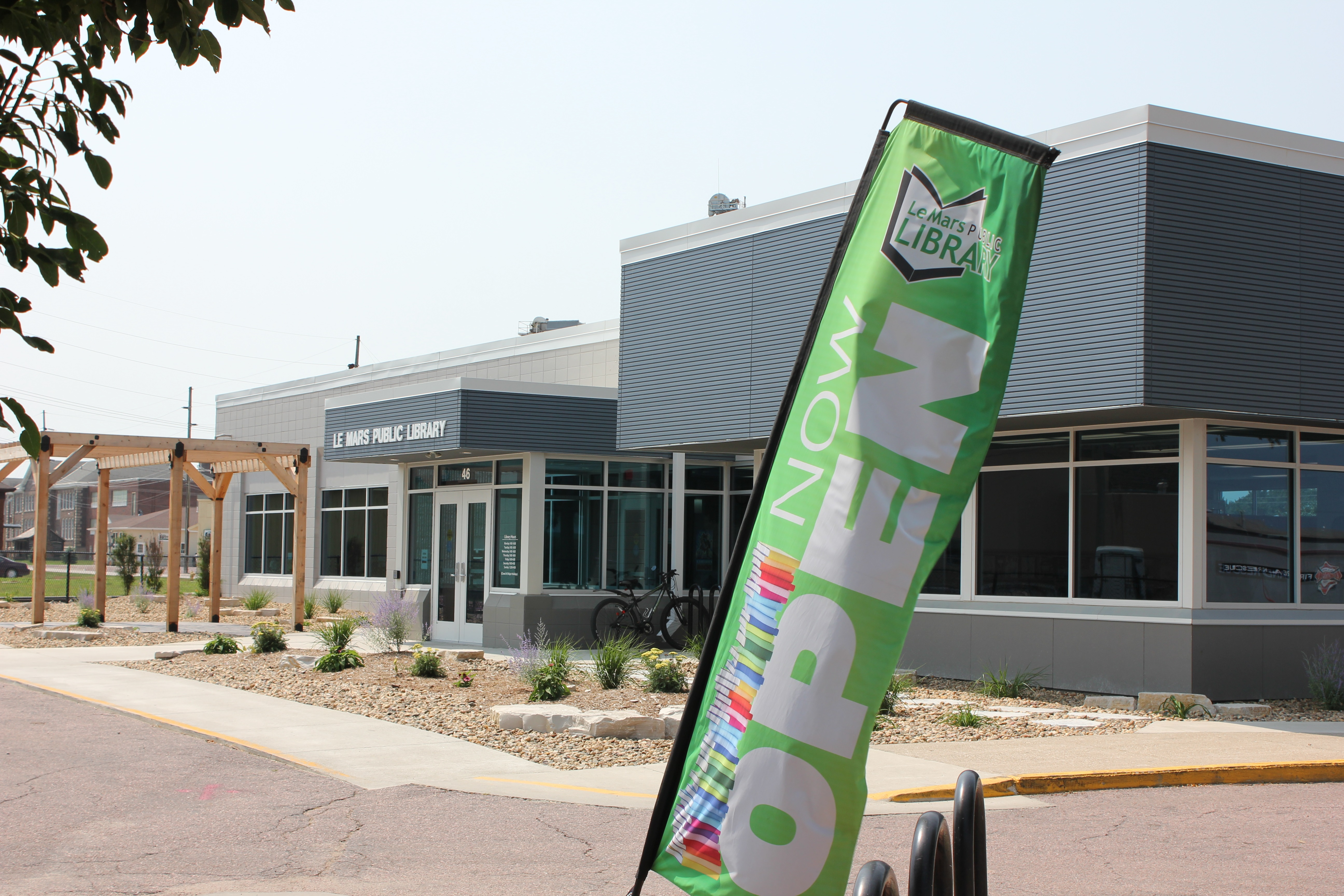
- 42.7914°N 96.1675°W
- Location: Le Mars, Iowa
- Established: 1876

Other information
- Website: https://www.lemars.lib.ia.us/

Le Mars Public Library is located in Le Mars, Iowa. It is the largest library in Plymouth County and has been in operation since 1876.

== History ==
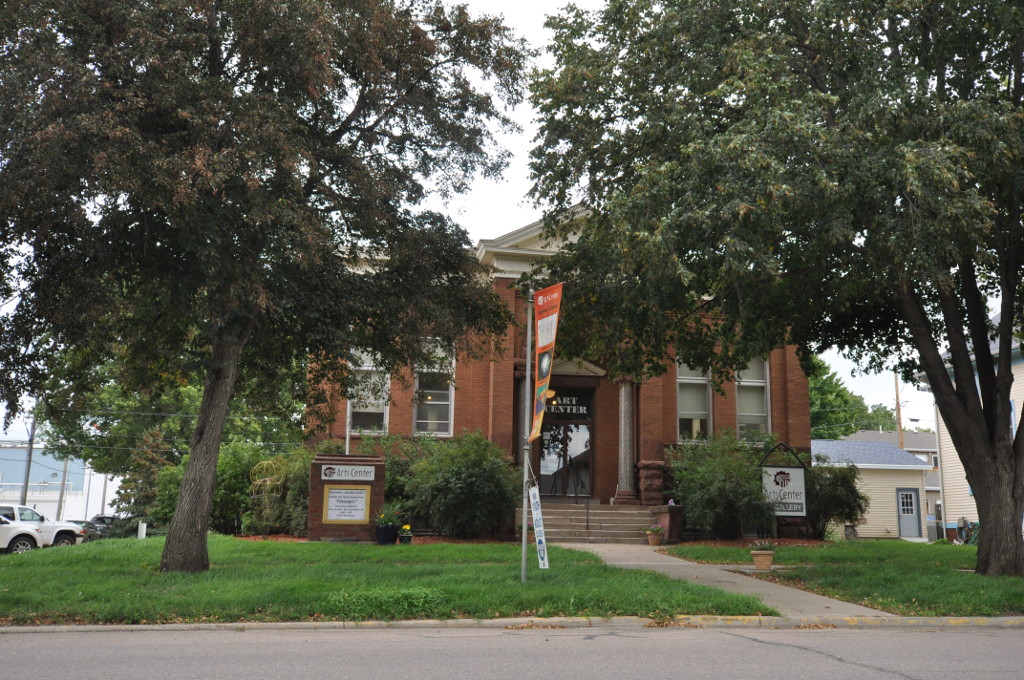
The Carnegie building, former location of the Le Mars Public Library and listed on the NRHP.

The library was created by a group of citizens on the evening of March 11, 1876. Their first meeting was held at the office of Mr. A. H. Lawrence, during which the Le Mars Library Association was formed. Several local women were elected to library association leadership positions. In the beginning, the library's collection was only available to those who purchased a membership. The library eventually eliminated memberships and began charging 10 cents per book, with a check-out period of 2 weeks.

The library's collection of books was housed in various commercial buildings around town. For example, in April 1880, the library was moved to Tom Dodson's new store on upper Main Street. Discussion about transferring the library into the keeping of the city of Le Mars began in 1881. By 1885, the city had taken over the operation and support of the library, and the books were housed in rooms above the city offices.

The City Council, Library Board of Trustees, and local P.E.O.approached the Carnegie Corporation of New York for a grant to build a library building and its application was accepted on January 22, 1903. The total grant paid by the Carnegie Corporation was $12,500. John Werling designed the single-story Renaissance Revival building. The exterior walls are of pink-buff brick and the high basement walls are of rock-faced granite. The main entrance protrudes slightly from the main facade, and it is capped with triangular pediment. Within the tympanum are the initials "A.C." for Andrew Carnegie.

The Carnegie building was dedicated on February 17, 1904, and housed 3,885 books. It continued to serve the community until it was deemed too small. The old building was eventually rededicated as the Le Mars Civic Center and housed the Le Mars Arts Council and Le Mars Chamber of Commerce. It was listed on the National Register of Historic Places in 1979. The chamber moved out in 1991, and the building is currently known as the Le Mars Arts Center.

Upon outgrowing the Carnegie building, the library board began to investigate new locations. A former 7,600-square-foot Red Owl Supermarket building was proposed as a new home for the library. After some contention and a lengthy renovation, the new building was purchased, and the library was relocated in 1976. The renovations were near completion when the library reopened on August 25, 1976. The dedication for the library at the new location was held on April 21, 1977. In 1986, a totem pole was presented to the library from the Le Mars Area Woodcarvers. It features mascots from the town's high schools, the Tonsfeldt round barn, a corn stalk, and more. In 2018, the totem pole was relocated to the Le Mars Art Center, the Carnegie building which formerly housed the library.

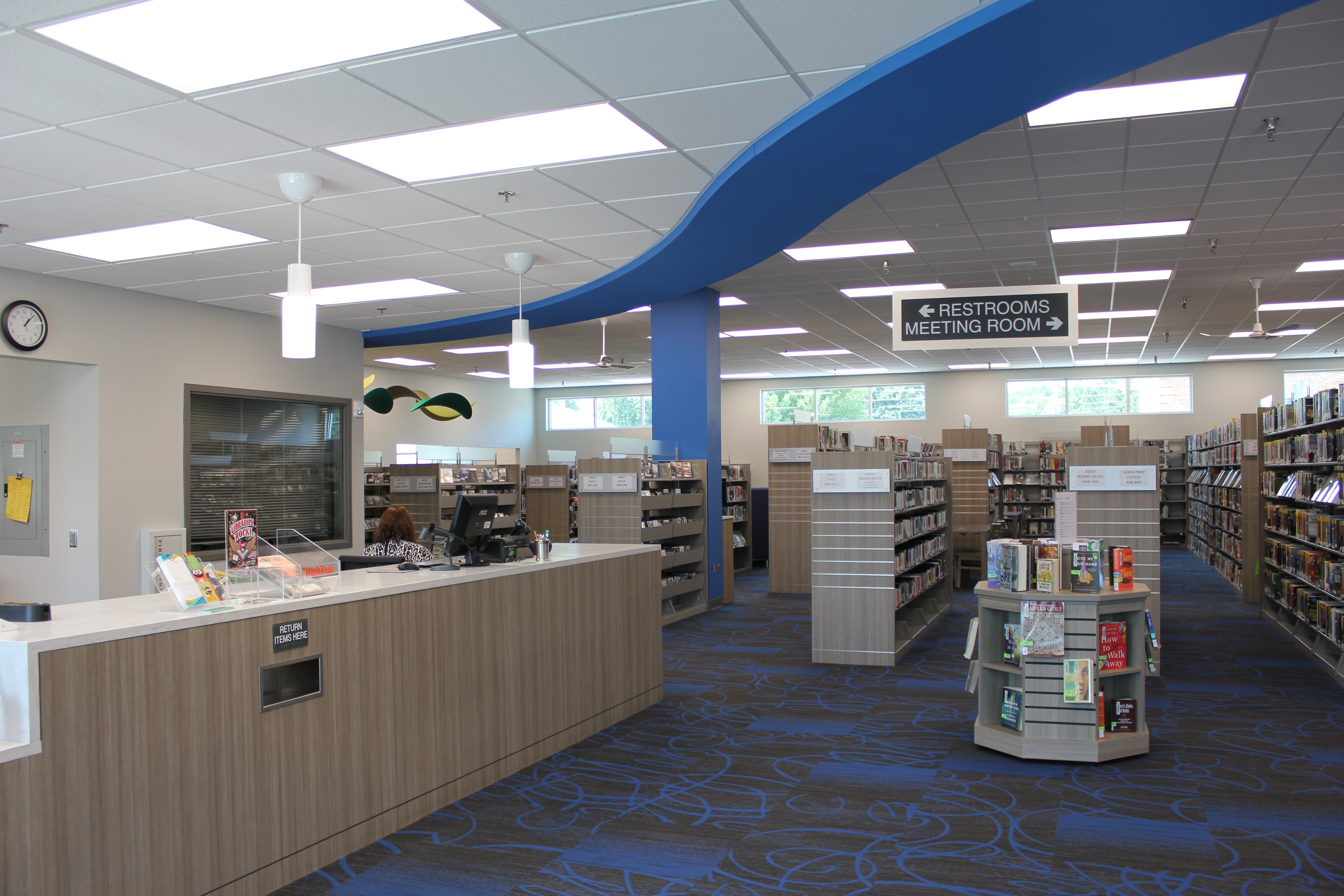
Newly renovated interior of the library.

=== 2017 Renovations ===
The library underwent extensive renovations in 2017. In April 2017, it temporarily moved to the Le Mars Eagles Club across the street. Architect FEH Design and contractor Wiltgen Brothers, Inc. reconfigured the space, upgraded the interior, and added more natural light. The new library features a special children's space, which includes a tree for the entrance, a Lego® area, a magnetic "Alley Art" wall, a mini ice cream truck play structure, and a puppet show stage

The library reopened to the public on December 20, 2017. The renovations were funded by private donations, grants, library funds, a Rural Economic Development Loan and Grant (REDLG) loan, and Local Option Sales Tax (LOST) funds.
