= Plymouth Roller Milling Company =

The defunct Plymouth Roller Milling Company was known as one of the largest mills in Iowa and was located in Le Mars, Iowa within Plymouth County.

== History ==
Frank W. Burns was born in Milford, New Hampshire in 1844. Burn enlisted in the American Civil War in 1862, alongside the 104th Illinois Infantry Regiment, until the end of the war. He was wounded during a raid in Huntsville, Tennessee during his enlistment. After the war ended, he finished school and joined the milling business with his brother, Fred W. Burns. In 1878, Burns moved to Le Mars, Iowa and erected a mill which had a daily capacity of 250 barrels of flour and eight car-loads of feed. The mill later burned down in 1884 and shortly after the fire, Burns built the Plymouth Roller mills which carried a larger daily capacity than the previous mill, with 300 barrels of flour and twelve car-loads of feed. The mill was located on Eagle Street between Fourth and Fifth streets in Le Mars.

Burns was the treasurer and general manager of the company until 1894, later becoming president of the company until he died on June 6, 1898, while living in Seattle, Washington.
