= Seney, Iowa =

- Unincorporated community
- Location within Iowa
- Coordinates: 42°51′10″N 96°07′51″W
- Country: United States
- State: Iowa
- County: Plymouth
- Time zone: UTC-6 (Central (EST))
  - Summer (DST): UTC-5 (EDT)
- Area code: 712

Seney is an unincorporated community in Plymouth County, in the U.S. state of Iowa.

== History ==
Seney was platted in 1872. It was named for George L. Seney, a railroad official. A post office was established at Seney in 1873, and remained in operation until it was discontinued in 1934.

In 1874 Rev. J.T. Walker, pastor of the LeMars Methodist Church came out and organized this group into a Methodist class. The church was incorporated in 1876. The group met at Seney when the school house was built there in 1876. The village of Seney, a station on the railway line, was platted Dec. 7, 1872, on Section 23 of Elgin Township. 1872 was when the Sioux City and St. Paul Railroad was completed from Worthington to LeMars and a station was established at Seney.

In 1880 the church was built at a cost of $1,600. “It is a frame building, twenty-eight by forty feet, will seat 175 people, and is provided with a 760-pound bell. The work was done by Mr. Marsters, and the lots, two in number, were donated by the railroad company. A parsonage, which cost $450, was built prior to the church edifice. The present membership of the church is forty-five. A good Sabbath-school, which averages fifty-five pupils, is a great aid to the church proper. W.C. Lancaster is the superintendent.”

The main sanctuary of the church as it stands today is this “frame building, twenty-eight by forty feet.” However, in the beginning, the pulpit would have been to the west rather than to the south as it is presently. The $450 parsonage would have been to the west of the church.

The church at Seney was built through the liberal donation of a millionaire, Mr. George L. Seney, who was a stockholder in the old St. Paul and Sioux City (now “Omaha”) Railroad Company, and who gave one thousand dollars toward the building of the church at the town named for him. He also endowed a college at Nashville, Tennessee, and spent thousands of dollars in trying to raise a large grove of larches at Seney, this county. He was thwarted to some extent by a series of dry years, though no one, in going over this line of road to the north, can fail to observe a fine grove as a result of his labors at that point. The balance of the money for the Methodist church at Seney was contributed by citizens there and in the surrounding country.”

The Seney Grove was landmark for many years, and people for many miles around enjoyed its beauty. (The larch tree is a deciduous pine tree, which means it loses its green needles in the winter – a unique tree!) The Seney church used the grove for many events. Sunday school and church picnics and Fourth of July celebrations were held there, and the young folks had food stands, baseball games, and patriotic programs. At Christmas time, a manger scene was set up in the grove with life-size mannequins dressed as the Holy Family with bales of straw in the background and lights.

The population was 87 in 1940.
