= Brunsville, Iowa =

- City
- Location of Brunsville, Iowa
- Coordinates: 42°48′40″N 96°15′59″W
- Country: USA
- State: Iowa
- County: Plymouth

Area
  - Total: 0.23 sq mi (0.60 km^{2})
  - Land: 0.23 sq mi (0.60 km^{2})
  - Water: 0 sq mi (0.00 km^{2})
- Elevation: 1,260 ft (380 m)

Population (2020)
  - Total: 129
  - Density: 553.2/sq mi (213.58/km^{2})
- Time zone: UTC-6 (Central (CST))
  - Summer (DST): UTC-5 (CDT)
- ZIP code: 51008
- Area code: 712
- FIPS code: 19-08875
- GNIS feature ID: 2393444

Brunsville is a city in Plymouth County, Iowa, United States. The population was 129 at the 2020 census.

== Geography ==
According to the United States Census Bureau, the city has a total area of 0.24 square miles (0.62 km^{2}), all land.

== Demographics ==
Historical populations
Year	Pop.	±%
1920	111	—
1930	134	+20.7%
1940	109	−18.7%
1950	112	+2.8%
1960	128	+14.3%
1970	125	−2.3%
1980	140	+12.0%
1990	137	−2.1%
2000	146	+6.6%
2010	151	+3.4%
2020	129	−14.6%
Source:"U.S. Census website". United States Census Bureau. and Iowa Data Center; Source: U.S. Decennial Census

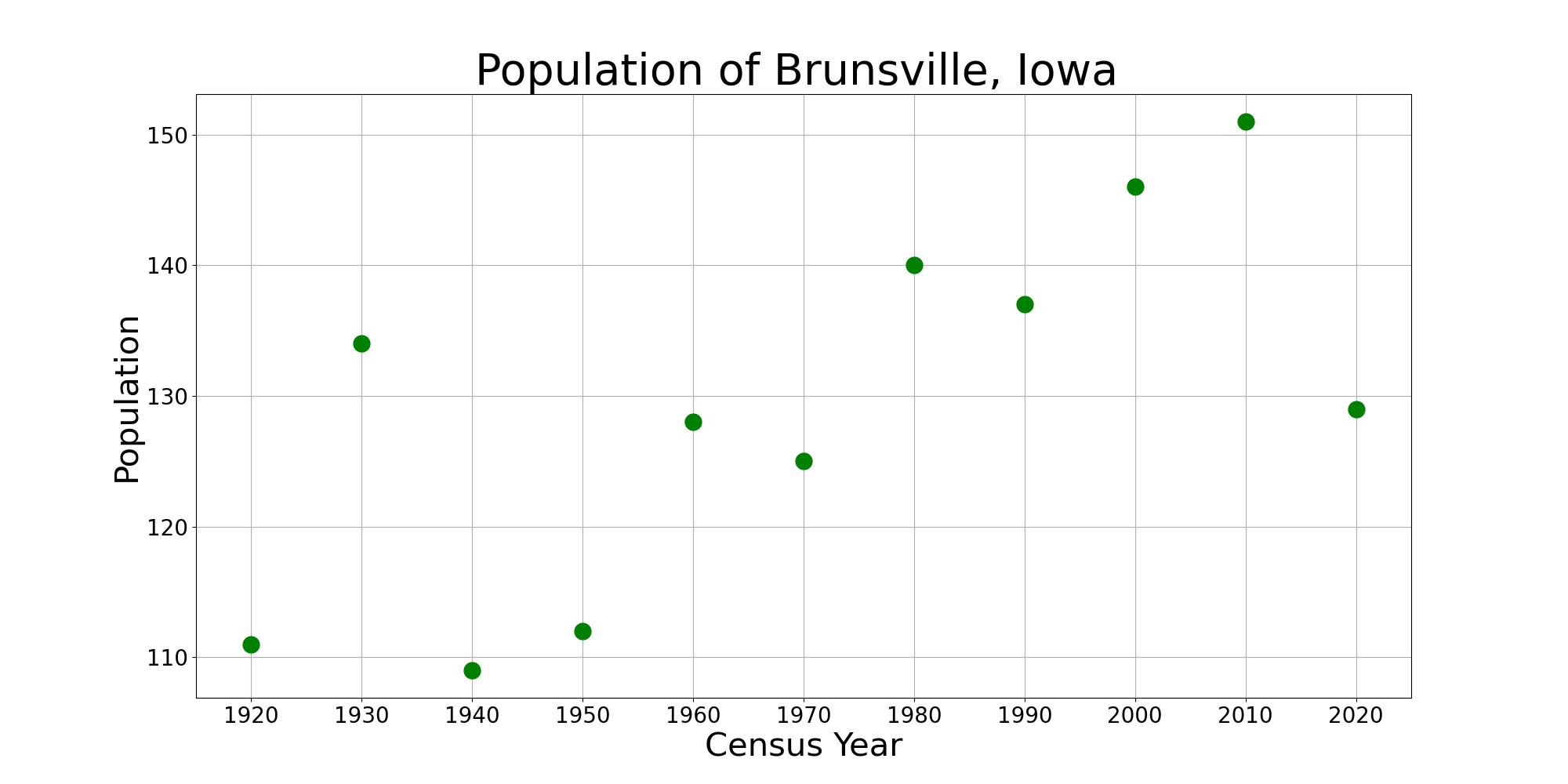
The population of Brunsville, Iowa from US census data

=== 2020 census ===
As of the census of 2020, there were 129 people, 59 households, and 39 families residing in the city. The population density was 553.2 inhabitants per square mile (213.6/km^{2}). There were 66 housing units at an average density of 283.0 per square mile (109.3/km^{2}). The racial makeup of the city was 94.6% White, 0.8% Black or African American, 0.0% Native American, 0.0% Asian, 0.0% Pacific Islander, 0.0% from other races and 4.7% from two or more races. Hispanic or Latino persons of any race comprised 7.0% of the population.

Of the 59 households, 35.6% of which had children under the age of 18 living with them, 42.4% were married couples living together, 8.5% were cohabitating couples, 30.5% had a female householder with no spouse or partner present and 18.6% had a male householder with no spouse or partner present. 33.9% of all households were non-families. 30.5% of all households were made up of individuals, 15.3% had someone living alone who was 65 years old or older.

The median age in the city was 46.3 years. 24.0% of the residents were under the age of 20; 3.9% were between the ages of 20 and 24; 21.7% were from 25 and 44; 24.0% were from 45 and 64; and 26.4% were 65 years of age or older. The gender makeup of the city was 49.6% male and 50.4% female.

=== 2010 census ===
As of the census of 2010, there were 151 people, 65 households, and 43 families living in the city. The population density was 629.2 inhabitants per square mile (242.9/km^{2}). There were 66 housing units at an average density of 275.0 per square mile (106.2/km^{2}). The racial makeup of the city was 100.0% White. Hispanic or Latino of any race were 0.7% of the population.

There were 65 households, of which 26.2% had children under the age of 18 living with them, 55.4% were married couples living together, 1.5% had a female householder with no husband present, 9.2% had a male householder with no wife present, and 33.8% were non-families. 29.2% of all households were made up of individuals, and 13.9% had someone living alone who was 65 years of age or older. The average household size was 2.32 and the average family size was 2.86.

The median age in the city was 44.3 years. 21.2% of residents were under the age of 18; 6.7% were between the ages of 18 and 24; 23.2% were from 25 to 44; 33% were from 45 to 64; and 15.9% were 65 years of age or older. The gender makeup of the city was 50.3% male and 49.7% female.

=== 2000 census ===
As of the census of 2000, there were 146 people, 59 households, and 41 families living in the city. The population density was 616.4 inhabitants per square mile (238.0/km^{2}). There were 66 housing units at an average density of 278.6 per square mile (107.6/km^{2}). The racial makeup of the city was 97.95% White and 2.05% Asian. Hispanic or Latino of any race were 1.37% of the population.

There were 59 households, out of which 35.6% had children under the age of 18 living with them, 59.3% were married couples living together, 6.8% had a female householder with no husband present, and 30.5% were non-families. 25.4% of all households were made up of individuals, and 15.3% had someone living alone who was 65 years of age or older. The average household size was 2.47 and the average family size was 2.98.

In the city, the population was spread out, with 27.4% under the age of 18, 11.0% from 18 to 24, 21.2% from 25 to 44, 20.5% from 45 to 64, and 19.9% who were 65 years of age or older. The median age was 40 years. For every 100 females, there were 102.8 males. For every 100 females age 18 and over, there were 112.0 males.

The median income for a household in the city was $47,188, and the median income for a family was $47,841. Males had a median income of $34,643 versus $21,250 for females. The per capita income for the city was $23,200. None of the population and none of the families were below the poverty line.

== Education ==
The Le Mars Community School District operates local area public schools.
