= Portland Township, Plymouth County, Iowa =

Township in Plymouth County, Iowa

Coordinates: 42°51′13″N 96°30′14″W

Portland Township is a township in Plymouth County, Iowa in the United States. The township is named after ().

The elevation of Portland Township is listed as 1309 feet above mean sea level.
