= Fredonia Township, Plymouth County, Iowa =

Township in United States

Fredonia Township
- Township
- Interactive map of Fredonia Township
- Coordinates: 42°51′59″N 96°02′11″W
- Country: United States
- State: Iowa
- County: Plymouth
- Elevation: 1,339 ft (408 m)

Fredonia Township is a township in Plymouth County, Iowa in the United States.

The elevation of Fredonia Township is listed as 1339 feet above mean sea level.
