= Meadow Township, Plymouth County, Iowa =

Township in Plymouth County, Iowa

Coordinates: 42°51′58″N 95°55′05″W

Meadow Township is a township in Plymouth County, Iowa in the United States. The township is named after ().

The elevation of Meadow Township is listed as 1345 feet above mean sea level. It has a population of 300 people.
