= Sioux Township, Plymouth County, Iowa =

Township in Plymouth County, Iowa

Coordinates: 42°41′45″N 96°31′32″W

Sioux Township is a township in Plymouth County, Iowa, United States. The township was set off from portions of Lincoln Township and Plymouth Township by the county supervisors. It is named after the Big Sioux River, which forms the township's western border.

The elevation of Sioux Township is listed as 1,316 feet (401 m) above mean sea level.
