= Tonsfeldt Round Barn =

- U.S. National Register of Historic Places
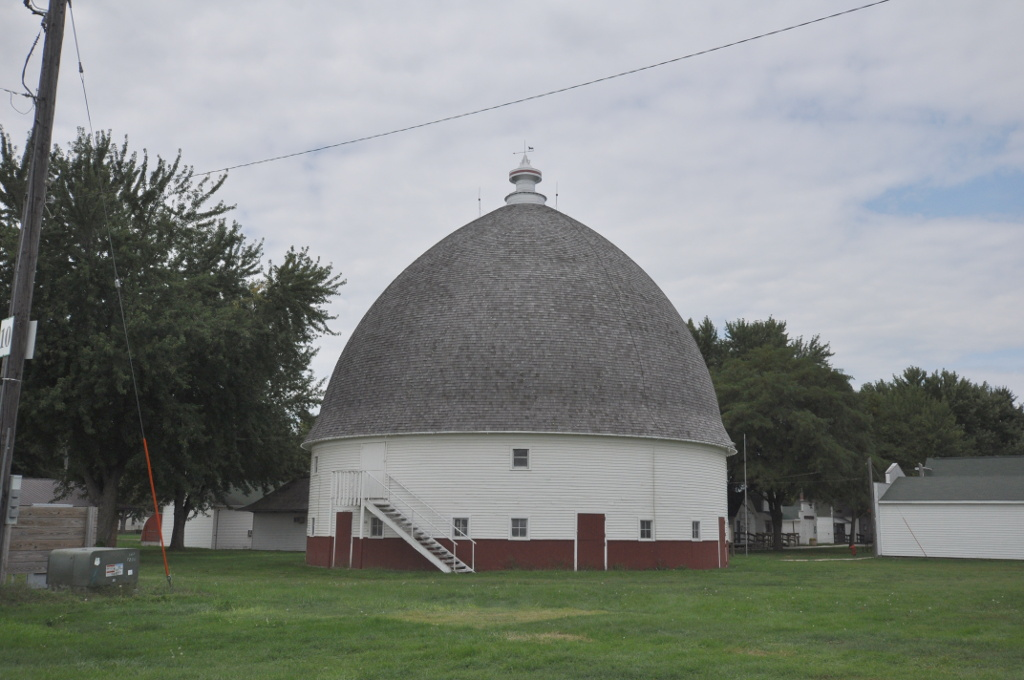

- Location within Iowa Location within the United States
- Location: Plymouth County Fairgrounds, LeMars, Iowa
- Coordinates: 42°47′52″N 96°09′34″W
- Area: less than one acre
- Built: 1918
- MPS: Iowa Round Barns: The Sixty Year Experiment TR
- NRHP reference No.: 86003194
- Added to NRHP: November 19, 1986

The Tonsfeldt Round Barn is a historic building located on the Plymouth County Fairgrounds in LeMars, Iowa, United States. It was built in 1918 to house H.P. Tonsfeldt's purebread Polled Hereford cattle, and prize bull, on his farm west of the city. The building is a true round barn that measures 82 by 68 feet (25 m × 21 m). The barn features white horizontal siding, an aerator and a Gothic curved roof. The self-supporting Gothic-arch dome of this barn is a unique feature on Iowa's round barns. In 1981 the barn was moved from the farm to the fairgrounds in order to preserve it. It is now used for exhibit space. The barn has been listed on the National Register of Historic Places since 1986.
