= America Township, Plymouth County, Iowa =

Township in Plymouth County, Iowa

Coordinates: 42°46′44″N 96°09′17″W

America Township is a township in Plymouth County, Iowa, United States. The elevation of America Township is listed as 1,332 feet above sea level. The population of America Township in 2018 was 10,244. The county seat of Le Mars is located in the township.
