= Preston Township, Plymouth County, Iowa =

Township in Plymouth County, Iowa

Coordinates: 42°51′57″N 96°23′26″W

Preston Township is a township in Plymouth County, Iowa in the United States.

The elevation of Preston Township is listed as 1427 feet above mean sea level.
