= Hancock Township, Plymouth County, Iowa =

Township in Plymouth County, Iowa

Coordinates: 42°36′41″N 96°28′52″W

Hancock Township is a township in Plymouth County, Iowa in the United States. The township is named after ().

The elevation of Hancock Township is listed as 1224 feet above mean sea level.
