= Washington Township, Plymouth County, Iowa =

Township in Plymouth County, Iowa

Coordinates: 42°46′43″N 96°16′20″W

Washington Township is a township in Plymouth County, Iowa in the United States. The township is named after George Washington.

The elevation of Washington Township is listed as 1227 feet above mean sea level.
