= Westfield Township, Plymouth County, Iowa =

Township in Plymouth County, Iowa

Coordinates: 42°46′14″N 96°32′06″W

Westfield Township is a township in Plymouth County, Iowa in the United States. The township is named after ().

The elevation of Westfield Township is listed as 1319 feet above mean sea level.
