= Perry Township, Plymouth County, Iowa =

Township in Plymouth County, Iowa

Coordinates: 42°36′20″N 96°23′26″W

Perry Township is a township in Plymouth County, Iowa in the United States. The township is named after ().

The elevation of Perry Township is listed as 1348 feet above mean sea level.
