= Stanton Township, Plymouth County, Iowa =

Township in Plymouth County, Iowa

Coordinates: 42°41′31″N 96°09′18″W

Stanton Township is a township in Plymouth County, Iowa in the United States. The township is named after ().

The elevation of Stanton Township is listed as 1398 feet above mean sea level.
