= James, Iowa =

- Unincorporated community
- Location within Iowa
- Coordinates: 42°34′40″N 96°19′03″W
- Country: United States
- State: Iowa
- County: Plymouth
- Elevation: 1,132 ft (345 m)
- Time zone: UTC-6 (Central (EST))
  - Summer (DST): UTC-5 (EDT)
- ZIP code: 51108
- Area code: 712

James is an unincorporated community in Plymouth County, in the U.S. state of Iowa.

== History ==
A post office was established at James in 1874, and remained in operation until it was discontinued in 1943. The community was named for James Blair, the brother of railroad magnate John Insley Blair. James' population was 25 in 1902, and 35 in 1925. The population was 39 in 1940.
