= St. George's Episcopal Church (Le Mars, Iowa) =

- St. George’s Episcopal Church
- U.S. National Register of Historic Places
- Location within Iowa Location within the United States
- Location: 400 1st Ave., SE. Le Mars, Iowa
- Coordinates: 42°47′16.8″N 96°09′53.3″W
- Area: less than one acre
- Built: 1881
- Architectural style: Carpenter Gothic
- NRHP reference No.: 76000797
- Added to NRHP: November 21, 1976

St. George's Episcopal Church is a historic Episcopal Church building located in Le Mars, Iowa, United States. Designed in the Carpenter Gothic style of architecture, it was erected in 1881. It is one of the few remnants of the English era in Le Mars' early history. The church building was listed on the National Register of Historic Places in 1976.

== History ==
After Fred and William Close of England opened a land sales office in LeMars in 1879, they began to plan an English colony. Men from England were sent to the Le Mars area to study farming in the late 19th century. Over the years over 1,000 people would settle here as a part of this program. Some were the sons of established upper-class English families who returned home after they learned farm management techniques. Grace Mission was established in order to serve their spiritual needs. Its first building was located at Fifth and Hubbard Streets, now First Street SW and Fifth Avenue SW. They later moved to the Apollo Hall.

The congregation reorganized itself as St. George's Church on October 4, 1881. The present church building was completed the same year for about $3,200. The money was sent from England to build the church. It was consecrated on June 9, 1882. The church's first rector was a Cambridge graduate, and his successor graduated from Oxford. By the 1890s, the parishioners were mostly non-English residents as most of the English had left Le Mars. The church is one of the few structures left from the city's English era. The parish hall was built in 1963 and housed St. George's Preschool. St. George's is still an active parish in the Diocese of Iowa.

== Architecture ==
The church building is built over a limestone foundation, and utilizes a unique board and batten border just below the horizontal clapboard. There are narrow hoods over the Gothic arched windows. The double-hung windows feature various designs of colored glass. The windows on the south side contain unique cut glass. The lancet arch over each window is pressed glass. There is an entrance tower on the main façade. It was originally capped by a small spire, but it was removed around the turn of the 20th century and the roof gable was extended to cover the tower. The wooden exterior steps feature railings that were reproduced in the early 1990s to mimic the early banisters. The pews on the inside are original to the church. The altar is similar in appearance to the original and the pulpit dates from 1892.
