= Northampton Municipal Park =

Park in Churchville, Pennsylvania, United States

- Location within Pennsylvania Location within the United States
- Type: Municipal park
- Location: Churchville, Northampton Township, Bucks County, Pennsylvania
- Coordinates: 40.203287°N 75.042685°W
- Area: 89 acres (36 hectares)
- Operator: Northampton Township Parks & Recreation

Northampton Municipal Park is a municipal park located in Churchville, Northampton Township, Bucks County, Pennsylvania, United States. It is 89 acres (36 hectares) large. There are recreation and picnic facilities at the park in addition to an amphitheater.

== Recreation ==
The park is home to a host of different sports fields/arenas for local recreation. These include softball, soccer, and baseball fields, a roller hockey rink, and basketball courts. The baseball fields host Miracle League baseball, which is for adults and children who suffer from mental and physical disabilities. In addition to the sports areas, there is a playground targeted towards younger children. The park has walking trails and a butterfly garden.
