= Concord Township, Woodbury County, Iowa =

Township in Iowa, USA

Coordinates: 42°31′N 96°16′W

Concord Township is a township in Woodbury County, Iowa, United States.
