= Municipal Park (Diekirch) =

Public park in Diekirch, Luxembourg

- Interactive map of Municipal Park
- Type: Public urban park
- Location: Diekirch, Luxembourg
- Coordinates: 49°51′45″N 06°09′03″E
- Operator: Diekirch communal council

The parc municipal de Diekirch (Luxembourgish: Stadpark vun Dikrech) is a linear park in Diekirch, in northern Luxembourg.

== Description ==
The park stretches on both sides along the Sauer from the Diekirch municipality border to Ingeldorf (in the southwest) to the municipality border to Gilsdorf (Bettendorf) (in the northeast). The park, which is around 100 m wide and around one and a half km long, is freely accessible all year round.

At the entry of the park, at Avenue de la Gare, there is a water feature. On the right side of the Sauer is the 11.2 hectare Parc découverte de la nature In Bedingen. The Dikricher Béierfest ("Diekirch Beer Festival") usually takes place every summer in the municipal park.

The park is the location of some monuments and public art:

In 1961, Charles Kohl and Edmond Lux created a monument in honor of the Diekirch politician Paul Eyschen (Monument Paul Eyschen). Kohl created the bronze high relief (Eyschen's bust), Lux created the comprehensive sculpture from cubic blocks of Ernzern sandstone.

In 1981, Wenzel Profant created a memorial for the Luxembourg refugees of the Second World War. The white stele consists of two curved, united basalt bodies that seem to flee and float; they are supposed to materialize the memory of the refugees.

An US Memorial, inaugurated in 1984, to commemorate the liberation of Luxembourg by the US Army in September 1944, is also located in the park.
