= Plymouth Township, Plymouth County, Iowa =

Township in Plymouth County, Iowa

Coordinates: 42°41′31″N 96°16′21″W

Plymouth Township is a township in Plymouth County, Iowa in the United States.

The elevation of Plymouth Township is listed as 1178 feet above mean sea level.

== History ==
Plymouth Township was larger when it was first formed. Sioux Township was set off from portions of Lincoln Township and Plymouth Township by the county supervisors.
