= Le Mars Municipal Park and Golf Course Historic District =

Historic district in Iowa, United States

- U.S. National Register of Historic Places
- U.S. Historic district
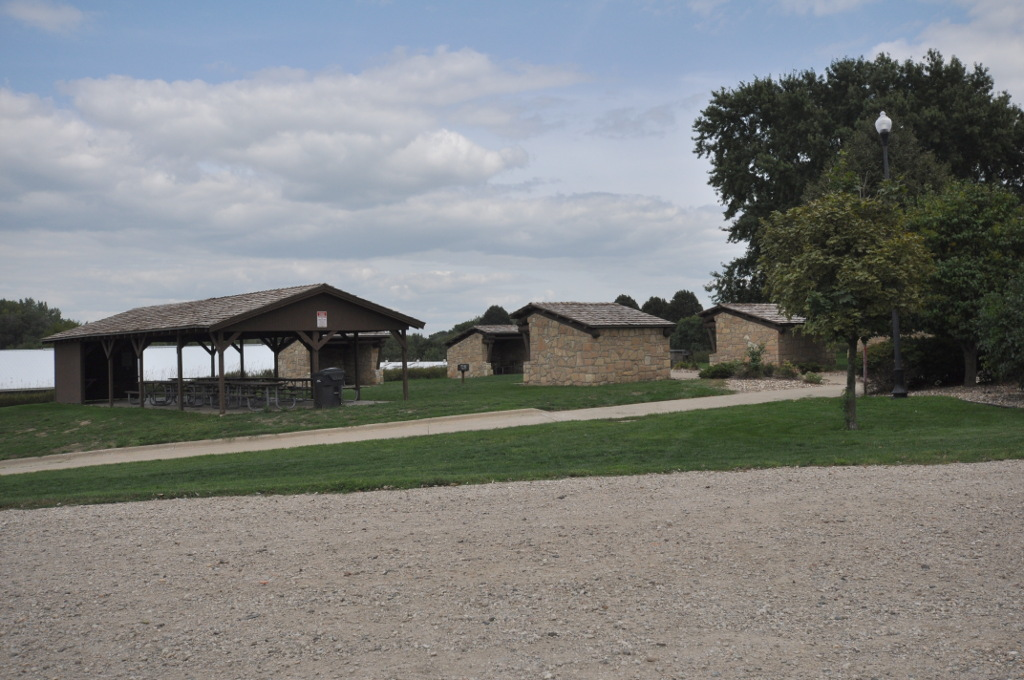

- Location within Iowa Location within the United States
- Location: Between 4th Ave., NE. and Iowa Highway 3 Le Mars, Iowa
- Coordinates: 42°48′10″N 96°09′03″W
- Area: 121 acres (49 ha)
- Built: 1935-1940
- MPS: Conservation Movement in Iowa MPS
- NRHP reference No.: 01000858
- Added to NRHP: August 8, 2001

Le Mars Municipal Park and Golf Course Historic District is a nationally recognized historic district located in Le Mars, Iowa, United States. It was listed on the National Register of Historic Places in 2001. At the time of its nomination the district consisted of 25 resources, including 11 contributing buildings, one contributing site, four contributing structures, eight non-contributing buildings, and one non-contributing structure.

The city of Le Mars acquired 60 acres (24 ha) of land for the park in 1935 for $15,000, and it was dedicated later that year. The state agreed to carryout improving the park and building new facilities over a span of five years as Works Progress Administration (WPA) projects. Work on a nine-hole golf course began in 1936. Additional property was purchased in 1937 bringing the size of the park to 121 acres (49 ha). It took at least five WPA projects to complete the work. The historic buildings and structures include: the west entrance portals, the custodian's cottage, a garage-service building, a small vehicle bridge, two artificial ponds, a bathhouse-shelter house, a Boy Scout/Girl Scout cabin, six Adirondack cabins, the clubhouse, and the golf course. This was one of the largest, if not the largest, recreational park constructed in Iowa in the 1930s. Nine more holes were added to the golf course in 1990, and a bike/walking path was completed in 1999.
