= Grant Township, Plymouth County, Iowa =

Township in Plymouth County, Iowa

Coordinates: 42°51′56″N 96°16′22″W

Grant Township is a township in Plymouth County, Iowa in the United States. The township is named after ().

The elevation of Grant Township is listed as 1355 feet above mean sea level.
