= Elgin Township, Plymouth County, Iowa =

Township in Plymouth County, Iowa

Coordinates: 42°51′57″N 96°09′17″W

Elgin Township is a township in Plymouth County, Iowa in the United States. The township is named after ().

The elevation of Elgin Township is listed as 1286 feet above mean sea level.
