= Le Mars Municipal Airport =

- IATA: LRJ; ICAO: KLRJ; FAA LID: LRJ

Summary
- Airport type: Public
- Owner: City of Le Mars
- Serves: Le Mars, Iowa
- Elevation AMSL: 1,197 ft / 365 m
- Coordinates: 42°46′41″N 096°11′37″W

Map
- Location of airport in Iowa / United States LRJ (the United States)

Runways
Direction	Length		Surface
Direction	ft	m	Surface
18/36	4,605	1,404	Concrete

Statistics
- Aircraft operations (2008): 10,780
- Based aircraft (2017): 24
- Source: Federal Aviation Administration

Le Mars Municipal Airport (IATA: LRJ, ICAO: KLRJ, FAA LID: LRJ) is a city-owned public-use airport located 2 nautical miles (3.7 km; 2.3 mi) southwest of the central business district of Le Mars, a city in Plymouth County, Iowa, United States.

== Facilities and aircraft ==
Le Mars Municipal Airport covers an area of 108 acres (44 ha) at an elevation of 1,197 feet (365 m) above mean sea level. It has one runway designated 18/36 with a concrete surface measuring 4,605 by 75 feet (1,404 x 23 m).

For the 12-month period ending April 17, 2008, the airport had 10,780 aircraft operations, an average of 29 per day: 99.5% general aviation and 0.5% military. In March 2017, there were 24 aircraft based at this airport: 17 single-engine, 2 jet and 5 ultralight.

== See also ==
- List of airports in Iowa
