= Liberty Township, Plymouth County, Iowa =

Township in Plymouth County, Iowa

Coordinates: 42°41′32″N 96°23′25″W

Liberty Township is a township in Plymouth County, Iowa in the United States. The township is named after ().

The elevation of Liberty Township is listed as 1362 feet above mean sea level.
