= Oyens, Iowa =

City in Plymouth County, Iowa, United States

- City
- Location of Oyens, Iowa
- Coordinates: 42°49′11″N 96°03′29″W
- Country: USA
- State: Iowa
- County: Plymouth

Area
  - Total: 0.11 sq mi (0.29 km^{2})
  - Land: 0.11 sq mi (0.29 km^{2})
  - Water: 0 sq mi (0.00 km^{2})
- Elevation: 1,283 ft (391 m)

Population (2020)
  - Total: 92
  - Density: 811.6/sq mi (313.37/km^{2})
- Time zone: UTC-6 (Central (CST))
  - Summer (DST): UTC-5 (CDT)
- ZIP code: 51045
- Area code: 712
- FIPS code: 19-60780
- GNIS feature ID: 2396120

Oyens is a city in Plymouth County, Iowa, United States. The population was 92 at the time of the 2020 census.

== Geography ==
According to the United States Census Bureau, the city has a total area of 0.09 square miles (0.23 km^{2}), all land.

== Demographics ==
Historical populations
Year	Pop.	±%
1910	94	—
1920	100	+6.4%
1930	106	+6.0%
1940	104	−1.9%
1950	95	−8.7%
1960	114	+20.0%
1970	145	+27.2%
1980	146	+0.7%
1990	113	−22.6%
2000	132	+16.8%
2010	103	−22.0%
2020	92	−10.7%
Source:"U.S. Census website". United States Census Bureau. and Iowa Data Center; Source: U.S. Decennial Census

=== 2020 census ===
As of the census of 2020, there were 92 people, 31 households, and 22 families residing in the city. The population density was 811.6 inhabitants per square mile (313.4/km^{2}). There were 42 housing units at an average density of 370.5 per square mile (143.1/km^{2}). The racial makeup of the city was 91.3% White, 0.0% Black or African American, 0.0% Native American, 0.0% Asian, 0.0% Pacific Islander, 0.0% from other races and 8.7% from two or more races. Hispanic or Latino persons of any race comprised 5.4% of the population.

Of the 31 households, 22.6% of which had children under the age of 18 living with them, 67.7% were married couples living together, 0.0% were cohabitating couples, 0.0% had a female householder with no spouse or partner present and 32.3% had a male householder with no spouse or partner present. 29.0% of all households were non-families. 22.6% of all households were made up of individuals, 9.7% had someone living alone who was 65 years old or older.

The median age in the city was 44.5 years. 22.8% of the residents were under the age of 20; 2.2% were between the ages of 20 and 24; 25.0% were from 25 and 44; 31.5% were from 45 and 64; and 18.5% were 65 years of age or older. The gender makeup of the city was 54.3% male and 45.7% female.

=== 2010 census ===
As of the census of 2010, there were 103 people, 42 households, and 30 families living in the city. The population density was 1,144.4 inhabitants per square mile (441.9/km^{2}). There were 45 housing units at an average density of 500.0 per square mile (193.1/km^{2}). The racial makeup of the city was 100.0% White.

There were 42 households, of which 35.7% had children under the age of 18 living with them, 61.9% were married couples living together, 9.5% had a male householder with no wife present, and 28.6% were non-families. 23.8% of all households were made up of individuals, and 9.5% had someone living alone who was 65 years of age or older. The average household size was 2.45 and the average family size was 2.93.

The median age in the city was 40.5 years. 23.3% of residents were under the age of 18; 10.7% were between the ages of 18 and 24; 22.4% were from 25 to 44; 29.2% were from 45 to 64; and 14.6% were 65 years of age or older. The gender makeup of the city was 53.4% male and 46.6% female.

=== 2000 census ===
As of the census of 2000, there were 132 people, 48 households, and 39 families living in the city. The population density was 1,405.9 inhabitants per square mile (542.8/km^{2}). There were 48 housing units at an average density of 511.2 per square mile (197.4/km^{2}). The racial makeup of the city was 100.00% White. Hispanic or Latino of any race were 3.03% of the population.

There were 48 households, out of which 39.6% had children under the age of 18 living with them, 75.0% were married couples living together, 4.2% had a female householder with no husband present, and 16.7% were non-families. 14.6% of all households were made up of individuals, and 2.1% had someone living alone who was 65 years of age or older. The average household size was 2.75 and the average family size was 3.03.

Age spread: 27.3% under the age of 18, 6.8% from 18 to 24, 34.1% from 25 to 44, 23.5% from 45 to 64, and 8.3% who were 65 years of age or older. The median age was 33 years. For every 100 females, there were 116.4 males. For every 100 females age 18 and over, there were 134.1 males.

The median income for a household in the city was $53,333, and the median income for a family was $52,500. Males had a median income of $25,714 versus $25,833 for females. The per capita income for the city was $17,969. There were no families and 2.0% of the population living below the poverty line, including no under eighteens and none of those over 64.
