= Lincoln Township, Plymouth County, Iowa =

Township in Plymouth County, Iowa

Coordinates: 42°36′19″N 96°09′18″W

Lincoln Township is a township in Plymouth County, Iowa in the United States. The township is named after President Abraham Lincoln.

The elevation of Lincoln Township is listed as 1283 feet above mean sea level.

== History ==
Lincoln Township was larger when it was first formed. Sioux Township was set off from portions of Lincoln Township and Plymouth Township by the county supervisors.
