= Johnson Township, Plymouth County, Iowa =

Township in Plymouth County, Iowa

Coordinates: 42°46′43″N 96°23′23″W

Johnson Township is a township in Plymouth County, Iowa in the United States.

The elevation of Johnson Township is listed as 1358 feet above mean sea level.
