= Henry Township, Plymouth County, Iowa =

Township in Plymouth County, Iowa

Coordinates: 42°41′31″N 95°55′10″W

Henry Township is a township in Plymouth County, Iowa in the United States. The township is named after ().

The elevation of Henry Township is listed as 1401 feet above mean sea level.
