= Union Township, Plymouth County, Iowa =

Township in Plymouth County, Iowa

Coordinates: 42°41′32″N 96°02′15″W

Union Township is a township in Plymouth County, Iowa in the United States. The township is named after ().

The elevation of Union Township is listed as 1368 feet above mean sea level.
