= Plymouth County, Iowa =

County in Iowa, United States

- County
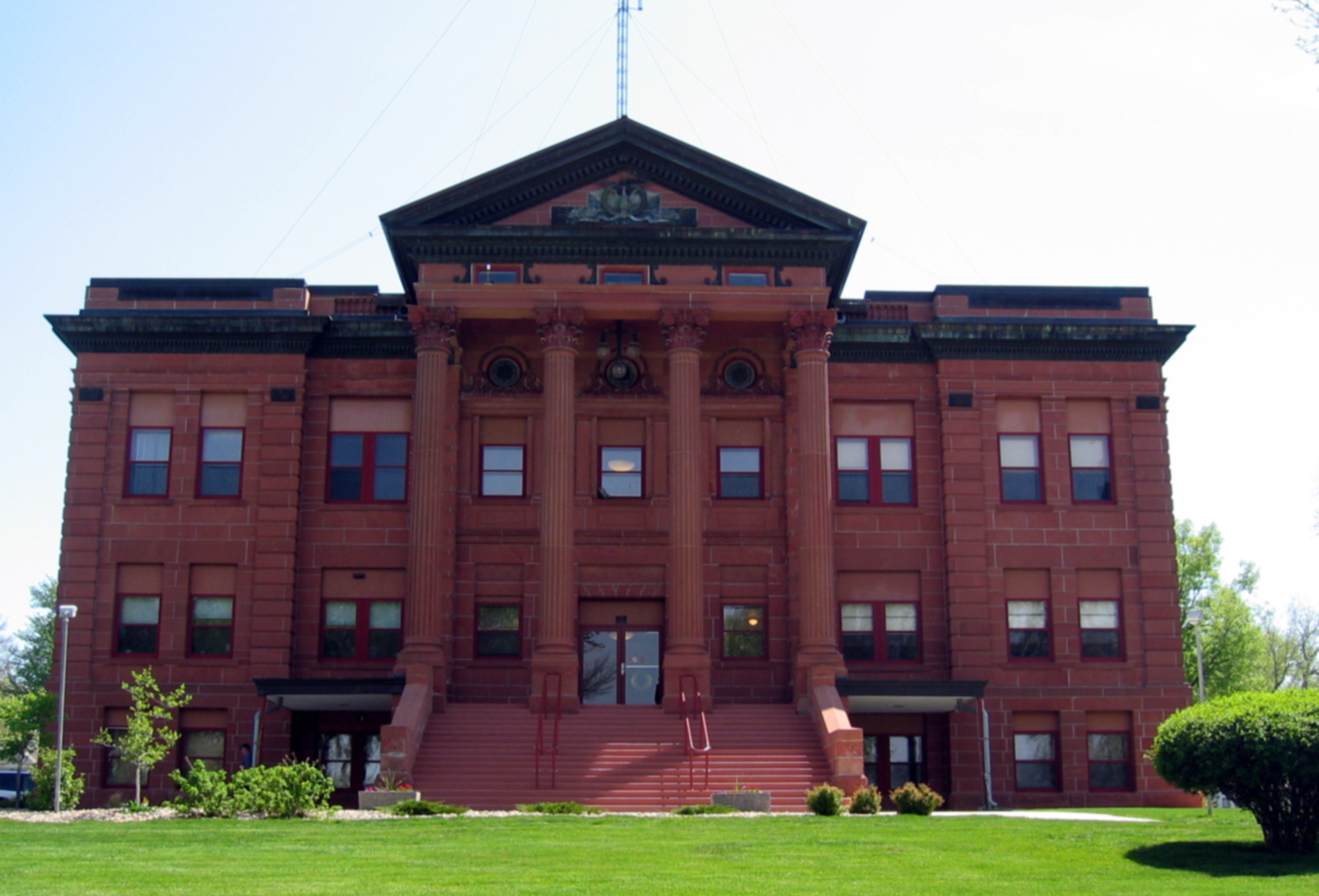
- The Plymouth County Courthouse in Le Mars

- Location within the U.S. state of Iowa
- Coordinates: 42.737615°N 96.215973°W
- Country: United States
- State: Iowa
- Founded: January 15, 1851 (created); October 27, 1858 (organized)
- Named for: Plymouth, Massachusetts
- Seat: Le Mars
- Largest city: Le Mars

Area
  - Total: 863.668 sq mi (2,236.89 km^{2})
  - Land: 862.828 sq mi (2,234.71 km^{2})
  - Water: 0.840 sq mi (2.18 km^{2}) 0.10%

Population (2020)
  - Total: 25,698
  - Estimate (2025): 25,697 ▼
  - Density: 29.783/sq mi (11.499/km^{2})
- Time zone: UTC−6 (Central)
  - Summer (DST): UTC−5 (CDT)
- Area code: 712
- Congressional district: 4th
- Website: plymouthcountyiowa.gov
- Iowa county number 75

Plymouth County is the westernmost county in the U.S. state of Iowa. As of the 2020 census, the population was 25,698, and was estimated to be 25,697 in 2025. The county seat and the largest city is Le Mars. Plymouth County was named after Plymouth, Massachusetts.

Plymouth County is part of the Sioux City metropolitan area.

== History ==
Plymouth County was formed on January 15, 1851. Settlement began in the county in 1856. In October 1859, the first courthouse was built in Melbourne, formerly located in the southeast quarter of section 34, Plymouth Township, about five to six miles due south of Merrill. The first public school opened its doors there with 32 pupils. In 1872 the county seat was moved to Le Mars and a courthouse and jail were built there in 1873. The present Plymouth County Courthouse was built in 1900 of red sandstone.

During the Great Depression, farmers in the county organized the Farmers Holiday Group, to keep farm products off the market until the desired price was met. A radical group among them abducted Judge Bradley from his court chamber and threatened to hang him in the front of the courthouse. Bradley was freed, but the governor ordered the national guard to Plymouth County and declared a state of emergency, which effectively ended the group.

== Geography ==
According to the United States Census Bureau, the county has a total area of 863.668 square miles (2,236.89 km^{2}), of which 862.828 square miles (2,234.71 km^{2}) is land and 0.840 square miles (2.18 km^{2}) (0.10%) is water. It is the fourth-largest county in Iowa by total area.

=== Adjacent counties ===
- Sioux County (north)
- Cherokee County (east)
- Woodbury County (south)
- Union County, South Dakota (west)

== Transportation ==
=== Major highways ===
- U.S. Highway 75
- Iowa Highway 3
- Iowa Highway 12
- Iowa Highway 60
- Iowa Highway 140

=== Airport ===
Le Mars Municipal Airport is located in Plymouth County, two nautical miles (3.7 km) southwest of the central business district of Le Mars.

== Demographics ==
Historical population
Census	Pop.	Note	%±
1860	148		—
1870	2,199		1,385.8%
1880	8,566		289.5%
1890	19,568		128.4%
1900	22,209		13.5%
1910	23,129		4.1%
1920	23,584		2.0%
1930	24,159		2.4%
1940	23,502		−2.7%
1950	23,252		−1.1%
1960	23,906		2.8%
1970	24,322		1.7%
1980	24,743		1.7%
1990	23,388		−5.5%
2000	24,849		6.2%
2010	24,986		0.6%
2020	25,698		2.8%
2025 (est.)	25,697	▼	0.0%
U.S. Decennial Census; 1790–1960 1900–1990; 1990–2000 2010–2020

As of the second quarter of 2025, the median home value in Plymouth County was $245,947.

As of the 2024 American Community Survey, there are 10,313 estimated households in Plymouth County with an average of 2.46 persons per household. The county has a median household income of $83,251. Approximately 6.9% of the county's population lives at or below the poverty line. Plymouth County has an estimated 67.1% employment rate, with 21.7% of the population holding a bachelor's degree or higher and 94.8% holding a high school diploma. There were 10,891 housing units at an average density of 12.62 per square mile (4.9/km^{2}).

The top five reported languages (people were allowed to report up to two languages, thus the figures will generally add to more than 100%) were English (93.1%), Spanish (4.3%), Indo-European (0.5%), Asian and Pacific Islander (0.7%), and Other (1.5%).

The median age in the county was 41.3 years.

Plymouth County, Iowa – racial and ethnic composition Note: the US Census treats Hispanic/Latino as an ethnic category. This table excludes Latinos from the racial categories and assigns them to a separate category. Hispanics/Latinos may be of any race.
Race / ethnicity (NH = non-Hispanic)	Pop. 1980	Pop. 1990	Pop. 2000	Pop. 2010	Pop. 2020
White alone (NH)	24,532 (99.15%)	23,215 (99.26%)	24,215 (97.45%)	23,782 (95.18%)	22,941 (89.27%)
Black or African American alone (NH)	46 (0.19%)	47 (0.20%)	67 (0.27%)	73 (0.29%)	354 (1.38%)
Native American or Alaska Native alone (NH)	24 (0.10%)	14 (0.06%)	35 (0.14%)	51 (0.20%)	48 (0.19%)
Asian alone (NH)	42 (0.17%)	49 (0.21%)	65 (0.26%)	115 (0.46%)	111 (0.43%)
Pacific Islander alone (NH)	—	—	13 (0.05%)	16 (0.06%)	117 (0.46%)
Other race alone (NH)	21 (0.08%)	5 (0.02%)	12 (0.05%)	5 (0.02%)	54 (0.21%)
Mixed race or multiracial (NH)	—	—	114 (0.46%)	202 (0.81%)	577 (2.25%)
Hispanic or Latino (any race)	78 (0.32%)	58 (0.25%)	328 (1.32%)	742 (2.97%)	1,496 (5.82%)
Total	24,743 (100.00%)	23,388 (100.00%)	24,849 (100.00%)	24,986 (100.00%)	25,698 (100.00%)

=== 2024 estimate ===
As of the 2024 estimate, there were 25,825 people, 10,313 households, and _ families residing in the county. The population density was 11.95 inhabitants per square mile (4.6/km^{2}). There were 10,891 housing units at an average density of 12.62 per square mile (4.9/km^{2}). The racial makeup of the county was 93.2% White (87.1% NH White), 2.6% African American, 1.0% Native American, 0.7% Asian, 1.0% Pacific Islander, _% from some other races and 1.5% from two or more races. Hispanic or Latino people of any race were 7.1% of the population.

=== 2020 census ===
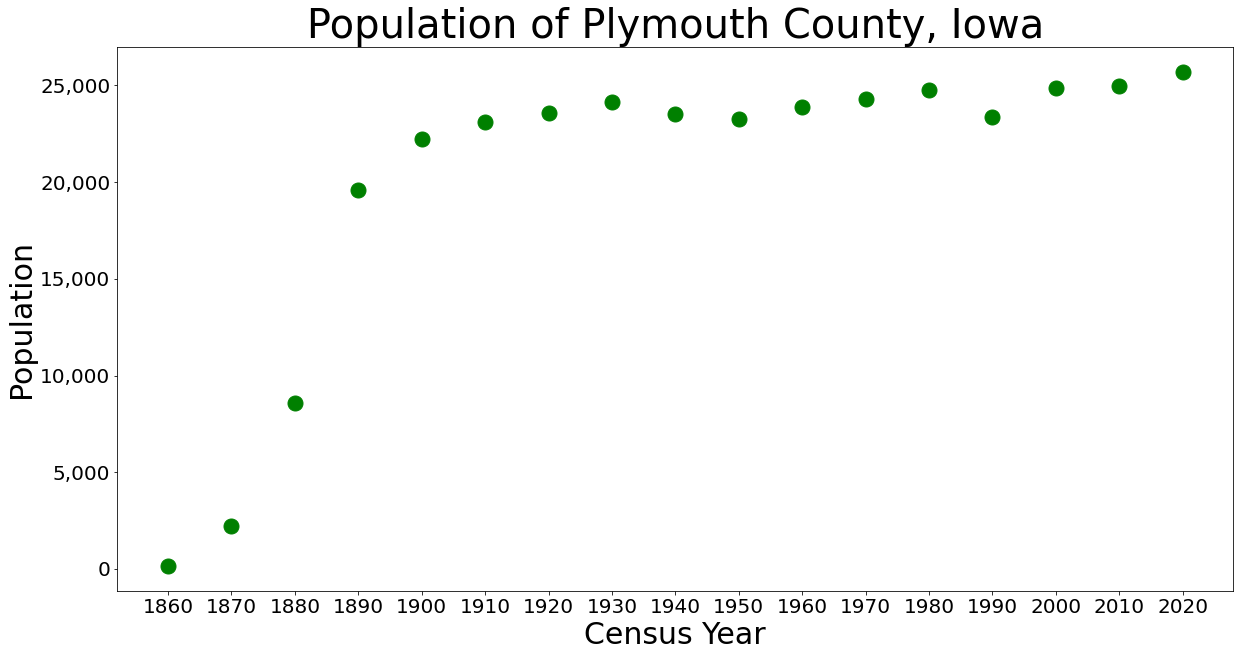
Population of Plymouth County from the U.S. census data

As of the 2020 census, there were 25,698 people, 10,171 households, and 7,048 families residing in the county. The population density was 29.78 inhabitants per square mile (11.5/km^{2}). There were 10,818 housing units at an average density of 12.54 per square mile (4.8/km^{2}). The racial makeup of the county was 90.63% White, 1.39% African American, 0.34% Native American, 0.45% Asian, 0.46% Pacific Islander, 2.55% from some other races and 4.19% from two or more races. Hispanic or Latino people of any race were 5.82% of the population.

The median age was 40.6 years; 25.2% of residents were under the age of 18 and 19.1% of residents were 65 years of age or older. For every 100 females there were 100.5 males, and for every 100 females aged 18 and over there were 98.4 males age 18 and over.

39.5% of residents lived in urban areas, while 60.5% lived in rural areas.

There were 10,171 households in the county, of which 30.6% had children under the age of 18 living in them. Of all households, 56.4% were married-couple households, 17.4% were households with a male householder and no spouse or partner present, and 20.3% were households with a female householder and no spouse or partner present. About 26.3% of all households were made up of individuals and 12.7% had someone living alone who was 65 years of age or older.

There were 10,818 housing units, of which 6.0% were vacant. Among occupied housing units, 77.0% were owner-occupied and 23.0% were renter-occupied. The homeowner vacancy rate was 0.8% and the rental vacancy rate was 6.8%.

=== 2010 census ===
As of the 2010 census, there were 24,986 people, 10,171 households, and _ families residing in the county. The population density was 28.96 inhabitants per square mile (11.2/km^{2}). There were 10,550 housing units at an average density of 12.23 per square mile (4.7/km^{2}). The racial makeup of the county was 96.39% White, 0.30% African American, 0.28% Native American, 0.47% Asian, 0.06% Pacific Islander, 1.48% from some other races and 1.00% from two or more races. Hispanic or Latino people of any race were 2.97% of the population.

=== 2000 census ===
As of the 2000 census, there were 24,849 people, 9,372 households, and 6,804 families residing in the county. The population density was 28.80 inhabitants per square mile (11.1/km^{2}). There were 9,880 housing units at an average density of 11.45 per square mile (4.4/km^{2}). The racial makeup of the county was 98.16% White, 0.29% African American, 0.14% Native American, 0.27% Asian, 0.06% Pacific Islander, 0.46% from some other races and 0.62% from two or more races. Hispanic or Latino people of any race were 1.32% of the population.

There were 9,372 households 35.70% had children under the age of 18 living with them, 63.30% were married couples living together, 6.20% had a female householder with no husband present, and 27.40% were non-families. 24.00% of households were one person and 12.00% were one person aged 65 or older. The average household size was 2.61 and the average family size was 3.12.

The age distribution was 28.30% under the age of 18, 7.20% from 18 to 24, 26.40% from 25 to 44, 22.00% from 45 to 64, and 16.00% 65 or older. The median age was 38 years. For every 100 females there were 98.80 males. For every 100 females age 18 and over, there were 95.70 males.

The median household income was $41,638 and the median family income was $50,009. Males had a median income of $33,566 versus $22,558 for females. The per capita income for the county was $19,442. About 4.40% of families and 6.00% of the population were below the poverty line, including 6.70% of those under age 18 and 6.40% of those age 65 or over.

== Points of interest ==
The Pappas Telecasting Tower, with a height of 603.5 metres (1,980 ft), is one of the tallest masts in the world.

== Notable people ==
- William G. Kirchner, Minnesota state legislator and banker
- Ralph Klemme, Iowa state legislator and farmer
- Jim Nicholson, Former Secretary of Veterans Affairs, Republican National Chairman and U.S. Ambassador to the Vatican
- Johnny Niggeling, Major league baseball pitcher
- Paul Rust, actor and comedian
- Thomas Starzl, innovator in organ transplant surgery
- Isaac S. Struble, Congressman (1883–1891) after whom Struble is named
- William Garner Waddel, South Dakota State Senator

== Communities ==
=== Cities ===
- Akron
- Brunsville
- Craig
- Hinton
- Kingsley
- Le Mars
- Merrill
- Oyens
- Remsen
- Sioux City (mostly in Woodbury County)
- Struble
- Westfield

=== Unincorporated communities ===
- Adaville
- Brookdale
- Crathorne
- Ellendale
- James
- Mammen
- Melbourne
- Millnerville
- Neptune
- O'Leary
- Potosia
- Ruble
- Seney
- Union Center
- West Le Mars
- Wren
- Yeomans

=== Population ranking ===
The population ranking of the following table is based on the 2020 census of Plymouth County.

† county seat

Rank	City/Town/etc.	Municipal type	Population (2020 Census)	Population (2024 Estimate)
1	† Le Mars	City	10,571	10,674
2	Remsen	City	1,678	1,681
3	Akron	City	1,558	1,545
4	Kingsley	City	1,396	1,394
5	Hinton	City	935	959
6	Merrill	City	717	713
7	Brunsville	City	129	128
8	Westfield	City	123	121
9	Oyens	City	92	88
10	Craig	City	79	78
11	Struble	City	67	72
12	Sioux City (almost entirely in Woodbury County)	City	6 (85,797 total)	6 (86,875 total)

== Politics ==
Like most of Northwest Iowa, Plymouth County is a Republican Party stronghold. Lyndon B. Johnson is the last Democrat to win the county in a presidential election, and in elections from 1896 on it has only been won by a Democrat nationally four other times.

United States presidential election results for Plymouth County, Iowa
Year	Republican		Democratic		Third party(ies)	
Year	No.	%	No.	%	No.	%
1896	2,623	51.40%	2,392	46.87%	88	1.72%
1900	2,712	53.03%	2,307	45.11%	95	1.86%
1904	2,905	61.47%	1,663	35.19%	158	3.34%
1908	2,622	53.18%	2,168	43.98%	140	2.84%
1912	825	16.69%	2,038	41.24%	2,079	42.07%
1916	2,666	53.14%	2,258	45.01%	93	1.85%
1920	6,090	76.16%	1,801	22.52%	105	1.31%
1924	3,803	42.09%	1,605	17.76%	3,628	40.15%
1928	4,848	48.98%	5,015	50.67%	34	0.34%
1932	2,888	27.34%	7,565	71.62%	110	1.04%
1936	4,133	36.11%	5,994	52.37%	1,318	11.52%
1940	7,725	66.72%	3,831	33.09%	23	0.20%
1944	6,085	67.04%	2,970	32.72%	21	0.23%
1948	5,002	53.12%	4,339	46.08%	75	0.80%
1952	8,140	74.29%	2,768	25.26%	49	0.45%
1956	7,246	67.42%	3,502	32.58%	0	0.00%
1960	6,432	57.93%	4,671	42.07%	0	0.00%
1964	4,920	46.36%	5,691	53.62%	2	0.02%
1968	6,236	62.13%	3,234	32.22%	567	5.65%
1972	6,339	60.57%	4,033	38.53%	94	0.90%
1976	5,590	55.81%	4,284	42.77%	142	1.42%
1980	6,515	62.97%	2,965	28.66%	866	8.37%
1984	6,482	64.65%	3,464	34.55%	81	0.81%
1988	5,316	55.33%	4,220	43.93%	71	0.74%
1992	5,196	49.56%	3,171	30.25%	2,117	20.19%
1996	5,117	51.40%	3,745	37.62%	1,094	10.99%
2000	6,189	61.17%	3,499	34.58%	430	4.25%
2004	7,810	63.90%	4,278	35.00%	134	1.10%
2008	7,765	62.05%	4,629	36.99%	121	0.97%
2012	8,597	66.39%	4,164	32.15%	189	1.46%
2016	9,680	73.39%	2,885	21.87%	625	4.74%
2020	10,492	73.95%	3,494	24.63%	202	1.42%
2024	10,661	76.31%	3,104	22.22%	206	1.47%

=== Political Subdivisions ===
- America
- Elgin
- Elkhorn
- Fredonia
- Garfield
- Grant
- Hancock
- Henry
- Hungerford
- Johnson
- Liberty
- Lincoln
- Marion
- Meadow
- Perry
- Plymouth
- Portland
- Preston
- Remsen
- Sioux
- Stanton
- Union
- Washington
- Westfield

== Education ==
School districts include:

- Akron–Westfield Community School District, Akron
- Hinton Community School District, Hinton
- Kingsley–Pierson Community School District, Kingsley
- Lawton–Bronson Community School District, Lawton
- Le Mars Community School District, Le Mars
- Marcus-Meriden-Cleghorn Community School District, Marcus
- Remsen Union Community School District, Remsen
- Sioux City Community School District, Sioux City
- West Sioux Community School District, Hawarden

== See also ==
- Plymouth County Courthouse
- National Register of Historic Places listings in Plymouth County, Iowa
- Plymouth Roller Milling Company
- Damnation (TV series)
