= Elkhorn Township, Plymouth County, Iowa =

Township in Plymouth County, Iowa

Coordinates: 42°36′18″N 96°02′13″W

Elkhorn Township is a township in Plymouth County, Iowa in the United States. The township is named after ().

The elevation of Elkhorn Township is listed as 1362 feet above mean sea level.
