= Plymouth County Courthouse (Iowa) =

- U.S. National Register of Historic Places
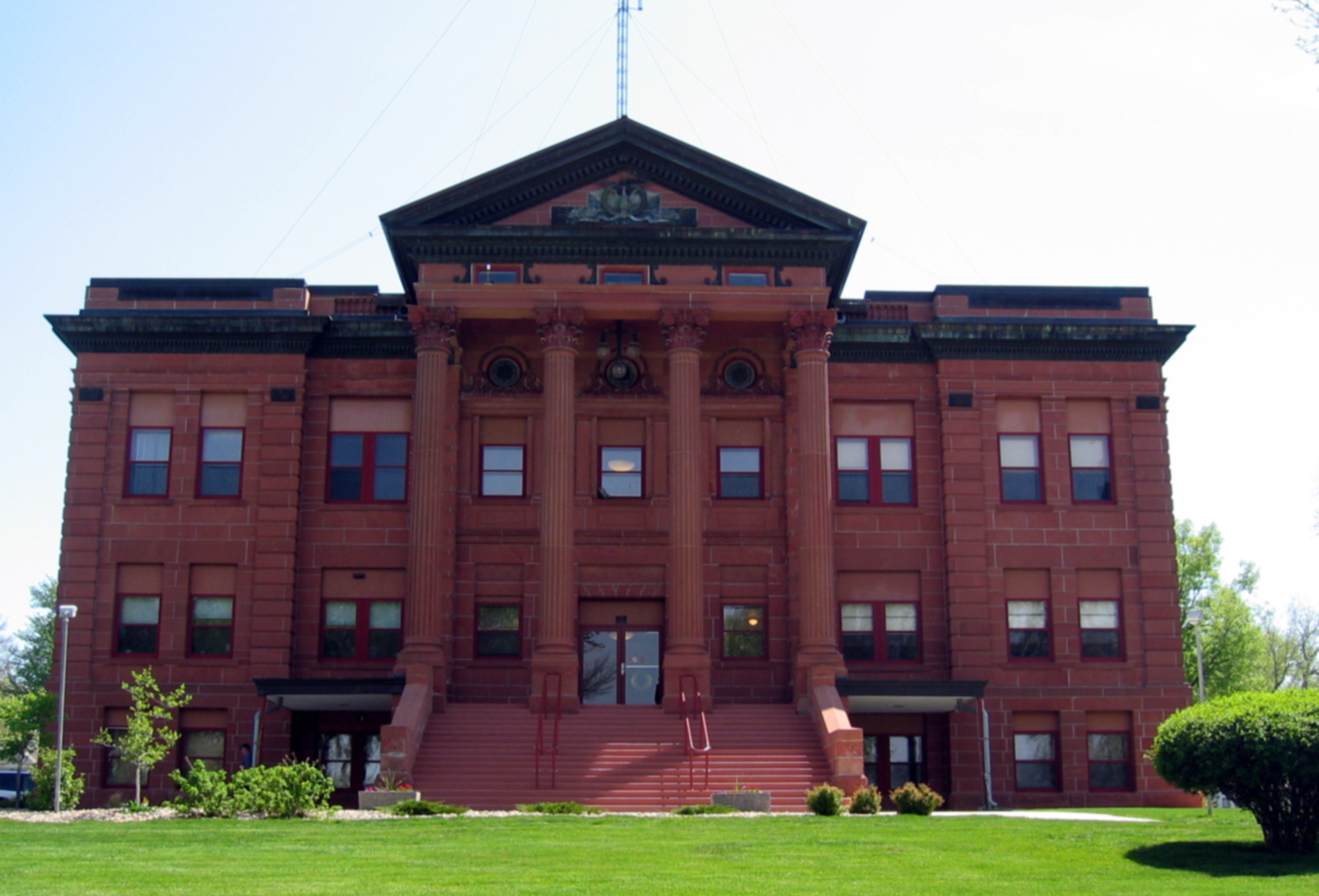

- Location within Iowa Location within the United States
- Interactive map showing the location for Plymouth County Courthouse
- Location: E. 3rd Ave. Le Mars, Iowa
- Coordinates: 42°47′23.8″N 96°09′41.6″W
- Built: 1902
- Built by: Emil Miller
- Architect: Kinney & Detweiler
- MPS: County Courthouses in Iowa TR
- NRHP reference No.: 81000263
- Added to NRHP: July 2, 1981

The Plymouth County Courthouse located in Le Mars, Iowa, United States, was built in 1891. It was listed on the National Register of Historic Places in 1981 as a part of the County Courthouses in Iowa Thematic Resource. The courthouse is the fourth building the county has used for court functions and county administration.

== History ==
The county's first courthouse was located in Melbourne and part of the building housed a grocery store. The county seat was moved to Le Mars in 1872 after its citizens offered to build a new courthouse. It served the county for two years when another courthouse was built for $3,000. The present courthouse replaced it in 1902 after a $72,000 bond referendum passed. It was designed by Minneapolis architectural firm of Kinney & Detweiler and built by a local contractor Emil Miller.

The courthouse was the scene of protests by local farmers during the Great Depression. These included a milk strike, activities by the Farmers Holiday Association, and protests against farm foreclosures in 1932 and 1933. One of the more dramatic events was when Judge C.C. Bradley was dragged from his bench. He was physically and verbally abused, and they attempted to coerce him to agree to the constitutionality of the Debtor Relief Law by threatening him with lynching.

== Architecture ==
The exterior is constructed in red sandstone, but unlike other courthouses in Iowa that were constructed of this material, the sandstone is smoothly-dressed much as Bedford stone. The building features a large pedimented tetrastyle portico with columns in the Composite order. The building was originally capped by a large cupola that was removed in 1932. The interior features ceramic tile floors in the public areas, and past a wide column screen is a double wooden staircase.
