= Hungerford Township, Plymouth County, Iowa =

Township in Plymouth County, Iowa

Coordinates: 42°36′19″N 96°16′22″W

Hungerford Township is a township in Plymouth County, Iowa in the United States. The township probably is named after Ezra Styles Hungerford who was Township supervisor for many years during early settlement of the area.

The elevation of Hungerford Township is listed as 1234 feet above mean sea level.
