= Garfield Township, Plymouth County, Iowa =

Township in Plymouth County, Iowa

Coordinates: 42.605°N 95.919°W

Garfield Township is a township in Plymouth County, Iowa in the United States that split from Elkhorn Township on September 6, 1882. The township is named after President James A. Garfield. Kingsley, Iowa is located within the township.
