= Remsen Township, Plymouth County, Iowa =

Township in Plymouth County, Iowa

Coordinates: 42°46′44″N 95°55′07″W

Remsen Township is a township in Plymouth County, Iowa in the United States.

The elevation of Remsen Township is listed as 1440 feet above mean sea level.
