= Marion Township, Plymouth County, Iowa =

Township in Plymouth County, Iowa

Coordinates: 42°46′44″N 96°02′13″W

Marion Township is a township in Plymouth County, Iowa in the United States. The township is named after ().

The elevation of Marion Township is listed as 1414 feet above mean sea level.
