= Le Mars, Iowa =

- City
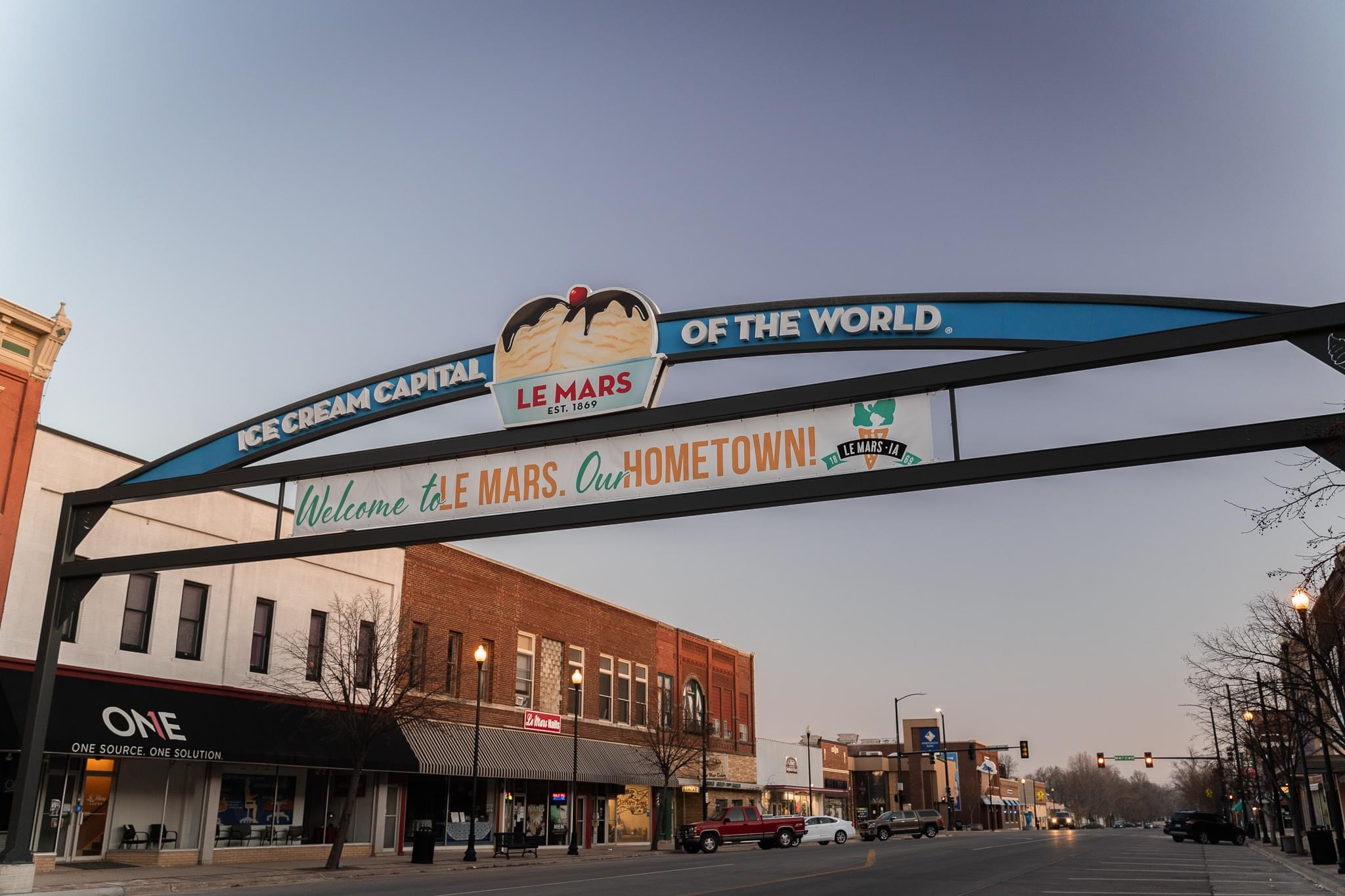
- Downtown Le Mars
- Nickname: "Ice Cream Capital Of The World"
- Location of Le Mars within Plymouth County and Iowa

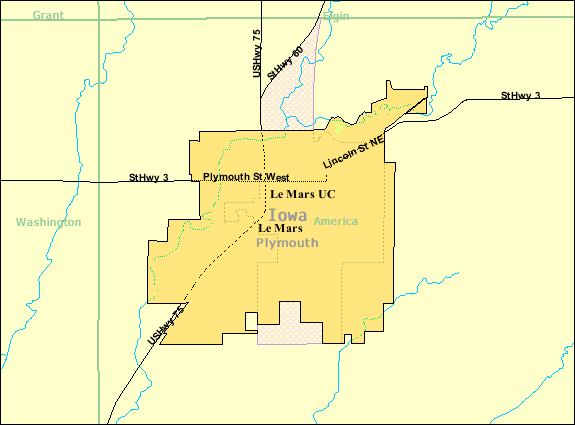
- U.S. Census Map

- Location within Iowa Location within the United States
- Coordinates: 42°46′28″N 96°11′23″W
- Country: USA
- State: Iowa
- County: Plymouth

Government
  - Type: Mayor-council

Area
  - Total: 8.55 sq mi (22.14 km^{2})
  - Land: 8.54 sq mi (22.12 km^{2})
  - Water: 0.012 sq mi (0.03 km^{2})
- Elevation: 1,237 ft (377 m)

Population (2020)
  - Total: 10,571
  - Density: 1,238/sq mi (478.1/km^{2})
- Time zone: UTC-6 (Central (CST))
  - Summer (DST): UTC-5 (CDT)
- ZIP code: 51031
- Area code: 712
- FIPS code: 19-44400
- GNIS feature ID: 2395655
- Website: lemarsiowa.com

Le Mars /ləˈmɑːrz/ is a city and the county seat of Plymouth County, Iowa, United States. It is located on the Floyd River northeast of Sioux City. The population was 10,571 at the time of the 2020 census. Le Mars is located within America Township and is part of the Sioux City metropolitan area.

== History ==
Le Mars is the home of Wells Enterprises, Inc., world's largest producer of ice cream novelties in one location and claims to be the "Ice Cream Capital of the World."

In 1866, Benjamin F. Betsworth was the first settler in the town which came to be known as Le Mars; he homesteaded on the Floyd River and built the town's first schoolhouse. Le Mars was platted three years later but no lots were sold until the Iowa Falls and Sioux City Railroad Company, a subsidiary of the Iowa Falls and Sioux City Railroad (later part of the Illinois Central Railroad), completed its trackage from Le Mars southwardly to Sioux City in 1870.

Railroad magnate John I. Blair hosted an excursion to the new town, which was then called St. Paul Junction because of its 1871 connection to St. Paul on the nascent Sioux City & St. Paul Railroad. Blair asked the women in the party to name the town, and they submitted an acronym based upon their first names' initials: Lucy Ford and Laura Walker, Ellen Cleghorn or Elizabeth Underhill, Martha Weare and Mary Weare, Adeline Swain, Rebecca Smith and Sarah Reynolds. (Note that some letters represent more than one person.) There was some subsequent uncertainty about who the women of the acronym actually were. For example, the city's web page contains a somewhat different list.

In 1885, Frederick Brooke Close, a young Englishman who had passed up attending Cambridge University to live in Iowa, founded the Northwestern Polo League in Le Mars. Close and his two brothers founded a colony of affluent young Englishmen (particularly the second sons of wealthy families) to learn farm management on the American prairie. Hundreds of educated British youths lived in Le Mars during this period and founded social clubs, pubs, and sports clubs catering to their interests. Financial difficulties, harsh weather, lack of interest in farming, and isolation led to the colony's failure and the British returned to their home country or other parts of the Empire in the early 1890s.

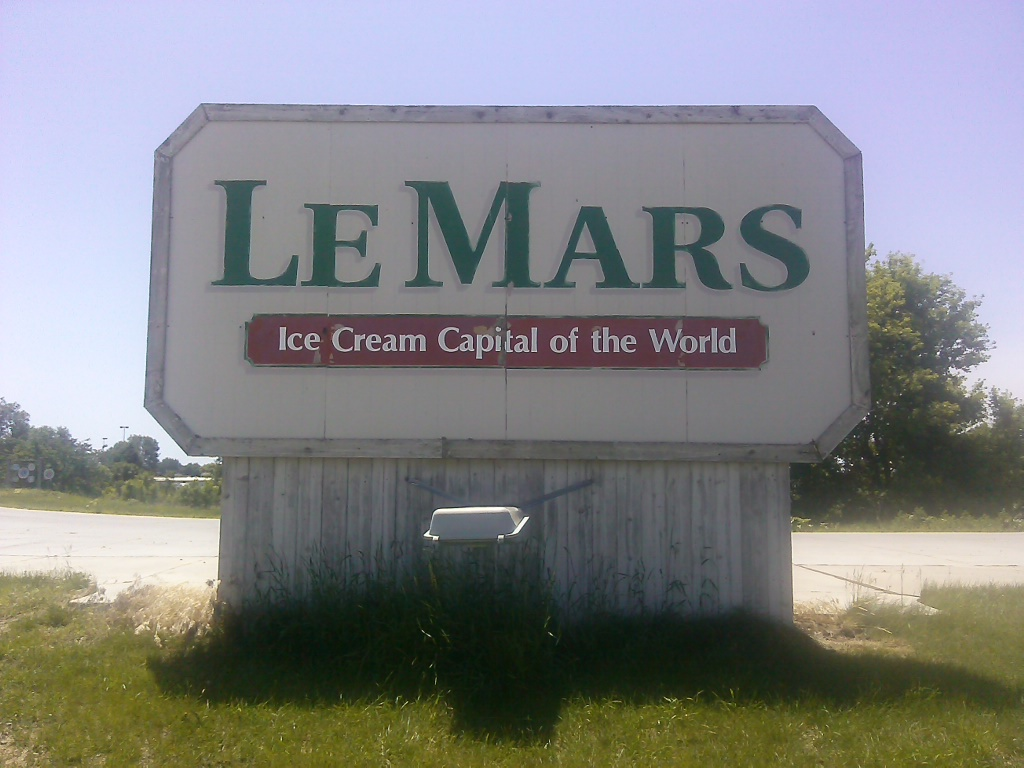
Entrance sign to Le Mars "Ice Cream Capital of the World"

During the Great Depression in 1933, at a time when banks were foreclosing on many farmers, Le Mars caught the attention of the nation when "over five hundred farmers crowded the court room in Le Mars", according to an account by historian Arthur Schlesinger, Jr. The farmers were there to demand that Judge Charles C. Bradley suspend foreclosure proceedings until recently passed laws could be considered. Judge Bradley refused. One farmer remarked that the court room wasn't his alone, that farmers had paid for it with their taxes. The crowd rushed the judge, slapped him, and placed a rope around his neck and a hub cap on his head. They did not, however lynch him.

President George W. Bush came to Le Mars on November 3, 2006, to campaign for Jim Nussle, then candidate for Iowa governor, as well as Rep. Steve King. He spoke at Le Mars Community High School to a crowd of over 2500 people. Le Mars is a popular stop for presidential candidates as they make their way across caucus-famous Iowa, and has been visited by nearly every presidential candidate over the past several elections including Joe Biden, Barack Obama, Hillary Clinton, Mitt Romney, John McCain, etc.

=== Wells Enterprises ===
In 1925, Fred H. Wells Jr. and his sons had opened an ice cream manufacturing plant there. However, the plant (and the Wells name) was purchased by Fairmount Ice Cream in 1928. In 1935, Fred and his sons sought to begin selling ice cream again, but could no longer use their name. They, therefore, sponsored a “Name That Ice Cream” contest in the Sioux City Journal. The winner of the $25 prize suggested "Blue Bunny" because his son had enjoyed seeing blue bunnies in department store windows at Easter. In 2022, the company Ferrero Rocher purchased Wells Enterprise.

Dominating the skyline of present-day Le Mars is Wells' Blue Bunny Dairy's 900,000-square-foot (84,000 m^{2}) plant with a 12-story tall refrigeration tower called the "South Ice Cream Plant" – so-named because it is on the south side of town. As of 2005, the plant employed 1,000 and produces 75 million gallons of frozen treats, the milk coming mainly coming from three large Iowa dairy farms. The size of this plant has led to speculation that the company is the world's largest family-owned and managed dairy processor and the world's largest manufacturer of ice cream in one location, with Le Mars claiming to be the "Ice Cream Capital of the World".

Wells is best known for its various sweet products, including Blue Bunny, Bomb Pop, Blue Ribbon, and Chilly Cow. To showcase its sweet treats, Le Mars has an ice cream parlor, which was remodeled in 2019, and includes an old-fashioned ice cream serving station, museum displays, roof-top seating, and gift shop. The ice cream parlor in Le Mars is one of the largest tourist attractions in the state of Iowa. Le Mars hosts an annual celebration "Ice Cream Days" every year in late June which includes many activities such as ice cream socials, concerts, art exhibitions, parades, and more.

== Geography ==
According to the United States Census Bureau, the city has a total area of 8.55 square miles (22.14 km^{2}), of which 8.54 square miles (22.12 km^{2}) is land and 0.01 square miles (0.03 km^{2}) is water.

=== Climate ===
Climate data for Le Mars, Iowa (1991−2020 normals, extremes 1896−present)
Month	Jan	Feb	Mar	Apr	May	Jun	Jul	Aug	Sep	Oct	Nov	Dec	Year
Record high °F (°C)	68 (20)	70 (21)	88 (31)	96 (36)	108 (42)	106 (41)	111 (44)	108 (42)	103 (39)	97 (36)	80 (27)	68 (20)	111 (44)
Mean maximum °F (°C)	48.6 (9.2)	54.8 (12.7)	72.5 (22.5)	83.6 (28.7)	91.3 (32.9)	94.1 (34.5)	93.4 (34.1)	92.4 (33.6)	89.8 (32.1)	84.7 (29.3)	67.5 (19.7)	52.0 (11.1)	96.5 (35.8)
Mean daily maximum °F (°C)	27.2 (−2.7)	32.2 (0.1)	45.9 (7.7)	59.9 (15.5)	71.7 (22.1)	81.3 (27.4)	84.5 (29.2)	82.0 (27.8)	75.8 (24.3)	62.5 (16.9)	45.7 (7.6)	32.0 (0.0)	58.4 (14.7)
Daily mean °F (°C)	17.3 (−8.2)	21.8 (−5.7)	34.5 (1.4)	47.0 (8.3)	59.3 (15.2)	69.8 (21.0)	73.1 (22.8)	70.5 (21.4)	62.7 (17.1)	49.7 (9.8)	34.6 (1.4)	22.4 (−5.3)	46.9 (8.3)
Mean daily minimum °F (°C)	7.4 (−13.7)	11.4 (−11.4)	23.1 (−4.9)	34.2 (1.2)	47.0 (8.3)	58.3 (14.6)	61.7 (16.5)	59.0 (15.0)	49.6 (9.8)	36.9 (2.7)	23.5 (−4.7)	12.9 (−10.6)	35.4 (1.9)
Mean minimum °F (°C)	−14.7 (−25.9)	−8.9 (−22.7)	2.0 (−16.7)	19.5 (−6.9)	33.5 (0.8)	47.1 (8.4)	50.9 (10.5)	48.5 (9.2)	34.6 (1.4)	21.6 (−5.8)	6.3 (−14.3)	−8.2 (−22.3)	−18.0 (−27.8)
Record low °F (°C)	−37 (−38)	−35 (−37)	−26 (−32)	−2 (−19)	17 (−8)	33 (1)	38 (3)	35 (2)	22 (−6)	−7 (−22)	−24 (−31)	−33 (−36)	−37 (−38)
Average precipitation inches (mm)	0.72 (18)	0.87 (22)	1.85 (47)	3.07 (78)	3.90 (99)	4.64 (118)	3.11 (79)	3.95 (100)	3.14 (80)	2.40 (61)	1.30 (33)	1.04 (26)	29.99 (762)
Average snowfall inches (cm)	7.8 (20)	7.5 (19)	4.6 (12)	1.9 (4.8)	0.1 (0.25)	0.0 (0.0)	0.0 (0.0)	0.0 (0.0)	0.0 (0.0)	0.4 (1.0)	2.6 (6.6)	6.0 (15)	30.9 (78)
Average precipitation days (≥ 0.01 in)	4.0	4.5	5.5	7.8	10.4	9.7	6.7	7.5	6.9	6.4	3.6	4.2	77.2
Average snowy days (≥ 0.1 in)	3.6	3.3	2.1	0.7	0.0	0.0	0.0	0.0	0.0	0.4	1.3	3.4	14.8
Source: NOAA

== Demographics ==
Historical population
Census	Pop.	Note	%±
1890	4,036		—
1900	4,146		2.7%
1910	4,157		0.3%
1920	4,683		12.7%
1930	4,788		2.2%
1940	5,353		11.8%
1950	5,844		9.2%
1960	6,767		15.8%
1970	8,159		20.6%
1980	8,276		1.4%
1990	8,454		2.2%
2000	9,237		9.3%
2010	9,826		6.4%
2020	10,571		7.6%
U.S. Decennial Census

Le Mars is a part of the Sioux City metropolitan area.

=== 2020 census ===
As of the 2020 census, Le Mars had a population of 10,571. The median age was 38.1 years. 26.3% of residents were under the age of 18 and 16.9% of residents were 65 years of age or older. For every 100 females there were 97.7 males, and for every 100 females age 18 and over there were 92.7 males age 18 and over.

95.8% of residents lived in urban areas, while 4.2% lived in rural areas.

There were 4,296 households and 2,768 families in Le Mars. Of all households, 31.0% had children under the age of 18 living in them, 49.0% were married-couple households, 6.9% were cohabitating-couple households, 17.9% were households with a male householder and no spouse or partner present, and 26.2% were households with a female householder and no spouse or partner present. Non-family households accounted for 35.6% of all households. About 30.2% of all households were made up of individuals and 13.4% had someone living alone who was 65 years of age or older.

There were 4,521 housing units, of which 5.0% were vacant. The homeowner vacancy rate was 0.8% and the rental vacancy rate was 5.3%.

Racial composition as of the 2020 census
Race	Number	Percent
White	9,030	85.4%
Black or African American	307	2.9%
American Indian and Alaska Native	37	0.4%
Asian	90	0.9%
Native Hawaiian and Other Pacific Islander	77	0.7%
Some other race	497	4.7%
Two or more races	533	5.0%
Hispanic or Latino (of any race)	1,008	9.5%

=== 2010 census ===
As of the 2010 census, there were 9,826 people, 4,013 households, and 2,593 families residing in the city. The population density was 1,096.7 inhabitants per square mile (423.4/km^{2}). There were 4,220 housing units at an average density of 471.0 per square mile (181.9/km^{2}). The racial makeup of the city was 92.5% White, 0.5% African American, 0.3% Native American, 0.7% Asian, 2.9% from other races, and 1.3% from two or more races. Hispanic or Latino of any race were 5.4% of the population.

There were 4,013 households, of which 31.8% had children under the age of 18 living with them, 52.3% were married couples living together, 8.5% had a female householder with no husband present, 3.9% had a male householder with no wife present, and 35.4% were non-families. 30.6% of all households were made up of individuals, and 13.7% had someone living alone who was 65 years of age or older. The average household size was 2.39 and the average family size was 3.00.

The median age in the city was 39.2 years. 25.9% of residents were under the age of 18; 7.3% were between the ages of 18 and 24; 23.5% were from 25 to 44; 26.3% were from 45 to 64; and 16.8% were 65 years of age or older. The gender makeup of the city was 48.4% male and 51.6% female.

=== 2000 census ===
As of the census of 2000, there were 9,237 people, 3,640 households, and 2,453 families residing in the city. The population density was 1,356.9 inhabitants per square mile (523.9/km^{2}). There were 3,818 housing units at an average density of 560.9 per square mile (216.6/km^{2}). The racial makeup of the city was 97.24% White, 0.45% African American, 0.16% Native American, 0.30% Asian, 0.09% Pacific Islander, 0.94% from other races, and 0.81% from two or more races. Hispanic or Latino of any race were 2.44% of the population.

There were 3,640 households, out of which 34.2% had children under the age of 18 living with them, 56.0% were married couples living together, 8.4% had a female householder with no husband present, and 32.6% were non-families. 28.7% of all households were made up of individuals, and 13.7% had someone living alone who was 65 years of age or older. The average household size was 2.46 and the average family size was 3.05.

Age spread: 27.2% under the age of 18, 8.3% from 18 to 24, 27.6% from 25 to 44, 20.3% from 45 to 64, and 16.6% who were 65 years of age or older. The median age was 37 years. For every 100 females, there were 92.3 males. For every 100 females age 18 and over, there were 87.8 males.

The median income for a household in the city was $38,892, and the median income for a family was $47,409. Males had a median income of $35,936 versus $21,757 for females. The per capita income for the city was $19,598. About 4.5% of families and 6.2% of the population were below the poverty line, including 7.0% of those under age 18 and 6.7% of those age 65 or over.

== Education ==
Le Mars is home to two educational institutions, one public and one private.

=== Le Mars Community School District ===
Le Mars Community School District is the public school serving over 2,000 students grades PK–12. Le Mars Community, known locally as "Community", has a mascot of a bulldog. Le Mars was a member of the Lakes Conference until July 2019, when it switched to the Missouri River Conference.

==== Elementary ====
- Clark Elementary School (K–5)
- Franklin Elementary School (K–5)
- Kluckhohn Elementary School (K–5)

==== Middle school ====
- Le Mars Community Middle School (6–8)

==== High school ====
- Le Mars Community High School (9–12)

==== Alternative education ====
- Individualized Learning Center

=== Gehlen Catholic Schools ===
Gehlen Catholic is a private school associated with the Roman Catholic Diocese of Sioux City serving over 540 students in grades PK–12. Gehlen Catholic's mascot is a jay. Gehlen Catholic is a member of the War Eagle Conference.

==== Elementary ====
- Gehlen Catholic Elementary School

==== Middle School ====
- Gehlen Catholic Middle School

==== High school ====
- Gehlen Catholic High School

=== Westmar University ===
Westmar University was a private four-year liberal arts college in Le Mars. It permanently closed on November 21, 1997.

== Transportation ==
=== Airports ===
Le Mars Municipal Airport is owned by the city of Le Mars and located two nautical miles (3.7 km) southwest of its central business district.

=== Major roads ===
- U.S. Route 75 runs north–south through the city of Le Mars.
- Iowa State Highway 3 runs east–west through the city of Le Mars.
- Iowa State Highway 60 begins on the north edge of Le Mars and continues northeast to the Minnesota border.

== Notable places ==
- Plymouth County Courthouse
- St. George's Episcopal Church
- Tonsfeldt Round Barn, listed on the National Register of Historic Places
- Westmar University A private four-year liberal arts college that permanently closed on November 21, 1997.
- Wells Enterprises
- Le Mars Public Library
- Plymouth Roller Milling Company
- Archie's Waeside is a steakhouse restaurant known for its dry-aged beef steaks. Archie's was named the 2nd best steak house in America by Rachel Ray Magazine. In 2015, Archie's Waeside was awarded the James Beard Foundation's 2015 America's Classics Awards.
- The Wells Visitor Center and Ice Cream Parlor is located in downtown Le Mars. It was remodeled inside and out in 2018–2019. It offers an old-fashioned serving station, seating, interactive displays, roof-top seating, party room, and gift shop.
- Bob's Drive Inn is a popular local restaurant serving classic taverns and hotdogs, among other iconic "drive in" items. Bob's Drive Inn has won "Best Hot Dog in Iowa" by People's Magazine.

== Notable people ==
- Clarence E. Coe, pioneer of Palms, California and member of the Los Angeles, California, City Council, born in Le Mars
- Bruce Dreckman, umpire in Major League Baseball
- Albert W. Durley, Wisconsin State Assemblyman and lawyer
- Harry Gaspar, major league baseball pitcher. Operated Gaspar Studio photography in Le Mars
- Loyal M. Haynes, Brigadier General in U.S. Army, commanding general of 2nd Division Artillery Unit in Korean War.
- John Gregory Kelly, Roman Catholic bishop
- Clyde Kluckhohn, Harvard professor in Social Anthropology, born in Le Mars
- Keith Knudsen, drummer for the Doobie Brothers
- Jim Nicholson, former Secretary of Veteran Affairs and Republican Party Chairman
- Donald Paulin, Iowa state legislator, mayor of Le Mars, and businessman
- Nancy Jo Powell, former United States ambassador
- Paul Rust, star of I Love You, Beth Cooper and Love
- Roger C. Schultz, United States Army Lieutenant General and Director of the Army National Guard
- John Spenkelink, first person involuntarily executed in the United States after the re-introduction of the death penalty
- Charles A. Spring, influential Presbyterian, son of Revolutionary War chaplain Samuel Spring
- Roman Frederick Starzl, science fiction author and newspaper publisher
- Thomas Starzl, innovator in organ transplant surgery
- Isaac S. Struble, congressman and namesake of Struble, Iowa

== See also ==
- Damnation (TV series)
