= Iowa Highway 7 (1957–1968) =

State highway in Iowa, United States

Iowa Highway 7
- Iowa 7 highlighted in red over a modern map

Route information
- Maintained by Iowa State Highway Commission
- Length: 22.09 mi (35.55 km)
- Existed: 1957–1968

Major junctions
- South end: I-29 / US 20 / US 77 in Sioux City
- North end: Iowa 3 west of Le Mars

Location
- Country: United States
- State: Iowa
- Counties: Woodbury; Plymouth

Highway system
- Iowa Primary Highway System; Interstate; US; State; Secondary; Scenic
| ← Iowa 7 | → Iowa 7 |

Iowa Highway 7 (Iowa 7) was a state highway that existed from 1957 to 1968. It began at the interchange between Interstate 29 (I-29), U.S. Highway 20, and U.S. Highway 77 (US 20 and US 77) in Sioux City and traveled north to end at Iowa 3 west of Le Mars. The route of Iowa 7 was an original primary road in 1920, but then it was known as Primary Road No. 29 (No. 29) and later Iowa 29. When I-29 was designated to come through Iowa in the 1950s, Iowa 29 was renumbered Iowa 7. Through Sioux City, the highway was well traveled, especially near I-29 and the downtown area; the inverse was true at the rural northern end. Subsequently, Iowa 7 was removed from the primary highway system in 1968.

== Route description ==
Iowa 7 began at the cloverleaf interchange between I-29 and two U.S. Highways – US 20 and US 77 in Sioux City. US 20 and US 77 traveled south from the interchange over the Pacific Shoreline Bridge into Nebraska. The two highways went in separate directions along I-29 – US 20 follow southbound I-29 and US 77 followed northbound I-29. Iowa 7 formed the northern leg of the interchange. It traveled into the western edge of downtown Sioux City along Wesley Way and Perry Street before it turned to the northwest along 7th Street. It followed 7th for a few blocks and turned northeast onto Otoe Street, which became Hamilton Street shortly thereafter. From here, Iowa 7 runs along Hamilton Street for about two-thirds mile (1,100 m) before a series of curves to the east and then back to the north took the highway out of the city. At the Woodbury–Plymouth county line, the highway became increasingly rural in character. The highway continued gradually curving to the east as it headed north while following Perry Creek. At County Road L (CR L, now CR C60) which connected to US 75 in Hinton, Iowa 7 took a due north–south path for the rest of its routing. It ended at a T-intersection with Iowa 3 at roughly the midpoint between Alton to the west and Le Mars to the east.

== History ==
When the Iowa Primary Road System was created in 1920, No. 29 was designated from downtown Sioux City north to No. 27, which connected Le Mars and Akron. No. 29 began on Nebraska Street in downtown Sioux City and headed north with No. 12. At 27th Street, the routes turned west and then shortly thereafter turned to the northwest along Stone Park Boulevard. The routes split as No. 29 turned north onto McDonald Street and No. 12 continued on Stone Park Boulevard. No. 29 followed McDonald Street for a short way until it became Perry Creek Road, which curved east and north out of Sioux City. The northern end of the highway was one mile (1.6 km) north of its final end at No. 27. By 1925, the highway was paved within Woodbury County, but was a gravel road Plymouth County. The next year, as the U.S. Highway System was created, No. 29 was renamed Iowa 29; no routing changes occurred. In order to remove traffic from Iowa 12 and Iowa 29 from the residential neighborhoods along Nebraska Street north of downtown Sioux City, the two highways were rerouted to the west. The highways zigzagged along city streets while following Perry Creek. The new routing joined the former routing at Stone Park Boulevard in the northern part of town.

By mid-1932, the Plymouth County portion of Iowa 29 had been paved with a bituminous surface. The route remained the same for over 20 years. At the northern end, Iowa 27 was absorbed into Iowa 5 in 1929. In 1953, the Iowa State Highway Commission heard proposals and ultimately decided to reroute Iowa 3 and Iowa 5 east of Iowa 29 in Plymouth County. After some delays, the paving project was let in August 1954 and was completed by the end of the year. In 1955, increasing traffic was causing civic leaders to consider highway widening projects for five state highways in Sioux City, Iowa 29 included. The proposal for Iowa 29 called for moving the highway to the western side of Perry Creek along Center Street to West 14th Street where it would reconnect to the present route. Ultimately, the city council decided in February 1956 to widen Hamilton and Otoe streets which would move Iowa 29 one block to the east. The straightened route opened in July 1957.

Later in 1957, as I-29 was in the planning stages, the Iowa State Highway Commission renumbered Iowa 29 to Iowa 7. The change was made in order to not duplicate route numbers. In 1960, the many street names of Sioux City north of 7th Street that carried Iowa 7–Otoe Street, Hamilton Street, Dearborn Street, and Perry Creek Road–were renamed Hamilton Boulevard. In two separate meetings, Woodbury and Plymouth county officials talked to Iowa State Highway Commission officials about taking over the highway in each county. In Plymouth County, the annual average daily traffic in 1965 was 418 vehicles, which was markedly lower than the 5803 vehicles in Woodbury County. This iteration of Iowa 7 ceased to be on January 1, 1969. The Iowa State Highway Commission had completed a rationalization of the primary highway system; the Iowa 7 number was reused on a former segment of Iowa 5 from near Aurelia to Fort Dodge. Though it was no longer Iowa 7, the Sioux City portion of the highway stayed on the primary highway system for four more years as the unsigned Iowa 985.

== Major intersections ==
| County | Location | mi | km | Destinations | Notes |
|---|---|---|---|---|---|
| Woodbury | Council Bluffs | 0.00 | 0.00 | I-29 / US 20 east / US 77 north – Sioux City, Sioux Falls US 20 west / US 77 south – South Sioux City | |
| Plymouth | Johnson Township | 22.09 | 35.55 | Iowa 3 – Le Mars, Akron | |
1.000 mi = 1.609 km; 1.000 km = 0.621 mi
