= List of state highways in Iowa =

- Highway markers from different years

Highway names
- Interstates: Interstate nn (I-nn)
- US Highways: U.S. Highway nn (US nn)
- State: Iowa nn

System links
- Iowa Primary Highway System; Interstate; US; State; Secondary; Scenic

State highways in the U.S. state of Iowa are owned and maintained by the Iowa Department of Transportation.

== State highways ==
Number	Length (mi)	Length (km)	Southern or western terminus	Northern or eastern terminus	Formed	Removed	Notes
No. 1	236	380	Missouri state line near Lamoni	Minnesota state line near Northwood	1920	1926	Jefferson Highway through Iowa; replaced by US 65 and US 69
Iowa 1	119.268	191.943	Iowa 2 south of Keosauqua	US 151 south of Anamosa	1926	current	
Iowa 2	233.80	376.26	US 6 near Lewis	IL 2 at Muscatine	1920	1939	Renumbered Iowa 92 (renumbering approved 1938)
Iowa 2	251.376	404.550	N-2 at Nebraska City, Neb.	US 61 at Fort Madison	1941	current	Formerly Iowa 3
Iowa 3	267.07	429.81	N-2 at Nebraska City, Neb.	IL 9 at Fort Madison	1920	1941	Renumbered Iowa 2
Iowa 3	323.102	519.982	SD 50 near Westfield	Northwest Arterial at Dubuque	1945	current	Replaced part of Iowa 5, all of Iowa 221, and part of Iowa 10
Iowa 4	29.70	47.80	US 59 / Iowa 141 at Denison	Iowa 175 at Odebolt	1920	1968	Renumbered Iowa 39
Iowa 4	146.343	235.516	Iowa 44 in Panora	MN 4 near Estherville	1969	current	Formerly Iowa 17
Iowa 5	77.64	124.95	Iowa 3 near Aurelia	US 169 at Fort Dodge	1920	1968	Renumbered Iowa 7
Iowa 5	103.540	166.631	Route 5 south of Cincinnati	I-35 near West Des Moines	1969	current	Formerly portion of Iowa 60
No. 6	369	594	Nebraska state line at Council Bluffs	Illinois state line at Clinton	1920	1926	Lincoln Highway through Iowa; replaced by US 30
Iowa 6	104	167	Route 5 near Cincinnati	US 32 in Des Moines	1926	1931	Formerly No. 17 and No. 59; became part of Iowa 60 when US 6 extended into Iowa
Iowa 7	140.69	226.42	US 6 at Council Bluffs	City US 6 in Des Moines	1920	1939	Replaced by an extended Iowa 64
Iowa 7	0.47	0.76	Iowa 99 in Oakville	Oakville	1955	1957	Renumbered Iowa 407; spur route
Iowa 7	24.18	38.91	I-29 / US 77 in Sioux City	Iowa 3 near Brunsville	1957	1968	Formerly Iowa 29; portion became Iowa 985
Iowa 7	73.661	118.546	Iowa 3 near Aurelia	US 169 at Fort Dodge	1969	current	Formerly Iowa 5
No. 8	283	455	No. 6 in Council Bluffs	Illinois state line at Burlington	1920	1926	Replaced by US 34
Iowa 8	13.961	22.468	US 63 in Traer	US 218 near Garrison	1926	current	
Iowa 9	295.088	474.898	SD 42 near Larchwood	WIS 82 at Lansing	1920	current	
Iowa 10	104.512	168.196	SD 46 near Hawarden	Iowa 4 at Havelock	1920	current	
Iowa 11	96.60	155.46	US 151 / Iowa 64 in Cedar Rapids	US 52 / Iowa 24 in Calmar	1920	1941	Replaced by Iowa 150, which was proposed to become part of US 150
Iowa 12	46.274	74.471	US 20 / US 75 at Sioux City	Iowa 10 in Hawarden	1920	current	Signed as US 20 Bus through Sioux City
Iowa 13	85.235	137.172	US 30 / US 151 near Bertram	US 52 near Froelich	1920	current	
Iowa 14	187.838	302.296	Iowa 2 at Corydon	US 18 / US 218 Bus in Charles City	1920	current	
Iowa 15	111	179	US 30 in Ames	Minnesota state line near Lake Mills	1920	1935	Replaced by US 69
Iowa 15	14.92	24.01	Iowa 137 at Eddyville	US 63 in Ottumwa	1937	1968	Renumbered Iowa 23
Iowa 15	4.655	7.491	Route 15 south of Milton	Iowa 2 at Milton	1969	2003	Formerly Iowa 23
Iowa 15	63.578	102.319	Iowa 3 near Pocahontas	MN 15 near Armstrong	1969	current	Formerly Iowa 44
Iowa 16	239	385	Missouri state line near Redding	Minnesota state line near Ledyard	1920	1930	Replaced by US 169
Iowa 16	65.488	105.393	US 34 near Agency	US 61 at Wever	1930	current	
Iowa 17	147.48	237.35	Iowa 64 in Panora	MN 4 near Estherville	1920	1968	Renumbered Iowa 4
Iowa 17	102.789	165.423	Iowa 141 at Granger	US 18 near Wesley	1969	current	Formerly portion of Iowa 60
No. 18	148	238	Missouri state line at Braddyville	No. 23 at Sac City	1920	1926	Replaced by US 71
No. 19	302	486	South Dakota state line near Inwood	Wisconsin state line at Lansing	1920	1926	East end truncated to US 75 for a month in 1926; replaced by US 18
Iowa 19	2.44	3.93	Backbone State Park	Iowa 3 / Iowa 13 near Strawberry Point	1927	1957	Renumbered Iowa 410
No. 20	324	521	Illinois state line at Keokuk	Minnesota state line near Burr Oak	1920	1926	Replaced by US 61 and US 55
Iowa 21	115	185	Minnesota state line near Allendorf	Iowa 141 near Denison	1920	1934	Replaced by Iowa 73 (proposed US 73)
Iowa 21	97.152	156.351	Iowa 149 near Hedrick	US 20 / Iowa 27 at Waterloo	1934	current	Formerly ended at Iowa 92; extended south in 1980
No. 22	34	55	No. 5 at Le Mars	Minnesota state line north of Rock Rapids	1920	1926	Replaced by US 75
Iowa 22	97.905	157.563	Iowa 21 near Thornburg	US 61 at Davenport	1926	current	
No. 23	130	210	South Dakota state line at Sioux City	No. 16 at Fort Dodge	1920	1926	Replaced by US 20
Iowa 23	4.78	7.69	Route 15 south of Milton	Iowa 2 at Milton	1926	1968	Formerly part of No. 11; renumbered Iowa 15
Iowa 23	14.316	23.039	US 63 in Ottumwa	Iowa 137 at Eddyville	1969	1997	Formerly Iowa 15; partially replaced by US 63
Iowa 23	16.022	25.785	Iowa 92 at Oskaloosa	Iowa 149 near Fremont	1997	current	Formerly US 63
Iowa 24	127	204	US 71 near Lyman	US 63 in Oskaloosa	1920	1927	Replaced by an extended Iowa 2
Iowa 24	27.546	44.331	US 18 / US 63 in New Hampton	US 52 / Iowa 150 in Calmar	1928	current	
No. 25	20	32	No. 15 / No. 24 at Winterset	No. 2 / No. 17 at Adel	1920	1926	Replaced by relocated Iowa 16
Iowa 25	103.419	166.437	Iowa 2 near Benton	US 30 near Scranton	1926	current	Continued south to the Missouri state line until 1978, and to Blockton until 1980
Iowa 26	10	16	US 18 near Rock Valley	US 18 near Rock Valley	1920	1930	Replaced by relocated US 18 (portions were cancelled in exchange for relocated US 18)
Iowa 26	9.52	15.32	US 18 in Inwood	Iowa 9 near Larchwood	1930	1968	Renumbered Iowa 182
Iowa 26	11.370	18.298	Iowa 9 in Lansing	MN 26 at New Albin	1969	current	Formerly Iowa 182
Iowa 27	21.2	34.1	Iowa 12 in Akron	US 75 in Le Mars	1920	1929	Replaced by an extended Iowa 5
Iowa 27	11	18	Nebraska border	US 30 / US 75 in Missouri Valley	1929	1930	Renumbered Iowa 130
Iowa 27	6.86	11.04	Alvord	US 75 near Rock Rapids	1930	1980	Spur route; originally from US 75 to George
Iowa 27	281.689	453.335	Route 27 near Wayland, Mo.	I-35 at the Minnesota state line	2001	current	Avenue of the Saints
No. 28	72	116	No. 6 / No. 11 in Cedar Rapids	No. 5 / No. 20 in Dubuque	1920	1926	Replaced by US 161
Iowa 28	21.613	34.783	Iowa 92 at Martensdale	I-35 / I-80 at Johnston	1926	current	Previously ended at Iowa 5; extended to US 6 in 1980, and to I-80 in 1991
Iowa 29	22.06	35.50	I-29 / US 77 in Sioux City	Iowa 3 near Brunsville	1920	1957	Renumbered Iowa 7 when I-29 was designated
No. 30	25	40	No. 23 at Moville	No. 5 at Remsen	1920	1926	Renumbered Iowa 140
Iowa 31	38.504	61.966	US 59 near Quimby	Iowa 141 near Smithland	1920	current	
No. 32	5	8.0	No. 5 near Cleghorn	Cleghorn	1920	1926	Renumbered Iowa 145
Iowa 32	7.68	12.36	Iowa 9 near Spirit Lake	US 71 near Milford	1934	1981	extended and renumbered Iowa 86 to match Minnesota
Iowa 32	5.101	8.209	US 20 at Dubuque	US 52 / Iowa 3 at Sageville	1995	2021	Turned over to Dubuque after the US 52 Southwest Arterial opened
Iowa 33	3.4	5.5	Meriden	Iowa 5	1920	1930	Became a county road (now L51) due to rerouting of Iowa 5 between Iowa 143 and Cherokee
Iowa 33	55.95	90.04	US 75 at Le Mars	MN 60 at Bigelow, Minn.	1930	1968	Renumbered Iowa 60
No. 34	68	109	No. 4 at Denison	No. 12 at Sioux City	1920	1926	Renumbered Iowa 141
Iowa 35	49.00	78.86	Iowa 37 near Turin	US 71 near Odebolt	1920	1948	Replaced by an extended Iowa 175
Iowa 35	0.23	0.37	US 18 near Garner	Garner	1954	1957	Spur route; renumbered Iowa 409 when I-35 was designated
Iowa 36	2.983	4.801	Wall Lake	US 71 near Wall Lake	1920	2003	Spur route; now County Roads M64 (north-south section) and D59 (east-west section)
Iowa 37	40.321	64.890	Iowa 175 near Turin	US 59 near Earling	1920	current	Continued east to Irwin until 1982
Iowa 38	98.941	159.230	US 61 Bus / Iowa 92 in Muscatine	Iowa 3 near Edgewood	1920	current	
Iowa 39	11.68	18.80	US 30 near Logan	Iowa 64 / Iowa 191 at Portsmouth	1920	1968	Renumbered Iowa 44
Iowa 39	24.321	39.141	US 59 at Denison	Iowa 175 at Odebolt	1969	current	Formerly Iowa 4
No. 40	262	422	No. 20 in Keokuk	Minnesota state line near Mona	1920	1926	Replaced by US 161, US 20, US 30, and US 218; the entire route is now US 218
Iowa 40	3.524	5.671	Allerton	Iowa 2 near Corydon	1926	2003	Spur route; now County Road S26
Iowa 41	1.827	2.940	Malvern	US 34 near Malvern	1920	2003	Spur route; now County Road L63
Iowa 42	4.18	6.73	US 275 / Iowa 2 near Riverton	Riverton	1920	1980	Spur route; now County Road J46
Iowa 43	1.75	2.82	Ringsted	Iowa 15 near Ringsted	1920	1980	Spur route; now a local road and County Road A34
Iowa 44	63.95	102.92	Iowa 3 near Pocahontas	MN 15 near Armstrong	1920	1968	Renumbered Iowa 15
Iowa 44	104.524	168.215	US 30 near Logan	Iowa 141 at Grimes	1969	current	Formerly Iowa 39 and Iowa 64
Iowa 45	1.324	2.131	Manilla	Iowa 141 near Manilla	1920	2003	Spur route; now County Road M65
Iowa 46	64.84	104.35	US 59 near Denison	Iowa 17 (now Iowa 144) in Perry	1920	1941	Originally a double spur route; replaced by an extended Iowa 141
Iowa 46	4.34	6.98	Iowa 90 in Des Moines	Iowa 28 (now Army Post Road) in Des Moines	1942	1950	Now 9th Street, Mulberry Street, and 7th Street
Iowa 46	6.57	10.57	Iowa 5 near Avon	Iowa 163 in Des Moines	1953	1998	Now city streets
Iowa 47	13	21	Iowa 287 in Farnhamville	US 169 near Harcourt	1920	1940	Spur route; replaced by an extended Iowa 175
Iowa 47	0.82	1.32	Iowa 14 near Allison	Allison	1941	1980	Spur route; now 7th Street
Iowa 48	47.919	77.118	US 59 at Shenandoah	US 6 near Lewis	1920	current	
Iowa 49	27.228	43.819	Iowa 2 in Bedford	US 34 in Adams County	1920	2003	Was originally a spur route from US 34 to Lenox; now County Roads N64, J23, N52, J35, and N44 (in order from US 34 to Iowa 2)
Iowa 50	7.135	11.483	US 169 near Lehigh	Lehigh	1920	2003	Spur route; now County Road D43
Iowa 51	11.007	17.714	US 18 / US 52 at Postville	Iowa 9 near Waukon	1920	current	
Iowa 52	7	11	Elma	US 63 east of Elma	1920	1934	Spur route; renumbered Iowa 272 when US 52 extended into Iowa
No. 53	13	21	No. 14 near Rockford	No. 19 near Nora Springs	1920	1926	Renumbered Iowa 147 to avoid conflict with US 53 (which became US 55 in the revised numbering plan; see below)
Iowa 53	3.04	4.89	Iowa 3 near Clarksville	Clarksville	1926	1949	Formerly No. 55; became part of Iowa 188
Iowa 53	1.43	2.30	Gowrie	Iowa 175 near Gowrie	1953	1969	Spur route; now local roads (Market and 4th Streets)
Iowa 54	2.99	4.81	Marble Rock	Iowa 14 in Floyd County	1920	1980	Spur route; now County Road B60
No. 55	3	4.8	No. 10 near Clarksville	Clarksville	1920	1926	Renumbered Iowa 53 to avoid conflict with US 55
Iowa 55	4.506	7.252	Seymour	Iowa 2 near Promise City	1934	2003	Spur route; now County Road S60
Iowa 56	24.432	39.319	Iowa 150 at West Union	Iowa 13 at Elkader	1920	current	
Iowa 57	18.41	29.63	Iowa 14 near Fern	Iowa 58 in Cedar Falls	1920	1986	Section from Iowa 58 to US 20 was deleted in 1980; removed after US 20 freeway was constructed
Iowa 57	43.765	70.433	US 65 near Iowa Falls	US 218 / Iowa 27 / Iowa 58 at Cedar Falls	1986	current	Formerly US 20
Iowa 58	12.030	19.360	US 63 at Hudson	US 218 / Iowa 27 / Iowa 57 at Cedar Falls	1920	current	
Iowa 59	197	317	Minnesota state line	Iowa 5 at Albia	1920	1934	Replaced by US 63 and Iowa 137
Iowa 60	233.24	375.36	Route 5 south of Cincinnati	US 18 near Wesley	1920	1968	Renumbered Iowa 5 and Iowa 17
Iowa 60	58.771	94.583	US 75 at Le Mars	MN 60 at Bigelow, Minn.	1969	current	Formerly Iowa 33
No. 61	73	117	No. 28 at Anamosa	No. 6 in Lyons	1920	1926	Renumbered Iowa 117 and Iowa 136
Iowa 62	19.633	31.596	Iowa 64 at Maquoketa	US 52 in Bellevue	1920	current	
No. 63	24	39	No. 59 in New Sharon	No. 7 in Grinnell	1920	1926	Renumbered Iowa 146
Iowa 64	32	51	Iowa 163 at Prairie City	US 30 in Colo	1920	1936	Renumbered Iowa 117
Iowa 64	64.355	103.569	US 151 at Anamosa	US 52 / IL 64 at Savanna, Ill.	1939	current	Formerly Iowa 117
No. 65	21	34	No. 8 at Lucas	No. 1 south of Indianola	1920	1926	Renumbered Iowa 137
Iowa 66	7	11	Humeston	Iowa 3 near Humeston	1920	1930	Spur route; replaced by an extended Iowa 137
Iowa 66	7.011	11.283	Iowa 2 near Diagonal	Diagonal	1930	2003	Spur route; now County Road P33
Iowa 67	6	9.7	Seymour	Iowa 3 near Promise City	1920	1934	Spur route; renumbered Iowa 55 when US 67 extended into Iowa
Iowa 68	1.933	3.111	Melrose	US 34 near Melrose	1920	2003	Spur route; now County Road S70
No. 69	3	4.8	No. 3 near Mystic	Mystic	1920	1926	Renumbered Iowa 138
Iowa 70	8.20	13.20	Macksburg	US 169 near Macksburg	1920	1966	Spur route; now County Road G41
Iowa 70	23.954	38.550	Iowa 92 at Columbus Junction	US 6 in West Liberty	1969	current	Formerly Iowa 76
No. 71	3	4.8	Moulton	No. 3 near Moulton	1920	1926	Renumbered Iowa 142
Iowa 72	10.89	17.53	US 69 west of Dows	I-35 east of Dows	1920	1986	Originally a spur route; extended east from Dows to I-35 in 1980
Iowa 73	35.9	57.8	Iowa 8 in Dysart	US 6 in Marengo	1920	1934	Renumbered Iowa 212 to avoid conflict with new Iowa 73, which was proposed to become part of US 73
Iowa 73	225	362	Missouri state line south of Shenandoah	Minnesota state line near Allendorf	1934	1935	Was proposed to become part of US 73; replaced by US 59
Iowa 73	14.97	24.09	Iowa 141 in Coon Rapids	Iowa 44	1936	1972	Became County Road N46
Iowa 74	38.27	61.59	Iowa 38 in Tipton	US 61 in Davenport	1920	1941	Replaced by Iowa 150, which was proposed to become part of US 150
Iowa 74	11.168	17.973	US 151 in Cedar Rapids	Palo	1943	1966	Spur route; renumbred Iowa 94 when I-74 was designated
No. 75	2	3.2	No. 5 near Marcus	Marcus	1920	1926	Renumbered Iowa 143
Iowa 76	25.98	41.81	Columbus City	US 6 in West Liberty	1920	1968	Renumbered Iowa 70
Iowa 76	48.911	78.715	US 18 near McGregor	MN 76 near Eitzen, Minn.	1969	current	Formerly portion of Iowa 13
Iowa 77	2.685	4.321	Iowa 92 near Keota	Keota	1920	2003	Spur route, continued south to Iowa 78 until 1980; now County Road W15 and a local road
Iowa 78	58.429	94.032	Iowa 149 near Martinsburg	US 61 near Morning Sun	1920	current	
Iowa 79	1.84	2.96	Iowa 2 near Bonaparte	Bonaparte	1920	1980	Spur route; now County Road W40
Iowa 79	5.637	9.072	Geode State Park	US 34 in Middletown	1980	2003	Park access road; was a county road before commissioning and returned to a county road; initially known as County Road 79 until 2005 when it became J20
Iowa 80	4.00	6.44	US 34 near West Burlington	US 61 in Burlington	1920	1957	Spur route; renumbered Iowa 406 when I-80 was designated
Iowa 81	9.20	14.81	Iowa 92 near West Chester	Iowa 22 at Wellman	1920	1968	Renumbered Iowa 114
Iowa 81	2.215	3.565	Route 81 near Farmington	Iowa 2 near Farmington	1969	current	Formerly Iowa 114
Iowa 82	3.773	6.072	Blairstown	US 30 near Blairstown	1920	2003	Spur route; now County Road V66
Iowa 83	34.191	55.025	US 59 in Avoca	Iowa 148 in Anita	1920	current	Continued west to Neola until 2003
Iowa 84	6.09	9.80	College Springs	US 71 near Shambaugh	1920	1943	Spur route; replaced by an extended Iowa 333
Iowa 84	2.13	3.43	Eastern Iowa Airport	I-380 near Cedar Rapids	1943	1980	Airport access road; now County Road E70
Iowa 85	8.408	13.531	Montezuma city limits	Iowa 21 near Deep River	1920	current	
Iowa 86	4	6.4	US 34 in Council Bluffs	Lake Manawa	1920	1928	Spur route; restored in 1931 as Iowa 241, later Iowa 192
Iowa 86	3.7	6.0	US 61 (now Sunnyside Avenue) in Burlington	US 61 (now Summer Street) in Burlington	1929	1945	Now Roosevelt Avenue and West Avenue
Iowa 86	0.47	0.76	Fertile	Iowa 9 at Fertile	1945	1980	Spur route
Iowa 86	12.519	20.147	US 71 near Milford	MN 86 near Spirit Lake	1980	current	
Iowa 87	4.06	6.53	US 69 west of Elkhart	Elkhart	1920	1983	Spur route
Iowa 88	37.65	60.59	US 6 in Altoona	US 30 near Marshalltown	1920	1939	Originally a spur route; replaced by an extended Iowa 64
Iowa 88	8.01	12.89	US 61 / Iowa 2 in Fort Madison	Iowa 16 in Denmark	1940	1980	Originally a spur route
Iowa 89	25.87	41.63	US 169 near Bouton	Iowa 64 in Johnston	1920	1941	Originally a spur route; replaced by an extended Iowa 141
Iowa 89	7.69	12.38	Iowa 141 near Woodward	Iowa 17 in Madrid	1946	1980	Replaced by an extended Iowa 210
No. 90	40	64	No. 17 near Bouton	No. 16 at Harcourt	1920	1926	Replaced by relocated Iowa 16 (now US 169)
Iowa 90	16	26	Iowa 14 at Grundy Center	Iowa 59 near Voorhies	1926	1932	Formerly No. 58; became part of Iowa 58 again
Iowa 90	16.32	26.26	I-80 in Dallas County	I-35 in Des Moines	1932	1981	Now County Road F90; section in Polk County maintained as unsigned Iowa 934 until 1989
Iowa 91	2.69	4.33	US 169 near Harcourt	Dayton	1920	1940	Spur route; replaced by an extended Iowa 175
Iowa 91	4.18	6.73	Ledyard	US 169 near Ledyard	1940	1980	Spur route; now County Road A30
Iowa 91	4.643	7.472	Iowa 9 in Lyon County	MN 91 at the Minnesota state line	1980	2003	Now County Road L14 (was K64 before 1980)
Iowa 92	1.33	2.14	Iowa 101 near Urbana	Urbana	1920	1939	Spur route; became Iowa 363
Iowa 92	274.231	441.332	US 275 / N-92 in Council Bluffs	IL 92 at Muscatine	1939	current	Formerly Iowa 2
Iowa 93	29.534	47.530	US 63 near Tripoli	Iowa 150 in Fayette	1920	current	
Iowa 94	13.12	21.11	US 151 in Marion	US 30 in Mount Vernon	1920	1958	Replaced by relocated Iowa 150
Iowa 94	11.168	17.973	US 151 Business in Cedar Rapids	Palo	1966	2003	Spur route; now County Road W36 in Linn County and city streets in Cedar Rapids
Iowa 95	6	9.7	US 169 near Bouton	Woodward	1920	1932	Spur route; replaced by an extended Iowa 89
Iowa 95	3.70	5.95	Carbon	Iowa 148 north of Corning	1932	1983	Spur route; section inside Carbon eliminated 1980; rest redesignated as unsigned Iowa 951
Iowa 96	16.635	26.771	Iowa 14 near Gladbrook	US 63 near Gladbrook	1920	current	
Iowa 97	1.532	2.466	Russell	US 34 near Russell	1920	2003	Spur route; much of route now County Road S56 with the last two blocks now Shaw Street
Iowa 98	11.10	17.86	US 34 near Agency	Selma	1920	1944	Spur route; replaced by an extended Iowa 16, and Iowa 98 was reassigned to the old route of Iowa 16
Iowa 98	1.814	2.919	Leando	Iowa 16 near Douds	1920	2017	Spur route; originally began at Iowa 8 (later US 34) east of Agency, but was shortened to Iowa 16 near Douds in 1942 (this section became Iowa 16); now County Road V64
Iowa 99	33	53	US 30 near Camanche	US 61 in Davenport	1920	1931	Replaced by US 55 (later US 67)
Iowa 99	33.232	53.482	US 34 in Burlington	US 61 in Wapello	1931	2003	Now County Road X99; was County Road 99 until 2005
Iowa 100	44.42	71.49	US 275 / Iowa 375 in Council Bluffs	US 71 in Lyman	1920	1958	Originally a spur route from Iowa 2/Iowa 24 (now US 6) to Griswold, this became part of Iowa 48 in 1923; east-west route designated 1921 when Iowa 24 was decommissioned through Lewis, replaced by relocated Iowa 92
Iowa 100	6.12	9.85	US 6 near Lewis	US 71 near Atlantic	1958	1958	Former section of Iowa 92; renumbered Iowa 414 due to confusion with old Iowa 100
Iowa 100	16.140	25.975	US 30 / US 218 in Cedar Rapids	US 151 / Iowa 13 near Marion	1984	current	Former portion of Iowa 150
Iowa 101	15.56	25.04	US 218 in Vinton	Iowa 150 north of Urbana	1920	1984	Replaced by a relocated Iowa 150
Iowa 102	1.82	2.93	Hawkeye	US 18 near Hawkeye	1920	1980	Now County Road W14
Iowa 102	0.501	0.806	New Sharon city limits	US 63 / Iowa 146 in New Sharon	1980	current	Unsigned highway; formerly extended to Pella (this is now County Road G5T)
Iowa 103	15.649	25.185	US 218 near Donnellson	US 61 / Iowa 2 in Fort Madison	1920	2003	Now County Road J40
No. 104	20	32	No. 8 near Council Bluffs	No. 4 in Macedonia	1920	1926	First highway to be decommissioned in Iowa; became a county road (now numbered G66)
Iowa 104	1.53	2.46	Woodburn	US 34 near Woodburn	1927	1980	Spur route; now County Road R69; segment in Woodburn maintained as unsigned Iowa 942 until 2003
Iowa 105	34.23	55.09	US 69 in Lake Mills	US 218 in St. Ansgar	1920	1992	Section from US 69 to Winnebago–Worth county line last shows on 1994 map, so was signed until 1994; now County Road 105
Iowa 106	8.98	14.45	Iowa 107 in Clear Lake	US 65 in Mason City	1920	1980	Now local roads and County Road B35
Iowa 107	27.579	44.384	Iowa 3 near Alexander	CR B35 near Clear Lake	1920	2011	All but parts in Meservey and Thornton removed in 2003; now County Roads S25, B65 and S14
Iowa 108	1.18	1.90	Delta	Iowa 92 near Delta	1923	1980	Spur route; now County Road V33 and Iowa 21
Iowa 109	1.268	2.041	Oxford	US 6 near Oxford	1923	2003	Spur route; now County Road W38
Iowa 110	0.7	1.1	Larrabee	Iowa 73 in Larrabee	1923	1934	Spur route; decommissioned when Iowa 73 (proposed US 73, now US 59) was relocated to go through Larrabee; now a county road (455th Street)
Iowa 110	14.789	23.801	US 20 at Schaller	Iowa 7 at Storm Lake	1934	current	
Iowa 111	26.72	43.00	Kanawha	Woden	1923	1990	Double spur route with US 18; originally a spur route; now County Road R35
Iowa 112	3	4.8	Iowa 13	Edgewood	1923	1930	Spur route; replaced by an extended Iowa 10 (this section now Iowa 3)
Iowa 112	5.19	8.35	Volga	Iowa 13 near Osborne	1931	1980	Spur route; now County Road C24
Iowa 113	34.09	54.86	Iowa 10 near Edgewood	US 151 in Monticello	1924	1938	Replaced by an extended Iowa 38
Iowa 113	1.187	1.910	Iowa 64 near Spragueville	Spragueville	1938	2003	Spur route; now County Road Z20
Iowa 114	2.22	3.57	Route 81 near Farmington	Iowa 2 near Farmington	1923	1968	Swapped with Iowa 81
Iowa 114	9.20	14.81	Iowa 92 near West Chester	Iowa 22 at Wellman	1969	1981	Formerly Iowa 81; now County Road W38
Iowa 115	1.34	2.16	US 69	Story City	1923	1969	Spur route; now County Road E15
Iowa 115	1.237	1.991	US 34 near Stanton	Viking Lake State Park	1980	2003	Park access road; now County Roads M65 and H43
Iowa 116	1.57	2.53	US 20 near Manchester	Manchester Fish Hatchery	1923	1976	Fish hatchery access road; renumbered Iowa 938 because US 20 was rerouted
Iowa 116	2.776	4.468	Iowa 3 in Waverly	US 218 near Waverly	1998	current	Section of US 218 Business in Waverly; signed as US 218 Business instead of Iowa 118
Iowa 117	63	101	US 161 at Anamosa	US 52 / IL 64 at Savanna, Ill.	1923	1936	Swapped with Iowa 64
Iowa 117	18.562	29.873	Iowa 163 at Prairie City	US 65 / Iowa 330 near Mingo	1939	current	Formerly Iowa 64
Iowa 118	4.06	6.53	Steamboat Rock	Iowa 175 near Eldora	1923	1989	Spur route; now County Road S56 and a local road (Market Street)
Iowa 119	1.04	1.67	Dorchester	Iowa 76 near Dorchester	1923	1980	Spur route; now County Road A16
Iowa 120	0.80	1.29	Stanton	US 34 near Stanton	1924	1980	Spur route; now County Road M63
Iowa 121	0.51	0.82	Dolliver Memorial State Park	Iowa 50 near Lehigh	1924	1964	Park access road; became a county road (now numbered D64)
Iowa 122	5.47	8.80	Iowa 150 in Davenport	US 61 in Davenport	1924	1960	Now Pine Street, Cheyenne Avenue, Division Street, Locust Street, and Marquette Street
Iowa 122	3.04	4.89	Iowa 3 near Clarksville	Clarksville	1964	1965	Former section of Iowa 188; became part of Iowa 188 again
Iowa 122	12.264	19.737	I-35 / US 18 at Clear Lake	Mason City city limits	1999	current	
Iowa 123	10.51	16.91	I-35 in Des Moines	Iowa 90 in Des Moines	1924	1959	Partially replaced by Iowa 60; rest now Fleur Drive
Iowa 123	0.45	0.72	US 34 near Rome	Rome	1969	1980	Spur route; inside Rome stayed in the highway system until 1981
Iowa 124	2.567	4.131	Iowa 4 in Calhoun County	Twin Lakes State Park	1924	2003	Park access road; now County Roads D26 and N57
Iowa 125	3.26	5.25	Salem	US 218 east of Salem	1924	1981	Spur route; section inside Salem deleted in 1980; now County Road J20
Iowa 126	1.28	2.06	US 6 near Mitchellville	Mitchellville	1924	1980	Spur route; now unsigned County Road S27
Iowa 127	15.985	25.725	I-29 near Mondamin	US 30 in Logan	1924	current	
Iowa 128	6.982	11.236	Iowa 13 near Elkader	US 52 near Garnavillo	1924	current	
Iowa 129	0.45	0.72	US 34 near Rome	Rome	1924	1969	Spur route; renumbered Iowa 123 when I-129 was designated
Iowa 130	12	19	Iowa 9 near Cresco	Minnesota border near Harmony, Minn	1925	1930	Renumbered Iowa 139 so Iowa 130 could be reused as a spur of US 30
Iowa 130	11	18	Nebraska border	US 30 / US 75 in Missouri Valley	1930	1931	Formerly Iowa 27; replaced by relocated US 30
Iowa 130	6.65	10.70	Maquoketa Caves State Park	US 61 near Maquoketa	1931	1966	Park access road; became a county road (later numbered Y31); was Iowa 428 from 1980 to 2003
Iowa 130	32.023	51.536	Iowa 38 in Tipton	I-80 / US 61 at Davenport	1969	current	Former section of Iowa 150
Iowa 131	2	3.2	US 20 near Holstein	US 59 near Holstein	1925	1937	Section from US 20 to Holstein replaced by realigned US 59; rest given to county because US 59 was realigned
Iowa 131	4.520	7.274	Iowa 21 in Belle Plaine	US 30 near Belle Plaine	1937	2003	Part of the Lincoln Highway; now County Road V40
Iowa 132	5.74	9.24	I-35 / I-80 in Des Moines	Iowa 90 (now US 6) in Des Moines	1925	1963	Now Douglas Avenue
Iowa 133	4.23	6.81	US 34 / US 218 in Mount Pleasant	Oakland Mills Park (then a state park)	1925	1961	Park access road; became a county road (now numbered H61)
Iowa 133	0.970	1.561	US 30 in Nevada	Nevada	1964	2003	Spur route; now 6th Street
Iowa 134	7	11	US 65 near Hubbard	Iowa 58	1925	1930	Replaced by relocated Iowa 58
Iowa 134	8	13	Nebraska state line	US 34 / US 275 in Glenwood	1930	1935	Replaced by relocated US 34
Iowa 134	4.06	6.53	US 65 near Hampton	Geneva	1935	1980	Spur route; now County Road C47
Iowa 134	1.75	2.82	Beed's Lake State Park	Iowa 3 near Hampton	1980	1987	Park access road; now County Road S42
Iowa 135	0.75	1.21	US 30 near Le Grand	Le Grand	1926	1954	Spur route; replaced by relocated US 30; Iowa 135 on route shown below
Iowa 135	1.96	3.15	Montour	US 30 near Montour	1954	1980	Spur route; now County Road T47
Iowa 136	87.611	140.996	IL 136 at Clinton	US 20 / US 52 at Dyersville	1926	current	
Iowa 137	21	34	US 34 at Lucas	US 65 near Indianola	1926	1934	Formerly No. 65; replaced by realigned US 65
Iowa 137	14.526	23.377	Iowa 5 at Albia	US 63 / Iowa 163 at Eddyville	1934	current	Formerly Iowa 59
Iowa 138	3.16	5.09	Iowa 2 near Mystic	Mystic	1926	1973	Formerly No. 69; now County Road T14
Iowa 139	21	34	US 161 in Iowa City	Iowa 38 near Rochester	1926	1929	Formerly No. 74; replaced by an extended Iowa 1
Iowa 139	11.431	18.396	Iowa 9 near Cresco	MN 139 near Harmony, Minn	1930	current	Formerly Iowa 130; continued south to Protivin from 1935 to 1980
Iowa 140	25.309	40.731	US 20 at Moville	Iowa 3 at Remsen	1926	current	Formerly No. 30; continued south to Sloan from 1931 to 1961, and to Hornick from 1961 to 1964; section from Kingsley to Remsen deleted in 1965, but restored in 1980
Iowa 141	155.362	250.031	I-29 near Sloan	I-35 / I-80 at Grimes	1926	current	
Iowa 142	10.50	16.90	Route 202 at Coatsville, Mo	Iowa 2 near Moulton	1926	1968	Former Iowa 71; renumbered Iowa 202
Iowa 142	20.901	33.637	Iowa 2 in Plano	Iowa 5 near Moravia	1980	2003	Now County Roads S70 and J18
Iowa 143	12.049	19.391	Iowa 3 at Marcus	Iowa 10 at Granville	1926	current	
Iowa 144	34.039	54.780	Iowa 141 at Perry	Iowa 175 near Harcourt	1926	current	
Iowa 145	5	8.0	Iowa 5 near Cleghorn	Cleghorn	1926	1931	Formerly No. 32; became a county road (now numbered L40)
Iowa 145	7.408	11.922	I-29 near Thurman	US 275 near Sidney	1931	2003	Originally a spur route west to Thurman; extended west in 1980; now County Road J24
Iowa 146	42.735	68.775	US 63 / Iowa 102 in New Sharon	US 30 in Le Grand	1926	current	
Iowa 147	6.706	10.792	Rockford	Iowa 14 in Floyd County	1926	2003	Spur route, former Iowa 53; now County Road B45
Iowa 148	66.828	107.549	Route 148 near Bedford	I-80 / US 6 near Anita	1926	current	
Iowa 149	65.897	106.051	US 34 in Ottumwa	I-80 near Williamsburg	1926	current	Section from I-80 to US 6 removed 1985
Iowa 150	19	31	US 32 at Homestead	US 30 near Cedar Rapids	1926	1930	Formerly No. 13; replaced by an extended Iowa 149
Iowa 150	10	16	Schleswig	Iowa 141 near Denison	1930	1930	Replaced by an extended Iowa 21
Iowa 150	22.96	36.95	US 30 / Iowa 17 in Jefferson	Iowa 64 in Panora	1931	1941	Replaced by relocated Iowa 17 to avoid conflict with new Iowa 150, which was proposed to become part of US 150
Iowa 150	85.093	136.944	US 218 at Vinton	US 52 / Iowa 24 at Calmar	1941	current	
Iowa 151	13	21	US 71 at Auburn	Iowa 17 near Lake City	1926	1938	Formerly No. 35; renumbered Iowa 188 when US 151 extended into Iowa
Iowa 152	1.31	2.11	US 34 near Murray	Murray	1926	1980	Formerly No. 8; now County Road R16
Iowa 152	1.402	2.256	I-35 near Osceola	US 69 at Osceola	1980	2014	Now County Road R35
Iowa 153	7.0	11.3	Iowa 117 in Wyoming	Oxford Junction	1926	1930	Replaced by an extended Iowa 136
Iowa 153	4.82	7.76	US 218 near North Liberty	US 6 near Coralville	1930	1957	Replaced by rerouted US 218 and local roads
Iowa 153	1.02	1.64	US 218 near North Liberty	North Liberty	1957	1968	Former portion of US 218; now Dubuque Street
Iowa 154	12.82	20.63	Iowa 150 near Fayette	Iowa 3 in Maryville	1926	1980	Replaced by Iowa 187
Iowa 155	7.0	11.3	Commerce	Iowa 28 (now 9th Street) in Des Moines	1927	1931	Spur route; now Walnut Woods Drive, Browns Woods Drive, and McKinley Avenue; parts of the road were destroyed
Iowa 155	3.05	4.91	Nodaway	US 34 near Nodaway	1933	1980	Spur route; now County Road N26, 8th Avenue and 3rd Street
Iowa 156	4.748	7.641	Iowa 5 near Marysville	Bussey	1928	2003	Spur route, section inside Bussey removed 1980; now County Road G71
Iowa 157	0.15	0.24	Monticello	US 161 near Monticello	1928	1931	Spur route; now Cedar Street; was the shortest state highway at the time
Iowa 157	1.032	1.661	US 63 near Lime Springs	Lime Springs	1931	2003	Spur route; now County Road A21
Iowa 158	0.65	1.05	Iowa 60 near Carlisle	Carlisle	1929	1962	Spur route; now School Street
Iowa 159	1.83	2.95	Iowa 92 near Harper	Harper	1929	1980	Spur route; now County Road V67
Iowa 160	0.82	1.32	Wild Cat Den State Park	US 61	1930	1947	Renumbered Iowa 389 so Iowa 160 could be reused as a spur of Iowa 60 (this section now Iowa 415)
Iowa 160	2.446	3.936	Iowa 415 at Ankeny	I-35 at Ankeny	1947	current	extended east from US 69 to I-35 in 1980
Iowa 161	1.15	1.85	Iowa 25 in Guthrie County	Springbrook State Park	1938	1944	Renumbered Iowa 384 so Iowa 161 could be reused as a spur of US 61
Iowa 161	0.47	0.76	US 61 in Keokuk	Illinois state line	1944	1951	Replaced by US 136
Iowa 161	1.224	1.970	Iowa 141 at Dedham	Iowa 141 near Dedham	1951	2003	Former route of Iowa 141; now County Roads E60 and N33
Iowa 162	2.660	4.281	Pammel State Park	Iowa 92 in Madison County	1930	1982	Park access road; renumbered Iowa 322 to avoid confusion with nearby US 169
Iowa 162	2.0	3.2	US 18 in Charles City	US 218 in Charles City	2000	2006	Former section of US 218; became part of relocated US 18
Iowa 163	1	1.6	Ambrose A. Call State Park	US 169 near Algona	1930	1934	Park access road; renumbered Iowa 274 when US 163 was designated
Iowa 163	166.270	267.586	US 69 in Des Moines	US 34 at Burlington	1937	current	
Iowa 164	3.79	6.10	US 30 in Boone	Ledges State Park	1930	1990	Park access road; now County Road R27
Iowa 165	4.67	7.52	Lewis and Clark State Park	US 75 in Onawa	1930	1955	Park access road; replaced by an extended Iowa 175
Iowa 165	0.410	0.660	Abbott Drive at Omaha, Neb.	Abbott Drive at Omaha, Neb.	1956	current	Only state highway west of the Missouri River
Iowa 166	0.57	0.92	Hastings	US 34 near Hastings	1930	1980	Spur route; now County Road M16
Iowa 167	3.21	5.17	Doon	US 75 near Doon	1930	1980	Spur route; now Main Street, 3rd Avenue and County Road A44
Iowa 168	2.70	4.35	Iowa 83 near Minden	Shelby	1930	1980	Spur route; now County Road M16
Iowa 169	3	4.8	Elk Horn	Iowa 7 at Kimballton	1930	1930	Spur route; renumbered Iowa 173 when US 169 was created in Iowa
Iowa 170	1.68	2.70	Everly	US 18 near Everly	1930	1974	Spur route, former portion of US 18; now County Road M27
Iowa 171	1	1.6	Wall Lake State Park (now Big Wall Lake Wildlife Area)	US 75 in Onawa	1930	1935	Park access road; now an unnumbered county road
Iowa 171	1.05	1.69	Elberon	Iowa 21 near Elberon	1935	1980	Spur route; now Main Street and County Road E44
Iowa 172	4.23	6.81	Elgin	US 18 in Clermont	1930	1980	Spur route; now County Road W51 and Main, Clermont and Center Streets
Iowa 173	14.680	23.625	Iowa 83 near Atlantic	Iowa 44 at Kimballton	1930	current	Originally a spur route south to Elk Horn; extended in 1980
Iowa 174	3.61	5.81	Farragut	Iowa 2 near Farragut	1930	1976	Spur route; now County Road M16
Iowa 175	221.367	356.256	N-51 at Decatur, Neb	US 63 near Hudson	1930	current	Originally a spur route
Iowa 176	1.21	1.95	Iowa 92 near Cumberland	Cumberland	1930	1972	Spur route; now County Road N28 and Jackson, 1st, and Main Streets
Iowa 177	1	1.6	Carson	US 59 near Carson	1930	1937	Spur route; decommissioned when Iowa 100 (now Iowa 92) extended west through Carson
Iowa 177	3.20	5.15	Iowa 9 near Osage	Mitchell	1937	1980	Spur route; now County Road T28
Iowa 178	0.98	1.58	Iowa 9 near Little Rock	Little Rock	1930	1980	Spur route; now Main Street and Maple Avenue
Iowa 179	0.82	1.32	US 69 near Klemme	Klemme	1930	1980	Spur route; now 168th Street and Main Street
Iowa 180	2.46	3.96	Hayesville	Iowa 149 near Hayesville	1930	1980	Spur route; now County Road G49
Iowa 181	3	4.8	Riverside	US 161 near Riverside	1930	1931	Spur route; replaced by an extended Iowa 22
Iowa 181	9.596	15.443	Iowa 5 / Iowa 92 near Pleasantville	Melcher-Dallas	1931	2003	Spur route; now County Road S45
Iowa 182	11.44	18.41	Iowa 9 in Lansing	MN 26 at New Albin	1930	1968	Swapped with Iowa 26
Iowa 182	9.051	14.566	US 18 in Inwood	Iowa 9 near Larchwood	1969	current	Formerly Iowa 26
Iowa 183	29.952	48.203	Iowa 127 near Mondamin	Iowa 141 in Ute	1930	current	Continued south to US 6 until 1981, and to Council Bluffs city limits until 2003
Iowa 184	26	42	Blockton	US 34 near Creston	1930	1932	Spur route; replaced by an extended Iowa 25
Iowa 184	15.026	24.182	US 275 near Randolph	US 59 near Randolph	1934	2003	Originally a spur route from US 275 to Randolph; now County Road J18
Iowa 185	1.51	2.43	Iowa 14 near Conrad	Conrad	1934	1978	Spur route; now County Road D67
Iowa 186	3.27	5.26	US 34 near Prescott	Prescott	1930	1980	Spur route; now County Road N61 and 6th Avenue
Iowa 186	3.375	5.432	Green Valley State Park	Iowa 25 in Creston	1980	2001	Park access road; now unnumbered county roads (Green Valley Road and 130th Street) and Lincoln Street
Iowa 187	9	14	Iowa 10 in Alton	Hospers	1930	1931	Spur route; replaced by Iowa 33
Iowa 187	28.385	45.681	US 20 near Masonville	Iowa 150 near Fayette	1931	current	Originally was a park access road to Backbone State Park; moved to current route in 1980
Iowa 188	26	42	US 52 / Iowa 10 at Luxemburg	US 161 at Cascade	1930	1938	Replaced by an extended Iowa 136
Iowa 188	13	21	US 71 at Auburn	Iowa 17 near Lake City	1938	1940	Formerly No. 35 and Iowa 151; replaced by an extended Iowa 175
Iowa 188	24.231	38.996	Iowa 3 near Clarksville	US 63 near Tripoli	1945	current	
Iowa 189	1.00	1.61	Bridgewater	Iowa 92 north or Bridgwater	1930	1980	Spur route; now County Road N51
Iowa 190	10	16	Ashton	Iowa 9 in Sibley	1930	1931	Spur route; replaced by Iowa 33
Iowa 190	7.46	12.01	Fairbank	Iowa 150 near Oelwein	1931	1980	Replaced by Iowa 281
Iowa 191	22.790	36.677	I-680 near Neola	Iowa 37 at Earling	1930	current	continued south to US 6 until 1981, and to Council Bluffs city limits until 2003
Iowa 192	10	16	US 75 in Sloan	Iowa 141 near Hornick	1930	1931	Became part of an extended Iowa 140
Iowa 192	5.090	8.192	I-29 / I-80 at Council Bluffs	I-29 at Council Bluffs	1931	2017	Renumbered from Iowa 241; was decommissioned in 1975, but restored in 1980; truncated in 2016; now city streets
Iowa 193	10.852	17.465	US 18 in Fayette County	Iowa 24 in Jackson Junction	1930	2003	Now County Road V68
Iowa 194	0.86	1.38	Iowa 2 in Clarinda	Clarinda Treatment Center	1930	1958	Hospital access road; now 16th Street
Iowa 195	3	4.8	US 69 in Jewell	Ellsworth	1930	1935	Spur route; became part of an extended Iowa 175
Iowa 195	2.896	4.661	Iowa 4 near Plover	Plover	1935	2003	Spur route; now County Road C15
Iowa 196	1	1.6	US 20 near Williams	Williams	1930	1932	Was proposed to replace part of US 20, which was to be shifted south, but the plan to relocate US 20 was abandoned in 1932; portion now County Road D25
Iowa 196	10.136	16.312	US 71 / Iowa 175 near Lake View	US 20 near Sac City	1935	2015	Replaced by a rerouted US 71
Iowa 197	7	11	Stratford	Iowa 60 near Stanhope	1930	1937	Spur route; became part of an extended Iowa 175
Iowa 197	2.567	4.131	Iowa 3 near Albert City	Albert City	1937	2003	Spur route; now Main Street and County Road N14
Iowa 198	2.231	3.590	Garrison	US 218 near Garrison	1930	2003	Spur route, section in Garrison removed 1980; now County Road V66
Iowa 199	2.666	4.291	Van Horne	US 218 near Van Horne	1930	2003	Spur route, section in Van Horne removed 1980; now County Road E44
Iowa 200	2.163	3.481	US 30 near Keystone	Keystone	1930	2003	Spur route, section in Keystone removed 1980; now County Road V42
Iowa 201	4.755	7.652	Norway	US 30 / US 218 near Atkins	1930	2003	Spur route; now County Road W24
Iowa 202	8.13	13.08	US 218	Shellsburg	1930	1967	Spur route; became a county road (now numbered E36)
Iowa 202	10.461	16.835	Route 202 at Coatsville, Mo	Iowa 2 near Moulton	1969	current	Formerly Iowa 142
Iowa 203	8.78	14.13	Terril	Iowa 9	1930	1980	Spur route; original east-west spur now County Road A34, north-south spur now County Road N14, Main and State streets
Iowa 204	5.407	8.702	Iowa 2 near Garden Grove	Garden Grove	1930	2003	Spur route; now County Roads R20 and J69
Iowa 205	2.927	4.711	US 65 near Milo	Milo	1930	2003	Spur route; now County Road G58
Iowa 206	6.221	10.012	US 65 near Liberty Center	Liberty Center	1930	2003	Spur route; now County Road G76
Iowa 207	3.058	4.921	I-35 near New Virginia	New Virginia	1930	2003	Spur route; now County Road G76
Iowa 208	14	23	US 20	Backbone State Park	1930	1931	Park access road; renumbered Iowa 187
Iowa 208	11.83	19.04	Iowa 2	Blanchard	1931	1974	Spur route; now County Road M48
Iowa 209	0.66	1.06	Iowa 149 near Conroy	Conroy	1931	1976	Spur route; now County Road F34
Iowa 210	34.781	55.975	Iowa 141 near Woodward	US 65 near Collins	1931	current	Originally a double spur route from Slater to Maxwell; extended in 1980
Iowa 211	1.63	2.62	Cambridge	Iowa 210 near Cambridge	1931	1980	Spur route; now County Road R70
Iowa 212	20	32	Iowa 8 in Dysart	US 30 in Belle Plaine	1931	1933	Replaced by an extended Iowa 73, which was renumbered Iowa 212 9 months later; this portion became part of Iowa 21 a month later
Iowa 212	12.157	19.565	Iowa 21 near Belle Plaine	US 6 at Marengo	1934	current	continued northwest to US 30 from 1937 to 1980
Iowa 213	3.72	5.99	Blakesburg	US 34 north of Blakesburg	1931	1980	Spur route; now County Road T61
Iowa 214	5.736	9.231	Iowa 175 near Ivester	Wellsburg	1931	2003	Spur route; now County Road T19
Iowa 215	8.738	14.062	Union	Iowa 175 in Eldora	1931	2003	Spur route; now County Road S62
Iowa 216	1.70	2.74	Iowa 5	Exline	1931	1981	Spur route; now County Road T16
Iowa 217	4.96	7.98	Breda	US 71	1931	1989	Spur route; now County Road E16
Iowa 219	1.53	2.46	Iowa 9 near Lake Park	Lake Park	1931	1980	Spur route; now County Road M27
Iowa 220	7.233	11.640	US 6 at South Amana	US 151 at Amana	1931	current	Continued east to East Amana and south to Upper South Amana until 1980
Iowa 221	11	18	US 71 near Albert City	Albert City	1931	1937	Spur route; became a county road (now numbered C29)
Iowa 221	42.61	68.57	Iowa 5 near Cherokee	Iowa 17 / Iowa 10 at Pocahontas	1937	1945	Extended in both directions and renumbered Iowa 3
Iowa 221	3.909	6.291	I-35 near Story City	Roland	1947	2003	Spur route, section from I-35 to US 69 removed 1980; now County Road E18
Iowa 222	15.12	24.33	Iowa 15 near Ottosen	Livermore	1931	1980	Spur route; now County Road C20
Iowa 223	12.22	19.67	Iowa 330 near Baxter	Iowa 14 near Baxter	1931	1997	Originally a spur route, extended west from Baxter in 1980; now County Road F17
Iowa 224	10.587	17.038	US 6 near Kellogg	Iowa 14 near Laurel	1931	current	Originally a spur route; extended north from Kellogg in 1980
Iowa 225	7.688	12.373	Sully	Iowa 146 in Searsboro	1931	2003	Spur route; now County Road F62
Iowa 226	10.78	17.35	US 18	Titonka	1931	1980	Spur route; now County Road P64
Iowa 227	5.39	8.67	US 218 near Stacyville	Stacyville	1931	1991	Spur route; now County Road T40
Iowa 228	0.85	1.37	US 6 (this section became County Road F58 in 2003) near Walcott	Walcott	1931	1964	Spur route; now Main Street
Iowa 229	5.233	8.422	Garwin	US 63 in Tama County	1931	2003	Spur route; now County Road E29
Iowa 230	1	1.6	Sergeant Bluff	US 75 near Sergeant Bluff	1931	1934	Spur route; decommissioned because US 75 was rerouted through Sergeant Bluff, and Iowa 230 was reassigned to the old route of US 75; part later restored as Iowa 378 in 1942
Iowa 230	8.60	13.84	US 75 near Sergeant Bluff	US 75 in Sioux City	1934	1965	Spur route; now Transit Avenue, Morningside Avenue, Lakeport Road and a county road (now numbered K29)
Iowa 231	1.83	2.95	Iowa 10 near Ireton	Ireton	1931	1981	Spur route; now County Road K30 and 4th Street
Iowa 231	4.068	6.547	US 34 west of New London	US 34 east of New London	2000	2003	Former section of US 34, unsigned; now Main Street
Iowa 232	1.99	3.20	Earlham	I-80 near Earlham	1931	1980	Spur route; now County Road P57
Iowa 233	5.30	8.53	Albion	Iowa 14 near Rhodes	1931	1989	Spur route; became part of relocated Iowa 330
Iowa 234	6.72	10.81	US 30 in State Center	Iowa 330 near Rhodes	1931	1994	Originally a spur route; only the section north of CR E63 remained after 1989; now an unnumbered county road
Iowa 235	3	4.8	Iowa 234 near Rhodes	Rhodes	1931	1935	Spur route; became an unnumbered county road (now 285th Street)
Iowa 235	1.24	2.00	Rhodes	Iowa 234 near Rhodes	1935	1966	Spur route; renumbered Iowa 245 when I-235 was designated
Iowa 236	1.18	1.90	Templeton	US 71 / Iowa 141 near Templeton	1931	1987	Spur route; now local roads (Main and 2nd Streets) and County Road N18
Iowa 237	1.41	2.27	Iowa 9 near Ocheyedan	Ocheyedan	1931	1981	Spur route; section in Ocheyedan removed in 1980; now County Road L58
Iowa 238	1.063	1.711	Iowa 9 near Harris	Harris	1931	2003	Spur route; was decommissioned in 1981, but was restored in 1987; now County Road M20
Iowa 239	0.510	0.821	Waubonsie State Park	Iowa 2 in Fremont County	1931	2003	Park access road; now County Road L48
Iowa 240	6.389	10.282	Royal	US 71 in Clay County	1931	2003	Spur route; now Main Street, County Roads M36 and B40
Iowa 241	5	8.0	US 34 / US 275 at Council Bluffs	US 34 / US 275	1931	1931	Renumbered Iowa 192
Iowa 241	0.99	1.59	Readlyn	Iowa 3 near Readlyn	1931	1980	Spur route; now local roads
Iowa 242	5.855	9.423	US 34 in Mills County	Silver City	1931	2003	Spur route; now County Road L55
Iowa 243	7.97	12.83	Iowa 140 near Kingsley	Pierson	1931	1980	Spur route; now County Road D12
Iowa 243	0.559	0.900	Black Hawk Lake State Park	US 71 / Iowa 175 near Wall Lake	1980	2003	Park access road; now an unnumbered county road
Iowa 244	1.96	3.15	Henderson	US 59	1931	1980	Spur route; now County Roads H12 and M21 and Maple Street
Iowa 244	0.771	1.241	I-80 near Neola	Iowa 191 in Neola	1980	2003	Now County Road L55
Iowa 245	1.54	2.48	Iowa 9 near Estherville	Fort Defiance State Park	1931	1961	Park access road; became a county road (now numbered N26)
Iowa 245	1.24	2.00	Rhodes	Iowa 234 near Rhodes	1966	1990	Spur route; portion outside of Rhodes removed in 1989; now County Road E63
Iowa 246	3.26	5.25	US 61 in Zwingle	La Motte	1931	1981	Spur route; section outside La Motte deleted in 1980; now County Road D55 and city streets
Iowa 247	0.68	1.09	Chelsea	Iowa 212 near Chelsea	1931	1963	Spur route; became a county road (now numbered V18)
Iowa 248	0.54	0.87	Independence State Hospital	US 20 in Independence	1931	1980	Hospital access road; now 20th Avenue SW
Iowa 249	0.665	1.070	Iowa 78 near Winfield	Winfield	1931	2003	Spur route; now County Road V66
Iowa 250	0.59	0.95	Lakota	US 169 / Iowa 9 near Lakota	1932	1980	Spur route; now a local road
Iowa 251	1.71	2.75	St. Charles	I-35 near St. Charles	1932	1980	Spur route; now County Road G50
Iowa 252	0.584	0.940	US 61 / Iowa 92 near Grandview	Grandview	1932	2003	Spur route
Iowa 253	0.932	1.500	Iowa 14 near Williamson	Williamson	1932	2003	Spur route
Iowa 254	0.45	0.72	Iowa 92 at Massena	Massena	1932	1968	Spur route; renumbered Iowa 322
Iowa 254	7.91	12.73	Iowa 9 near Buffalo Center	MN 254 near Rake	1969	1980	Spur route; formerly Iowa 322
Iowa 254	2.7	4.3	dead end northwest of Nashua	dead end southeast of Nashua	2003	2004	Former section of US 218
Iowa 255	2.26	3.64	Orchard	US 218 near Orchard	1932	1980	Spur route
Iowa 256	0.80	1.29	Iowa 17 near Corwith	Corwith	1932	1980	Spur route
Iowa 257	0.58	0.93	US 18 near Dickens	Dickens	1933	1960	Spur route
Iowa 258	1.989	3.201	I-35 near Van Wert	US 69 near Van Wert	1933	2003	Originally a spur route
Iowa 259	1.001	1.611	US 169 near Tingley	Tingley	1933	2003	Spur route; section in Tingley removed 1980
Iowa 260	2.12	3.41	Shannon City	US 169 near Shannon City	1933	1977	Spur route
Iowa 261	33.02	53.14	Iowa 1 in Iowa City	US 151	1930	1962	Numbered as a branch of US 161; replaced by relocated Iowa 1
Iowa 262	1.99	3.20	US 69 near Galt	Galt	1933	1980	Spur route
Iowa 263	2.14	3.44	Coulter	Latimer	1933	1980	Double spur route with Iowa 3
Iowa 263	12.511	20.135	Iowa 14 in Grundy County	US 20 near Cedar Falls	2000	2003	Former section of US 20
Iowa 264	2.39	3.85	Linn Grove	Iowa 10 near Linn Grove	1933	1980	Spur route
Iowa 265	2.08	3.35	Kent	US 34 near Kent	1934	1961	Spur route
Iowa 266	1.709	2.750	US 69 near Weldon	Weldon	1934	2003	Spur route; section in Weldon removed 1980
Iowa 267	1.19	1.92	Iowa 93 near Randalia	Randalia	1934	1980	Spur route
Iowa 268	6.29	10.12	US 59 near Irwin	Irwin	1934	1971	Spur route; became part of an extended Iowa 37
Iowa 269	3.01	4.84	Iowa 16 near Stockport	Stockport	1934	1980	Spur route
Iowa 270	1.80	2.90	Iowa 16 near Hillsboro	Hillsboro	1934	1980	Spur route
Iowa 271	7	11	Marne	US 71 in Atlantic	1934	1935	Spur route; replaced by an extended Iowa 83
Iowa 271	0.84	1.35	Iowa 4 near Yale	Yale	1935	1980	Spur route
Iowa 272	6.45	10.38	Elma	US 63 near Elma	1934	1992	Spur route; formerly Iowa 52
Iowa 273	10.025	16.134	Lake Wapello State Park	US 63 near Drakesville	1935	2003	Park access road
Iowa 274	1.99	3.20	Ambrose A. Call State Park	US 169 near Algona	1934	1986	Park access road; formerly Iowa 163
Iowa 276	4.711	7.582	Spirit Lake city limits	Minnesota state line	1934	2003	Park access road
Iowa 277	6.24	10.04	Numa	Iowa 5 near Centerville	1935	1980	Spur route
Iowa 278	2.05	3.30	Rathbun	Iowa 5 near Rathbun	1935	1980	Spur route
Iowa 279	1.983	3.191	US 30 / US 218 near Atkins	Atkins	1935	2003	Spur route; section in Atkins removed 1980
Iowa 280	2.62	4.22	US 30 / US 218 near Newhall	Newhall	1935	1965	Spur route; renumbered Iowa 287 when I-280 was designated
Iowa 281	28.166	45.329	Waterloo city limits	Iowa 150 at Oelwein	1935	current	Originally a spur route east to Dunkerton; extended in 1980
Iowa 282	5.283	8.502	Quasqueton	Iowa 939 near Winthrop	1935	2003	Spur route
Iowa 283	5.861	9.432	Brandon	Iowa 150 near Brandon	1935	2003	Spur route
Iowa 284	5.58	8.98	Aurora	Iowa 187 at Lamont	1935	1980	Spur route
Iowa 285	0.796	1.281	US 30 in Arcadia	Arcadia	1935	2003	Spur route
Iowa 286	9.932	15.984	US 30 in Glidden	Lanesboro	1935	2003	Spur route
Iowa 287	7.52	12.10	Farnhamville	Iowa 47 in Farnhamville	1935	1940	Spur route; replaced by an extended Iowa 175
Iowa 287	6.19	9.96	Bradgate	Iowa 3 in Gilmore City	1942	1965	Spur route
Iowa 287	1.833	2.950	US 30 / US 218 near Newhall	Newhall	1965	2003	Spur route; section in Newhall removed 1980
Iowa 288	4.58	7.37	US 65 near Manly	Plymouth	1935	1980	Spur route
Iowa 289	6.14	9.88	Alta Vista	US 63 near Lourdes	1935	1980	Spur route
Iowa 289	2.252	3.624	US 61 near Fort Madison	US 61 near Fort Madison	2000	2003	Former section of US 61 southwest of Fort Madison; had two sections
Iowa 290	1.99	3.20	Farmersburg	Iowa 13 near Farmersburg	1935	1980	Spur route
Iowa 291	1.01	1.63	Low Moor	US 30 near Low Moor	1935	1979	Spur route
Iowa 292	3.17	5.10	Linden	Iowa 44	1935	1980	Spur route
Iowa 293	1.42	2.29	Iowa 90 near Van Meter	Van Meter	1935	1980	Spur route
Iowa 294	6.147	9.893	Iowa 2 in Decatur County	Grand River	1935	2003	Spur route
Iowa 295	5.09	8.19	Westgate	Iowa 150 near Maynard	1935	1980	Spur route
Iowa 296	4.44	7.15	CR C24 near Wadena	Iowa 56 near Wadena	1935	1980	Spur route
Iowa 296	0.275	0.443	—	—	2000	2011	Former section of Iowa 28
Iowa 297	4.25	6.84	Alexander	Iowa 10	1935	1939	Spur route; replaced by an extended Iowa 107
Iowa 297	3.543	5.702	Gilbertville	Raymond	1940	2003	Double spur with I-380
Iowa 298	4.22	6.79	Iowa 60 near Kamrar	Kamrar	1935	1966	Spur route; until 1958 went from US 69 to Kamrar
Iowa 299	5.556	8.942	New Providence	Iowa 175 near Eldora	1935	2003	Spur route
Iowa 300	1.411	2.271	Modale	I-29 near Modale	1935	2003	Spur route
Iowa 301	2.045	3.291	I-29 near Little Sioux	Little Sioux	1935	2003	Spur route
Iowa 302	3.00	4.83	Thor	Iowa 3 near Thor	1935	1980	Spur route
Iowa 303	3.51	5.65	US 34 near Fairfield	Libertyville	1935	1981	Spur route
Iowa 304	1.59	2.56	Iowa 78 near Ollie	Ollie	1935	1980	Spur route
Iowa 305	2.554	4.110	Letts	US 61 / Iowa 92 near Letts	1935	2003	Spur route
Iowa 306	0.783	1.260	US 65 near Derby	Derby	1935	2003	Spur route
Iowa 307	5.31	8.55	US 169 near East Peru	East Peru	1935	1975	Spur route; decommissioned when US 169 was rerouted south of Winterset
Iowa 308	7.32	11.78	US 63 near New Sharon	Barnes City	1935	1966	Spur route
Iowa 309	2.32	3.73	Beacon	Iowa 137 in Oskaloosa	1935	1980	Spur route
Iowa 310	1.68	2.70	Iowa 92 near Harvey	Harvey	1935	1966	Spur route
Iowa 311	4.73	7.61	Liscomb	Iowa 14 near Liscomb	1935	1989	Spur route; section in Liscomb removed 1980
Iowa 312	6.19	9.96	Iowa 9 near Riceville	McIntire	1935	1980	Spur route
Iowa 312	0.883	1.421	—	—	2002	2003	Former section of US 65; had two sections
Iowa 313	1.591	2.560	US 59 near Melvin	Melvin	1935	2002	Spur route; section in Melvin removed 1980
Iowa 314	6.277	10.102	Ayrshire	US 18 near Ruthven	1935	2003	Spur route
Iowa 315	4.158	6.692	Iowa 4 near Palmer	Palmer	1935	2003	Spur route
Iowa 316	5.183	8.341	Iowa 5 near Swan	Runnells city limits	1935	current	Spur route; continued south to Iowa 163 from 1981 to 2003
Iowa 317	0.71	1.14	US 65 near Zearing	Zearing	1935	1980	Spur route; continued west to McCallsburg until 1954
Iowa 318	5.51	8.87	Clutier	Iowa 21 near Clutier	1935	1980	Spur route
Iowa 319	0.50	0.80	Gravity	Iowa 148 at Gravity	1935	1980	Spur route; continued east to Conway until 1961
Iowa 320	4.25	6.84	US 169 near Badger	Badger	1935	1963	Spur route
Iowa 321	6.03	9.70	Clare	Iowa 5 near Clare	1935	1963	Spur route
Iowa 322	7.91	12.73	Iowa 9 near Buffalo Center	MN 254 near Rake	1935	1968	Spur route; renumbered Iowa 254
Iowa 322	0.45	0.72	Iowa 92 at Massena	Massena	1969	1972	Spur route; formerly Iowa 254
Iowa 322	2.660	4.281	Pammel State Park	Iowa 92 in Madison County	1982	2003	Park access road; formerly Iowa 162
Iowa 323	3.74	6.02	Iowa 17 near Woolstock	Woolstock	1935	1980	Spur route
Iowa 324	0.79	1.27	Lawton	US 20 near Lawton	1935	1954	Spur route; decommissioned when US 20 was rerouted closer to Lawton
Iowa 324	0.510	0.821	Iowa 175 near Onawa	Lewis and Clark State Park	1956	2003	Park access road
Iowa 325	3.617	5.821	Spillville	US 52 near Calmar	1935	2003	Spur route; section in Spillville removed 1980
Iowa 326	2.18	3.51	Bristow	Iowa 3 near Bristow	1935	1981	Spur route
Iowa 327	2.070	3.331	Iowa 276 in Spirit Lake	near Orleans	1935	2003	Spur route
Iowa 328	2.29	3.69	US 20 near Galva	Galva	1935	1980	Spur route
Iowa 329	4.85	7.81	US 169 at Boxholm	Pilot Mound	1935	1980	Spur route
Iowa 330	2.31	3.72	Ionia	US 18 near Ionia	1935	1948	Spur route; renumbered Iowa 393 so Iowa 330 could be reused as a spur of US 30
Iowa 330	47.748	76.843	I-80 / US 6 / US 65 at Altoona	Iowa 14 near Albion	1948	current	Originally went from US 30 to Marshalltown; extended west in 1969 and was relocated to bypass Marshalltown in 1989
Iowa 331	1.83	2.95	Eldridge	US 61 near Eldridge	1935	1967	Spur route
Iowa 331	3.801	6.117	Dead end near I-35 in Des Moines	Iowa 28 in Des Moines	2002	2005	Former section of Iowa 5
Iowa 332	1.00	1.61	Pilot Knob State Park	Iowa 9 near Forest City	1935	1980	Park access road
Iowa 333	1.558	2.507	I-29 at Hamburg	US 275 in Hamburg	1935	current	Originally a spur route; section from county line to US 71 removed 1980; reassigned to current route that year, but section from US 275 to US 59 removed 2003
Iowa 334	1.87	3.01	US 63 near Frederika	Frederika	1935	1980	Spur route
Iowa 334	6.600	10.622	—	—	2006	2007	Former section of US 34
Iowa 335	0.64	1.03	Iowa 141 near Dawson	Dawson	1935	1980	Spur route
Iowa 335	1.536	2.472	Iowa 163 in Otley	Iowa 163 in Otley	1999	2001	Former section of Iowa 163
Iowa 336	2.48	3.99	Iowa 150 near Rowley	Rowley	1936	1980	Spur route
Iowa 337	3.36	5.41	Iowa 9 near Grafton	Grafton	1936	1980	Spur route
Iowa 337	2.764	4.448	US 218 in Charles City	US 18 in Charles City	2000	2001	Former section of US 218
Iowa 337	1.085	1.746	US 151 in Langworthy	US 151 in Langworthy	2003	2004	Former section of US 151
Iowa 338	1.02	1.64	Bondurant	US 65	1936	1972	Spur route
Iowa 339	6.15	9.90	George	Iowa 9 near George	1936	2000	Spur route
Iowa 340	2.231	3.590	Pikes Peak State Park	Iowa 76 in McGregor	1936	2003	Park access road
Iowa 340	1.160	1.867	Dead end in Batavia	US 34 in Batavia	2005	2007	Former section of US 34
Iowa 341	2.10	3.38	Lost Island Park	US 18 near Ruthven	1936	1988	Park access road
Iowa 341	0.062	0.100	Ruthven	US 18 near Ruthven	1993	2003	Spur route; restoration of part of the previous Iowa 341
Iowa 342	0.95	1.53	Iowa 141 near Jamaica	Jamaica	1936	1980	Spur route
Iowa 342	2.2	3.5	Dead end north of Eddyville	Iowa 137 in Eddyville	2004	2005	Former section of US 63
Iowa 343	1.01	1.63	Iowa 333 near Northboro	Northboro	1937	1980	Spur route
Iowa 344	7.06	11.36	Iowa 2 in Bedford	Iowa 319 near Conway	1937	1943	Park access road; became part of an extended Iowa 49
Iowa 344	1.075	1.730	State fish hatchery	US 169 near Mount Ayr	1943	2001	Fish hatchery access road
Iowa 345	0.42	0.68	Iowa 17 near Graettinger	Graettinger	1937	1960	Spur route
Iowa 346	12.470	20.069	US 218 / Iowa 27 at Nashua	US 18 / US 63 near New Hampton	1937	current	
Iowa 347	1.08	1.74	Locust Street at Omaha, Neb.	Locust Street at Omaha, Neb.	1937	1986	
Iowa 348	0.88	1.42	Iowa 347	Carter Lake	1937	1967	
Iowa 349	1.032	1.661	Lake Ahquabi State Park	US 65 / US 69 near Indianola	1938	2003	Park access road
Iowa 350	2.55	4.10	US 6 near Davenport	Iowa 122 in Davenport	1938	1958	Now Hickory Grove Road
Iowa 351	0.86	1.38	Rembrandt	US 71 near Rembrandt	1938	1981	Spur route; section in Rembrandt removed 1980
Iowa 352	0.75	1.21	Truesdale	US 71 near Truesdale	1938	1981	Spur route; section in Truesdale removed 1980
Iowa 353	0.35	0.56	Rowan	Iowa 3 at Rowan	1938	1980	Spur route
Iowa 354	0.35	0.56	Mallard	Iowa 17 near Mallard	1938	1960	Spur route
Iowa 355	0.33	0.53	Iowa 175 near Radcliffe	Radcliffe	1938	1961	Spur route
Iowa 356	6.37	10.25	Packwood	Iowa 1 near Packwood	1938	1981	Spur route; section in Packwood removed 1980
Iowa 356	0.949	1.527	Milford	West Okoboji	2000	2003	Former section of US 71
Iowa 357	0.59	0.95	Blockton	Iowa 25 near Blockton	1938	1964	Spur route
Iowa 358	1.55	2.49	Whittemore	US 18 / Iowa 15 near Whittemore	1938	1980	Spur route
Iowa 359	7.383	11.882	Buckeye	Iowa 941 in Alden	1938	2003	Spur route
Iowa 360	0.64	1.03	Iowa 5 near Newell	Newell	1938	1964	Spur route
Iowa 361	0.38	0.61	Bayard	Iowa 25 near Bayard	1938	1962	Spur route
Iowa 362	1.17	1.88	Macedonia	US 59 near Macedonia	1938	1980	Spur route
Iowa 362	5.469	8.802	DeSoto National Wildlife Refuge	I-29 at Loveland	1980	2003	Park access road
Iowa 363	1.616	2.601	Iowa 150 near Urbana	I-380 / Iowa 27 in Urbana	1939	2003	Spur route; formerly Iowa 92; rerouted to end at I-380 in 1984
Iowa 364	6.140	9.881	Iowa 76 near Waukon Junction	Harpers Ferry	1938	2003	Spur route; section north of the bridge in Harpers Ferry removed 1980
Iowa 365	1.07	1.72	Tracy	Iowa 964 near Tracy	1939	1980	Spur route; did not extend to relocated Iowa 92 when Iowa 92 was rerouted in 1978
Iowa 366	0.51	0.82	US 75 near Blencoe	Blencoe	1939	1964	Spur route
Iowa 367	6	9.7	Nebraska border	US 275 in Council Bluffs	1939	1941	Replaced by US 275
Iowa 367	3.39	5.46	Rutland	US 169 near Humboldt	1942	1980	Spur route
Iowa 368	0.50	0.80	Renwick	Iowa 60 near Renwick	1939	1964	Spur route
Iowa 368	0.140	0.225	200th Avenue northwest of Hartford	Dead end	2002	current	Former section of Iowa 5
Iowa 369	2	3.2	Iowa 92 near Knoxville	Coal mine	1939	1941	Now County Road T17
Iowa 369	5.54	8.92	Iowa 2 near Moulton	Unionville	1942	1980	Spur route
Iowa 370	0.46	0.74	Iowa 57	Dike	1939	1952	Spur route
Iowa 370	3.265	5.255	N-370 at Bellevue, Neb.	I-29 / US 275 near Council Bluffs	1953	2014	Originally ended at US 275 (pre-2003 route); decommissioned in 1980, but restored west of I-29 in 1983
Iowa 371	0.715	1.151	Lake Keomah State Park	Iowa 92 near Keomah Village	1939	2003	Park access road
Iowa 372	2.60	4.18	Preparation Canyon State Park	Iowa 183 near Moorhead	1939	1968	Park access road
Iowa 373	4.05	6.52	Iowa 13 near Waterville	Waterville	1942	1964	Spur route
Iowa 373	2.307	3.713	—	—	2002	2003	Former section of US 61 just southwest of Muscatine
Iowa 374	7.99	12.86	US 71 near Sioux Rapids	Webb	1942	1980	Spur route
Iowa 374	3.6	5.8	Iowa 163 in Monroe	Dead end in Monroe	2000	2000	Former section of Iowa 163
Iowa 375	2.95	4.75	US 6 in Council Bluffs	US 275 / Iowa 92 in Council Bluffs	1941	1971	Now 4th Street, 9th Avenue, 3rd Street, and Harry Langdon Boulevard
Iowa 376	0.46	0.74	Iowa 3 near Colesburg	Colesburg	1942	1965	Spur route
Iowa 376	10.334	16.631	I-129 / US 20 / US 75 at Sioux City	US 75 at Sioux City	2001	current	US 75 Business in Sioux City
Iowa 377	0.55	0.89	Harbor Drive in Sioux City	Iowa 970 in Sergeant Bluff	1942	1980	Airport access road
Iowa 378	2.13	3.43	Harbor Drive in Sioux City	Iowa 475 (later Iowa 970) in Sergeant Bluff	1942	1974	Airport access road
Iowa 379	4.59	7.39	Joice	Iowa 105 near Lake Mills	1942	1980	Spur route
Iowa 380	1.30	2.09	Ottumwa Regional Airport	US 63 near Ottumwa	1943	1969	Renumbered Iowa 389 when I-380 was designated
Iowa 381	1.10	1.77	Iowa 84 near Cedar Rapids	US 218 (now Club Road) near Cedar Rapids	1943	1953	Airport access road; now Wright Brothers Boulevard
Iowa 381	0.67	1.08	Iowa 254 near Rake	Rake	1954	1980	Spur route
Iowa 382	4.792	7.712	Lake MacBride State Park	Iowa 1 in Solon	1943	2003	Park access road
Iowa 383	1.311	2.110	US 69 near Randall	Randall	1944	2003	Spur route
Iowa 384	1.231	1.981	Iowa 25 in Guthrie County	Springbrook State Park	1944	2003	Park access road
Iowa 385	3.151	5.071	Pacific Junction	US 34 / US 275 in Glenwood	1945	2003	Spur route
Iowa 386	2.685	4.321	US 52 / Iowa 3 near Sageville	US 52 / Iowa 3 / Iowa 32 near Dubuque	1946	2003	
Iowa 387	1.04	1.67	US 65 near Zearing	Zearing	1946	1950	Spur route; replaced by an extended Iowa 317
Iowa 387	0.52	0.84	Davenport Municipal Airport	US 61 3 miles north of Davenport	1951	1979	Airport access road
Iowa 388	0.35	0.56	Calumet	US 59 at Calumet	1946	1980	Spur route
Iowa 389	0.82	1.32	Wild Cat Den State Park	Iowa 22	1946	1962	Park access road
Iowa 389	1.25	2.01	Ottumwa Regional Airport	US 63 near Ottumwa	1969	1997	Decommissioned when the first section of Ottumwa bypass opened
Iowa 390	0.74	1.19	Marathon	Iowa 10 near Marathon	1946	1980	Spur route
Iowa 390	2.113	3.401	South of Plainfield	North of Plainfield	2002	2003	Former section of US 218
Iowa 391	0.50	0.80	Clinton Municipal Airport	US 30 near Clinton	1946	1972	Airport access road; now 60th Street
Iowa 392	0.63	1.01	Dubuque Regional Airport	US 61 near Dubuque	1946	1974	Airport access road; now Airport Road
Iowa 392	3.09	4.97	Iowa 163 in Prairie City	Iowa 163 in Prairie City	1998	2000	Former section of Iowa 163
Iowa 393	2.40	3.86	Ionia	US 18 near Ionia	1948	1980	Spur route
Iowa 394	2.27	3.65	Iowa 2 near Denmark	Iowa Army Ammunition Plant southern entrance	1948	1980	Spur route
Iowa 394	10.454	16.824	Route B at St. Francisville, Mo.	US 218 near Donnellson	1980	2005	Replaced by Iowa 27
Iowa 395	0.53	0.85	Iowa 330 near Melbourne	Melbourne	1948	1983	Spur route; section in Melbourne removed 1980
Iowa 396	0.89	1.43	Iowa 14 in Newton	US 6 in Newton	1948	1954	Now 19th Avenue and 8th Street
Iowa 396	0.52	0.84	Iowa 175 near Farnhamville	Farnhamville	1954	1980	Spur route
Iowa 397	0.69	1.11	Paton	Iowa 144 near Paton	1948	1991	Spur route
Iowa 398	1.24	2.00	Brooklyn	US 6 near Brooklyn	1956	1980	Spur route
Iowa 399	0.65	1.05	Iowa 74 near Palo	Palo	1956	1964	Spur route
Iowa 400	4.54	7.31	Truro	I-35 near Truro	1957	1980	Spur route; not completed until 1958
Iowa 401	5.32	8.56	Camp Dodge	US 6 in Des Moines	1958	1991	Replaced by an extended Iowa 28 south of I-80; rest decommissioned
Iowa 402	20.9	33.6	Iowa 8 near Dysart	Iowa 412 in Waterloo	1957	1968	Replaced by Iowa 21
Iowa 403	0.70	1.13	Cushing	US 20 near Cushing	1958	1980	Spur route
Iowa 403	0.477	0.768	SD 48 near Akron	Iowa 12 in Akron	1980	2003	
Iowa 404	1.391	2.239	Montrose	US 61 near Montrose	1960	2003	Spur route
Iowa 404	1.629	2.622	Iowa 3 in Le Mars	US 75 at Le Mars	2006	current	Section of US 75 Business in Le Mars
Iowa 405	0.249	0.401	Lone Tree	Iowa 22 near Lone Tree	1958	2003	Spur route; section in Lone Tree removed 1980
Iowa 406	2.275	3.661	US 34 near West Burlington	Burlington	1957	2003	Formerly Iowa 80; spur route
Iowa 407	0.47	0.76	Iowa 99 in Oakville	Oakville	1957	1967	Formerly Iowa 7; spur route
Iowa 408	7.40	11.91	US 169 near Lu Verne	Lu Verne	1957	1980	Spur route
Iowa 409	0.41	0.66	US 18 near Garner	Garner	1957	1968	Formerly Iowa 35; spur route
Iowa 410	2.157	3.471	Backbone State Park	Iowa 3 / Iowa 13 near Strawberry Point	1958	2003	Park access road
Iowa 411	0.98	1.58	US 6 at Marengo	CR F15 north of Marengo	1957	1964	Spur route
Iowa 412	4.72	7.60	US 63 in Waterloo	US 218 in Waterloo	1960	1983	San Marnan Drive in Waterloo
Iowa 413	3.95	6.36	US 20 in Fort Dodge	Fort Dodge Airport	1960	1980	Spur route; continued north to Iowa 320 near Badger until Iowa 320 was decommissioned
Iowa 414	6.12	9.85	US 6 near Lewis	US 71 near Atlantic	1958	1972	Former section of Iowa 92; was Iowa 100 for a month in 1958
Iowa 415	16.857	27.129	US 6 in Des Moines	Iowa 141 near Granger	1959	current	
Iowa 416	4.89	7.87	Centralia	US 20	1959	1969	Former section of US 20; sections were renumbered Iowa 418 and Iowa 420 in 1960
Iowa 417	5.38	8.66	US 67 near Riverdale	US 67 near LeClaire	1960	1968	Former section of US 67
Iowa 418	0.85	1.37	Farley	US 20	1960	1968	Former section of US 20
Iowa 419	1.038	1.670	Victor	US 6 / Iowa 21 near Victor	1962	2003	Spur route
Iowa 420	2.37	3.81	Iowa 136 in Dyersville	US 20	1960	1969	Former section of US 20
Iowa 421	3.260	5.246	—	—	2000	2003	Former section of US 61 northeast of Muscatine
Iowa 422	0.52	0.84	US 169 near Burt	Burt	1964	1976	Spur route; renumbered Iowa 969
Iowa 424	0.44	0.71	Iowa 111 in Britt	US 18 near Britt	1961	1980	Spur route
Iowa 424	2.802	4.509	South of Swedesburg	US 218 near Olds	1999	2003	Former section of US 218
Iowa 426	0.52	0.84	Iowa 92 near Rose Hill	Rose Hill	1960	1980	Former section of Iowa 92
Iowa 428	1.21	1.95	Anamosa	US 151 near Anamosa	1965	1980	Spur route
Iowa 428	6.140	9.881	Maquoketa Caves State Park	US 61 near Maquoketa	1980	2003	Park access road
Iowa 431	3.183	5.123	US 218 near Waverly	Iowa 3 in Waverly	1998	2001	Section of US 218 Business in Waverly
Iowa 431	1.920	3.090	US 30 near Le Grand		2004	2014	Former section of US 30
Iowa 432	1.9	3.1	Iowa 163 in Oskaloosa	Iowa 92 in Oskaloosa	1998	2003	Former section of Iowa 163
Iowa 434	8.993	14.473	US 34 in Danville	US 34 in West Burlington	2005	2008	Former section of US 34
Iowa 437	0.299	0.481	Dead end near Iowa 137 in Eddyville	Dead end near Iowa 342 in Eddyville	2005	2008	Former section of Iowa 137; abandoned road
Iowa 438	1.052	1.693	US 34 / Iowa 163 at Mount Pleasant	US 218 / Iowa 27 at Mount Pleasant	2003	current	Section of US 218 Business in Mount Pleasant
Iowa 450	0.268	0.431	Iowa 10 at Alton	Iowa 60 at Alton	2005	current	450th Street
Iowa 460	7.240	11.652	—	—	2004	2007	Former sections of US 218 and Iowa 394 in Donnellson and Argyle
Iowa 461	10.750	17.300	I-280 / US 61 at Davenport	I-80 / US 61 at Davenport	2010	current	US 61 Business in Davenport
Iowa 463	2.3	3.7	US 63 near Frederika	US 63 near Frederika	2009	2010	Former section of US 63
Iowa 470	0.695	1.118	US 75 in Merrill		2011	current	Former section of US 75
Iowa 471	11.160	17.960	Iowa 175 near Lake View	US 20 / US 71 near Early	2015	current	Formerly US 71 in Sac County
Iowa 475	31.79	51.16	Business US 75 in Sioux City	Iowa 175 in Onawa	1969	1976	Former section of US 75; renumbered Iowa 970
Iowa 478	0.755	1.215	Iowa 24 in New Hampton	North of New Hampton	2002	2003	Former section of US 63
Iowa 903	0.13	0.21	Just south of Iowa 163 near Leighton		2011	current	Former section of Iowa 163
Iowa 904	4.737	7.623	US 34 / Iowa 163 west of Fairfield	US 34 / Iowa 163 east of Fairfield	2008	2011	US 34 Business at Fairfield, did not count mileage within Fairfield city limits
Iowa 906	4.009	6.452	Iowa 192 in Council Bluffs	I-80 / US 6 near Council Bluffs	2016	2023	Formerly US 6 through Council Bluffs
Iowa 912	0.22	0.35	—	—	1997	1999	Former section of Iowa 141
Iowa 913	1.686	2.713	—	—	1996	1997	Former section of US 61
Iowa 914	1.01	1.63	Storm Lake city limit boundary	Iowa 7 in Storm Lake	1996	2001	Former section of US 71
Iowa 915	.27	0.43	Iowa 3 / Iowa 150 in Oelwein	Iowa 3 / Iowa 150 in Oelwein	1986	1990	Former section of Iowa 3/Iowa 150 concurrency
Iowa 915	3.7	6.0	—	—	1993	1994	Former section of Iowa 415 in Ankeny
Iowa 915	.580	0.933	Iowa 5 in Albia	Iowa 5 in Albia	1995	1997	Former section of Iowa 5
Iowa 916	1.293	2.081	Iowa 281 in Oelwein	Oelwein city limits	1986	2003	Originally ended at Iowa 915 in Oelwein; former section of Iowa 150
Iowa 917	0.149	0.240	US 61 and Iowa 22 near Muscatine	Muscatine city limits	1986	2003	Former section of Iowa 22
Iowa 918	1.119	1.801	Iowa 16 near Eldon	Iowa 16 in Eldon	1984	2003	Former section of Iowa 16; street signs said "Hwy 918"
Iowa 919	0.39	0.63	Iowa 363 in Urbana	Walnut Street in Urbana	1984	1995	Former section of Iowa 363; now Ash Street and Wood Street
Iowa 920	12.560	20.213	Center Point	Iowa 150 near Urbana	1984	2003	Former section of Iowa 150
Iowa 921	11.75	18.91	Iowa 920 in Center Point	Hiawatha	1984	1985	Former section of Iowa 150
Iowa 921	2.505	4.031	US 6 / Iowa 1 in Iowa City	US 218 in Iowa City	1985	2003	Former section of US 218
Iowa 922	1.27	2.04	US 61 in Muscatine	Iowa 22 in Muscatine	1984	1986	Former section of US 61; became part of an extended Iowa 38
Iowa 922	1.12	1.80	Iowa 149 in North English	unnamed street in North English	1987	1988	Former section of Iowa 149
Iowa 922	8.862	14.262	US 151 at Cedar Rapids	Iowa 100 in Cedar Rapids	1989	current	US 151 Business in Cedar Rapids
Iowa 923	8.819	14.193	—	—	1982	2003	Former section of US 218; had three sections
Iowa 924	4.00	6.44	Iowa 175 near Farnhamville	Webster–Greene County Line	1980	1982	Now County Road P29
Iowa 924	2.24	3.60	US 52 in Dubuque	Dead end in Dubuque	1983	1992	Former section of US 61/US 151 concurrency
Iowa 924	0.665	1.070	US 61 near Montrose	Dead end in Montrose	1994	2003	Formerly Iowa 998; former section of US 61
Iowa 925	26.259	42.260	I-80 / US 6 in Adair	US 6 near Dexter	1980	2003	Former section of US 6
Iowa 926	3.18	5.12	US 6	Altoona east city limit boundary	1980	1988	Former section of US 6; originally continued east to Newton
Iowa 926	3.147	5.065	US 169 / US 20 Bus at Fort Dodge	US 169 at Fort Dodge	1990	2014	
Iowa 927	19.017	30.605	US 6 / Iowa 38 in Wilton	I-280 / US 6 near Davenport	1980	2003	Former section of US 6; was signed in 1989
Iowa 928	20.168	32.457	Iowa 17 near Webster City	CR D20 near Williams	1980	2003	Former section of US 20
Iowa 929	0.789	1.270	Murray city limits	Maple Street in Murray	1980	2003	Former section of Iowa 152
Iowa 930	1.738	2.797	US 30 near Ames	Boone–Story county line	1972	current	Former section of US 30
Iowa 931	1.2	1.9	Iowa 13 in Coggon	Iowa 13 near Coggon	1976	1978	Former section of Iowa 13
Iowa 931	8.962	14.423	I-35 in Ankeny	US 65 in Polk County	1980	2003	
Iowa 932	0.193	0.311	Ryan city limits	Iowa 13 in Ryan	1976	2003	Former section of Iowa 13
Iowa 933	0.74	1.19	Iowa 141 in Perry	Iowa 141 in Perry	1976	1984	Former section of Iowa 141
Iowa 933	0.21	0.34	—	—	1985	1999	Former section of Iowa 58 just south of US 20
Iowa 934	1.07	1.72	US 61 near Burlington	US 61 near Burlington	1976	1980	Former section of US 61; now Memorial Park Road
Iowa 934	1.14	1.83	Dallas–Polk county line	I-35 in Des Moines	1981	1989	Former section of Iowa 90
Iowa 934	4.76	7.66	US 20 near Moorland	US 169 in Fort Dodge	1990	1991	Former section of US 20
Iowa 934	0.19	0.31	—	—	1992	1994	Former section of US 34 just east of Iowa 97, which is now County Road S56
Iowa 934	4.881	7.855	Iowa 58 in Cedar Falls	US 63 in Waterloo	1998	2016	Was an unsigned highway
Iowa 935	0.77	1.24	—	—	1976	1981	Former section of US 34 parallel to Business US 34 in Burlington
Iowa 935	1.492	2.401	I-29	Mills–Pottawattamie county line	1982	2003	Former section of Iowa 370
Iowa 936	0.087	0.140	east city limits of West Burlington	west city limits of Burlington	1976	1995	Former section of Iowa 406
Iowa 936	0.275	0.443	Iowa 92 near Ainsworth	Iowa 923 near Ainsworth	1997	2003	Former section of Iowa 92
Iowa 937	4.23	6.81	Iowa 2 near Bloomfield	Iowa 2 near Bloomfield	1976	1977	Former section of Iowa 2
Iowa 937	0.460	0.740	Iowa 141 near Perry	US 169 near Perry	1977	2003	Former section of Iowa 141
Iowa 938	1.57	2.53	Iowa 947 near Manchester	Manchester Fish Hatchery	1976	1980	Former Iowa 116
Iowa 938	0.460	0.740	Union Street in Unionville	Unionville south city limit boundary	1980	2003	Former section of Iowa 369
Iowa 939	6.76	10.88	US 65	Iowa 2 near Corydon	1976	1980	Former section of Iowa 2
Iowa 939	18.931	30.466	Iowa 187 near Masonville	Black Hawk–Buchanan county line	1980	2003	Former section of US 20
Iowa 940	2.51	4.04	—	—	1976	1980	Former sections of Iowa 2 at County Road S70, County Road T14, and in Centerville
Iowa 940	0.081	0.130	Tama–Benton county line near Belle Plaine	Iowa 21 near Belle Plaine	1981	2003	
Iowa 941	2.99	4.81	County Road J18 in Moravia	Iowa 5 near Moravia	1976	1980	Former section of Iowa 5
Iowa 941	6.38	10.27	US 30 / US 218 in Cedar Rapids	US 30 / US 218 in Cedar Rapids	1981	1987	Former section of US 30/US 218 concurrency
Iowa 941	1.12	1.80	5th Avenue Southwest in Epworth	Bierman Road in Epworth	1988	1990	Former section of US 20
Iowa 941	12.953	20.846	I-35 near Williams	Iowa Falls city limits	1991	2003	Former section of US 20
Iowa 942	5.70	9.17	Iowa 5 near Moravia	County Road J18 in Moravia	1976	1980	Former section of Iowa 5; had another section south of Albia
Iowa 942	0.466	0.750	Vine Street in Woodburn	Woodburn city limits	1980	2003	Former section of Iowa 104
Iowa 943	0.69	1.11	—	—	1974	1980	Former section of Iowa 13 in Central City
Iowa 943	0.43	0.69	1st Street in Galva	Galva city limits	1980	1987	Former section of Iowa 328
Iowa 943	0.48	0.77	—	—	1988	1990	Former Iowa 12 ramp in Sioux City; road destroyed 1990s
Iowa 943	1.82	2.93	US 63 in Denver	US 63 in Denver	1994	1995	Former section of US 63
Iowa 944	0.99	1.59	Iowa 13 in Manchester	Iowa 13 in Manchester	1976	1980	Former section of Iowa 13
Iowa 944	0.553	0.890	US 61 / Iowa 2 in Fort Madison	Fort Madison city limits	1980	2003	Former section of Iowa 88
Iowa 945	4.599	7.401	I-80 near Altoona	Iowa 931 in Polk County	1980	2003	
Iowa 946	2.72	4.38	Luana city limits	US 18 / US 52 in Monona	1976	1980	Former section of US 18/US 52 concurrency; had two sections separated by the city limits of Monona
Iowa 946	0.07	0.11	US 218 in St. Ansgar	Park Street in St. Ansgar	1988	1989	Former section of US 218
Iowa 946	0.927	1.492	US 52 / US 61 / US 151 in Dubuque	US 52 / US 61 / US 151 in Dubuque	1991	current	Provides direct access between US 20 and US 52 / US 61 / US 151
Iowa 947	23.75	38.22	Iowa 187	Dyersville city limits	1976	1981	Former section of US 20
Iowa 947	0.45	0.72	Zearing city limits	Pearl Street in Zearing	1981	1986	Former section of Iowa 317
Iowa 947	4.74	7.63	Iowa 57 in Cedar Falls	Greenhill Road in Waterloo	1989	1992	Former section of US 218
Iowa 947	2.47	3.98	Iowa 70 in Columbus Junction	Market Street in Columbus City	1994	2003	Former section of Iowa 70; only the 0.671 miles in Columbus City were left on December 1, 1997
Iowa 948	5.08	8.18	DeWitt city limits	US 30 near DeWitt	1975	1987	Former section of US 30
Iowa 948	.30	0.48	US 61 / US 151 in Dubuque	Iowa 959 in Dubuque	1992	1993	Former section of US 61/US 151 concurrency
Iowa 949	2.275	3.661	Glenwood city limits	US 34 / US 275 near Glenwood	1974	2003	Formerly US 34 Business
Iowa 950	3.45	5.55	US 6 / US 65 in Altoona	iowa 163 in Pleasant Hill	1980	1994	Now 34th Avenue/56th Street
Iowa 951	2.65	4.26	US 34 west of Osceola	US 34 near Osceola	1976	1980	Former section of US 34
Iowa 951	3.15	5.07	Carbon city limits	Iowa 148	1983	1993	Former Section of Iowa 95
Iowa 952	1.8	2.9	US 61 in Burlington	Central avenue in Burlington	1976	1976	Former section of US 34
Iowa 952	0.18	0.29	—	—	1978	1982	Former section of US 67 north of Clinton
Iowa 952	0.112	0.180	US 151 near Cascade	Reiter Road near Cascade	1992	2003	Former section of US 151
Iowa 953	0.89	1.43	Iowa 38 near Muscatine	Iowa 38 in Muscatine	1976	1980	Former section of Iowa 38
Iowa 953	0.08	0.13	Iowa 149 in North English	Dead end in North English	1988	1994	Former section of Iowa 149
Iowa 953	1.0	1.6	Iowa 5 in West Des Moines	Browns Woods Road in West Des Moines	1995	1996	Former section of Iowa 28
Iowa 954	0.773	1.244	US 61 near Maquoketa	Maquoketa city limits	1967	2003	Former section of US 61; numbered 1976
Iowa 955	0.727	1.170	US 61 near Key West	Iowa 963 (Military Road) in Key West	1971	2003	Former section of US 61
Iowa 956	16.776	26.998	CR F55 at Davenport	US 61 north of DeWitt	1976	2003	Former section of US 61
Iowa 957	3.33	5.36	US 63 near Bloomfield	US 63 near Bloomfield	1976	1977	Former section of US 63
Iowa 957	0.062	0.100	—	—	1988	2003	Former section of Iowa 22
Iowa 958	1.610	2.591	Ottumwa city limits	US 63 south of Ottumwa	1965	2003	Former section of US 63
Iowa 959	1.27	2.04	US 65 / US 69 in Des Moines	Des Moines city limits	1970	1981	Former section of US 65/US 69 concurrency
Iowa 959	1.29	2.08	US 61 / US 151 in Dubuque	US 61 / US 151 & US 52 in Dubuque	1992	1993	Former section of US 61/US 151 concurrency
Iowa 960	1.58	2.54	Clarinda city limits	Iowa 2 near Clarinda	1973	1982	Former section of Iowa 2
Iowa 960	1.11	1.79	—	—	1982	1986	Former section of US 61
Iowa 960	4.7	7.6	—	—	1993	1994	Former section of US 61/US 218 concurrency north of Keokuk
Iowa 960	1.016	1.635	US 75 Business/Iowa 404 in Le Mars	Dead end in Le Mars	2006	2007	Former section of Iowa 60
Iowa 961	0.56	0.90	Villisca city limits	US 71 near Villisca	1976	1980	Former section of US 71
Iowa 961	1.08	1.74	US 61 / US 151 in Dubuque	US 20 in Dubuque (southbound), Iowa 946 in Dubuque (northbound)	1991	1993	Former section of US 151 and US 61
Iowa 961	0.50	0.80	—	—	1994	1996	Former section of US 61 in Wever
Iowa 961	3.613	5.815	Iowa 2 in Fort Madison	US 61 at Fort Madison	2011	2013	Section of US 61 Business in Fort Madison
Iowa 962	0.11	0.18	US 218 near Ainsworth	County Road W64 near Ainsworth	1994	1997	Former section of US 218
Iowa 963	4.139	6.661	US 151 near Key West	US 61 / US 151 in Dubuque	1971	2003	Former section of US 151 and US 61
Iowa 964	4.704	7.570	Iowa 92 near Knoxville	Iowa 92 near Knoxville	1977	1996	Former section of Iowa 92
Iowa 965	3.29	5.29	—	—	1976	1980	Former section of US 52
Iowa 965	0.519	0.835	US 6 in Coralville	I-80 in Coralville	1985	current	Former section of US 218; extended to Cedar Rapids until 2003
Iowa 966	4.89	7.87	Centralia	US 20	1976	1996	Former Iowa 416, and before that, was a section of US 20
Iowa 967	0.037	0.060	US 20 near Farley	Farley city limits	1976	2003	Former Iowa 418, and before that, was a section of US 20
Iowa 968	2.37	3.81	Iowa 136 in Dyersville	US 20	1976	1989	Former Iowa 420, and before that, was a section of US 20
Iowa 968	5.36	8.63	Iowa 163 in Pella	Iowa 163 in Pella	1993	1994	Former section of Iowa 163
Iowa 969	0.52	0.84	US 169 near Burt	Burt	1976	1980	Spur route; former Iowa 422
Iowa 969	4.0	6.4	US 218 near Janesville	US 218 near Janesville	1993	1994	Former section of US 218
Iowa 970	31.79	51.16	Business US 75 in Sioux City	Iowa 175 in Onawa	1976	2003	Former section of US 75
Iowa 971	10.78	17.35	Iowa 2	US 59 in Shenandoah	1975	1979	Former section of Iowa 2
Iowa 971	1.802	2.900	US 69 in Lake Mills	Winnebago–Worth county line	1993	2003	Former section of Iowa 105; only 0.777 miles in Lake Mills were left in 2002
Iowa 972	2.00	3.22	US 218	Mount Pleasant city limits	1969	1974	Former section of US 218; renumbered Iowa 976 to avoid confusion with the other Iowa 972
Iowa 972	2.772	4.461	I-29 / US 34 near Glenwood	Iowa 385 near Pacific Junction	1974	1974	Former section of US 34; renumbered Iowa 978 to avoid confusion with the other Iowa 972
Iowa 972	10.17	16.37	Iowa 92 / US 169 in Winterset	US 169	1974	1980	Former section of US 169
Iowa 972	1.877	3.021	Northwood city limits	Northwood city limits	1993	2003	Former section of Iowa 105
Iowa 973	1.95	3.14	I-29 in Council Bluffs	US 6 in Council Bluffs	1969	1971	Former section of US 75
Iowa 973	10.32	16.61	US 71 near Atlantic	Iowa 148 in Anita	1972	1973	Former section of US 6; became part of an extended Iowa 83
Iowa 973	1.49	2.40	Iowa 92 in Winterset	Iowa 972 in Winterset	1976	1980	Former section of Iowa 92
Iowa 973	0.65	1.05	St. Ansgar city limits	US 218 in St. Ansgar	1993	2001	Former section of Iowa 105
Iowa 974	5.09	8.19	O'Connor Road northwest of Mount Vernon	Mount Vernon city limits	1965	1980	Former section of Iowa 150
Iowa 975	1.33	2.14	North city limits of Marengo	CR F15 north of Marengo	1964	1974	Former section of Iowa 411
Iowa 975	1.55	2.49	Iowa 964 in Knoxville	Iowa 5 / Iowa 92 in Knoxville	1978	1986	Former section of Iowa 5/Iowa 92 concurrency
Iowa 975	0.13	0.21	—	—	1995	1995	Former section of US 275/Iowa 333 concurrency east of Hamburg
Iowa 976	2.00	3.22	US 218	Mount Pleasant city limits	1974	1980	Former section of US 218; formerly Iowa 972
Iowa 976	0.22	0.35	Marshalltown city limits	Governor Road east of Marshalltown	1996	1997	Former section of US 30
Iowa 976	0.879	1.415	—	—	1997	2003	Former section of US 30
Iowa 977	2.007	3.230	US 59 in Cherokee	Iowa 3 near Cherokee	1962	2003	Former section of Iowa 3
Iowa 978	2.77	4.46	Iowa 44 in Whittemore	Iowa 358 in Whittemore	1962	1965	Former section of Iowa 358
Iowa 978	2.772	4.461	I-29 / US 34 near Glenwood	Iowa 385 near Pacific Junction	1974	2003	Former section of US 34; formerly Iowa 972
Iowa 979	19.80	31.87	Iowa City limits	Iowa 38	1961	2003	Former section of Iowa 1
Iowa 980	0.77	1.24	US 34 near Ottumwa	Ottumwa city limits	1967	1980	Former section of US 34; formerly US 34 Alternate
Iowa 981	0.44	0.71	Iowa 150 near Fayette	Fayette city limits	1967	1980	Former section of Iowa 150; formerly Iowa 991
Iowa 981	0.2	0.32	US 34 (later Iowa 340) in Batavia	US 34 (later Iowa 340) in Batavia	1995	1996	Former section of US 34
Iowa 982	0.30	0.48	Dubuque–Jones County Line	Iowa 136 near Cascade	1961	1965	Former section of Iowa 136
Iowa 982	27.787	44.719	Smithland city limits	Sioux City city limits	1967	2003	Former section of Iowa 141; formerly Iowa 994
Iowa 983	0.99	1.59	Iowa 989	US 34 / Iowa 213	1961	1964	Former section of Iowa 213
Iowa 983	0.81	1.30	US 34 west of Chariton	US 34 east of Chariton	1967	1980	Former section of US 34; formerly Iowa 995 and Iowa 996; had a gap through Chariton
Iowa 983	0.2	0.32	Market Street in Carlisle	Dead end in Carlisle	1998	1998	Former section of Iowa 5
Iowa 984	2.24	3.60	Bettendorf city limits	US 67 in Le Claire	1968	1982	Former section of Iowa 417
Iowa 985	1.00	1.61	US 63 north of Oskaloosa	US 63 north of Oskaloosa	1961	1965	Former section of US 63; decommissioned by 1965
Iowa 985	7.66	12.33	Sioux City limits	I-29 in Sioux City	1969	1973	Former section of Iowa 7
Iowa 985	1.927	3.101	US 52 near Bellevue State Park	US 52 near Bellevue	1980	2003	Park access road; former section of US 52
Iowa 986	4.86	7.82	Harrison–Monona county line	Iowa 301 in River Sioux	1968	1986	Former section of US 75
Iowa 987	4.45	7.16	US 63 / Iowa 412 in Waterloo	Hudson city limits	1961	1964	Former section of US 63
Iowa 988	0.16	0.26	Iowa 58 near Hudson	Hudson city limits	1961	1964	Former section of US 63
Iowa 988	2.312	3.721	I-29 / I-680 near Crescent	Iowa 183 in Crescent	1975	2003	
Iowa 989	17.76	28.58	Albia city limits	US 34 near Ottumwa	1961	1964	Former section of US 34
Iowa 990	0.27	0.43	Iowa 150 near Fayette	Fayette city limits	1961	1965	Former section of Iowa 150
Iowa 991	0.44	0.71	Fayette city limits	Iowa 150 near Fayette	1961	1967	Former section of Iowa 150; renumbered Iowa 981
Iowa 992	8.81	14.18	Wesley city limits	Britt city limits	1961	1965	Former section of US 18
Iowa 993	3.52	5.66	US 18 near Wesley	Wesley city limits	1961	1965	Former section of US 18
Iowa 994	27.787	44.719	Smithland city limits	Sioux City city limits	1961	1967	Former section of Iowa 141; renumbered Iowa 982
Iowa 995	0.56	0.90	US 34 west of Chariton	Chariton city limits	1961	1967	Former section of US 34; renumbered Iowa 983
Iowa 996	0.23	0.37	Chariton city limits	US 34 east of Chariton	1961	1976	Former section of US 34; became a second section of Iowa 983
Iowa 997	0.89	1.43	US 169 / Iowa 5 near Fort Dodge	Fort Dodge city limits	1961	1970	Former section of Iowa 5 (now Iowa 7)
Iowa 998	0.67	1.08	US 61 near Montrose	Dead end in Montrose	1961	1994	Former section of US 61; renumbered Iowa 924
Iowa 999	2.22	3.57	Spruce Street in College Springs	Iowa 333 near College Springs	1961	1980	Former section of Iowa 333
Former
