= Rhodes, Iowa =

- City
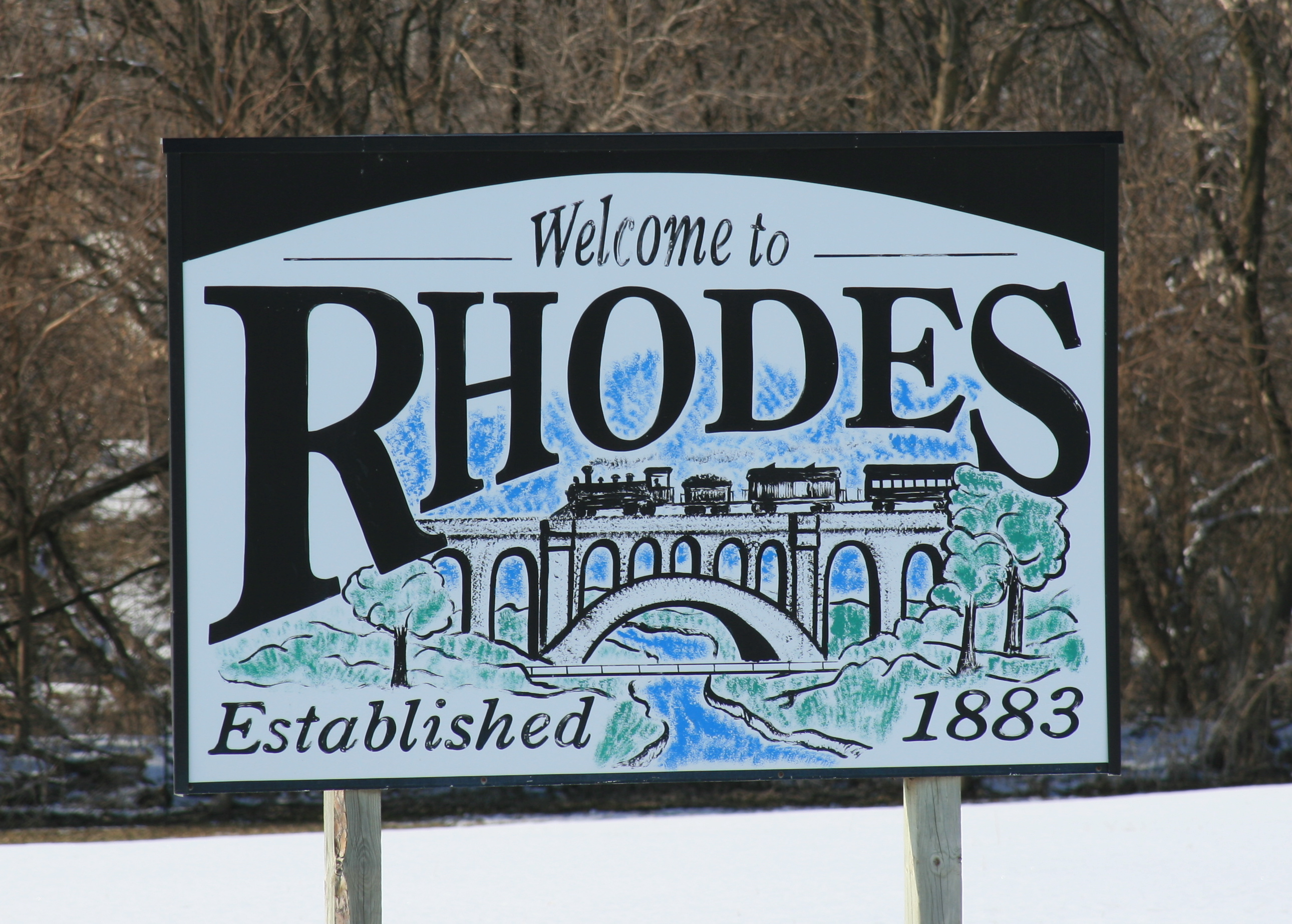
- Welcome Sign in Rhodes

- Location of Rhodes, Iowa
- Coordinates: 41°55′40″N 93°11′01″W
- Country: United States
- State: Iowa
- County: Marshall
- Established: 1882

Area
  - Total: 1.02 sq mi (2.63 km^{2})
  - Land: 1.02 sq mi (2.63 km^{2})
  - Water: 0 sq mi (0.00 km^{2})
- Elevation: 1,024 ft (312 m)

Population (2020)
  - Total: 271
  - Density: 267.2/sq mi (103.15/km^{2})
- Time zone: UTC-6 (Central (CST))
  - Summer (DST): UTC-5 (CDT)
- ZIP code: 50234
- Area code: 641
- FIPS code: 19-66540
- GNIS feature ID: 2396358

Rhodes (formerly known as Edenville) is a city in Marshall County, Iowa, United States. The population was 271 at the time of the 2020 census.

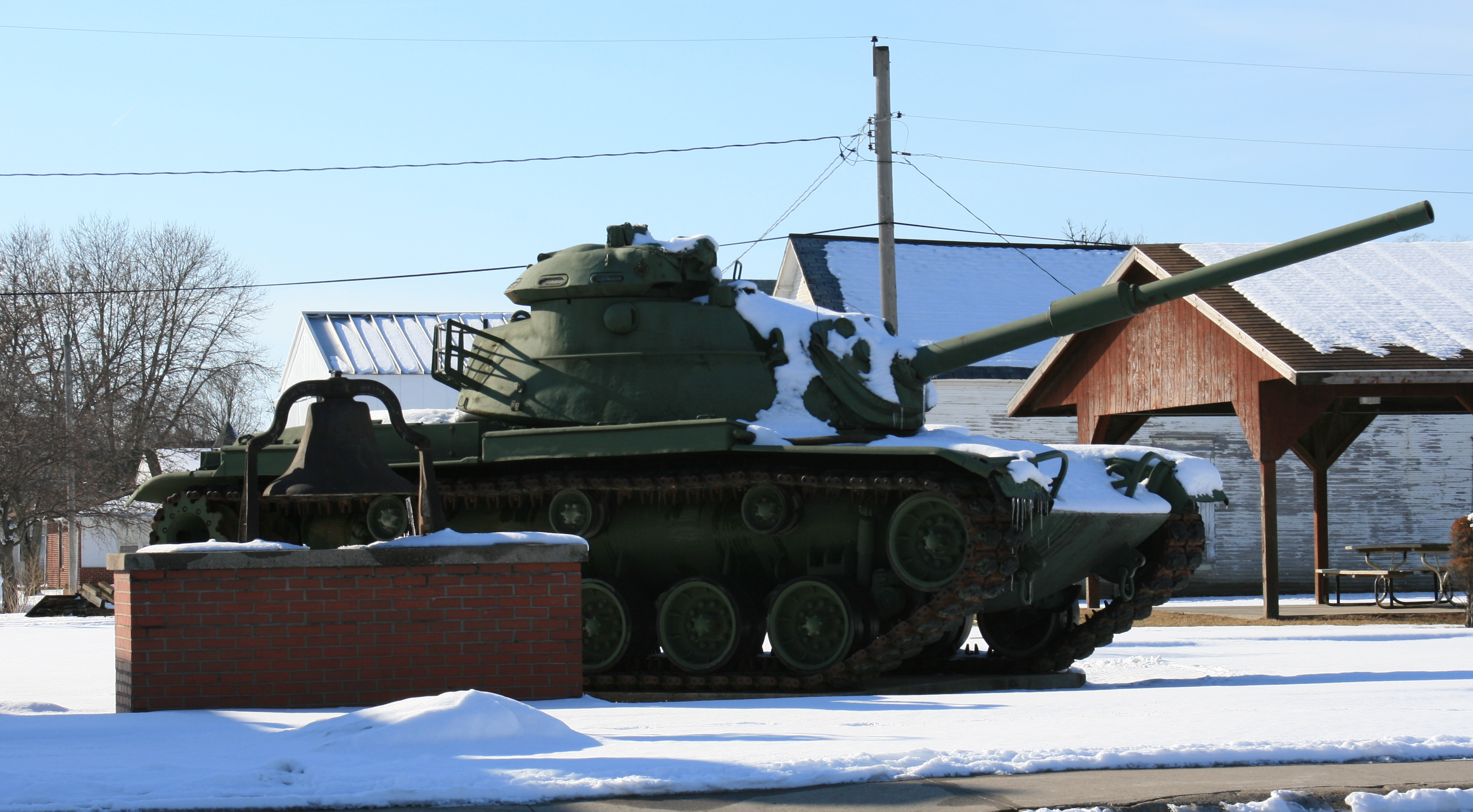
Tank located in the center of the city

== History ==
Rhodes was laid out in 1856, and it was incorporated in 1883. Postal service was originally established in the Marshall County town of Rhodes in 1860, at which time it was known as Edenville. The name of Rhodes was officially implemented on August 3, 1883, which was the name of the family that donated the land where the Chicago, Milwaukee & St. Paul (Milwaukee Road) Railroad Depot was originally located.

Part of Rhodes still remains the “Edenville Township”. The cemetery just outside of town is named Edenville cemetery.

== Geography ==
According to the United States Census Bureau, the city has a total area of 1.01 square miles (2.62 km^{2}), all land.

== Demographics ==
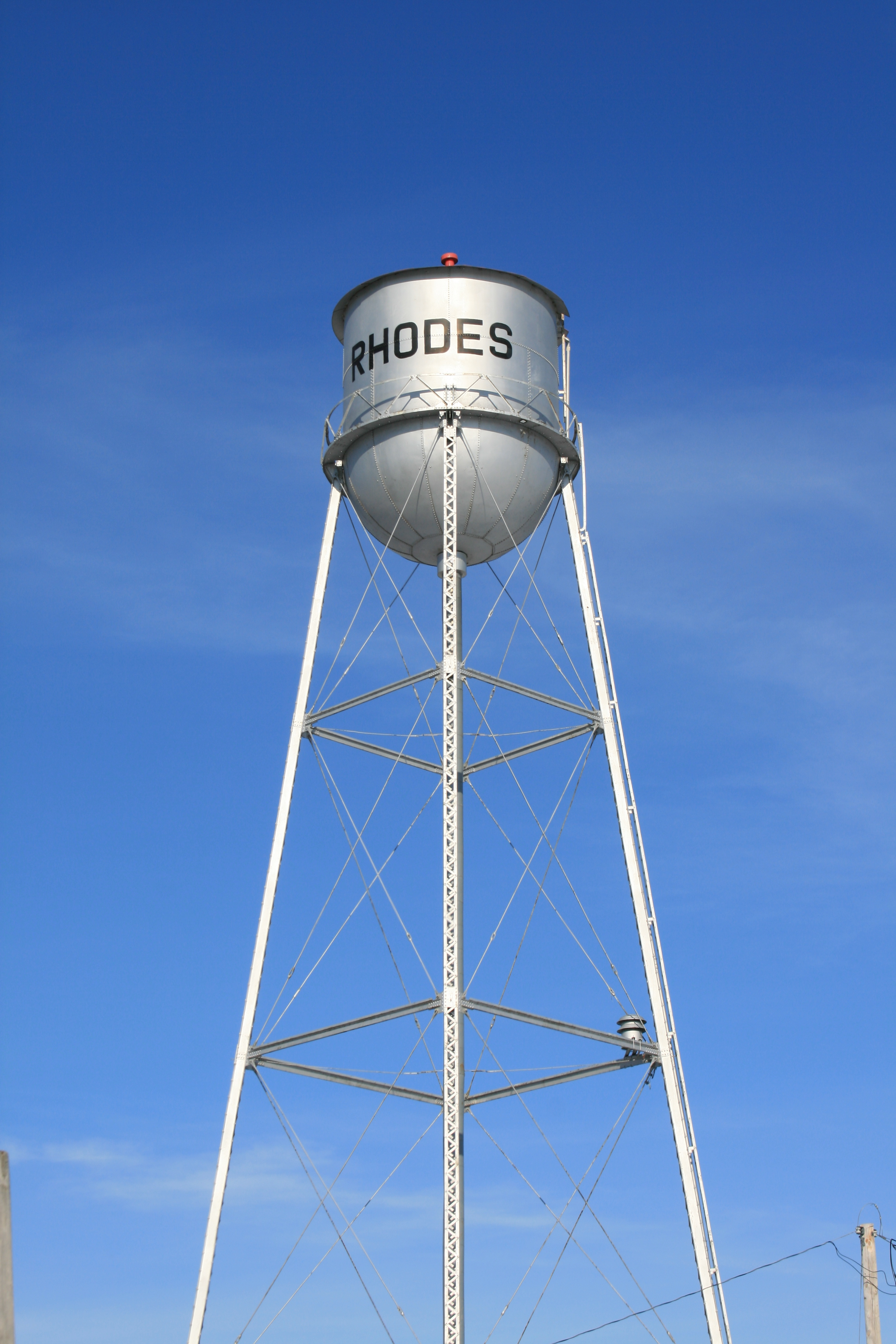
Water tower in Rhodes, Iowa

Historical populations
Year	Pop.	±%
1890	434	—
1900	476	+9.7%
1910	448	−5.9%
1920	439	−2.0%
1930	450	+2.5%
1940	379	−15.8%
1950	369	−2.6%
1960	358	−3.0%
1970	347	−3.1%
1980	367	+5.8%
1990	272	−25.9%
2000	294	+8.1%
2010	305	+3.7%
2020	271	−11.1%
Source:"U.S. Census website". United States Census Bureau. and Iowa Data Center; Source: U.S. Decennial Census

=== 2020 census ===
As of the census of 2020, there were 271 people, 107 households, and 70 families residing in the city. The population density was 267.1 inhabitants per square mile (103.1/km^{2}). There were 127 housing units at an average density of 125.2 per square mile (48.3/km^{2}). The racial makeup of the city was 91.5% White, 0.7% Black or African American, 0.0% Native American, 0.0% Asian, 0.0% Pacific Islander, 2.2% from other races and 5.5% from two or more races. Hispanic or Latino persons of any race comprised 7.7% of the population.

Of the 107 households, 26.2% of which had children under the age of 18 living with them, 55.1% were married couples living together, 3.7% were cohabitating couples, 18.7% had a female householder with no spouse or partner present and 22.4% had a male householder with no spouse or partner present. 34.6% of all households were non-families. 27.1% of all households were made up of individuals, 5.6% had someone living alone who was 65 years old or older.

The median age in the city was 45.7 years. 21.8% of the residents were under the age of 20; 3.0% were between the ages of 20 and 24; 24.0% were from 25 and 44; 32.5% were from 45 and 64; and 18.8% were 65 years of age or older. The gender makeup of the city was 52.0% male and 48.0% female.

=== 2010 census ===
As of the census of 2010, there were 305 people, 126 households, and 88 families living in the city. The population density was 302.0 inhabitants per square mile (116.6/km^{2}). There were 138 housing units at an average density of 136.6 per square mile (52.7/km^{2}). The racial makeup of the city was 96.7% White, 0.3% Native American, 0.3% Asian, 2.0% from other races, and 0.7% from two or more races. Hispanic or Latino of any race were 2.3% of the population.

There were 126 households, of which 31.7% had children under the age of 18 living with them, 46.8% were married couples living together, 15.1% had a female householder with no husband present, 7.9% had a male householder with no wife present, and 30.2% were non-families. 23.0% of all households were made up of individuals, and 8% had someone living alone who was 65 years of age or older. The average household size was 2.42 and the average family size was 2.82.

The median age in the city was 41.1 years. 23.6% of residents were under the age of 18; 10.8% were between the ages of 18 and 24; 23% were from 25 to 44; 28.1% were from 45 to 64; and 14.4% were 65 years of age or older. The gender makeup of the city was 50.8% male and 49.2% female.

=== 2000 census ===
As of the census of 2000, there were 294 people, 123 households, and 76 families living in the city. The population density was 289.4 inhabitants per square mile (111.7/km^{2}). There were 129 housing units at an average density of 127.0 per square mile (49.0/km^{2}). The racial makeup of the city was 98.64% White, 0.68% Asian, and 0.68% from two or more races.

There were 123 households, out of which 33.3% had children under the age of 18 living with them, 52.0% were married couples living together, 6.5% had a female householder with no husband present, and 37.4% were non-families. 30.1% of all households were made up of individuals, and 13.0% had someone living alone who was 65 years of age or older. The average household size was 2.39 and the average family size was 2.99.

In the city, the population was spread out, with 27.6% under the age of 18, 7.1% from 18 to 24, 25.5% from 25 to 44, 26.5% from 45 to 64, and 13.3% who were 65 years of age or older. The median age was 36 years. For every 100 females, there were 105.6 males. For every 100 females age 18 and over, there were 95.4 males.

The median income for a household in the city was $33,750, and the median income for a family was $41,786. Males had a median income of $34,375 versus $22,500 for females. The per capita income for the city was $16,376. About 8.3% of families and 11.6% of the population were below the poverty line, including 25.0% of those under the age of eighteen and 4.9% of those 65 or over.
