= Iowa Highway 12 =

State highway in Iowa, United States

Iowa Highway 12
- Iowa 12 highlighted in red

Route information
- Maintained by Iowa DOT
- Length: 46.212 mi (74.371 km)
- Existed: 1920–present
- Tourist routes: Loess Hills Scenic Byway

Major junctions
- South end: US 20 / US 75 at Sioux City
- I-29 / US 77 at Sioux City; Iowa 3 between Westfield and Akron
- North end: Iowa 10 in Hawarden

Location
- Country: United States
- State: Iowa
- Counties: Woodbury; Plymouth; Sioux

Highway system
- Iowa Primary Highway System; Interstate; US; State; Secondary; Scenic
← Iowa 10	→ Iowa 13

Iowa Highway 12 (Iowa 12) is a 46.212-mile-long (74.371 km) state highway that runs from north to south in northwestern Iowa. The highway begins in eastern Sioux City at U.S. Highway 20 (US 20) and US 75. For the first seven and a half miles (12.1 km) of the route, Iowa 12 is an unsigned highway. The first five miles (8.0 km) are signed only as U.S. Highway 20 Business; the other two and a half miles (4.0 km) are overlapped by Interstate 29 (I-29). From here, the highway lies just east of the Big Sioux River, which separates Iowa from South Dakota. The northern end of Iowa 12 is in Hawarden at an intersection with Iowa 10.

== Route description ==
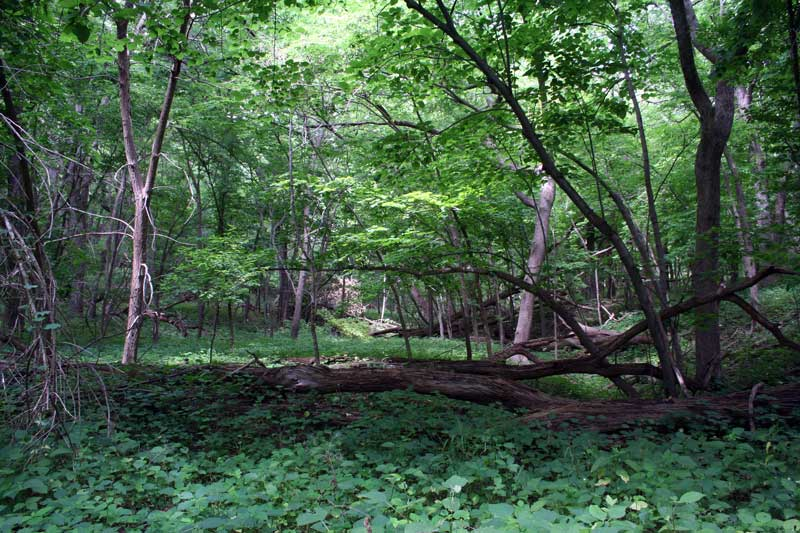
Stone State Park is along Iowa 12

Iowa Highway 12 begins at U.S. 20 and U.S. 75 signed as Business US 20. It continues west through Sioux City and becomes concurrent with Interstate 29 going west to Riverside Boulevard, where signage begins. It follows Riverside Boulevard while it passes through the Riverside neighborhood in Sioux City. It passes past Stone State Park in northwestern Sioux City and continues northwest towards Westfield. It turns northeast to enter Westfield, then intersects Iowa Highway 3. Iowa 12 and Iowa 3 overlap and go northeast to Akron, where Iowa 3 turns east. Iowa 12 continues northeast through Chatsworth and ends at Iowa 10 in Hawarden.

== History ==
Iowa Highway 12 was designated as a state highway in 1920. It originally went between Hamburg and Akron. It was shortened to Missouri Valley in 1924, and Sioux City in 1926. In 1931, it was extended north to Hawarden. In 1958, it was shortened to its intersection with I-29, but then in 1979, was extended east along I-29 and the newly formed Business Route 20 to end at the new U.S. 20 bypass in eastern Sioux City. In 2000, signage for this extension was removed and signage for Iowa 12 ended at I-29, though officially, Iowa 12 continues east through Sioux City.

== Major intersections ==
County	Location	mi	km	Exit	Destinations	Notes
Woodbury	Concord–Woodbury township line	0.000– 0.232	0.000– 0.373		US 20 Bus. begins / US 20 / US 75 – South Sioux City	Southern end of US 20 Business overlap; US 75 south exit 93, US 20 east exit 4B
Woodbury	Sioux City	3.085	4.965		Fairmount Street	Former US 75
Woodbury	Sioux City	3.380	5.440	–	US 75 Bus. (Lewis Boulevard)	Interchange
Woodbury	Sioux City	4.376	7.042	147A	I-29 south	Southern end of I-29 overlap; exit numbers follow I-29; signed exit 147 southbound
Woodbury	Sioux City	5.702	9.176	148	US 77 south (US 20 Business west) / Wesley Parkway north – South Sioux City, Nebraska	Southern end of US 20 Business overlap; southbound access via exit 149
Woodbury	Sioux City	5.415	8.715	149	To US 77 south (US 20 Business west) / Hamilton Boulevard – Riverfront Wesley Parkway north – South Sioux City	Northbound signed as Hamilton Boulevard only
Woodbury	Sioux City	7.920	12.746	151	I-29 north – Sioux Falls	Northern end of I-29 overlap; IowaDOT signs this as southern end of Iowa 12
Woodbury	Sioux City	8.155	13.124		War Eagle Drive	Former US 77
Woodbury	Sioux City	9.909	15.947		Military Road	Former US 77
Plymouth	Westfield Township	28.698	46.185		Iowa 3 west – Vermillion, S.D.	Southern end of Iowa 3 overlap
Plymouth	Akron	33.433	53.805		Iowa 3 east (South Street) / Loess Hills Scenic Byway ends – Le Mars	Northern end of Iowa 3 overlap
Plymouth	Akron	34.199	55.038		Big Sioux River Road to I-29 / SD 48 – Alcester	
Sioux	Hawarden	46.551	74.917		Iowa 10 – Beresford, S.D., Orange City	Road continues as Iowa 10 west (Avenue E north)
1.000 mi = 1.609 km; 1.000 km = 0.621 mi: Concurrency terminus
