= Lewis and Clark State Park (Iowa) =

State park in Iowa, United States

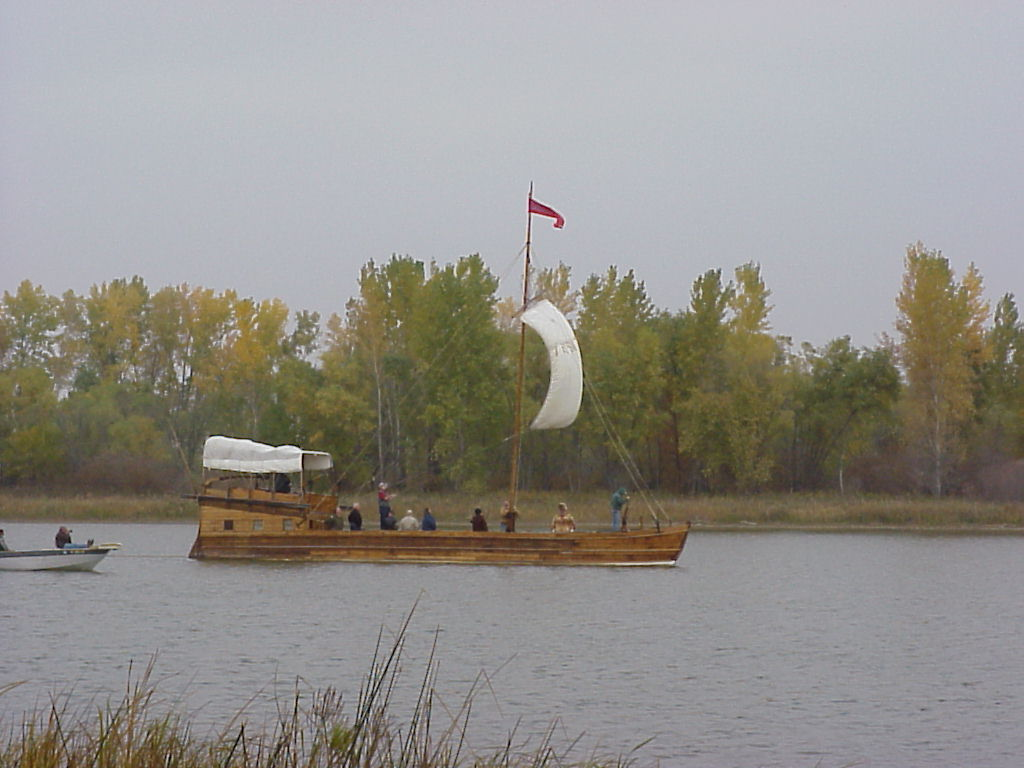

- Location within Iowa Location within the United States
- Location: Monona County, Iowa, United States
- Coordinates: 42°2′44.71″N 96°10′10.504″W
- Area: 176 acres (71 ha)
- Elevation: 1,047 ft (319 m)
- Administrator: Iowa Department of Natural Resources
- Named for: Meriwether Lewis and William Clark
- Website: Official website

Lewis and Clark State Park is a state park in the US state of Iowa consisting of 176 acres (71 ha) located in Monona County. The park features camping, picnicking, boating, swimming, and fishing on 250-acre (100 ha) Blue Lake. It has 95 electric camp sites and has a full size replica of a keelboat of the type used by the Lewis and Clark Expedition when they stopped in this area in 1804 on their way up the Missouri River.
