= U.S. Route 77 in Iowa =

Highway in Iowa, United States

U.S. Highway 77
- Wesley Parkway
- US 77 highlighted in red

Route information
- Maintained by Iowa DOT
- Length: 0.314 mi (505 m)
- Existed: 1929–present
- History: Extended into South Dakota: 1929–mid-1980s

Major junctions
- South end: US 77 at the Missouri River at Sioux City
- I-29 in Sioux City
- North end: Wesley Parkway north in Sioux City

Location
- Country: United States
- State: Iowa
- Counties: Woodbury

Highway system
- United States Numbered Highway System; List; Special; Divided; Iowa Primary Highway System; Interstate; US; State; Secondary; Scenic
← Iowa 76	→ Iowa 78

U.S. Highway 77 (US 77) is the shortest U.S. Highway in the state of Iowa. It crosses into Iowa over the Missouri River from South Sioux City, Nebraska, at Sioux City and runs approximately three-tenths mile (500 m) to an interchange with Interstate 29 where the road continues north as Wesley Parkway. Like all other state highways in Iowa, the route is maintained by the Iowa Department of Transportation.

US 77 has never been a long route in Iowa. When it was extended into the state in 1929, it only traveled 6 miles (9.7 km) in Sioux City before crossing the Big Sioux River into South Dakota. After I-29 was built in Sioux City during the late 1950s, US 77 was moved onto the new Interstate Highway. At both historic ends of the highway in Iowa, bridge failures have caused US 77 to be detoured around Sioux City. In the mid-1980s, the national end of the highway was moved to the interchange with I-29.

== Route description ==
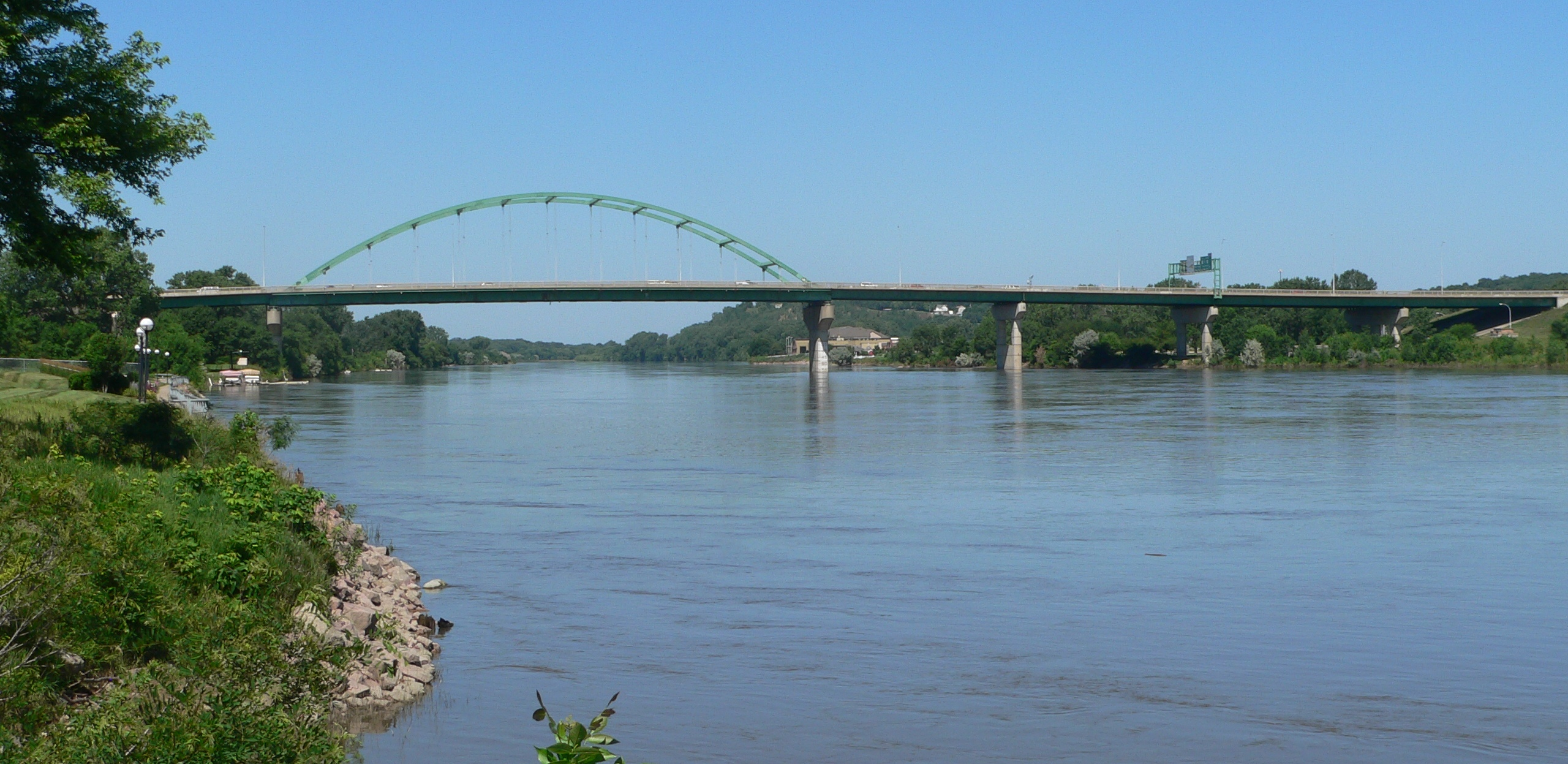
US 77 crossing the Missouri River into Iowa

US 77 in Iowa begins on the Siouxland Veterans Memorial Bridge over the Missouri River. It heads north along Wesley Parkway where it comes to an interchange with Interstate 29 (I-29), U.S. Highway 20 Business (US 20 Business), and Iowa Highway 12 (Iowa 12). On either side of the interchange Iowa 12 is an unsigned highway; east of the interchange, the route is signed as US 20 Business, while on the west side it is a duplicate route with I-29. US 20 Business exits Wesley Parkway and briefly overlaps I-29. US 77 ends at the center of the interchange. The entire route is 0.314 miles (1,660 ft; 505 m) long.

US 77 is the shortest U.S. Highway in the state and the second shortest state highway overall. I-129, which is located 4 miles (6.4 km) southeast of US 77, is the shortest state highway at 0.286 miles (0.460 km) in length. In each instance, the highway crosses the Missouri River from Nebraska and ends at I-29.

== History ==
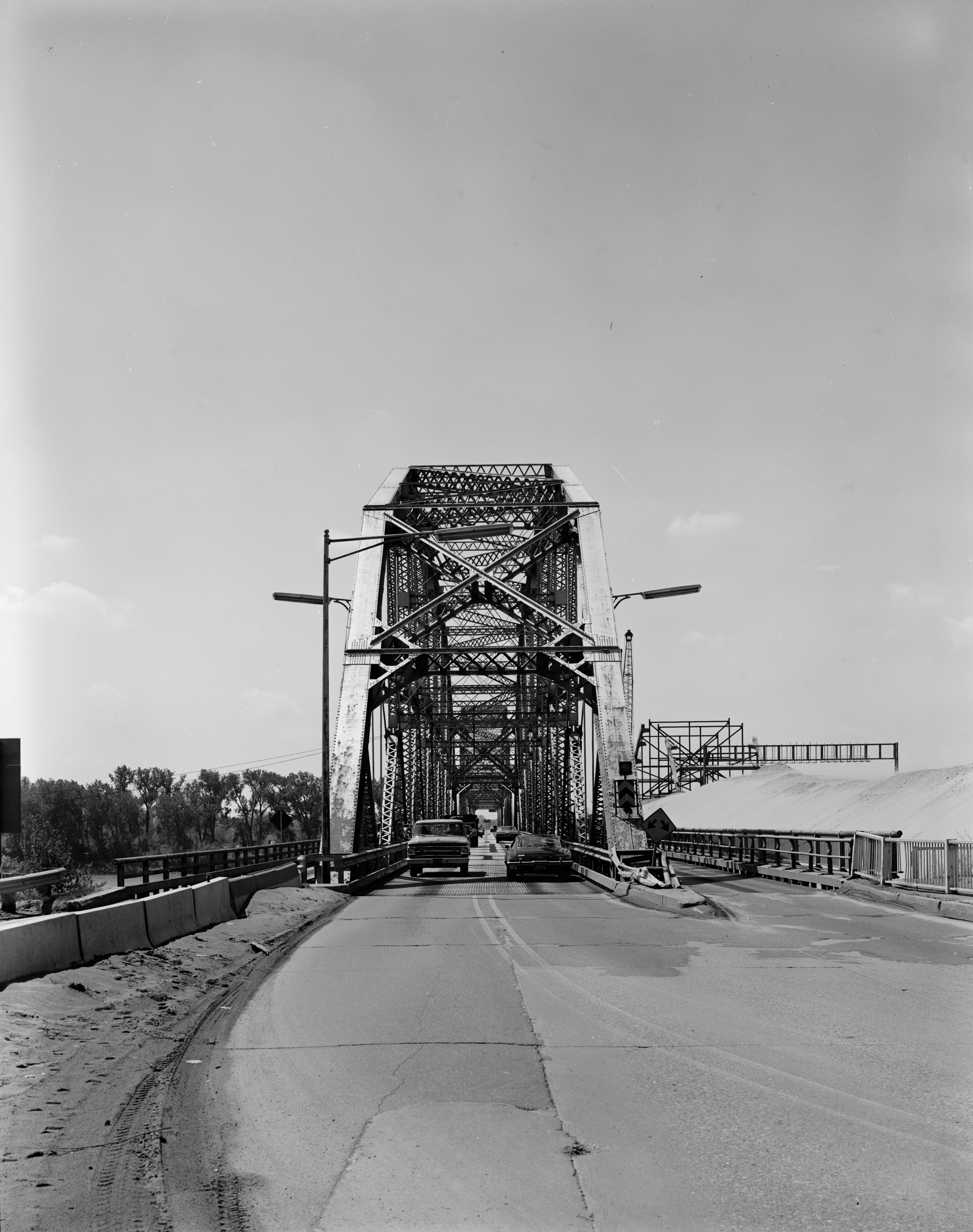
US 20 and US 77 originally crossed the Missouri River on the Combination Bridge

US 77 has never been a long route in Iowa. It was extended into Iowa in 1929, overlapping US 20 across the Combination Bridge and onto Perry Street. US 20 turned east onto 5th Street and US 77 turned west one block north onto Riverside Avenue, now known as 4th Street. It followed Riverside west and onto a curvy section near the confluence of the Big Sioux and Missouri rivers. The route curved back to the north along the banks of the Big Sioux River. It turned west onto Military Road and crossed the river into South Dakota shortly thereafter. The route at its longest extent was 6 miles (9.7 km). The portion of the route west of US 20 replaced a section of Primary Road No. 141, which followed a route parallel to US 77's.

In 1951, Gordon Drive, which carried US 20 east of the Combination Bridge, was extended westward along the banks of the Missouri River. It connected to Riverside Avenue near the river confluence. US 77 was moved onto the new road which removed the curvy section of Riverside. In the late 1950s when construction of I-29 began, its route was planned along the banks of the Missouri River generally following the path of US 275, US 75, and US 77. The first section of I-29, from a point along Gordon Drive east of the Combination Bridge to the Big Sioux River opened around October 1, 1958. US 77 was moved onto the new interstate from the Combination Bridge to the Riverside Boulevard interchange.

After sections of I-29 in South Dakota opened up, allowing traffic to utilize bridges crossing the Big Sioux that were built in 1958, US 77 was moved onto the interstate completely. However, the arrangement did not last long. On April 2, 1962, surging flood waters from the Big Sioux brought down the northbound bridge over the river. An investigation of the collapse found the surging waters scoured the dirt and rocks away from around the bridge piers, which caused them to fail. Both directions of traffic were routed along US 77's old alignment while the bridges were repaired.

US 77 faced more bridge problems at its other end. In the late-1970s and early-1980s, a steel, tied arch bridge was built to replace the Combination Bridge, which opened in 1895. The Siouxland Veterans Memorial Bridge opened to traffic in January 1981 and was dedicated months later on July 22. This too, would not last long. During routine bridge washing on May 6, 1982, an Iowa DOT worker discovered a 30-inch-long (76 cm) crack across a box girder. The crack was approximately 1/32 inch (0.79 mm) wide and was rusted, which told the workers it had been there for some time. The bridge was immediately closed down for repairs. Traffic was rerouted south to cross the Missouri at the I-129 bridge. The bridge would not be fully opened again until May 1983.

Within a couple years, US 77 would be truncated to the I-29 interchange. The completion of Interstate 29 in South Dakota, which generally followed US 77 northward, meant the end of the U.S. Highway's importance. Maps published by the Iowa DOT in 1983 and traffic logs from 1984 show and list US 77 extending into South Dakota. Highway maps and traffic logs from 1986 show US 77 ending at I-29, meaning the route was shortened at some time in those two years.

== Major intersections ==
County	Location	mi	km	Destinations	Notes
Missouri River		0.000	0.000	US 77 south / US 20 Bus. west	Continuation into South Sioux City, Nebraska
Missouri River		0.000	0.000	Siouxland Veterans Memorial Bridge; Iowa–Nebraska line	
Woodbury	Sioux City	0.262– 0.314	0.422– 0.505	I-29 / US 20 Bus. east / Iowa 12 – Sioux Falls, Council Bluffs	National northern terminus of US 77; northern end of US 20 Business overlap; I-29 exit 148 (northbound) and exit 149 (southbound)
Woodbury	Sioux City	0.262– 0.314	0.422– 0.505	Wesley Parkway north – Sioux City	Continuation beyond I-29
1.000 mi = 1.609 km; 1.000 km = 0.621 mi: Concurrency terminus

U.S. Route 77
Previous state: Nebraska	Iowa	Next state: Terminus
