= Swanson (surname) =

Swanson is a surname. It is often the anglicized form of the Swedish surname Svensson. Notable people with this surname include the following:

== Sportspeople ==
- A. L. Swanson (1905–1987), American football coach
- Becca Swanson (born 1973), American bodybuilder
- Ben Swanson (born 1997), American soccer player
- Bill Swanson (baseball) (1888–1954), baseball player
- Bob Swanson (driver) (1912–1940), Indianapolis 500 driver
- Brian Swanson (born 1976), ice hockey player
- Clarence Swanson (1898–1970), American football player
- Cub Swanson (born 1983), American mixed martial artist
- Danny Swanson (born 1986), Scottish footballer
- Dansby Swanson (born 1994), American baseball player; husband of Mallory
- Duane Swanson (1913–2000), American basketball player
- Erik Swanson (born 1993), American baseball player
- Evar Swanson (1902–1973), American baseball and football player
- James Swanson (racing driver) (born 1980), American stock car racing driver
- Mallory Swanson (born 1998), American soccer player
- Peter Swanson (rugby) (1946–2003), South African rugby player
- Riley Swanson (born 1984), American football player
- Stan Swanson (1944–2017), American baseball player
- Tanner Swanson, American baseball coach
- Taylor Swanson, American Paralympic athlete
- Zak Swanson (born 2000), English footballer

== Other occupations ==
- Albert and Ruth Swanson, plaintiffs of Swanson v. Roman Catholic Bishop
- Arthur Swanson (1926–2010), American businessman and politician
- Brandon Swanson (born 1989), American student who disappeared in 2008
- Bryan Swanson (born 1980), British sports television reporter
- Carl A. Swanson (1879–1949), Swedish-American food industry businessman and founder of Swanson
- Charles Edward Swanson (1879–1970), American politician
- Chris Swanson, American politician
- Claude A. Swanson (1862–1939), American lawyer and politician
- David Swanson, American journalist and Democratic activist
- Don R. Swanson (1924–2012), American information scientist
- Donald Swanson (1848–1924), London police officer, charged with investigating the Whitechapel murders
- E. Burton Swanson (born 1939), American computer scientist
- Eric Swanson, American attorney
- Frank J. Swanson (1865–1941), American politician
- G. A. Swanson (1939–2009), American organizational theorist
- Gloria Swanson (1899–1983), American actress
- Hilding Alfred Swanson (1885–1964), American lawyer and politician
- Howard Swanson (1907–1978), American composer
- Irena Swanson, Yugoslav-born American mathematician
- Jack Swanson (born 1992), American operatic tenor
- Jackie Swanson (born 1963), American actress
- James C. Swanson (1934–2024), American educator and politician
- James L. Swanson (1959–2025), American author and historian
- Jandi Swanson, American child actress
- Jean Swanson, Canadian anti-poverty activist
- Jeffrey Swanson, American psychiatrist
- John Swanson (disambiguation), several people
- John Swanson (Medal of Honor recipient), American Civil War sailor and Medal of Honor recipient
- John A. Swanson, American engineer
- John August Swanson (1938–2021), American artist
- Jon E. Swanson (1942–1971), US Army helicopter pilot and Medal of Honor recipient
- Kristy Swanson (born 1969), American actress
- Lori Swanson, attorney general of Minnesota
- Marc Swanson, American artist
- Meryl Swanson (born 1970), Australian politician
- Paul Swanson, American bridge player
- Richard A. Swanson (born 1942), American organizational theorist
- Richard Swanson, American founder of SunPower
- Robert Swanson (inventor) (1905–1994), Canadian inventor and poet
- Robert A. Swanson (1947–1999), Genentech founder
- Sandré Swanson (born 1948), California politician
- Shana Swanson (born 1967), American attorney
- Stephan Swanson (born 1967), South African shark researcher
- Steve Swanson (musician), guitarist
- Steven Swanson (born 1960), American astronaut
- Timothy Swanson, British academic
- Valoree Swanson (born 1957), American politician
- Wendy Sue Swanson, American pediatrician
- William Swanson (disambiguation), several people

== Fictional ==
- Joe Swanson, Family Guy character
- Ron Swanson, Parks and Recreation character
- Jimmy Valmer, South Park character whose original surname was Swanson
- Orville Swanson, Red Dead Redemption 2 character

== See also ==
- Svensson (surname)
- Swanston (surname)
- Swanton (surname)
