= John Swanson =

John Swanson may refer to:

- John Swanson (Medal of Honor) (1842–1923), American Civil War sailor and Medal of Honor recipient
- John Swanson (cricketer) (born 1940), Australian cricketer
- John Swanson (bridge), American bridge player and writer
- John August Swanson (born 1938), American visual artist
- John A. Swanson, American engineer, entrepreneur, and philanthropist
- Jon E. Swanson (1942–1971), United States Army officer and Medal of Honor recipient
- Johnny Swanson, candidate in the United States Senate election in Alabama, 2008
- Johnny Swanson, novel by Eleanor Updale
