= Lawrence Haworth =

American-born Canadian philosopher (1926–2024)

Lawrence Lindley Haworth FRSC (December 14, 1926 – April 28, 2024) was an American-born Canadian philosopher.

Haworth was the author of several books of political philosophy, a Fellow of the Royal Society of Canada, and distinguished professor emeritus at the University of Waterloo in Waterloo, Ontario.

== Early life and career ==
Haworth was born in Chicago, Illinois on December 14, 1926, and grew up in the south suburbs of Hazel Crest and Homewood. He began his undergraduate studies in 1943 at Thornton Junior College, Harvey, Illinois, and continued for a term at Ripon College, Ripon, Wisconsin. In early 1945 he was drafted into the United States Army. After the war he was sent to Japan where he was assigned to the 32nd Infantry Division as part of the military occupation. Subsequently, he was transferred to I Corp, based in Kyoto. While there he began the study of philosophy under the tutelage of Professor Erwin Jahn, a German Professor of Philosophy at Kyoto University. In the pre-first world war years Jahn had been an assistant to the German psychologist Wilhelm Wundt, sometimes referred to as the founder of experimental psychology. Jahn's tutelage consolidated Haworth's commitment to the study of philosophy. After the war, he attended Rollins College, Winter Park, Florida, where in 1949 he received the BA "With Highest Distinction". In 1949, Haworth began PhD studies in philosophy at the University of Illinois under the supervision of Max Fisch. In 1952 he was awarded a PhD in philosophy and at the same time was elected to Phi Beta Kappa.

Haworth's first academic appointment was at the University of Alabama (1952–54), followed by Purdue University (1954–65). In 1965 he accepted a professorship at the University of Waterloo in Waterloo, Ontario, and continued there until his retirement in 1995. Along with teaching, Haworth served at various times as Associate Dean of Graduate Studies, Associate Dean of Computing, and Associate Dean for Research, all in the Faculty of Arts, and as Chair of the Department of Philosophy. He was the founding Director of the University of Waterloo Centre for Society, Technology and Values and was a Consultant to the Brookings Institution, Washington, D.C., from 1965 to 1970.

Haworth was Distinguished Professor Emeritus at the University of Waterloo, and a Fellow of the Royal Society of Canada.

== Personal life and death ==
Haworth was married first to Helen Ellis (died 2015), and then to Alison Pedlar, Distinguished Professor Emerita at the University of Waterloo. He had two children, Alan Gardener (née Larry Haworth), who predeceased him in 2021, and Ruth Ellis Haworth. Lawrence Haworth died on April 28, 2024, at the age of 97.

== Publications ==
=== Books ===
- A Textured Life: Empowerment and Adults with Intellectual Disabilities. Waterloo, Ontario: Wilfrid Laurier University Press, 1999. With A. Pedlar, et al.
- Value Assumptions in Risk Assessment: The Alachlor Controversy. Waterloo, Ontario: Wilfrid Laurier University Press, 1991. With C. Brunk and B. Lee.
- Autonomy: An Essay in Philosophical Psychology and Ethics. New Haven, Conn.: Yale University Press, 1986.
- Decadence and Objectivity. Toronto: University of Toronto Press, 1977. Paperback Edition, 1979.
- The Good City. Bloomington, Ind.: Indiana University Press, 1963. Paperback edition, 1966. Overseas edition, Fawcett Publications, 1967. English edition, 1968.

=== Edited books, reports ===
- Social Support Outcomes and Empowerment. In the Proceedings of the 10th World Congress of the International Association for the Scientific Study of Intellectual Disabilities, Helsinki, Finland. 1996. With A. Pedlar, P. Hutchison, and P. Dunn.
- Empowerment-in-community. Proceedings of 11th World Congress of the IASSID. In Journal of Intellectual Disability Research, 44, 425. 2000. With A. Pedlar, P. Hutchison, and P. Dunn.
- Managing the Competing Values Respecting Animals, Humans and the Environment in a Healthy Agroecosystem. Working paper, Agroecosystem Health Project. University of Guelph, 1994.
- Preliminary review of the U.S. EPA standards for the use and disposal of sewage sludge final rule document. Prepared for Agriculture Canada. University of Waterloo: Institute for Risk Research, 1993. With others, (pp. 40)
- Value Assumptions in Risk Assessment. University of Waterloo: Institute for Risk Assessment, 1991. With C. Brunk and B. Lee. (pp. 30)
- The Good City: 1984 and Beyond, edited by L. Haworth. Special edition of Environments 16(2):1984.
- "The Open University", (1969) CMHC Report.
- "Toward a Community Affairs Program", (1969) CMHC Report.

=== Chapters in books ===
- "Community", in C. Rojek, S. Shaw, & T. Veal (Eds.), The Handbook of Leisure Studies. London: Palgrave and Macmillan. 2006. With A. Pedlar.
- "Focal Things and Focal Practices", in Technology and the Good Life? edited by E. Higgs, A. Light, and D. Strong. Chicago: University of Chicago Press, 2000. pp. 55–69.
- "Empowerment-in-Community", in Journal of Intellectual Disability Research, 44, 425. Proceedings of the 11th Congress of the JASSID. 2000. With A. Pedlar and P. Hutchison.
- "Social Support Outcomes and Empowerment", in Proceedings of the 10th World Congress of the International Association for the Scientific Study of Intellectual Disabilities, Helsinki, Finland. 1996. With A. Pedlar, P. Hutchison, and P. Dunn.
- "Managing the Competing Values Respecting Animals, Humans and the Environment in the Healthy Agroecosystem", in L 'Etre Humain, L 'Animal et L 'Environnement: Dimensions Ethiques et Juridiques. Montreal: Les Editions Themis, 1996. pp. 543–550.
- "The Use and Abuse of Science", in Agricultural Ethics, edited by Mora Campbell. Truro, N.S. 1994.
- "Can Risk Assessment be Objective?", in Managing Environmental Risks. With C. Brunk and B. Lee. 1994.
- "Psychological Freedom", in Rechtstheorie, Beiheft 12, edited by P. Sack, C. Wellman, and M.Yasaki, Duncker & Humblot (Berlin), 1991, pp. 389–395.
- "Autonomy, Responsibility and Alcoholism", in Health Futures: Alcohol and Drugs, edited by D. McCready. Waterloo, Ontario: Interdisciplinary Research Committee, 1991, pp. 27–41.
- "Autonomy and Utility", in The Inner Citadel, edited by John Christman. New York: Oxford University Press, 1989, pp. 155–169.
- "Afterword", in The Professional Practice of Environmental Management. R. Dorney (edited by L. Dorney). New York: Springer-Verlag, 1989.
- "Leisure, Work and Profession", in Work in Canada, edited by John F. Peters. Waterloo, Ontario: Interdisciplinary Research Committee, 1986, pp. 25–42.
- "The Deweyan View of Experience", in Possibility of the Aesthetic Experience, edited by M. Mitias. Dordrecht, Netherlands: Martinus Nijhoff, 1986, pp. 79–89.
- "The Good City", in Urban Problems, edited by Krueger and Bryfogle. Toronto: Holt, Rinehart and Winston, revised edition, 1975, pp. 34–37.
- "Utility and Rights", in Concepts in Social and Political Philosophy, edited by R. E. Flathmann. New York: Macmillan, 1973, pp. 468–484. Reprinted from Studies in Moral Philosophy. Oxford: Blackwell's, 1968.
- "Goals for Regional Planning", in The Concept of a Regional Development Plan. Waterloo, Ontario: Planning and Resources Institute, 1970.
- "The Justification of Morality", in Studies in Philosophy and in the History of Science. Lawrence, Kansas: Coronado, 1970, pp. 18–29.
- "Utility and Rights", in Studies in Moral Philosophy. Oxford: Blackwell's, 1968.
- "Deprivation and the Good City", in Power, Poverty and Urban Policy, edited by Bloomberg and Schmandt. Beverly Hills, Calif.: Sage Publications, 1968, pp. 27–47.
- "The Good City", in Social Ethics, edited by G. Winter. New York: Harper and Row, 1968, pp. 165¬1965.

=== Articles in refereed journals ===
- "A Dual Perspective Theory of Agroecosystem Health: System Goals and System Functions." With C. Brunk, D. Jennex, and S. Arai. Journal of Agricultural and Environmental Ethics, 10:2 (1997/98): 127–52.
- Critical Notice: "Freedom: A Coherence Theory" by Christine Swanton, Canadian Journal of Philosophy, 1994: 337–354.
- "The Use and Abuse of Science in Risk Assessment", Medical Physics 13:44 (1993):2-10.
- "Dworkin on Autonomy", Ethics 102 (1991): 129–139.
- "Is a Scientific Assessment of Risk Possible?", Dialogue 30 (1991):235-247. With C. Brunk and B. Lee.
- "Bay, Narveson, and Autonomy", Interchange 19 (1988):69-75.
- "Liberal Neutrality", Dialogue, (1988):711-719.
- "Orwell, The Planning Profession, and Autonomy", Environments 16 (1984): 10–15.
- "Autonomy and Utility", Ethics 95 (1984):5-19.
- "Leisure, Work, and Profession", Leisure Studies 3 (1984):319-334.
- "Work in Post-Consumer Society", Past & Present, (1984):2-3.
- "Haworth on Rights", Past & Present, (December, 1980).
- "Dworkin, Rights and Persons", Canadian Journal of Philosophy, (1979):413-423.
- "Rights, Wrongs, and Animals", Ethics, (1978):95-105.
- "Reply to Guild", Eidos, (1978):113-115.
- "Human Needs in Settlements", Plan Canada, (1975):8-13.
- "The Language of Justice", Southern Journal of Philosophy.
- "Planners, Philosophers and the Good City", Plan Canada 10 (1970):72-82.
- "Dewey's Philosophy of the Corporation", Educational Theory, (Fall, 1970):345-363. Reprinted from Ethics,(1962):120-131.
- "The Good City", Part I, American Institute of Planners, Ohio Valley Chapter Newsletter, (June, 1965):31-40.
- "The Good City", Part II, American Institute of Planners, Ohio Valley Chapter Newsletter, (September, 1965): 16–33.
- "The Standard View of the State: A Critique", Ethics, (1963):266-278.
- "Dewey's Philosophy of the Corporation", Ethics, (1962):266-278.
- "The Experimental Society", Ethics, (1960):27-40.
- "Toward a New Liberalism", Harvard Business Review, (1960):29-34.
- "Do Organizations Act?", Ethics, (1959):59-63.
- "The Free Society", Ethics, (1957):119-126.
- "An Institutional Theory of the City and Planning", American Institute of Planners Journal, (Winter, 1957–58).
- "Common Sense Morality," Ethics, (1955):250-260.
- "Concerning Value Science," Philosophy of Science, (1954):54-61. With J. S. Minas.
