= Westfield, Iowa =

- City
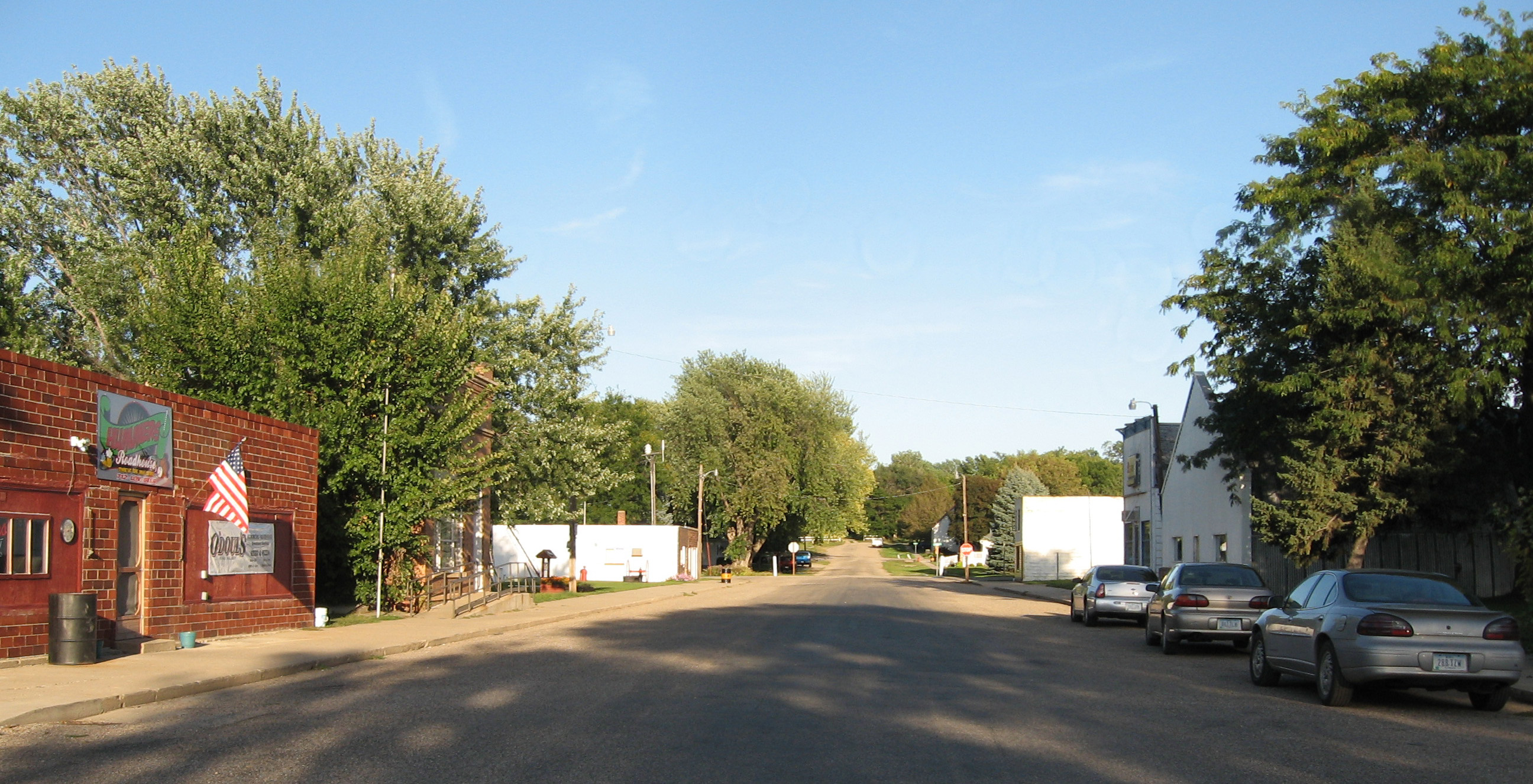
- Downtown Westfield, Iowa

- Location of Westfield, Iowa
- Coordinates: 42°45′22″N 96°36′20″W
- Country: USA
- State: Iowa
- County: Plymouth

Area
  - Total: 0.13 sq mi (0.34 km^{2})
  - Land: 0.13 sq mi (0.34 km^{2})
  - Water: 0 sq mi (0.00 km^{2})
- Elevation: 1,135 ft (346 m)

Population (2020)
  - Total: 123
  - Density: 930/sq mi (358.9/km^{2})
- Time zone: UTC-6 (Central (CST))
  - Summer (DST): UTC-5 (CDT)
- ZIP code: 51062
- Area code: 712
- FIPS code: 19-84090
- GNIS feature ID: 2397279
- Website: www.westfieldiowa.com

Westfield is a city in Plymouth County, Iowa, United States. The population was 123 at the time of the 2020 census. It is the westernmost point in Iowa, this being due to a bend in the Big Sioux River. The nearby Broken Kettle wildlife refuge is one of the few places in Iowa where prairie rattlesnakes are commonly found.

== Geography ==
According to the United States Census Bureau, the city has a total area of 0.13 square miles (0.34 km^{2}), all land.

== Demographics ==
Historical populations
Year	Pop.	±%
1910	143	—
1920	203	+42.0%
1930	218	+7.4%
1940	197	−9.6%
1950	172	−12.7%
1960	187	+8.7%
1970	148	−20.9%
1980	199	+34.5%
1990	160	−19.6%
2000	189	+18.1%
2010	132	−30.2%
2020	123	−6.8%
Source:"U.S. Census website". United States Census Bureau. and Iowa Data Center; Source: U.S. Decennial Census

=== 2020 census ===
As of the census of 2020, there were 123 people, 54 households, and 35 families residing in the city. The population density was 929.5 inhabitants per square mile (358.9/km^{2}). There were 64 housing units at an average density of 483.7 per square mile (186.7/km^{2}). The racial makeup of the city was 70.7% White, 0.0% Black or African American, 4.9% Native American, 0.8% Asian, 0.0% Pacific Islander, 7.3% from other races and 16.3% from two or more races. Hispanic or Latino persons of any race comprised 22.8% of the population.

Of the 54 households, 27.8% of which had children under the age of 18 living with them, 40.7% were married couples living together, 11.1% were cohabitating couples, 24.1% had a female householder with no spouse or partner present and 24.1% had a male householder with no spouse or partner present. 35.2% of all households were non-families. 27.8% of all households were made up of individuals, 7.4% had someone living alone who was 65 years old or older.

The median age in the city was 48.2 years. 17.9% of the residents were under the age of 20; 3.3% were between the ages of 20 and 24; 26.0% were from 25 and 44; 35.0% were from 45 and 64; and 17.9% were 65 years of age or older. The gender makeup of the city was 52.8% male and 47.2% female.

=== 2010 census ===
As of the census of 2010, there were 132 people, 54 households, and 37 families living in the city. The population density was 1,015.4 inhabitants per square mile (392.0/km^{2}). There were 73 housing units at an average density of 561.5 per square mile (216.8/km^{2}). The racial makeup of the city was 87.1% White, 3.8% Native American, 3.0% from other races, and 6.1% from two or more races. Hispanic or Latino of any race were 5.3% of the population.

There were 54 households, of which 33.3% had children under the age of 18 living with them, 51.9% were married couples living together, 5.6% had a female householder with no husband present, 11.1% had a male householder with no wife present, and 31.5% were non-families. 29.6% of all households were made up of individuals, and 9.3% had someone living alone who was 65 years of age or older. The average household size was 2.44 and the average family size was 3.00.

The median age in the city was 39.5 years. 23.5% of residents were under the age of 18; 9.9% were between the ages of 18 and 24; 25% were from 25 to 44; 30.2% were from 45 to 64; and 11.4% were 65 years of age or older. The gender makeup of the city was 51.5% male and 48.5% female.

=== 2000 census ===
As of the census of 2000, there were 189 people, 74 households, and 54 families living in the city. The population density was 1,438.3 inhabitants per square mile (555.3/km^{2}). There were 85 housing units at an average density of 646.9 per square mile (249.8/km^{2}). The racial makeup of the city was 89.42% White, 3.70% Native American, 1.06% Asian, 0.53% from other races, and 5.29% from two or more races. Hispanic or Latino of any race were 2.12% of the population.

There were 74 households, out of which 33.8% had children under the age of 18 living with them, 54.1% were married couples living together, 14.9% had a female householder with no husband present, and 25.7% were non-families. 24.3% of all households were made up of individuals, and 9.5% had someone living alone who was 65 years of age or older. The average household size was 2.55 and the average family size was 2.93.

Age spread: 24.3% under the age of 18, 7.9% from 18 to 24, 28.6% from 25 to 44, 24.3% from 45 to 64, and 14.8% who were 65 years of age or older. The median age was 37 years. For every 100 females, there were 110.0 males. For every 100 females age 18 and over, there were 104.3 males.

The median income for a household in the city was $28,929, and the median income for a family was $35,833. Males had a median income of $29,000 versus $17,500 for females. The per capita income for the city was $15,211. About 3.8% of families and 3.6% of the population were below the poverty line, including 6.7% of those under the age of eighteen and none of those 65 or over.

== Education ==
The Akron–Westfield Community School District operates area public schools. The district formed on July 1, 1981, as a merger of the Akron and Westfield school districts. Akron–Westfield Senior High School is the local high school.

== Popular culture ==
Westfield is the purported home town of the central character, Jack Smurch, in James Thurber's 1931 short story "The Greatest Man in the World." In the story, the fictional Smurch flies a second-hand, single-motored monoplane in July 1937 all the way around the world, without stopping.
