= Swanson (disambiguation) =

Swanson is a brand of frozen and canned foods.

Swanson may also refer to:

== Places ==
=== United States ===
- Swanson River, Alaska
- Swanson Science Center, academic building at Washington & Jefferson College, Washington, Pennsylvania

=== Other countries ===
- Swanson, Saskatchewan, a hamlet in Canada
- Swanson, New Zealand, an outlying suburb of Auckland, New Zealand
  - Swanson Railway Station, the train station that serves the Auckland, New Zealand suburb
- Swanson Dock, Port of Melbourne, Australia

== Other ==
- Swanson (surname), people with the surname Swanson
- Swanson School of Engineering, a school of the University of Pittsburgh, United States
- USS Swanson, a US Navy destroyer
- Swanson Health Products, worldwide distributor of vitamins, supplements and natural health products
- Butters Stotch, South Park character originally named Swanson

== See also ==
- Swanston (disambiguation)
- Swanton (disambiguation)
