= Swanton =

Swanton may refer to:

== People ==
- Swanton (surname)

== Places ==
United Kingdom

- Swanton Abbott, village in Norfolk
- Swanton Morley, village in Norfolk
- Swanton Novers, village in Norfolk

United States

- Swanton, California, a small unincorporated community
- Swanton, Maryland, an unincorporated town
- Swanton, Nebraska, a village
- Swanton Township, Lucas County, Ohio
- Swanton, Ohio, a village
- Swanton (town), Vermont
  - Swanton (village), Vermont, within the town

== See also ==
- Swanson (disambiguation)
- Swanston (disambiguation)
