= USS Columbia (1862) =

Gunboat of the United States Navy

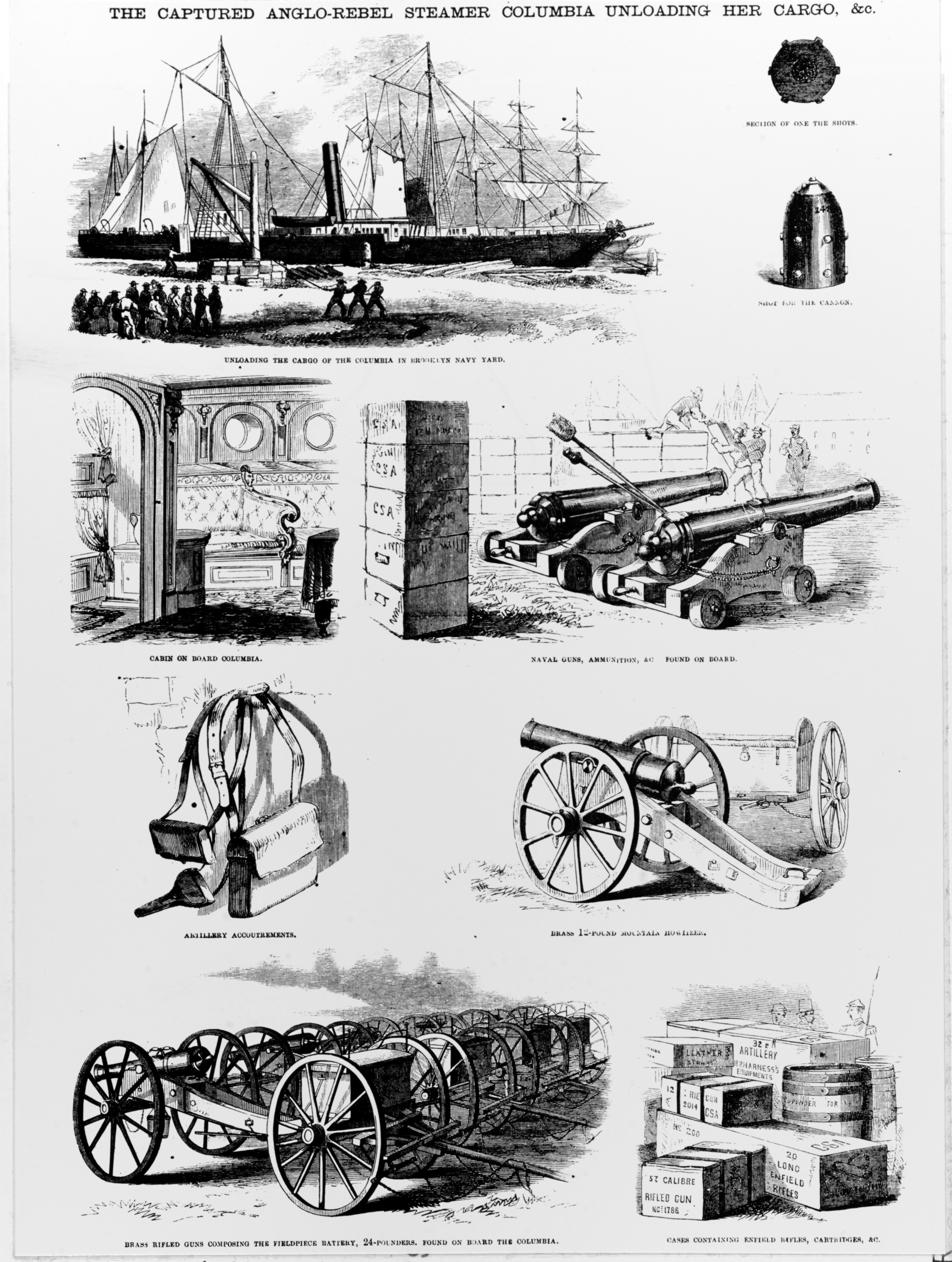
- USS Columbia.

History

United States
- Name: USS Columbia
- Acquired: 4 November 1862
- Commissioned: December 1862
- Out of service: 14 January 1863
- Captured: by Union Navy forces, 3 August 1862
- Fate: Ran aground, 14 January 1863

General characteristics
- Type: Patrol boat
- Displacement: 503 long tons (511 t)
- Length: 168 ft (51 m)
- Beam: 25 ft (7.6 m)
- Draft: 14 ft (4.3 m)
- Propulsion: Steam engine; screw-propelled
- Range: Ship complement=100
- Armament: 6 × 24-pounder smoothbore guns, 1 × 30-pounder rifle

USS Columbia was a steamer captured by the Union Navy during the American Civil War. She was used by the Union Navy to patrol navigable waterways of the Confederacy to prevent the South from trading with other countries.

== Service history ==
Columbia, a screw steamer was captured on 3 August 1862 by Santiago de Cuba while running the blockade off the coast of Florida; purchased by the Navy from the Key West, Florida Prize Court on 4 November 1862; outfitted at New York Navy Yard; and commissioned sometime in December, Acting Volunteer Lieutenant Joseph Pitty Couthouy in command. While serving with the North Atlantic Blockading Squadron off Wilmington, North Carolina, Columbia ran aground and was wrecked off Masonboro Inlet on 14 January 1863. Forty men of her crew — including her commanding officer — were captured by the Confederates.
