= Augustus Williams =

United States Medal of Honor recipient

- Born: 1842; Kristiansand, Norway
- Died: Unknown
- Military career
- Allegiance: United States of America; Union
- Branch: United States Navy; Union Navy
- Rank: Seaman
- Unit: USS Santiago de Cuba (1861)
- Conflicts: American Civil War • Second Battle of Fort Fisher
- Awards: Medal of Honor

Augustus Williams (1842 – unknown) was a seaman in the U.S. Navy stationed aboard the USS Santiago de Cuba (1861) during the American Civil War. He received the Medal of Honor for his actions during the Second Battle of Fort Fisher on January 15, 1865.

== Military service ==
Emigrating from his native Norway, Williams volunteered for service in the U.S. Navy and was assigned to the Union brig USS Santiago de Cuba (1861). His enlistment is credited to the state of Massachusetts.

On January 15, 1865, the North Carolina Confederate stronghold of Fort Fisher was taken by a combined Union storming party of sailors, marines, and soldiers under the command of Admiral David Dixon Porter and General Alfred Terry.

== Medal of Honor citation ==
The President of the United States of America, in the name of Congress, takes pleasure in presenting the Medal of Honor to Seaman Augustus Williams, United States Navy, for extraordinary heroism in action while serving on board the U.S.S. Santiago de Cuba during the assault by the fleet on Fort Fisher, North Carolina on 15 January 1865. When the landing party to which he was attached charged on the fort with a cheer, and with determination to plant their colors on the ramparts, Seaman Williams remained steadfast when they reached the foot of the fort and more than two-thirds of the marines and sailors fell back in panic. Taking cover when the enemy concentrated his fire on the remainder of the group, he alone remained with his executive officer, subsequently withdrawing from the field after darkness.

General Orders: War Department, General Orders No. 59 (June 22, 1865)

Action Date: January 15, 1865

Service: Navy

Rank: Seaman

Division: U.S.S. Santiago de Cuba

== See also ==
- List of Medal of Honor recipients
- List of American Civil War Medal of Honor recipients: T–Z
