= John Griffiths (Medal of Honor) =

- Born: 1835; Wales
- Died: Unknown; Massachusetts, US
- Burial place: Sailors Home Cemetery, Wollaston, Massachusetts
- Military career
- Allegiance: United States of America; Union
- Branch: United States Navy; Union Navy
- Service years: 1864–1865
- Rank: Captain of the Forecastle
- Unit: USS Santiago de Cuba
- Conflicts: American Civil War • Second Battle of Fort Fisher
- Awards: Medal of Honor

John Griffiths (born 1835) was a sailor in the U.S. Navy during the American Civil War. He received the Medal of Honor for his actions during the Second Battle of Fort Fisher on January 15, 1865.

== Military service ==
Emigrating from his native Wales, Griffiths volunteered for service in the Union Army 8 April 1864 as a private in the 20th Massachusetts Infantry. He enlisted from Barnstable. On May 17, 1864, Griffiths was transferred to the U.S. Navy as a seaman and was assigned via the receiving ship USS Ohio to the Union brig USS Santiago de Cuba (1861). His enlistment is credited to the state of Massachusetts.

On January 15, 1865, the North Carolina Confederate stronghold of Fort Fisher was taken by a combined Union storming party of sailors, marines, and soldiers under the command of Admiral David Dixon Porter and General Alfred Terry. Griffiths was a member of the storming party.

== Medal of Honor citation ==
The President of the United States of America, in the name of Congress, takes pleasure in presenting the Medal of Honor to Captain of the Forecastle John Griffiths, United States Navy, for extraordinary heroism in action while serving on board the U.S.S. Santiago de Cuba during the assault on Fort Fisher, North Carolina, on 15 January 1865. As one of a boat crew detailed to one of the generals on shore, Captain of the Forecastle Griffiths bravely entered the fort in the assault and accompanied his party in carrying dispatches at the height of the battle. He was one of six men who entered the fort in the assault from the fleet.

General Orders: War Department, General Orders No. 59 (June 22, 1865)

Action Date: January 15, 1865

Service: Navy

Rank: Captain of the Forecastle

Division: U.S.S. Santiago de Cuba

== See also ==
- List of Medal of Honor recipients
- List of American Civil War Medal of Honor recipients: A–F
- Massachusetts Soldiers, Sailors, and Marines in the Civil War, Vol VIII, pg 106
- Fold3
