= Swanston =

Swanston may refer to:

== Places ==
Australia

- Swanston Street, Melbourne
- Swanston, Tasmania, a rural locality in Australia

UK

- Swanston, Edinburgh, a village in Scotland

US

- Swanston (Sacramento RT), a light rail station in California
- Swanston Estates, a neighborhood in North Sacramento, California

== Other uses ==
- HMS Swanston, a Ton class minesweeper
- Swanston (surname)

== See also ==
- Swanson (disambiguation)
- Swanton (disambiguation)
