= USS Queen =

Cargo ship of the United States Navy

History

United States
- Name: USS Queen
- Launched: 1860
- Completed: 1861
- Acquired: 29 September 1863
- Commissioned: 15 August 1863
- Decommissioned: 21 June 1865
- Maiden voyage: 28 January 1861
- Stricken: 1865 (est.)
- Captured: by Union Navy forces; 21 June 1863
- Fate: Sold, 16 October 1865

General characteristics
- Displacement: 630 tons
- Length: 168 ft 8 in (51.41 m)
- Beam: 28 ft 4 in (8.64 m)
- Draft: 9 ft 9 in (2.97 m)
- Depth of hold: 13 ft (4.0 m)
- Propulsion: steam engine; screw-propelled
- Speed: not known
- Complement: 83
- Armament: three 32-pounder guns; one 12-pounder rifled gun

USS Queen was a steamer captured by the Union Navy during the American Civil War. She was used by the Navy as a supply ship.

== Capture of a British steamer, conversion to Union Navy supply ship ==
On 21 June 1863, Union side wheel steamer USS Santiago de Cuba captured blockade running British steamer Victory off Palmetto Point, Eleuthera Island after a long chase. The prize had slipped out of Wilmington, North Carolina, laden with cotton, tobacco and turpentine and was sent to Boston, Massachusetts, where she was condemned by the Boston Prize Court. Renamed Queen 1 August 1863, she was purchased by the Navy 29 September 1863, and commissioned 15 August 1863, Acting Master Robert Tarr in command.

== Supporting the Union Navy ships and bases of the Gulf Coast blockade ==
Fitted out as a transport and supply ship, Queen departed Boston 4 December for New Orleans, Louisiana, where she arrived 9 January 1864. For the remainder of the war, she operated between northern ports and the gulf, stopping frequently en route to serve Union ships and bases along the Confederate coast.

== End-of-war decommissioning and sale ==
After the war ended, Queen decommissioned at New York Navy Yard 21 June 1865 and was sold at New York City 16 October 1865 to Smith and Dunning.

== See also ==
- Union Blockade
