= William Swanson =

William Swanson may refer to:

- William Swanson (artist) (born 1970), Californian painter
- William Swanson (Nebraska politician) (1922–2007), American politician from Nebraska
- William Swanson (New Zealand politician) (1819–1903), New Zealand politician
- William H. Swanson (born 1949), chairman and chief executive officer of Raytheon Company
- Bill Swanson (baseball) (1888–1954), United States Major League Baseball player
