= USS Santiago de Cuba =

Gunboat of the United States Navy

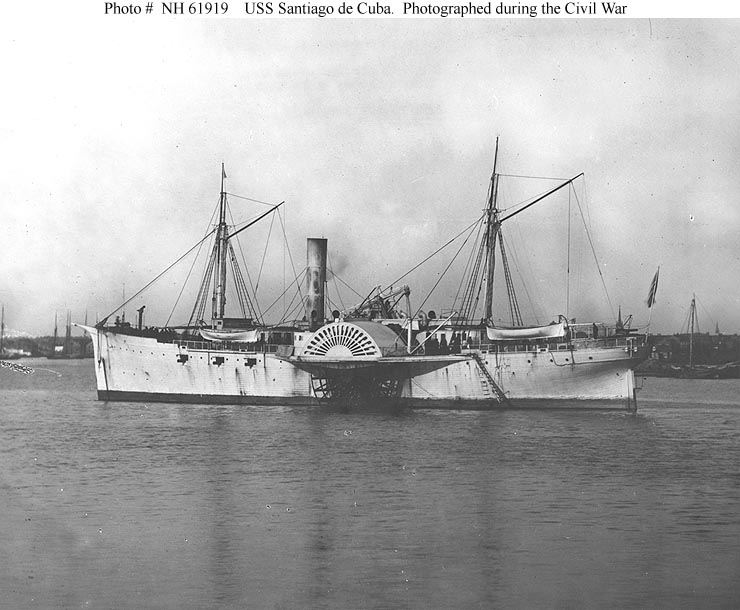
- USS Santiago de Cuba (1861)

History

United States Navy
- Name: USS Santiago de Cuba
- Builder: Jeremiah Simonson
- Cost: $200,000
- Launched: 2 April 1861 at Brooklyn, New York
- Acquired: 6 September 1861
- Commissioned: 5 November 1861
- Decommissioned: 17 June 1865
- Fate: sold, 21 September 1865

United States
- Name: Santiago de Cuba
- Cost: $108,000
- Acquired: 21 September 1865
- Out of service: 1886
- Identification: Official Number 22825; Signal letters H.R.G.N

United States
- Name: Marion
- Owner: F. H. & A. H. Chappell Company
- Acquired: 1886
- Out of service: 1899

General characteristics
- Displacement: 1,567 tons
- Length: 229 ft (70 m)
- Beam: 38 ft (12 m)
- Draft: 16 ft 2 in (4.93 m) (max.)
- Depth of hold: 27 ft (8.2 m)
- Propulsion: sail and steam engine; side wheel-propelled
- Speed: 14 knots
- Complement: 114 officers and enlisted
- Armament: two 20-pounder Parrott rifles; eight 32-pounder guns

USS Santiago de Cuba was a side-wheel steamship acquired by the Union Navy during the first year of the American Civil War. She was outfitted as a gunboat with powerful 20-pounder rifled guns and 32-pounder cannon and was assigned to the Union blockade of the Confederate States of America. She was notably successful in this role, capturing several blockade runners. Her last major action of the war was the assault on Fort Fisher, during which seven of her crew won the Medal of Honor.

After the war she was sold by the Navy and began a long career of commercial service as a passenger liner and freighter. It is evident from the string of short assignments with a variety of shipping lines that she was not ideally suited for this role. Her paddlewheel propulsion and wooden hull were already obsolescing at the time of the Civil War, when modern ships were constructed with propellers and iron hulls. By one account, she was the last paddlewheel steamer to cross the Atlantic. Finally, in 1886, her engine was removed and she was converted into a barge for transporting coal. She disappears from Federal records in 1899 and her ultimate fate is unknown.

== Construction and characteristics ==
Santiago de Cuba was commissioned by Valiente & Co. of Cuba. As the project developed, Valiente and other Cuban shareholders joined with American financiers and lawyers to form a New York Corporation, the Cuba and New York Steamship Company. The ship was intended to establish a steamship line between New York City and Santiago de Cuba. Her original cost was estimated to be $140,000. Her hull was built in Jeremiah Simonson's shipyard in Greenpoint, Brooklyn, New York. Construction was begun in 1860 and she was launched on 2 April 1861.

Her frame was constructed of white oak, hackmatack, and chestnut, reinforced with iron strapping. Her hull planking was white oak. She was 229 feet (70 m) long, with a beam of 38 feet (12 m), and a depth of hold of 27 feet (8.2 m). She had a fully loaded draft of 16 feet 2 inches (4.93 m) and a displacement of 1,567 tons. She had two decks. As originally built, she had 50 first-class staterooms, a dining room, and a lady's salon.

The ship was propelled by side-mounted paddlewheels which were 29 feet (8.8 m) in diameter and 9.5 feet (2.9 m) wide. They were powered by a walking beam steam engine. The engine was built by Neptune Iron Works of New York City. Its one-cylinder had a diameter of 67 inches (1.7 m) and a stroke of 12 feet (3.7 m). Steam was provided by two coal-fired boilers. Her maximum speed was 14 knots. She was also capable of sailing and was brigantine-rigged.

In 1877 Santiago de Cuba was converted from a paddle-wheel steamer to a propeller steamer at the Philadelphia shipyard of Neafie and Levy. Her paddle wheels, boilers, steam engine, and associated machinery were removed and portions of her hull rebuilt to accommodate the new propulsion system. Record of her new power plant has been lost, but those of Morro Castle survive. She was also owned by the Clyde Lines and converted at the same time at the same shipyard, so her new equipment was likely similar if not identical to Santiago de Cuba's. Morro Castle's new engine had a single cylinder 50 inches (130 cm) in diameter with a stroke of 5 feet (1.5 m).

The ship's namesake was the port of Santiago de Cuba, the destination of her original route from New York. There is ample evidence, both in official Navy communications and in her Federal documentation as a merchant ship, that her name was "Santiago de Cuba". Nonetheless, various contemporaneous newspaper reports and other print materials refer to her with an Anglicized version of her name, "St. Jago de Cuba".

== Cuba and New York Steamship Company (1861) ==
Santiago de Cuba's service to her original owner was destined to be short. On 15 June 1861 the ship sailed on her maiden voyage from New York for Havana and her namesake, Santiago de Cuba. Her second trip departed New York on 18 July 1861. On 19 August 1861 she arrived back in New York from her last trip for the Cuba and New York Steamship Company. In addition to her passengers, she carried a cargo of sugar, molasses, coffee, and cocoa nuts.

== Civil War service (1861–1865) ==
After a month of negotiations, on 6 September 1861 Santiago de Cuba was purchased by the Navy for $200,000. She was moved to the New York Navy Yard for refitting as a naval vessel. There she was armed with eight 32-pound carronades and two 20-pound Parrott rifles. Her naval crew was reported to be 16 officers and 104 enlisted men plus a unit of Marines. She was commissioned at the Navy Yard on 5 November 1861, and sailed for Havana, Cuba on 7 November 1861, with Commander Daniel B. Ridgely as her captain.

=== Gulf of Mexico blockade duty ===
During the Civil War, the Union Navy imposed a blockade on Confederate ports both to stop agricultural exports that were a substantial part of the South's economy, and to limit the import of arms and manufactured goods which would support Confederate armies. Enforcing the blockade was Santiago de Cuba's primary mission during the war.

Santiago de Cuba was assigned to the East Gulf Blockading Squadron commanded by Flag Officer W. W. McKean, and ordered to Havana, Cuba. She arrived there on 17 November 1862. On 3 December, she captured British blockade runner Victoria at sea some 90 miles west of Point Isabel, Texas, and Ridgely sent the prize to Galveston, Texas. Four days later, she chased and overtook British schooner, Eugenia Smith, but released her for want of evidence justifying a seizure.

Santiago de Cuba sailed again from Havana on 13 March 1862. She went to Galveston to warn USS Santee of possible blockade runners and then sailed east along the coast. East of the Sabine River she encountered a river steamer loaded with cotton. Santiago de Cuba fired on the ship, but rather than surrender, the crew of the steamer grounded her and set her on fire. Santiago De Cuba reached port at Key West on than 28 March 1862.

McKean ordered Santiago de Cuba back to Havana to take on a full load of coal on 28 March 1862. After coaling, she was ordered to patrol between Cape Canaveral, Florida and Providence Channel, a deep-water route through the Bahamas archipelago. Since British sympathies were with the Confederacy, the Bahamas became a transshipment point for commerce between the Confederacy and Europe. Santiago de Cuba was tasked to stop this traffic. The ship sailed from Havana on 5 April 1862.

About 100 miles offshore of Charleston, South Carolina on 23 April 1862, Santiago de Cuba captured a schooner without a name, papers, or flag, but which was loaded with cotton. A prize crew was put aboard and the schooner was sent to Key West. Two days later, 25 April 1862, Ridgely captured the steamer Ella Warley (ex-Isabel), and put a prize crew of 27 men aboard. Her cargo was found to be rifles, swords, and other contraband. The next day, 26 April 1862, while still in convoy with Ella Warley, she captured another blockade runner, the schooner Mersey of Charleston. On 30 April, he took yet another schooner, Maria of Charleston. Having already detached 59 men for prize crews, Ridgely decided he could afford no more. He sailed to New York with his three captures, where he arrived on 4 May 1862.

On 24 May 1862, Santiago de Cuba sailed from New York, bound for Key West to return to her blockade duties. While en route, she captured to schooner Lucy C. Holmes, laden with cotton, which had sailed from Charleston, South Carolina bound for Nassau. Commander Ridgeway placed a prize crew aboard and sent her to Boston.

Upon her return to Key West, Santiago de Cuba was ordered to cruise between Cape San Antonio and Yucatán Bank, to close to Yucatán Channel to blockade runners. By 12 July 1862, she was back in Key West taking on coal.

For her next cruise, she was sent back to the waters off the Bahamas. On 3 August 1862 the ship encountered the steamer Columbia to the northeast of Providence Channel. After a six-hour chase, the steamer was captured. Columbia was a modern iron-hulled, propeller-driven ship. She was laden with armaments including eight 6-pounder cannon, 2000 Enfield rifles, gunpowder, shells, cartridges, and 83 bales of army blankets marked "C.S.A", altogether reported to be worth $200,000. A prize crew was embarked and Santiago de Cuba escorted the steamer to Key West, where they arrived on 6 August 1862. Two of the Austrian 6-pounder cannons captured by Santiago de Cuba are on display in Leutze Park at the Washington Navy Yard.

During her next cruise, on 27 August 1862, she captured the schooner Lavinia, which had sailed from Wilmington, North Carolina with a load of turpentine for Nassau. Commander Ridgely sent her with a prize crew to Key West.

=== Searching for commerce raiders and blockade runners ===
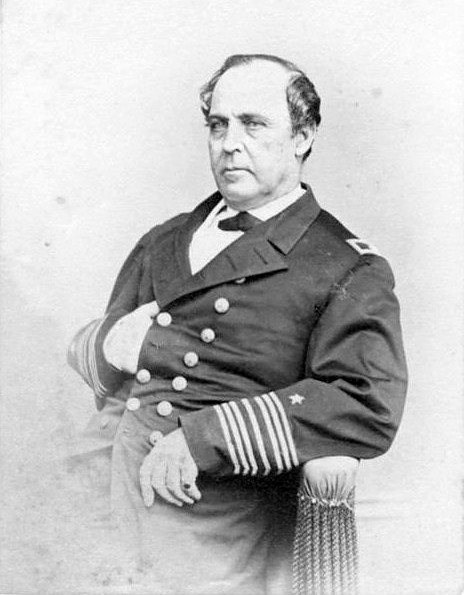
Oliver S. Glisson, captain of Santiago de Cuba from 1864 to 1865

On 8 September 1862, Secretary of the Navy Gideon Welles reassigned Santiago de Cuba to a newly organized "Flying Squadron," created to seek out and capture Confederate commerce raiders Alabama and Florida. The squadron fell under the command of Commodore Charles Wilkes.

Commander Robert H. Wyman became the captain of Santiago De Cuba sometime in early 1863. On 21 June 1863, she and her new captain overtook the Victory off Palmetto Point, Eleuthera Island, ending a long chase after the British steamer had slipped through the blockade off Charleston with a cargo of 1,000 bales of cotton, tobacco, and turpentine. On 25 June 1863, she took the iron-hulled steamer Britannia in the same area. On 15 July, she boarded steamer, Lizzie, off the Florida coast and sent that prize to Key West. Under admiralty law of the times, the crews that captured enemy ships were entitled to a share of the value of those ships. Wyman's prize money from Victory and Britannia was $23,484.71.

On 7 December 1863, Santiago De Cuba arrived in Boston, now under the command of Captain Theodore P. Green. Green was detached and the ship decommissioned for repairs on 30 December 1863. She was dry-docked and her repairs were effected at the Boston Navy Yard. In May 1864, Captain Oliver S. Glisson was ordered to take command of the ship.

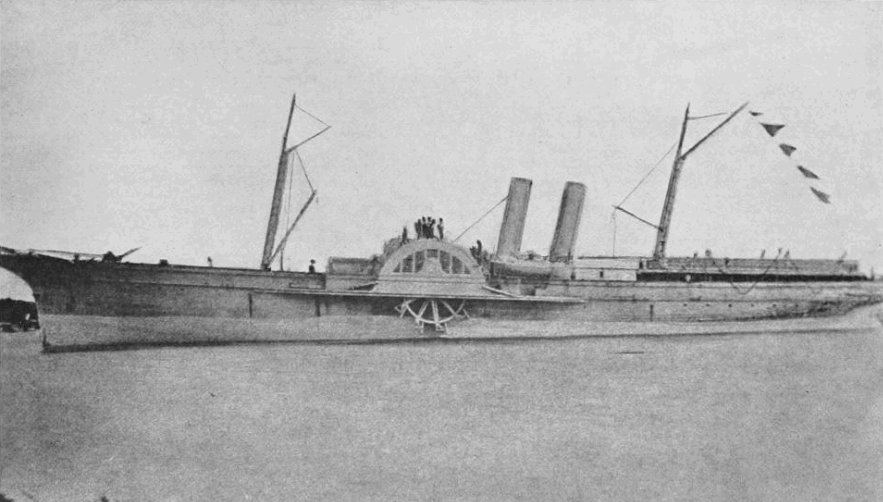
A. D. Vance after she was taken by Santiago de Cuba

Overhaul completed, the ship was recommissioned on 6 June 1864. On 12 September 1864 Santiago de Cuba took the steamer A. D. Vance (ex-Lord Clyde) northeast of Wilmington, North Carolina. She was laden with 420 bales of cotton en route from Wilmington to Halifax. On 2 November 1864, the iron-hulled steamer Lucy was captured by Santiago de Cuba about 160 miles off Wilmington. She had on board 365 bales of cotton and 25 tons of tobacco. The Lucy had on board the Confederate soldier and poet Sidney Lanier.

=== Assaults on Fort Fisher ===
In late 1864, the ship was reassigned from blockade duty to the North Atlantic Squadron commanded by Rear Admiral David Dixon Porter. Santiago de Cuba sailed in support of the attack on Fort Fisher at the mouth of the Cape Fear River on Christmas Eve, 1864. During the operation, Santiago de Cuba protected the landing troops by shelling the Flag Pond artillery battery. She took off 65 Confederate soldiers who surrendered. While the guns of the fort were silenced, the landing force was unable to take the bastion and were withdrawn.

Porter immediately began work on a new invasion plan, this time with a different army general. Porter's fleet got underway from Fortress Monroe on January 12, 1865. By 11 pm on 13 January 1865, the fleet had once again anchored off of Fort Fisher. The bombardment of shore facilities, in which Santiago de Cuba participated, began at dawn on the 14th. The army landed troops and Santiago de Cuba led seven other vessels in a creeping bombardment in front of them as they advanced on the fort. The ships boats, meanwhile, were used to land artillery for the army. On 15 January 1865, Santiago de Cuba led "line of battle No. 3", consisting of at least seven ships, to shell the southeast face of Fort Fisher. The ship was hit at least three times by Confederate artillery.

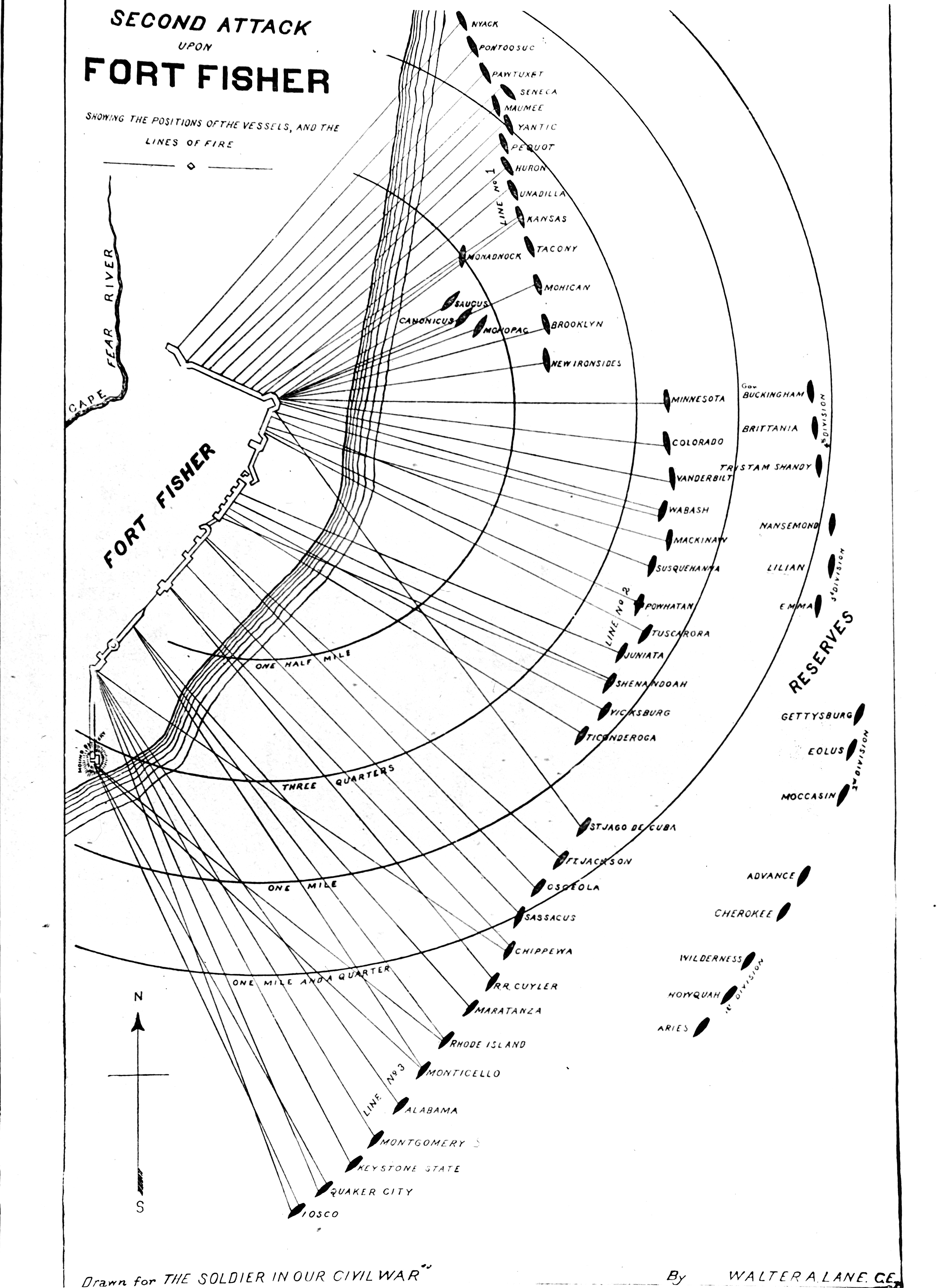
Santiago de Cuba (shown here as St. Jago de Cuba) led line of battle No.3 in the successful attack on Fort Fisher

There then occurred a singular event in U.S. Navy history. On 15 January 1865, fourteen hundred sailors and marines were organized into a separate landing party to assault the fort from a different direction than the main army landings. The sailors and marines fought a bloody melee with the Confederate troops, but about 30 reached the top of the fort's parapet and briefly managed to plant the U.S. flag there. They were shortly swept back, but the furious assault drew defending troops away from the main army attack which then succeeded in breaking into the fort and capturing it. In all the history of the U.S. Navy only 749 Medals of Honor have been awarded to sailors. Seven of them were crewmen of Santiago de Cuba who took part in the land assault on Fort Fisher. They were:

- Philip Bazaar, Ordinary Seaman, U.S. Navy
- John Griffiths, Captain of the Forecastle, U.S. Navy
- George Province, Ordinary Seaman, U.S. Navy
- Auzella Savage, Ordinary Seaman, U.S. Navy
- John Swanson, Seaman, U.S. Navy
- Edward Swatton, Seaman, U.S. Navy
- Augustus Williams, Seaman, U.S. Navy

At least five Santiago de Cuba sailors were wounded in the engagement.

At the war's end, Santiago de Cuba carried Assistant Secretary of the Navy Gustavus Fox, Captain Robert Anderson and John George Nicolay, Private Secretary to President Lincoln, to Charleston for the ceremonial re-raising of the flag at Fort Sumter on Friday, 14 April 1865. This ceremony was intended to celebrate the end of the Civil War precipitated by Robert E. Lee's surrender on 9 April 1865.

The Navy moved quickly to reduce its fleet after the war. Santiago de Cuba was decommissioned on 17 June 1865 at the Philadelphia Navy Yard. She was sold at public auction at the Philadelphia Navy Yard on 21 September 1865. She was bought by Marshall O. Roberts of the Central American Transit Company for $108,000.

== Central American service (1865–1868) ==
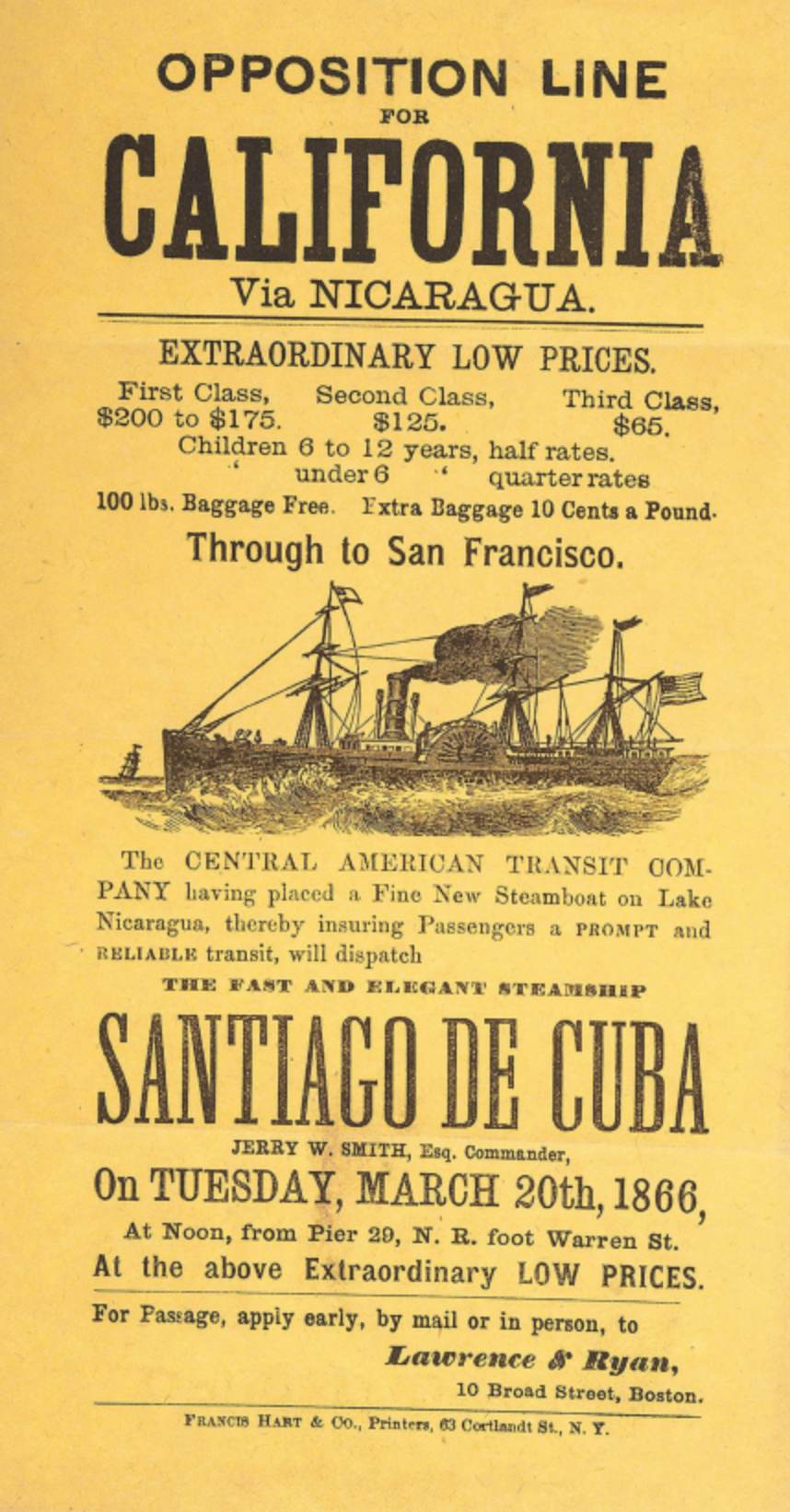
1866 advertisement for Santiago de Cuba as part of the Central American Transit Company. Note that the illustration is not of the ship advertised.

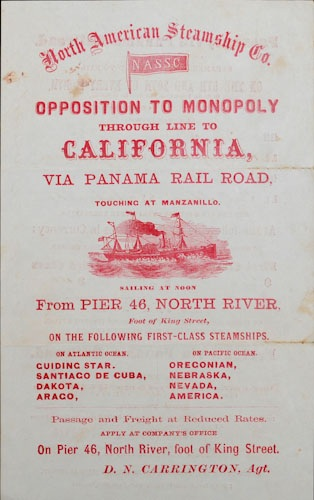
Advertisement for Santiago de Cuba as part of the North American Steamship Company

Cornelius Vanderbilt pioneered a transcontinental shipping route across Nicaragua in 1851. With the transcontinental railroad still a few years into the future, this Central American sea route was still a viable business when the Civil War ended. Ocean-going steamers would sail from New York to San Juan de Nicaragua. Shallow draft river steamers would carry passengers up the San Juan River and across Lake Nicaragua. A 15-mile carriage ride would take them to the Pacific coast where other ocean-going steamers would leave for San Francisco. Santiago de Cuba sailed the New York to Nicaragua leg of this route.

After her purchase from the Navy, Santiago de Cuba was registered as a civilian passenger ship. Her interior was rebuilt to convert her from warship to passenger liner. Her first sailing for the Central American Transit Company left New York for San Juan de Nicaragua on 20 November 1865. She made one round trip per month and did good business. She reached New York on 7 June 1866 with 554 passengers and $125,000 of gold on board. On 8 July 1866 she returned to New York with 407 passengers. This pleasant routine was broken on Saintiago de Cuba's September sailing. She left New York on 29 September 1866. Four days into the trip she was struck by a storm with high winds and heavy seas. Two passengers and two crew were washed overboard and lost. The stem, rudder, and deck house were damaged and the ship was forced to turn back to New York for repairs, where she arrived 7 October 1866. The ship was repaired and resumed her commute between New York and San Juan de Nicaragua in November 1866.

In April 1866, the principals of the Central American Transit Company, led by William H. Webb, and Marshall O. Roberts, rebranded their business as the North American Steamship Company and Santiago de Cuba thereafter sailed under the new banner. In January 1867 control of the company was sold by the investor group led by Roberts to one led by Webb.

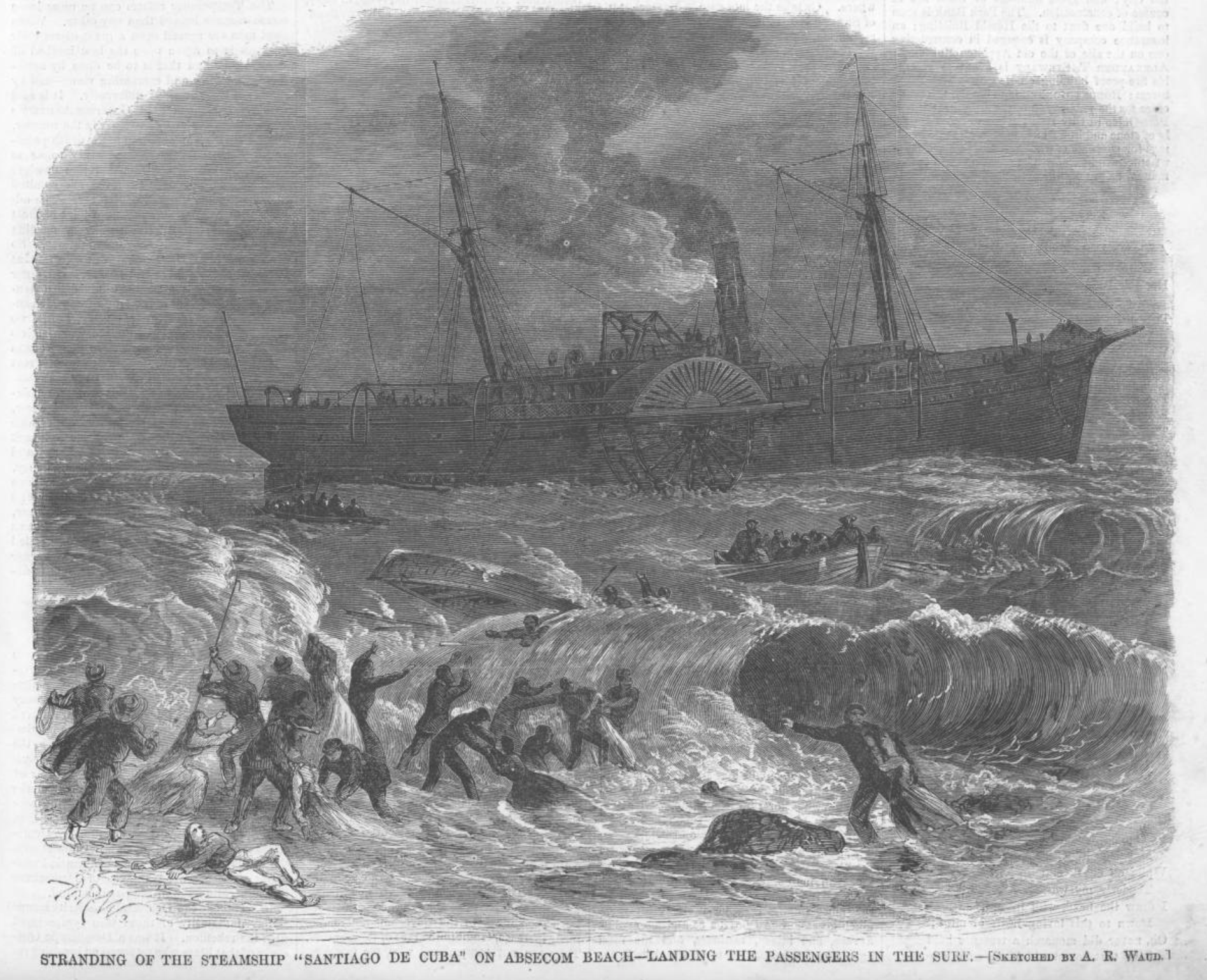
Santiago de Cuba grounded on the New Jersey Coast on 22 May 1867

On 22 May 1867 Santiago de Cuba was on her way back to New York from Nicaragua with 340 passengers aboard. The night was foggy and the ship grounded on the sandy shore near Cape May, at Absecon beach, New Jersey. While the ship was in no immediate danger, prudence called for landing the passengers before weather turned for the worse, or the surf began to break-up the vessel. Unfortunately, one of the boats headed for shore was upset by the surf and capsized. Five passengers and two crewmen drowned. The ship was towed off the sandbank, leaking badly, on 7 June 1867.

In December 1867, The North American Steamship Company began sailing to Panama rather than Nicaragua. Santiago de Cuba's first trip to Aspinwall, Panama left New York on 14 December 1867. She completed one round trip per month. On her 8 June 1868 sailing she carried the outlaw Jesse James from New York to Panama. He was on his way to Paso Robles, California where he stayed with an uncle over the winter of 1868–1869.

On 28 October 1868 Santiago de Cuba arrived back in New York from Panama for the last time during her Central American service. She had completed eighteen roundtrips to Nicaragua and eight to Panama.

== Ship for hire (1868–1886) ==
After William Webb abandoned the Central America business, he chartered Santiago de Cuba when he could, sailed her occasionally for his own business, and tried to sell her. Many of the charters were of relatively short duration, and there were gaps of months and even years between sailings when Webb was unable to find employment for the ship. It is evident from this pattern of service that the Santiago de Cuba was no longer a foundational part of any fleet, but rather a short-term replacement for more capable ships that were under construction or repair.

=== New York and Havana Mail Line (1868–1869) ===
Santiago de Cuba began sailing for the New York and Havana Mail Line owned by F. Alexandre & Sons in December 1868. She made three round trips for the company sailing from New York to Havana, Cuba to New Orleans, Louisiana and back. She returned to New York for the final time at the end of February 1869.

=== Ruger's American Line (1869) ===
The three Ruger brothers developed a small, short-lived steamship line between New York and Northern Europe. Santiago de Cuba made one trans-Atlantic trip for Ruger's American Line. Advertising began on 30 May 1869 and she sailed from New York on 16 June 1869. She stopped at Cowes on the Isle of Wight, Bremen, Germany, and finally reached Copenhagen, Denmark. A first-class passage was $90, second-class was $60, and steerage was $22, payable in gold. On the return voyage to New York, she carried 423 passengers, many of them immigrants. She arrived in New York on 18 August 1869.

=== Dispatch Line (1869) ===
Santiago de Cuba sailed one trip between New York and New Orleans for N. H. Brigham's Dispatch Line. She departed New York on 6 November 1869 and arrived in Louisiana on 15 November 1869.

=== North American Steamship Company (1869–1870) ===
At the end of her trip to New Orleans for the Dispatch Line, Webb sent Santiago de Cuba to Le Havre with a stop in Bermuda. She arrived in France on 29 December 1869. She sailed back for New York on 16 January 1870. On 1 February 1870 Santiago de Cuba was inbound to New York when she met the steamer Brunette leaving port. The latter ship attempted to avoid a collision by crossing in front of Santiago de Cuba. She did not make it. Off Squam Beach, New Jersey, Santiago de Cuba crashed into Brunette's port side splintering her hull. Brunette sank in minutes, taking with her two of her crew. Santiago de Cuba was also damaged, and limped into New York leaking badly, but with the rest of Brunette's crew aboard. In the subsequent lawsuit, Santiago de Cuba was found at fault for the collision.

Repairs were made and Santiago de Cuba resumed her trans-Atlantic sailings. Webb dispatched her from New York on 3 September 1870 and she arrived in Le Havre on 22 September 1870. Several North American Steamship Company vessels, including Santiago de Cuba, were reported to carry American armaments to Le Havre during the Franco-Prussian War. On her next trip she sailed to Bordeaux, reaching port on 18 October 1870. On this trip she touched at Brouwershaven and Rotterdam before sailing home to New York where she arrived on 21 November 1870. After this trip she was idle for two years as Webb was unable to charter her.

=== Columbian Mail Steam Packet Line (1873) ===
On 26 March 1873, she began sailing for the Columbian Mail Steam Packet Line run by O. I. Guilleaume and Company. Santiago de Cuba sailed between New York, Havana, and Matanzas, Cuba. She made a second trip in May 1873.

After this last trip to Cuba, Santiago de Cuba was idled again, this time for three years while Webb sought additional charters or a purchaser. Finally, in 1876 the ship was sold to William P. Clyde and Company of Philadelphia. Clyde took the extraordinary step of removing her boilers, steam engine, paddle wheels and associated machinery and rebuilding her as a propeller steamer. She was one of only two paddle-wheelers known to have undergone such a radical conversion. After her refit, Clyde used Santiago de Cuba much as Webb had, mixing charters and sailings for his own company as opportunities presented themselves.

=== Pacific Mail Steamship Company (1877) ===
Santiago de Cuba was chartered to the Pacific Mail Steamship Company. She left Philadelphia with a load of 1,500 tons of coal suitable for steamboat use, bound for Aspinwall. She arrived there on 22 September 1877. She returned to New York on 24 October 1877.

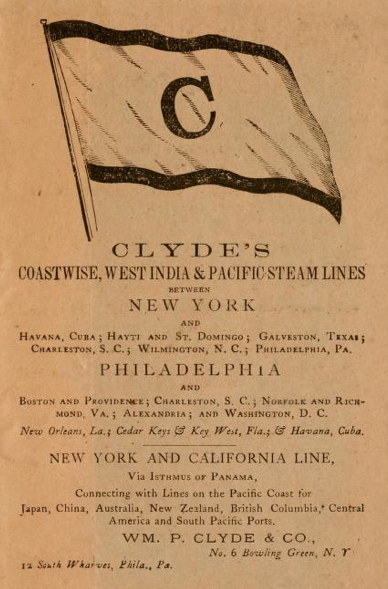
1876 advertisement for Clyde's steamship lines. Santiago de Cuba sailed the New York to Cuba route.

=== New York and Charleston Steamship Company (1877–1878) ===
Clyde negotiated another charter for Santiago de Cuba that began promptly after her return from Panama. James W. Quintard and Company used her to provide regular service between New York and Charleston, South Carolina. She completed two round trips per month. She cleared New York for Charleston for the first time on 1 November 1877. She completed her sailings to Charleston in April 1878.

=== New York and Havana Direct Mail Line (1878–1881) ===
William P. Clyde took Santiago de Cuba off charter to support his newly established New York and Havana Direct Mail Line in May 1878. The ship made one or two round trips a month between the two ports.

At the end of June 1879, Santiago de Cuba took a break from her runs to Cuba for a general overhaul at the Neafie and Levy shipyard. After three weeks undergoing repairs, on 19 July 1879, she sailed down the Delaware River on her way back to New York to resume her runs to Havana. The 1,194-ton iron-hulled steamship Scots Greys was heading upriver at the same time with a load of iron ore from Carthagena. The two ships collided off Gloucester, New Jersey. Santiago de Cuba hit Scots Greys on her port bow. Damage to the two ships was extensive, and both had to be towed to safety by nearby tugs. The subsequent lawsuit found Santiago de Cuba at fault for the collision.

The ship was repaired and continued her sailings between New York and Havana until March 1881.

=== Boston and Savanah Steamship Line (1881) ===
Santiago de Cuba was chartered briefly by the Boston and Savanna Steamship Line operated by F. Nickerson & Co. of Boston. She completed a dozen trips between June and December 1881.

Even after the dramatic replacement of her power plant in 1877, Santiago de Cuba was obsolescent. After her runs to Boston, Clyde was unable to find additional employment for the ship and she sat idle in Brooklyn's Erie Basin for the next five years.

== Schooner barge Marion (1886–1899) ==
Sometime in 1886 Santiago de Cuba was purchased by the F. H. & A. H. Chappell Company of New London Connecticut. She was converted to a schooner barge and renamed Marion. Her engine was removed and a third mast added. She could not sail on her own. She was towed by a tugboat and used her sails to help propel the hull in the event of a favorable wind. She was used for transporting coal. On the night of 17 December 1887, Marion was anchored in the Elizabeth River off Norfolk, Virginia with a full load of coal. She was struck by the steamer Guyandotte and sunk. She was raised by 14 May 1888 and placed back into service. The ship disappears from Federal registration in 1899. Her ultimate fate is unknown.
