= Joseph Pitty Couthouy =

American paleontologist

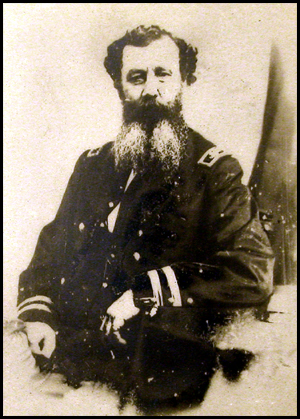
- Born: January 6, 1808; Boston, Massachusetts, U.S.
- Died: April 4, 1864 (aged 56) Red River, Louisiana, U.S.
- Allegiance: United States (Union)
- Branch: United States Navy
- Service years: 1862–1864
- Rank: Commander
- Commands: USS Columbia, USS Osage, USS Chillicothe
- Known for: U.S. Exploring Expedition (1838)
- Conflicts: American Civil War, Red River Campaign
- Spouse: Mary Greenwood Wild (m. 1832)
- Other work: Conchologist, Invertebrate Paleontologist

Joseph Pitty Couthouy (6 January 1808 – 4 April 1864) was an American naval officer, conchologist, and invertebrate palaeontologist. Born in Boston, Massachusetts, he entered the Boston Latin School in 1820. He married Mary Greenwood Wild on 9 March 1832.

Couthouy applied to President Andrew Jackson for a position on the Scientific Corps of the U.S. Navy's Exploring Expedition of 1838.

He sailed with the expedition on 18 August 1838, but was sent to the Sandwich Islands for sick leave. Eventually, he dismissed according to Charles Wilkes for attempting to "promote dissension, bring me into disrepute, and destroy the harmony and efficiency of the Squadron."

In 1854, he took command of an expedition to the Bay of Cumaná, where he spent three unsuccessful years in search of the wreck of the Spanish treasure ship San Pedro, lost there in the early part of the century.

A good linguist, he spoke fluent Spanish, French, Italian, and Portuguese, and had mastered several dialects used in the Pacific Islands.

In the American Civil War, Couthouy was ordered to command USS Columbia on 31 December 1862, which was wrecked, and Couthouy made prisoner. He later commanded USS Osage.

Finally, he commanded USS Chillicothe during the Red River Campaign. On 2 April 1864, he was shot by a sniper and died the following day.
