= Akron–Westfield Community School District =

Public school district in Akron, Iowa, United States

Coordinates: 42.831983°N 96.549195°W

Location
- Akron, Iowa Plymouth County United States
- Coordinates: 42.831983, -96.549195

District information
- Type: Local school district
- Grades: K–12
- Established: 1981
- Superintendent: Derek Briggs
- Schools: 3
- Budget: $9,636,000 (2020-21)
- NCES District ID: 1903220

Students and staff
- Students: 608 (2022-23)
- Teachers: 53.19 FTE
- Staff: 53.87 FTE
- Student–teacher ratio: 11.43
- Athletic conference: War Eagle Conference

Other information
- Website: www.akron-westfield.com

Akron–Westfield Community School District is a rural public school district headquartered in Akron, Iowa. It operates Akron–Westfield Elementary School and Akron–Westfield High School and Middle School in Akron.

The district, entirely in Plymouth County, serves Akron, Westfield, and the surrounding rural areas.

== History ==
The district formed on July 1, 1981, as a merger of the Akron and Westfield school districts.

Prior to December 2018, the district had proposed failed bond attempts two times. In 2018 the district proposed a $7 million bond, with the election scheduled for December 11 that year.

== Schools ==
The district operates three schools, all in a single facility in Akron:

- Akron–Westfield Elementary
- Akron–Westfield Middle School
- Akron–Westfield Senior High School

== See also ==
- List of school districts in Iowa
