= Akron, Iowa =

City in Plymouth County, Iowa, United States

Akron
- City
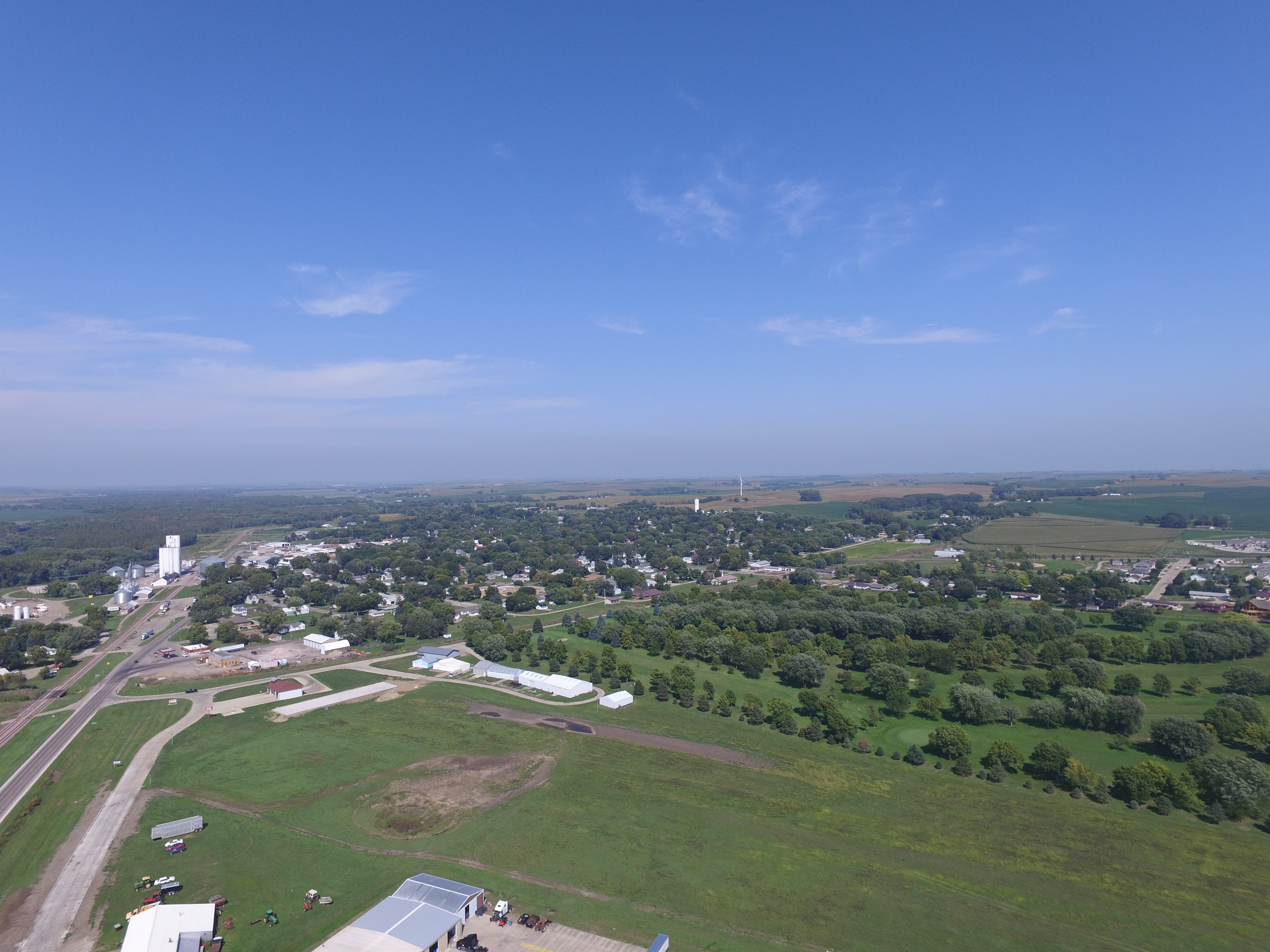
- Akron
- Motto: "The peaceful valley of opportunity"
- Location of Akron, Iowa

- Location within Iowa Location within the United States Location within North America
- Coordinates: 42°49′36″N 96°33′25″W
- Country: USA
- State: Iowa
- County: Plymouth

Government
  - Type: Mayor-council

Area
  - Total: 1.23 sq mi (3.19 km^{2})
  - Land: 1.23 sq mi (3.19 km^{2})
  - Water: 0 sq mi (0.00 km^{2})
- Elevation: 1,152 ft (351 m)

Population (2020)
  - Total: 1,558
  - Density: 1,264/sq mi (488.2/km^{2})
- Time zone: UTC-6 (Central (CST))
  - Summer (DST): UTC-5 (CDT)
- ZIP code: 51001
- Area code: 712
- FIPS code: 19-00775
- GNIS feature ID: 2393896
- Website: akronia.org

Akron is a city in Plymouth County, Iowa, United States. The population was 1,558 at the 2020 census.

== History ==
Akron was incorporated September 7, 1882. The town's name is a transfer from Akron, Ohio.

== Geography ==
According to the United States Census Bureau, the city has a total area of 1.22 square miles (3.16 km^{2}), all land. Akron is considered the northern gateway to the Loess Hills and the Loess Hills Scenic Byway. These unique hills made up of windblown soil stretch southward from Akron toward St. Joseph, Missouri.

== Demographics ==
Historical populations
Year	Pop.	±%
1890	494	—
1900	1,029	+108.3%
1910	1,130	+9.8%
1920	1,324	+17.2%
1930	1,304	−1.5%
1940	1,314	+0.8%
1950	1,251	−4.8%
1960	1,351	+8.0%
1970	1,324	−2.0%
1980	1,517	+14.6%
1990	1,450	−4.4%
2000	1,489	+2.7%
2010	1,486	−0.2%
2020	1,558	+4.8%
Source:"U.S. Census website". United States Census Bureau. and Iowa Data Center; Source: U.S. Decennial Census

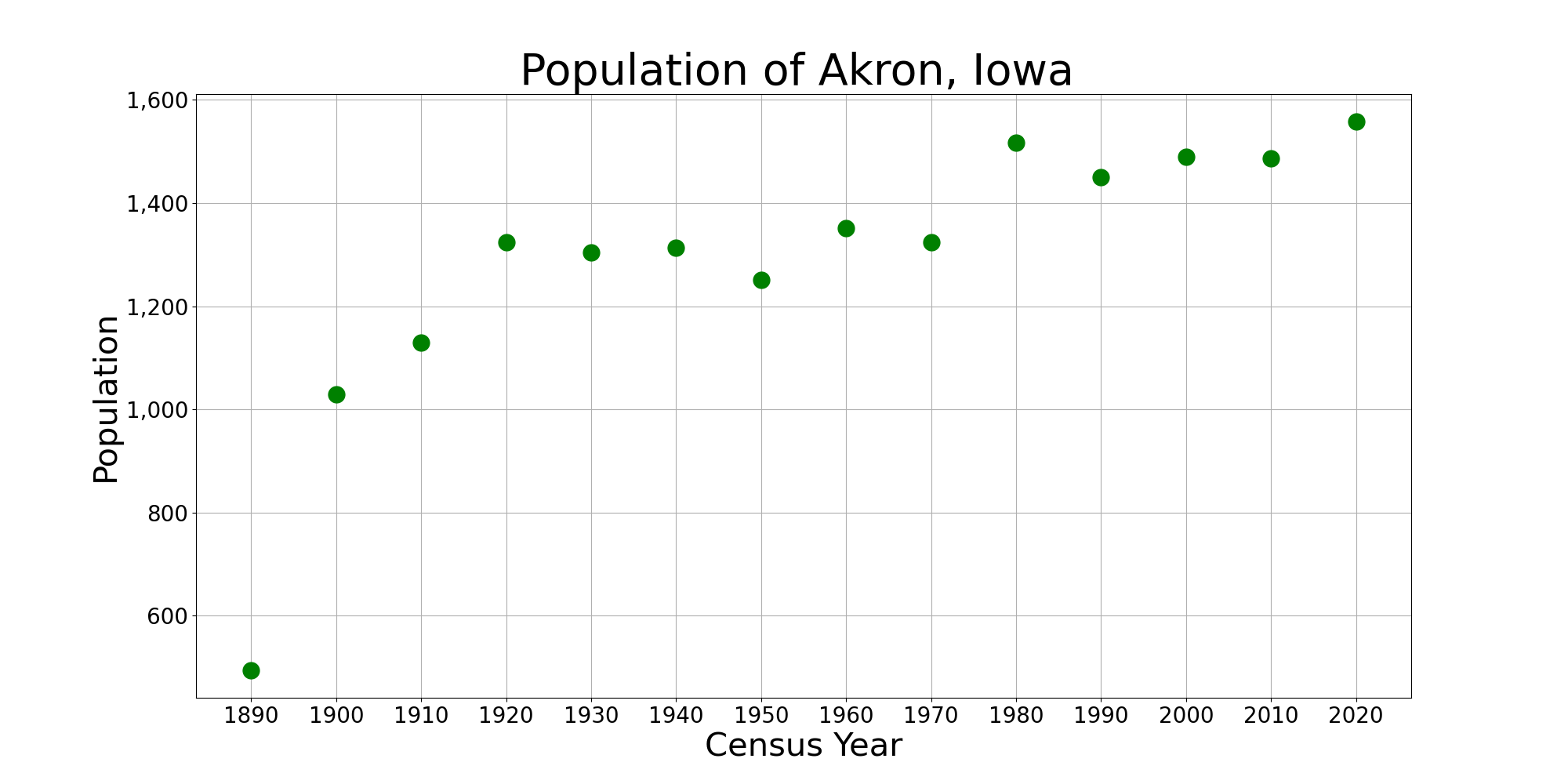
The population of Akron, Iowa from US census data

=== 2020 census ===
As of the 2020 census, Akron had a population of 1,558, with 661 households and 409 families residing in the city. The population density was 1,264.4 inhabitants per square mile (488.2/km^{2}). There were 704 housing units at an average density of 571.3 per square mile (220.6/km^{2}).

The median age in the city was 38.9 years. 28.0% of residents were under the age of 18. 30.0% of residents were under the age of 20; 4.2% were between the ages of 20 and 24; 23.2% were from 25 to 44; 21.6% were from 45 to 64; and 21.0% were 65 years of age or older. The gender makeup of the city was 47.9% male and 52.1% female. For every 100 females, there were 92.1 males, and for every 100 females age 18 and over, there were 94.6 males age 18 and over.

Of the 661 households, 31.6% had children under the age of 18 living with them. Of all households, 45.8% were married-couple households, 4.7% were cohabiting couple households, 27.5% were households with a female householder and no spouse or partner present, and 21.9% were households with a male householder and no spouse or partner present. 38.1% of all households were non-families, 35.2% were made up of individuals, and 19.9% had someone living alone who was 65 years of age or older.

Of all housing units, 6.1% were vacant. The homeowner vacancy rate was 0.8% and the rental vacancy rate was 7.1%. 0.0% of residents lived in urban areas, while 100.0% lived in rural areas.

Racial composition as of the 2020 census
Race	Number	Percent
White	1,453	93.3%
Black or African American	1	0.1%
American Indian and Alaska Native	11	0.7%
Asian	0	0.0%
Native Hawaiian and Other Pacific Islander	1	0.1%
Some other race	19	1.2%
Two or more races	73	4.7%
Hispanic or Latino (of any race)	64	4.1%

=== 2010 census ===
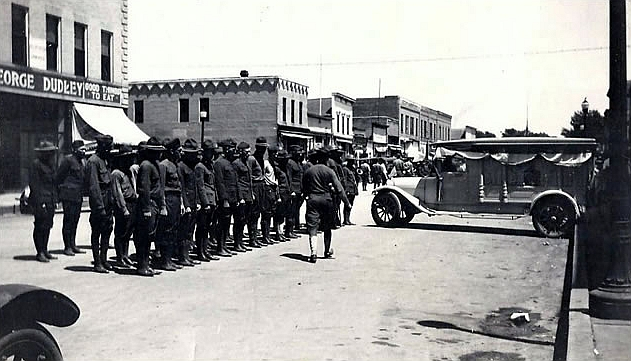
Akron honor guard in 1921 for Private Albert E. Hoschler, the first from Akron to enlist in the World War I, and the first from Akron killed in battle in France (on March 5, 1918).

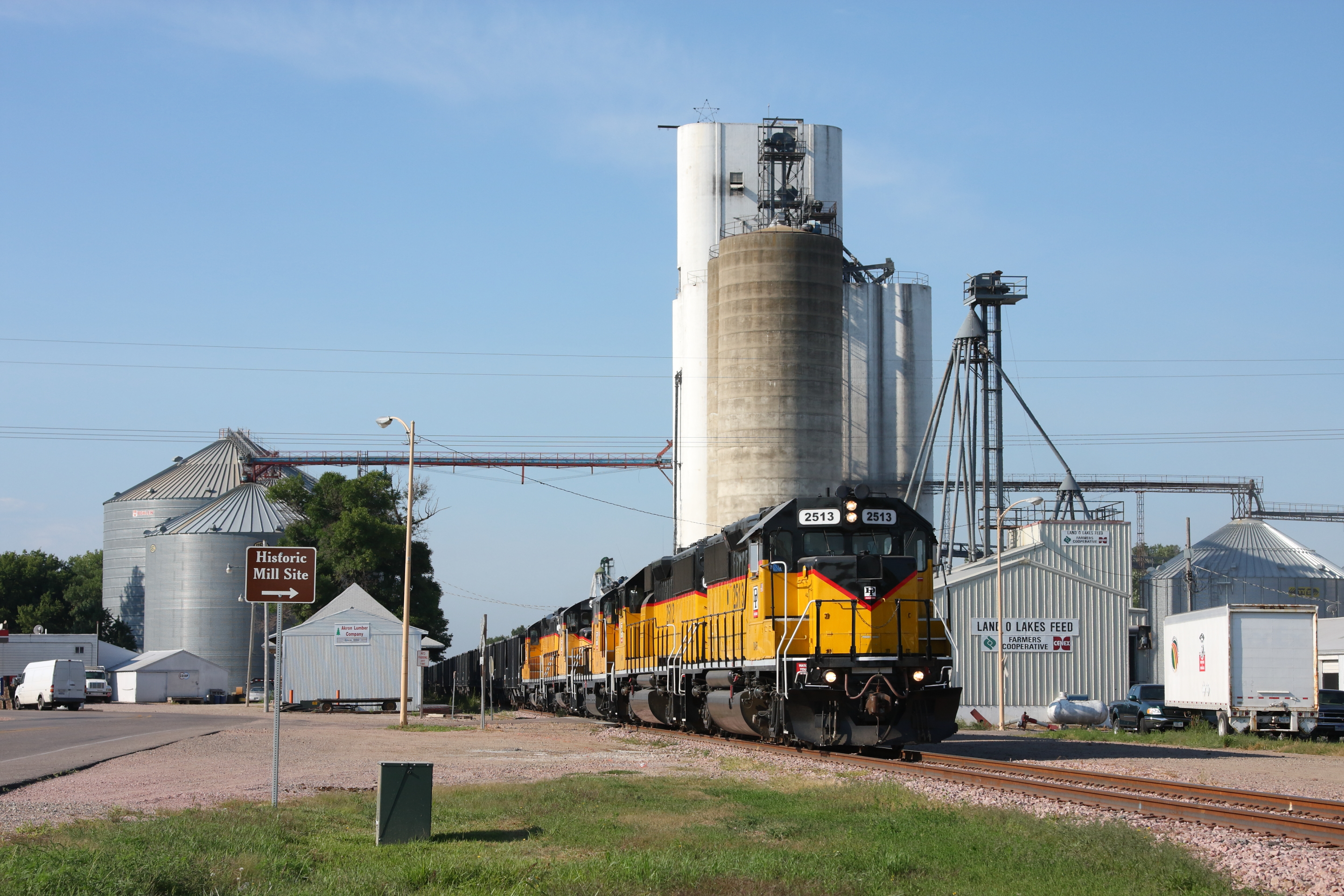
Train in Akron

As of the census of 2010, there were 1,486 people, 625 households, and 407 families living in the city. The population density was 1,218.0 inhabitants per square mile (470.3/km^{2}). There were 702 housing units at an average density of 575.4 per square mile (222.2/km^{2}). The racial makeup of the city was 97.4% White, 0.4% African American, 0.6% Native American, 0.1% Asian, 0.1% Pacific Islander, 0.5% from other races, and 0.9% from two or more races. Hispanic or Latino of any race were 0.5% of the population.

There were 625 households, of which 27.5% had children under the age of 18 living with them, 52.8% were married couples living together, 8.3% had a female householder with no husband present, 4.0% had a male householder with no wife present, and 34.9% were non-families. 32.5% of all households were made up of individuals, and 17.3% had someone living alone who was 65 years of age or older. The average household size was 2.32 and the average family size was 2.92.

The median age in the city was 42.1 years. 23.8% of residents were under the age of 18; 5.7% were between the ages of 18 and 24; 23.4% were from 25 to 44; 22.9% were from 45 to 64; and 24.4% were 65 years of age or older. The gender makeup of the city was 47.0% male and 53.0% female.

=== 2000 census ===
As of the census of 2000, there were 1,489 people, 667 households, and 424 families living in the city. The population density was 1,232.4 inhabitants per square mile (475.8/km^{2}). There were 707 housing units at an average density of 585.1 per square mile (225.9/km^{2}). The racial makeup of the city was 99.13% White, 0.34% African American, 0.07% Native American, and 0.47% from two or more races. Hispanic or Latino of any race were 0.27% of the population.

There were 667 households, out of which 27.7% had children under the age of 18 living with them, 53.2% were married couples living together, 7.5% had a female householder with no husband present, and 36.4% were non-families. 34.2% of all households were made up of individuals, and 20.8% had someone living alone who was 65 years of age or older. The average household size was 2.23 and the average family size was 2.85. 23.9% were under the age of 18, 6.8% from 18 to 24, 24.0% from 25 to 44, 20.0% from 45 to 64, and 25.3% were 65 years of age or older. The median age was 42 years. For every 100 females, there were 92.1 males. For every 100 females age 18 and over, there were 87.6 males.

The median income for a household in the city was $29,583, and the median income for a family was $37,404. Males had a median income of $30,875 versus $21,286 for females. The per capita income for the city was $18,631. About 6.2% of families and 7.2% of the population were below the poverty line, including 7.8% of those under age 18 and 11.0% of those age 65 or over.

== Education ==
Public education in the city is operated by Akron–Westfield Community School District, which includes Akron–Westfield Senior High School. The district formed on July 1, 1981, as a merger of the Akron and Westfield school districts.

== Notable people ==
- Alan J. Heeger, recipient of the 2000 Nobel Prize in Chemistry. Heeger grew up in Akron.
- J. Henry Lucken, representative to the Iowa General Assembly. Born in Akron.
- Frank J. Swanson, representative to the Iowa General Assembly from 1929 to 1931.
- Anna Johnson Pell Wheeler, mathematician. Moved to Akron at age nine.
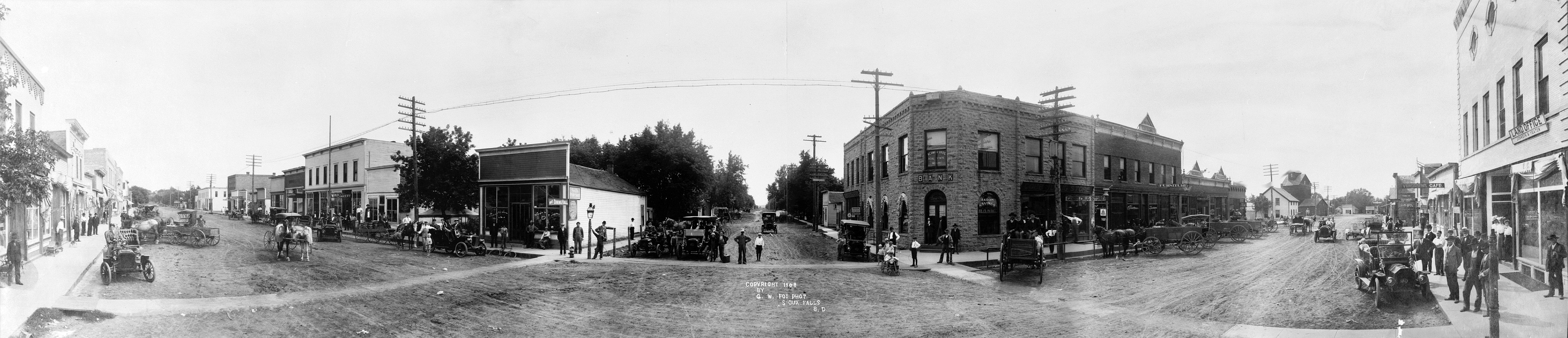
A view of Reed Street at Second Street in Akron, 1908

== See also ==
- List of cities in Iowa
