= Auzella Savage =

- Born: c. 1846; Anson, Maine, US
- Died: 1882 (aged 35–36); Lost at Sea
- Military career
- Allegiance: United States; Union
- Branch: United States Navy; Union Navy
- Rank: Ordinary Seaman
- Unit: USS Santiago de Cuba
- Conflicts: American Civil War • Second Battle of Fort Fisher
- Awards: Medal of Honor

Auzella Savage (c. 1846 – 1882) was a sailor in the U.S. Navy stationed aboard the USS Santiago de Cuba during the American Civil War. He received the Medal of Honor for his actions during the Second Battle of Fort Fisher on January 15, 1865.

== Military service ==
Savage volunteered for service in the U.S. Navy and was assigned to the Union brig USS Santiago de Cuba. His enlistment is credited to the state of Massachusetts.

On January 15, 1865, the North Carolina Confederate stronghold of Fort Fisher was taken by a combined Union storming party of sailors, marines, and soldiers under the command of Admiral David Dixon Porter and General Alfred Terry. Savage was a member of the storming party.

== Medal of Honor citation ==
The President of the United States of America, in the name of Congress, takes pleasure in presenting the Medal of Honor to Ordinary Seaman Auzella Savage, United States Navy, for extraordinary heroism in action while serving on board the U.S.S. Santiago de Cuba in the assault on Fort Fisher, North Carolina, 15 January 1865. When the landing party to which he was attached charged on the fort with a cheer, and the determination to plant the colors on the ramparts, Ordinary Seaman Savage remained steadfast when more than two-thirds of the marines and sailors fell back in panic during the fight. When enemy fire shot away the flagstaff above his hand, he bravely seized the remainder of the staff and brought his colors safely off.

General Orders: War Department, General Orders No. 59 (June 22, 1865)

Action Date: January 15, 1865

Service: Navy

Rank: Ordinary Seaman

Division: U.S.S. Santiago de Cuba

== See also ==
- List of Medal of Honor recipients
- List of American Civil War Medal of Honor recipients: Q–S
