= Frank J. Swanson =

American politician (1865–1941)

Member of the Iowa House of Representatives from the 80th district
- In office January 14, 1929 – January 11, 1931

Personal details
- Born: October 19, 1865 Stockaryd, Sweden
- Died: December 5, 1941 (aged 76) Akron, Iowa, U.S.
- Party: Republican
- Spouse: Betsey Johnson (m. 1890)
- Education: University of South Dakota
- Occupation: Politician, farmer, businessman

Frank J. Swanson (October 19, 1865 – December 5, 1941) was an American farmer, businessman, and politician.

Born in Stockaryd Jönköping County, Sweden, Swanson emigrated with parents to the United States and stayed in Chicago, Illinois for nine months. Swanson and his family settled on a farm in Union County, Dakota Territory. He studied at the University of South Dakota and then helped managed his father's farm. In 1901, Swanson moved to Akron, Iowa, where he was in the real estate business. Swanson was also in the banking, furniture and hardware business. He also owned a funeral home in Akron. He was also general manager of the Farmers' Grain Company in Akron. From 1918 to 1923, Swanson served on the Akron City Council. From 1929 to 1931, Swanson served in the Iowa House of Representatives. Swanson died in his home in Akron of a heart ailment.
