= Akron–Westfield Senior High School =

Public secondary school in Akron, Iowa, United States

Location
- 850 Kerr Drive; Akron, Iowa 51001; United States
- 42.832076°N 96.549698°W

Information
- Type: Public secondary
- Motto: High Expectations + Caring Environment = Responsible and Accountable Learners
- School district: Akron–Westfield Community School District
- Superintendent: Derek Briggs
- Principal: Derek Briggs
- Faculty: 18.09 (FTE)
- Grades: 9–12
- Enrollment: 192 (2022-23)
- Student to teacher ratio: 10.61
- Campus type: Rural
- Colors: Black and Red
- Athletics conference: War Eagle
- Mascot: Westerner
- Website: www.akron-westfield.com

Akron–Westfield Senior High School is a rural public high school within the Akron–Westfield Community School District in Akron, Iowa, United States. The area served by this school was officially merged from Akron and Westfield school districts in 1981. Their mascot is "The Westerner". Akron was a member of the Siouxland Conference from 1952 to 1975 before consolidation with Westfield, and then known as the Red Raiders. The school then joined the Little Sioux Conference, but left in 1979 to become a founding member of the War Eagle Conference.

== Athletics ==
The Westerners compete in the following sports in the War Eagle Conference:

- Cross Country
- Volleyball
- Football
  - 2002 Class 1A State Champions
- Basketball
- Wrestling
- Track and Field
- Golf
  - Girls' 2017 Class 1A State Champions
- Baseball
- Softball
  - 6-time State Champions (2005, 2006, 2010, 2011, 2013, 2014)

== See also ==
- List of high schools in Iowa
