= Swanton (surname) =

Swanton is an English surname. Notable people with this surname include the following:

- Cedric Howell Swanton (1899–1970), Australian psychiatrist
- Charles Swanton (born 1972), British oncologist
- Christine Swanton, New Zealand philosopher
- Dave Swanton, American football coach
- Diane Swanton (born 1979), South African sport shooter
- Ernest William Swanton (mycologist) (1870–1958), English mycologist, naturalist, antiquarian, and museum curator
- E. W. Swanton (1907–2000), British cricket writer
- Francis Swanton (c. 1605–1661), English politician and lawyer
- Fred Swanton (1862–1940), American politician and entrepreneur
- John R. Swanton (1873–1958), American anthropologist
- Lloyd Swanton (born 1960), Australian jazz musician and composer
- Louise Swanton Belloc (1796–1881), French writer
- Mary Hynes Swanton (1861–1940), Australian trade unionist
- Michael Swanton (born 1939), British polymath
- Robert Swanton (died 1765), Royal Navy officer
- William Swanton (c. 1630–1681), English politician
