= John Swanson (Medal of Honor) =

American Civil War Medal of Honor recipient

- Born: c. 1842; Sweden
- Died: 1923 (aged 80–81); Indiana, United States
- Burial place: Crown Hill Cemetery and Arboretum, Section 37, Lot 84, Indianapolis, Indiana, United States; 39.8224187°N 8.1778324°W
- Military career
- Allegiance: United States of America; Union
- Branch: United States Navy; Union Navy
- Rank: Seaman
- Unit: USS Santiago de Cuba (1861)
- Conflicts: American Civil War • Second Battle of Fort Fisher
- Awards: Medal of Honor

John Swanson (c. 1842 – June 13, 1923) was a sailor in the U.S. Navy during the American Civil War. He received the Medal of Honor for his actions during the Second Battle of Fort Fisher on January 15, 1865. His birth name was Jacob Johnson.

== Military service ==
Emigrating from his native Sweden, Swanson volunteered for service in the U.S. Navy and was assigned to the Union brig USS Santiago de Cuba (1861). His enlistment is credited to the state of Massachusetts.

On January 15, 1865, the North Carolina Confederate stronghold of Fort Fisher was taken by a combined Union storming party of sailors, marines, and soldiers under the command of Admiral David Dixon Porter and General Alfred Terry. Seaman Swanson was a member of the storming party.

== Medal of Honor citation ==
The President of the United States of America, in the name of Congress, takes pleasure in presenting the Medal of Honor to Seaman John Swanson, United States Navy, for extraordinary heroism in action while serving on board the U.S.S. Santiago de Cuba during the assault on Fort Fisher, North Carolina, on 15 January 1865. As one of a boat crew detailed to one of the generals on shore, Seaman Swanson bravely entered the fort in the assault and accompanied his party in carrying dispatches at the height of the battle. He was one of six men who entered the fort in the assault from the fleet.

General Orders: War Department, General Orders No. 59 (June 22, 1865)

Action Date: January 15, 1865

Service: Navy

Rank: Seaman

Division: U.S.S. Santiago de Cuba

== See also ==
- List of Medal of Honor recipients
- List of American Civil War Medal of Honor recipients: Q–S
- List of Medal of Honor recipients for the Second Battle of Fort Fisher
