= Christine Swanton =

New Zealand philosopher

- Born: 1947 (age 78–79)
- Awards: Rhodes Scholarship (1970)

Education
- Education: University of Oxford (PhD, 1970)

Philosophical work
- Era: 21st-century philosophy
- Region: Western philosophy
- Institutions: University of Auckland
- Main interests: ethics

Christine Swanton is a New Zealand philosopher and Retired Honorary Research Fellow at the University of Auckland. She is known for her works on virtue ethics.

== Books ==
- Freedom: A Coherence Theory, Hackett, 1992
- Virtue Ethics: A Pluralistic View, Oxford University Press, 2003
- The Virtue Ethics of Hume and Nietzsche, Wiley Blackwell, 2015
- Target Centred Virtue Ethics, Oxford University Press, 2021
- Love and Its Place in Virtue, Oxford University Press, 2024
- Perspectives in Role Ethics: Virtues, Reasons, and Obligation, edited with Tim Dare, Routledge, 2020
