= Jon E. Swanson =

American helicopter pilot (1942–1971)

Jon Edward Swanson
- Captain Jon Swanson
- Born: May 1, 1942; San Antonio, Texas, US
- Died: February 26, 1971 (aged 28); Cambodia
- Burial place: Arlington National Cemetery
- Military career
- Allegiance: United States
- Branch: United States Army
- Service years: 1965–1971
- Rank: Captain United States Army
- Units: 1st Battalion, 9th Cavalry Regiment
- Conflicts: Vietnam War †
- Awards: Medal of Honor; 2 Distinguished Flying Crosses; 2 Purple Hearts

Jon Edward Swanson (May 1, 1942 – February 26, 1971) was a United States Army helicopter pilot during the Vietnam War. He directed the destruction of five enemy bunkers and two anti-aircraft positions before being shot down in Cambodia. His actions were recognized over 30 years later, when his family received the Medal of Honor posthumously from President George W. Bush in 2002.

== Biography ==
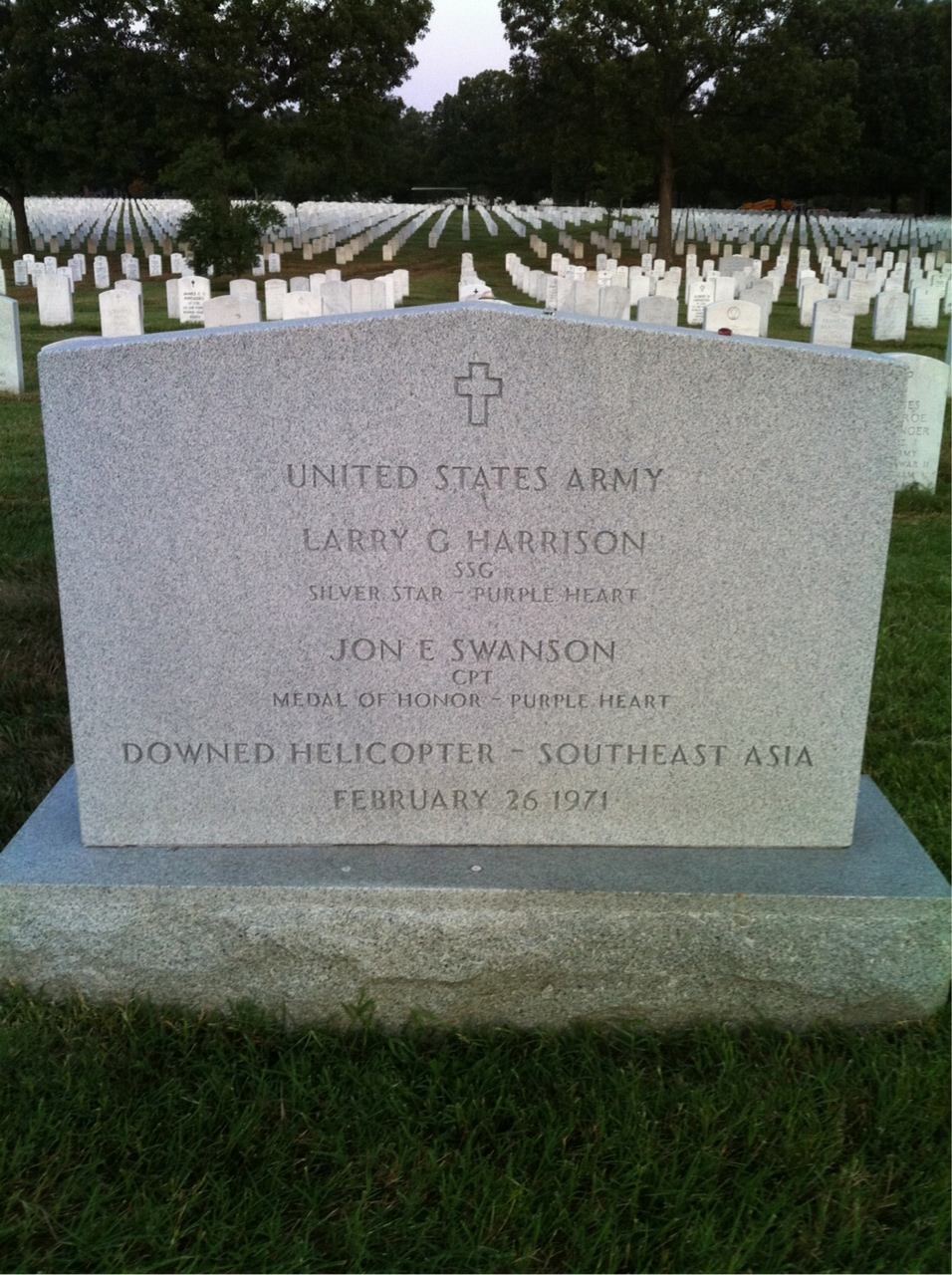
Grave of Swanson and Harrison at Arlington National Cemetery

Born in 1942, Swanson grew up in Denver, Colorado. He met his future wife Sandee there as a teenager. Swanson attended Colorado State University where he was a member of the Army's Reserve Officers' Training Corps. After graduating in 1965 and becoming a commissioned officer in the Army, he continued to correspond with Sandee, who was serving with the Peace Corps in the Philippines. The two were married in 1967 in Honolulu, Hawaii, while Swanson was on leave from his first tour in South Vietnam. They settled in Boulder, Colorado, and had two daughters, Brigid and Holly.

Swanson later volunteered for a second combat tour in Southeast Asia. Now a captain, he served as an OH-6A "Loach" helicopter pilot. On February 26, 1971, he and his observer, Staff Sgt. Larry Harrison, were on a reconnaissance mission over Cambodia, searching for enemy positions in support of an Army of the Republic of Vietnam (ARVN) task force. When the task force came under heavy fire, Swanson engaged and destroyed five enemy bunkers despite intense anti-aircraft fire. He then helped destroy two machine gun positions and, although his craft had been severely damaged and was running low on ammunition, volunteered to continue the mission. While heading towards a third machine gun position, the helicopter exploded and crashed to the ground, killing both men inside.

Swanson and Harrison were listed as "killed in action – body not recovered." In 1992, a search team located the crash site and found small amounts of human remains. More remains were recovered in 1999 and, in late 2001, were identified as Swanson and Harrison.

Swanson's widow, Sandee, and his younger brother, Tom, were married in 1977. Tom Swanson adopted his brother's two daughters. As adults, the daughters learned that Jon Swanson had been recommended for the Medal of Honor shortly after his death. His original nomination had been rejected, and he was instead given the military's second-highest award, the Distinguished Service Cross. In 1998 his daughters began an effort to have the nomination re-assessed. A subsequent investigation concluded that Swanson's Distinguished Service Cross should be upgraded. He was awarded the Medal of Honor on May 1, 2002, 30 years after the mission in Cambodia. During a ceremony at the White House Rose Garden that day, Swanson's widow and daughters accepted the medal on his behalf from President George W. Bush. World War II soldier Ben L. Salomon was also honored at the ceremony. Two days later, on May 3, Swanson and Harrison were buried together at Arlington National Cemetery.

== Medal of Honor citation ==
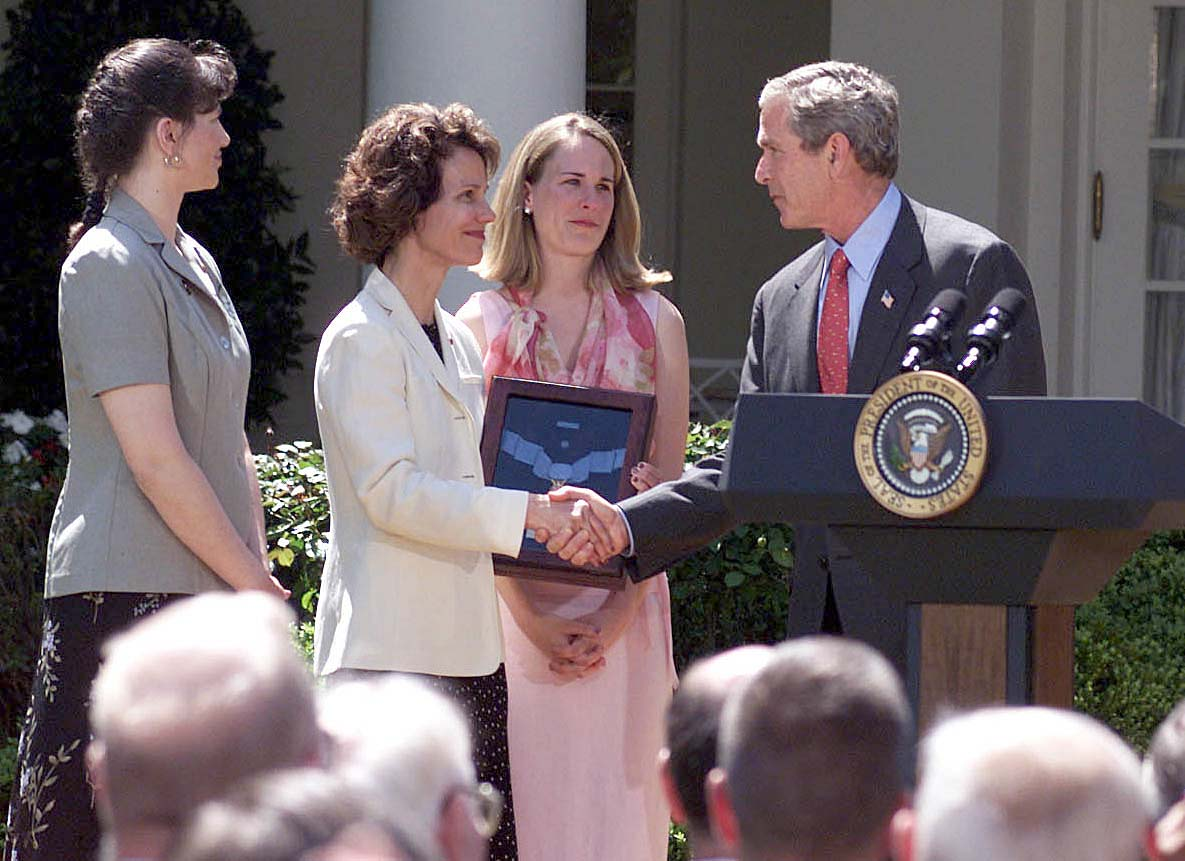
During Swanson's Medal of Honor ceremony, his widow Sandee Swanson shakes hands with President Bush as her daughters Brigid Swanson Jones and Holly Walker look on.

CAPTAIN JON E. SWANSON
UNITED STATES ARMY

For conspicuous gallantry and intrepidity at the risk of his life above and beyond the call of duty:

Captain Jon E. Swanson distinguished himself by acts of bravery on February 26, 1971, while flying an OH-6A aircraft in support of ARVN Task Force 333 in the Kingdom of Cambodia. With two well-equipped enemy regiments known to be in the area, Captain Swanson was tasked with pinpointing the enemy's precise positions. Captain Swanson flew at treetop level at a slow airspeed, making his aircraft a vulnerable target. The advancing ARVN unit came under heavy automatic weapons fire from enemy bunkers 100 meters to their front. Exposing his aircraft to enemy anti-aircraft fire, Captain Swanson immediately engaged the enemy bunkers with concussion grenades and machine gun fire. After destroying five bunkers and evading intense ground-to-air fire, he observed a .51 caliber machine gun position. With all his heavy ordnance expended on the bunkers, he did not have sufficient explosives to destroy the position. Consequently, he marked the position with a smoke grenade and directed a Cobra gun ship attack. After completion of the attack, Captain Swanson found the weapon still intact and an enemy soldier crawling over to man it. He immediately engaged the individual and killed him. During this time, his aircraft sustained several hits from another .51 caliber machine gun. Captain Swanson engaged the position with his aircraft's weapons, marked the target, and directed a second Cobra gun ship attack. He volunteered to continue the mission, despite the fact that he was now critically low on ammunition and his aircraft was crippled by enemy fire. As Captain Swanson attempted to fly toward another .51 caliber machine gun position, his aircraft exploded in the air and crashed to the ground, causing his death. Captain Swanson's courageous actions resulted in at least eight enemy killed and the destruction of three enemy anti-aircraft weapons. Captain Swanson's extraordinary heroism and devotion to duty are in keeping with the highest traditions of military service and reflect great credit upon himself, his unit, and the United States Army.

== In memory ==
Swanson's name is inscribed on the Vietnam Veterans Memorial ("The Wall") on Panel 04W, Row 007.

== See also ==
- List of Medal of Honor recipients for the Vietnam War
