= Bill Swanson (baseball) =

American baseball player (1888–1954)

- Infielder
- Born: October 12, 1888; New York, New York
- Died: October 14, 1954 (aged 66); New York, New York
- Batted: Both Threw: Right

MLB debut
- September 2, 1914, for the Boston Red Sox

Last MLB appearance
- October 7, 1914, for the Boston Red Sox

MLB statistics
- Batting average: .200
- Home runs: 0
- RBI: 0

Teams
- Boston Red Sox (1914)

William Andrew Swanson (October 12, 1888 – October 14, 1954) was an infielder in Major League Baseball. Listed at 5 ft 6 in (1.68 m), 156 lb., Swanson batted and threw right-handed. He was born in New York, New York.

Swanson played briefly for the 1914 Boston Red Sox as a reserve infielder for Steve Yerkes (2B), Larry Gardner (3B) and Everett Scott (SS). He went 4-for-20 for a .200 batting average in 11 games, including two doubles and a .304 on-base percentage, and never appeared in a major league game again.

Swanson died in his hometown of New York, just two days after his 66th birthday.
