= John August Swanson =

American artist (1938–2021)

- Born: January 11, 1938; Los Angeles, California
- Died: September 23, 2021 (aged 83); Los Angeles, California

John August Swanson (January 11, 1938 – September 23, 2021) was an American visual artist who worked primarily in the medium of serigraphy, as well as oil, watercolor, acrylic, mixed media, lithography, and etching.

Swanson studied with Corita Kent at Immaculate Heart College. He was the recipient of a Doctor of Humane Letters degree honoris causa from California Lutheran University. He collaborated on a number of books.

== Work ==
Festival of Lights

The son of a Mexican mother and a Swedish father, Swanson's art reflects the strong narrative influences of his cultural upbringing. His works frequently depict scenes of community life, as in "Festival of Lights" (2000), "Tales of Hoffman" (2001), and "Psalm 85" (2003) after Psalm 85. Swanson's images are optimistic and colorful, with a strongly humanistic feel.

Swanson was perhaps best known for his biblical imagery. Combining the flat, stylized look of iconography with the bright palette and strong narrative sense of his background in Latin American folk art, pieces such as "Daniel" (2000), "Good Samaritan" (2002), and "Washing of the Feet" have proven popular among collectors of religious artwork around the world.

== Exhibitions ==
Swanson's work is represented in the permanent collections of many museums, including three museums of the Smithsonian Institution: The National Museum of American History, The Smithsonian American Art Museum and The National Air and Space Museum. He is also included in the print collections of the Art Institute of Chicago, Harvard University's Fogg Museum, the Tate Gallery and Victoria and Albert Museum in London, and the Bibliothèque Nationale in Paris. His painting "The Procession" is one of relatively few works by contemporary artists to be selected for the Vatican Museums' Collection of Modern Religious Art. With holdings of 150 pieces, Candler School of Theology at Emory University in Atlanta has acquired the largest collection of Swanson’s work.
