= Iowa Highway 31 =

State highway in Iowa, United States

Iowa Highway 31
- Iowa 31 highlighted in red

Route information
- Maintained by Iowa DOT
- Length: 38.856 mi (62.533 km)

Major junctions
- South end: Iowa 141 / CR L12 at Smithland
- US 20 at Correctionville
- North end: US 59 / CR C63 near Quimby

Location
- Country: United States
- State: Iowa
- Counties: Woodbury; Ida; Cherokee

Highway system
- Iowa Primary Highway System; Interstate; US; State; Secondary; Scenic
| ← US 30 | → Iowa 32 |

Iowa Highway 31 (Iowa 31) is a diagonal state highway which runs from Iowa Highway 141 (Iowa 141) in Smithland to U.S. Highway 59 (US 59) east of Quimby. For most of its length, the highway runs parallel to the Little Sioux River. Since its designation, the route has changed very little. The route was paved by the mid-1960s.

== Route description ==
Iowa Highway 31 begins at an intersection with Iowa Highway 141, Main Street in Smithland. The route heads north along Hickory Street and out of town parallel to the western bank of the Little Sioux River. It heads to the north-northeast for 20 miles (32 km) through the Woodbury County communities of Oto and Anthon, and crosses the Little Sioux southwest of Correctionville.

At Correctionville, Iowa 31 intersects U.S. Highway 20 and then curves around following the eastern bank of the Little Sioux. The route continues north-northeast, clipping the northwestern corner of Ida County, before entering Cherokee County south of Washta. At Quimby, the route turns east and travels 4 miles (6.4 km) to its northern end at U.S. Highway 59.

== History ==
From its designation, Iowa 31 has run from Smithland to Quimby on a road which runs parallel to the Little Sioux River. In 1926, the route continued along the Little Sioux, ending at Primary Road No. 21, now U.S. Highway 59. By 1947, US 59 was straightened, and Iowa 31 followed the former alignment of US 59 to end at the straighter road. By 1952, Iowa 31 had moved onto its current alignment, where it remains to this day. By 1966, the highway was paved in its entirety.

== Major intersections ==
| County | Location | mi | km | Destinations | Notes |
|---|---|---|---|---|---|
| Woodbury | Smithland | 0.000 | 0.000 | Iowa 141 (Main Street) / CR L12 (S. Hickory Street) – Mapleton, Sloan | |
| Woodbury | Correctionville | 20.721 | 33.347 | US 20 west – Holstein | Southern end of US 20 overlap |
| Woodbury | Correctionville | 20.975 | 33.756 | US 20 east (11th Street) – Moville | Northern end of US 20 overlap |
| Ida | No major junctions | | | | |
| Cherokee | Silver Township | 38.856 | 62.533 | US 59 / CR C63 east – Cherokee, Holstein, Storm Lake | |
1.000 mi = 1.609 km; 1.000 km = 0.621 mi: Concurrency terminus
