= Mary Hill, Iowa =

- Unincorporated community
- Location within Iowa
- Coordinates: 42°44′08″N 95°41′19″W
- Country: United States
- State: Iowa
- County: Cherokee
- Elevation: 1,381 ft (421 m)
- Time zone: UTC-6 (Central (CST))
  - Summer (DST): UTC-5 (CDT)
- Area code: 712
- GNIS feature ID: 464644

Mary Hill is an unincorporated community in Rock and Sheridan townships, Cherokee County, Iowa, United States. Mary Hill is located along County Highway L48, 7 miles (11 km) west of Cherokee.
