= Willow Township, Cherokee County, Iowa =

Township in Iowa, US

Willow Township
- Township
- Coordinates: 42°36′07″N 095°40′44″W
- Country: United States
- State: Iowa
- County: Cherokee

Area
  - Total: 36.30 sq mi (94.02 km^{2})
  - Land: 36.26 sq mi (93.91 km^{2})
  - Water: 0.042 sq mi (0.11 km^{2})
- Elevation: 1,175 ft (358 m)

Population (2000)
  - Total: 845
  - Density: 23/sq mi (9/km^{2})
- FIPS code: 19-94740
- GNIS feature ID: 0469002

Willow Township is one of sixteen townships in Cherokee County, Iowa, United States. As of the 2000 census, its population was 845.

== Geography ==
Willow Township covers an area of 36.3 square miles (94 km^{2}) and contains two incorporated settlements: Quimby and Washta. According to the USGS, it contains two cemeteries: Grandview and Sunset View.
