= Remsen Union Community School District =

School district in Iowa

Coordinates: 42.809180°N 95.965039°W

Location
- Remsen, Iowa Plymouth County and Sioux County United States
- Coordinates: 42.809180, -95.965039

District information
- Type: Local school district
- Grades: K-12
- Superintendent: Dan Barkel
- Schools: 2
- Budget: $5,516,000 (2020-21)
- NCES District ID: 1924120

Students and staff
- Students: 310 (2022-23)
- Teachers: 27.38 FTE
- Staff: 31.05 FTE
- Student–teacher ratio: 11.32
- Athletic conference: War Eagle
- District mascot: Royals
- Colors: Blue and White

Other information
- Website: www.mmcruroyals.org

Remsen Union Community School District is a rural public school district headquartered in Remsen, Iowa. The district is mostly in Plymouth County with a portion in Sioux County.

The district under the name, "MMCRU Schools", operates an elementary and middle school in Remsen, while the Marcus-Meriden-Cleghorn Community School District operates an elementary school and a high school in Marcus.

== History ==
Circa 2014, the MMC and RU districts began negotiating over a grade-sharing agreement, but the talks ended in 2014 by mutual agreement. The two districts prepared for budget cuts. Greg Forbes of the Sioux City Journal wrote that "Residents of both districts have lobbied to keep their respective high schools." The two districts reached out to other potential grade-sharing parties in the meantime. By June 2015 the MMC and RU districts resumed talks, and the districts ultimately reached an agreement regarding the grade sharing.

In 2016, the districts began grade-sharing, and the two together operate under the name "MMCRU Schools". The "royals" were the chosen mascot. As part of the arrangement, both districts have their own elementary schools, with RU having a combined middle school and MMC with the combined high school. Breeanna Pearce of the Le Mars Daily Sentinel wrote that "nitially, the program met with some harsh criticism", and that there were fewer administrators, but that due to a successfully merging of operations, "MMCRU continues to gather support." The MMCRU is not yet legally a district.
