= Sheridan Township, Cherokee County, Iowa =

Township in Iowa, US

Sheridan Township
- Township
- Coordinates: 42°47′10″N 095°41′28″W
- Country: United States
- State: Iowa
- County: Cherokee

Area
  - Total: 36.4 sq mi (94.2 km^{2})
  - Land: 36.4 sq mi (94.2 km^{2})
  - Water: 0 sq mi (0 km^{2})
- Elevation: 1,440 ft (440 m)

Population (2000)
  - Total: 716
  - Density: 20/sq mi (7.6/km^{2})
- FIPS code: 19-93843
- GNIS feature ID: 0468692

Sheridan Township is one of sixteen townships in Cherokee County, Iowa, United States. As of the 2000 census, its population was 716.

== Geography ==
Sheridan Township covers an area of 36.37 square miles (94.2 km^{2}) and contains two incorporated settlements: Cleghorn and Meriden. According to the USGS, it contains two cemeteries: Mary Hill and Meriden.
