= Kelvindale =

District of Glasgow, Scotland

Coordinates: 55.889718°N 4.310464°W

Kelvindale: Scottish Gaelic: Dail Chealbhainn
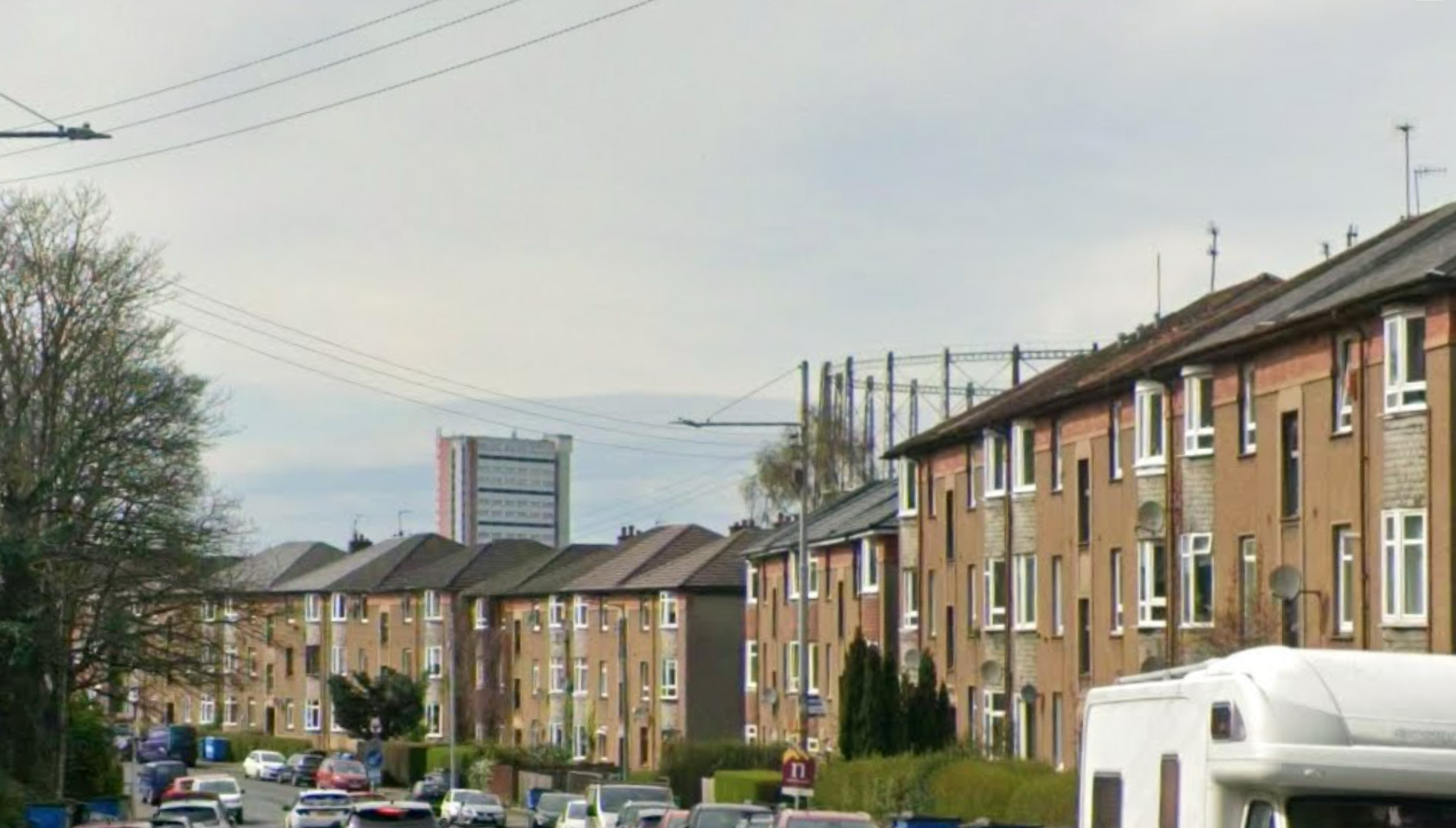

- Location within Glasgow
- OS grid reference: NS556687
- Council area: Glasgow City Council
- Lieutenancy area: Glasgow
- Country: Scotland
- Sovereign state: United Kingdom
- Post town: GLASGOW
- Postcode district: G12
- Dialling code: 0141
- Police: Scotland
- Fire: Scottish
- Ambulance: Scottish
- UK Parliament: Glasgow North
- Scottish Parliament: Glasgow Kelvin and Maryhill

Kelvindale (Scottish Gaelic: Dail Chealbhainn) is a district in the West End of the city of Glasgow, Scotland. Kelvindale shares the G12 postcode with the neighbouring residential districts of Kelvinside, Hillhead, Hyndland, Dowanhill and, as well as Gartnavel General Hospital, Glasgow Clyde College (Anniesland) and the University of Glasgow, and is also close to the Anniesland and Wyndford areas of the city. The area is characterised by traditional interwar housing, formed of tenements and semi-detached houses.

== Construction ==
Before the 1920s, Kelvindale was grassland, with a cricket ground owned by the University of Glasgow. After World War One, the land started to be used for housing, which Glasgow needed. Construction started in the late 1920s, with work undertaken by the City Corporation. This was followed up in the early 1930s by the Glasgow-based housebuilding company Mactaggart & Mickel. The houses were intended for rent rather than for sale; they consisted of semi-detached villas. Some of these houses were set aside for rent by Glasgow Corporation. The Corporation extended the building down Kelvindale Road towards Collins Paper Mill. In the 1930s the Western Heritable Investment Company then extended the district considerably by extending the range of pre-war tenements in Dorchester Avenue, Ripon Drive, etc. between 1934 and 1938. Unusually, these tenements are built on concrete rafts due to the heavy mine workings in the district from the Garscube Estate. They were planned as four-storey, but due to Scots law they were reduced to three storeys.

Kelvindale from above

The district is dominated by the Temple gas holders (erected in 1891, now decommissioned and Category B listed in 2018) which were reputed to be the biggest in the United Kingdom. During the Second World War the Royal Air Force stationed a balloon unit on what is now ex-MoD housing on Dorchester Avenue. The large fields were once used for grazing horses and cattle but are now the site of more tenement building and the Kelvindale Primary School. Gibson Hall, a former Glasgow Caledonian University hall of residence which stood on Dorchester Avenue, was recently demolished to make way for a new build. Flanders House, built for World War One soldiers, was demolished in 2006 and has been replaced by a modern construction.

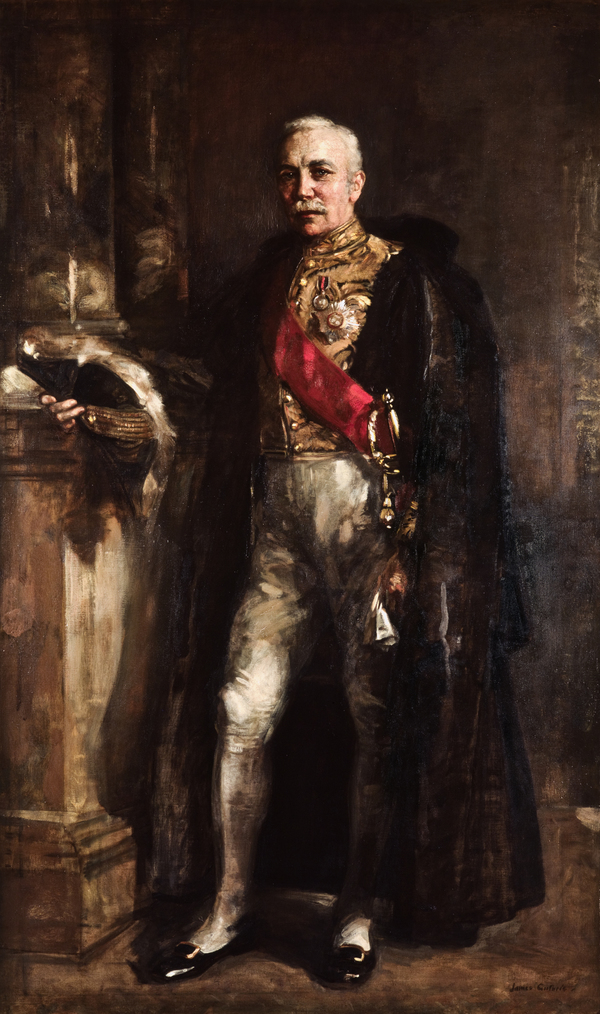

Many of the street names in the area are taken from places in England: these include Dorchester, Hertford and Leicester Avenues, Colchester, Chelmsford, Manchester, Kendal, Penrith, Northampton, Ripon, Southampton, Weymouth and Winchester Drives, and Beaconsfield Road. A few are named after Scottish places, including Grandtully Drive and Fortingall Avenue.

In the early 2000s, Kelvindale remained a desirable family area near the city's West End. In 2007, Bryant Homes controversially removed a large number of trees from a local lane to provide better access to a new housing development. The actor Robert Carlyle was among those who protested against the felling. In July 2009, a suspected arson attack caused considerable damage to the site. One partially constructed four-storey housing block burnt to the ground and the only occupied building on the site was evacuated.

== Transport ==
Kelvindale railway station was opened on 26 September 2005. It is situated on the line from Glasgow Queen Street (High Level) to Anniesland, an extension of the Maryhill Line.

Several bus routes including the frequent 6 and 6A services operate along the nearby A82 road Great Western Road. While the 94 service operates both ways along Kelvindale Road - Cleveden Road along Dorchester Avenue and Gt Western Road via the nearby Wyndford Estate to and from Knightswood/Anniesland Cross. The M4 service operates both ways along Dorchester Avenue and Cleveden Road to Partick Bus Station.

The Kelvin Cycle Way which links into the Forth and Clyde Canal cycle path runs through the area.

== Education ==
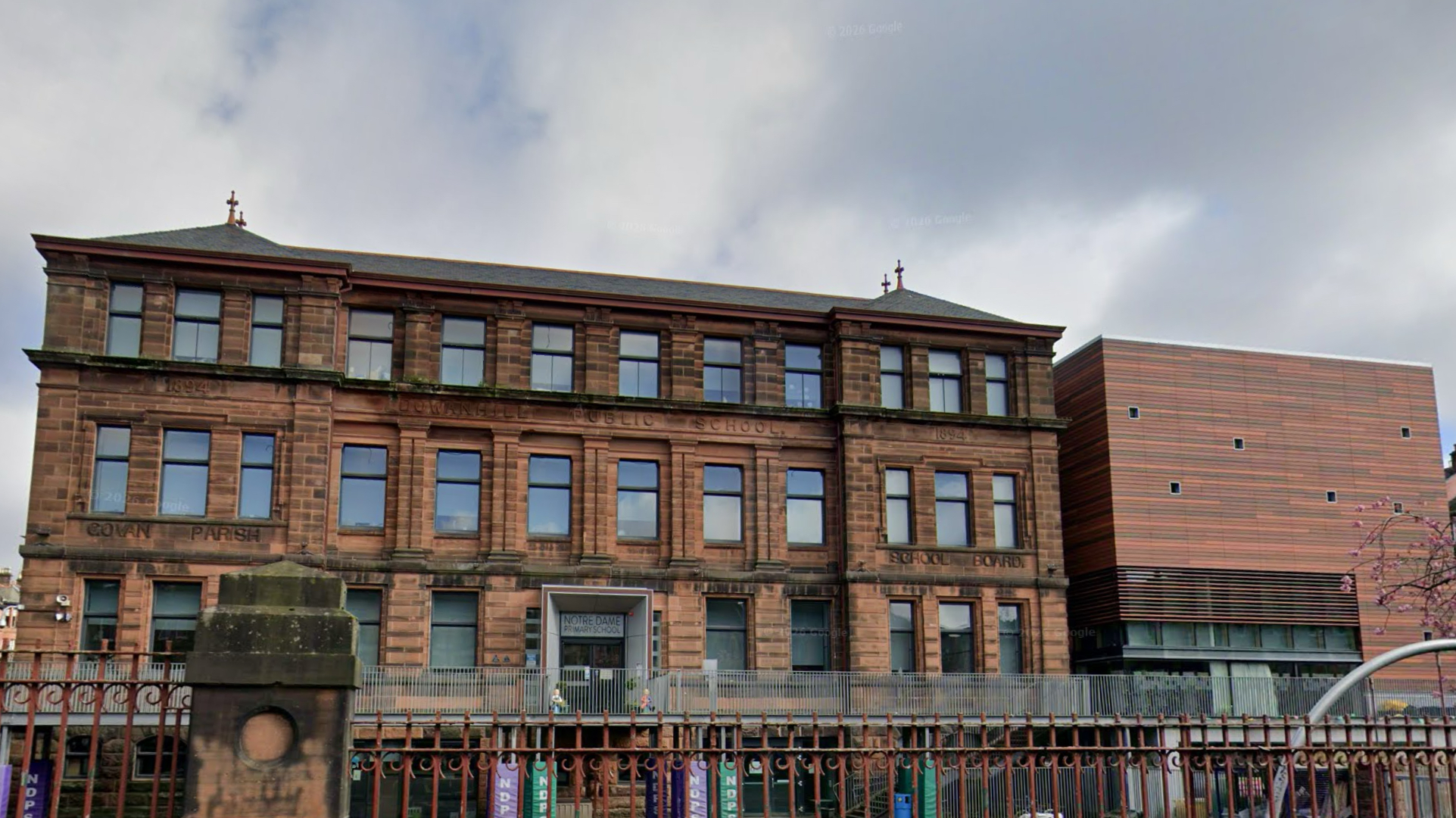
Notre dame primary school

Kelvindale Primary School is a non-denominational state primary school located in Kelvindale. The increasing number of residents in the 1920s led to the desire for a local primary school, as children had to travel to Hyndland Primary School (located on the present day site of Hyndland Secondary School) in the neighbouring district of Hyndland. After the Second World War, an annexe of Hyndland Primary School was built in Kelvindale (within the present day grounds of Cleveden Secondary School). The two concrete huts are thought to have catered for the first three years of primary school education. In 1963, Kelvindale Primary School was built. The original school consisted of one building with eight classrooms; it opened its doors on 24 August 1964 with a roll of 248 pupils. Over the years, the school roll increased, requiring an annexe of two classrooms to be built in 1971. Another addition came in 1977, when a building specifically to house the infants was opened. The football pitch was sold to build flats, and a new AstroTurf pitch was laid, opening in late 2006. More education opportunities arose when Notre Dame primary school allowed children other than Roman Catholics. There is now competition between the Hyndland, Notre Dame and Kelvindale primary schools

== Notable buildings ==
Kelvindale contains St. John's Renfield Church (the local Church of Scotland parish church), Glasgow Nuffield Hospital, Cleveden Secondary School and Kelvindale Primary School.

In recent years, at Cleveden Secondary School and Kelvindale Primary School, the ash football pitches have been sold and replaced by new astroturf pitches.

Historic images of the Kelvindale area can be found on the Virtual Mitchell website.

== Local healthcare ==
Most residents go to the Queen Elizabeth University Hospital or Gartnavel Hospital. Nearby is also the old Royal Lunatic Asylum.

== Notable people ==
Notable people include Henry Campbell-Bannerman (by birth), Greg Hemphill (resident), Ford Kiernan (resident), Mary Hill, the namesake of Maryhill (resident), and Eddie McConnell.

== Political representation ==
Kelvindale is part of:

- Glasgow Anniesland (Scottish Parliament constituency)
- Glasgow North (Westminster constituency)
- The Partick East/Kelvindale ward of Glasgow City Council
