= Marcus Township, Cherokee County, Iowa =

Township in Iowa, US

Marcus Township
- Township
- Coordinates: 42°51′53″N 095°47′38″W
- Country: United States
- State: Iowa
- County: Cherokee

Area
  - Total: 36.59 sq mi (94.77 km^{2})
  - Land: 36.59 sq mi (94.77 km^{2})
  - Water: 0 sq mi (0 km^{2})
- Elevation: 1,450 ft (442 m)

Population (2000)
  - Total: 1,311
  - Density: 36/sq mi (13.8/km^{2})
- FIPS code: 19-92829
- GNIS feature ID: 0468345

Marcus Township is one of sixteen townships in Cherokee County, Iowa, United States. As of the 2000 census, its population was 1,311.

== Geography ==
Marcus Township covers an area of 36.59 square miles (94.8 km^{2}) and contains one incorporated settlement, Marcus. According to the USGS, it contains two cemeteries: Holy Name and Marcus-Amherst.
