= Grand Meadow Township, Cherokee County, Iowa =

Township in Iowa, US

Grand Meadow Township
- Township
- Coordinates: 42°36′22″N 095°47′46″W
- Country: United States
- State: Iowa
- County: Cherokee

Area
  - Total: 36.42 sq mi (94.34 km^{2})
  - Land: 36.39 sq mi (94.26 km^{2})
  - Water: 0.027 sq mi (0.07 km^{2})
- Elevation: 1,350 ft (410 m)

Population (2020 census)
  - Total: 160
  - Density: 4.4/sq mi (1.7/km^{2})
- FIPS code: 19-91602
- GNIS feature ID: 0467921

Grand Meadow Township is one of sixteen townships in Cherokee County, Iowa, United States. As of the 2020 census, its population was 160.

== Geography ==
Grand Meadow Township covers an area of 36.42 square miles (94.3 km^{2}) and contains no incorporated settlements. According to the USGS, it contains one cemetery, Grand Meadow.
