= Maryhill (disambiguation) =

Maryhill is a district of Glasgow, Scotland.

Maryhill may also refer to:

- Maryhill (ward), a ward of Glasgow City Council

== Places ==
- Maryhill, Ontario, unincorporated community, Canada
- Maryhill, New Zealand, suburb of Dunedin
- Maryhill, Washington, census-designated place, United States
- Maryhill Estates, Kentucky, city, United States

== Organizations and institutions ==
- Maryhill F.C., a football club in Maryhill, Glasgow, Scotland, United Kingdom
- Maryhill Museum of Art, a registered historic place and museum in Maryhill, Washington, United States
- Maryhill College, in Lucena City, Philippines

== See also ==
- Mary Hill (disambiguation)
