= Marcus-Meriden-Cleghorn Community School District =

Public school district in Marcus, Iowa, United States

Coordinates: 41.662855°N 92.018800°W

Location
- Marcus, Iowa Cherokee County and Plymouth County United States
- Coordinates: 41.662855, -92.018800

District information
- Type: Local school district
- Grades: K-12
- Superintendent: Dan Barkel
- Schools: 2
- Budget: $7,358,000 (2020-21)
- NCES District ID: 1918630

Students and staff
- Students: 386 (2022-23)
- Teachers: 39.32 FTE
- Staff: 38.27 FTE
- Student–teacher ratio: 9.82
- Athletic conference: War Eagle
- District mascot: Royals
- Colors: Blue and White

Other information
- Website: www.mmcruroyals.org

Marcus-Meriden-Cleghorn Community School District (MMC) is a rural public school district headquartered in Marcus, Iowa. The district under the name, "MMCRU Schools", operates an elementary and high school in Marcus, while the Remsen Union Community School District operates an elementary school and a middle school in Remsen.

Marcus-Meriden-Cleghorn is mostly in Cherokee County with a portion in Plymouth County. It serves Marcus, Meriden, and Cleghorn.

== History ==
The district formed on July 1, 1993, as a result of the merger of the Marcus and Meriden-Cleghorn school districts.

The district inherited the Cleghorn School, which first opened in 1920. By 2015 the school had 90 students in grades 4–6. In 2015 the district voted to close the school in order to have a yearly savings of $130,000. Students were redirected to Marcus.

Circa 2014, the MMC and RU districts began negotiating over a grade-sharing agreement, but the talks ended in 2014 by mutual agreement. The two districts prepared for budget cuts. Greg Forbes of the Sioux City Journal wrote that "Residents of both districts have lobbied to keep their respective high schools." The two districts reached out to other potential grade-sharing parties in the meantime. By June 2015 the MMC and RU districts resumed talks, and the districts ultimately reached an agreement regarding the grade sharing.

In 2016 the districts began grade-sharing, and the two together operate under the name "MMCRU Schools". The "Royals" were the chosen mascot. As part of the arrangement, both districts have their own elementary schools, with RU having a combined middle school and MMC with the combined high school. Breeanna Pearce of the Le Mars Daily Sentinel wrote that "Initially, the program met with some harsh criticism", and that there were fewer administrators, but that due to a successfully merging of operations, "MMCRU continues to gather support." The MMCRU is not yet legally a district.

== Schools ==
The district formerly operated its own elementary, middle, and high school.

=== MMRCU High School ===
==== Athletics ====
The Royals compete in the following sports in the War Eagle Conference:

- Cross Country
- Volleyball
- Football
  - 2025 Class A State Champions
- Bowling
- Basketball
- Wrestling
- Track and Field
- Golf
- Baseball
- Softball

== See also ==
- List of school districts in Iowa
- List of high schools in Iowa
