= Remsen, Iowa =

- City
- Location in Iowa
- Coordinates: 42°48′57″N 95°58′21″W
- Country: USA
- State: Iowa
- County: Plymouth
- Incorporated: 1889

Government
  - Type: Mayor-council
  - Mayor: Craig Bartolozzi

Area
  - Total: 1.46 sq mi (3.79 km^{2})
  - Land: 1.46 sq mi (3.79 km^{2})
  - Water: 0 sq mi (0.00 km^{2})
- Elevation: 1,329 ft (405 m)

Population (2020)
  - Total: 1,678
  - Density: 1,146.1/sq mi (442.53/km^{2})
- Time zone: UTC-6 (CST)
  - Summer (DST): UTC-5 (CDT)
- ZIP code: 51050
- Area code: 712
- FIPS code: 19-66405
- GNIS feature ID: 2396348
- Website: www.remseniowa.net

Remsen is a city in Plymouth County, Iowa, United States. The population was 1,678 at the time of the 2020 census.

== History ==
On July 4, 1936, a massive fire destroyed 15 homes and 18 buildings that housed 38 businesses. The fire started when a couple young kids, never identified, were playing with fireworks when a nearby tent caught fire. With the winds and extreme heat, the fire was out of control within minutes. This resulted in an all-night battle for nearby fire departments. This led to the 84 year long ban of fireworks in Iowa.

== Geography ==
According to the United States Census Bureau, the city has a total area of 1.27 square miles (3.29 km^{2}), all land.

== Demographics ==
Historical populations
Year	Pop.	±%
1890	580	—
1900	835	+44.0%
1910	1,076	+28.9%
1920	1,144	+6.3%
1930	1,181	+3.2%
1940	1,196	+1.3%
1950	1,280	+7.0%
1960	1,338	+4.5%
1970	1,367	+2.2%
1980	1,592	+16.5%
1990	1,513	−5.0%
2000	1,762	+16.5%
2010	1,663	−5.6%
2020	1,678	+0.9%
Source:"U.S. Census website". United States Census Bureau. and Iowa Data Center; Source: U.S. Decennial Census

=== Racial and ethnic composition ===
Remsen city, Iowa – Racial composition Note: the US Census treats Hispanic/Latino as an ethnic category. This table excludes Latinos from the racial categories and assigns them to a separate category. Hispanics/Latinos may be of any race.
Race (NH = Non-Hispanic)	% 2020	% 2010	% 2000	Pop 2020	Pop 2010	Pop 2000
White alone (NH)	93.7%	97.2%	99.5%	1,573	1,617	1,753
Black alone (NH)	0.5%	0.1%	0%	9	1	0
American Indian alone (NH)	0.2%	0%	0%	3	0	0
Asian alone (NH)	0.3%	0.2%	0.1%	5	3	1
Pacific Islander alone (NH)	0.6%	0%	0%	10	0	0
Other race alone (NH)	0%	0.1%	0%	0	1	0
Multiracial (NH)	2.1%	0.5%	0.1%	36	9	2
Hispanic/Latino (any race)	2.5%	1.9%	0.3%	42	32	6

=== 2020 census ===
As of the 2020 census, there were 1,678 people, 666 households, and 447 families residing in the city. The population density was 1,146.1 inhabitants per square mile (442.5/km^{2}). The median age was 41.5 years. 23.8% of residents were under the age of 18 and 24.9% were 65 years of age or older. The age distribution was 26.1% under 20, 3.9% from 20 to 24, 23.4% from 25 to 44, 21.8% from 45 to 64, and 24.9% 65 or older. For every 100 females, there were 88.1 males, and for every 100 females age 18 and over, there were 88.1 males age 18 and over.

Of the 666 households, 30.5% had children under the age of 18 living in them. Of all households, 54.2% were married-couple households, 6.0% were cohabiting-couple households, 16.5% were households with a male householder and no spouse or partner present, and 23.3% were households with a female householder and no spouse or partner present. About 32.9% of households were non-families, 29.2% of all households were made up of individuals, and 18.2% had someone living alone who was 65 years of age or older.

There were 709 housing units at an average density of 484.3 per square mile (187.0/km^{2}), of which 6.1% were vacant. The homeowner vacancy rate was 0.5% and the rental vacancy rate was 12.3%.

0.0% of residents lived in urban areas, while 100.0% lived in rural areas.

The most reported ancestries were German (48.2%), Irish (11.2%), English (10.7%), Luxembourger (9.4%), Dutch (2.6%), and Swedish (1.5%).

=== 2010 census ===
As of the census of 2010, there were 1,663 people, 645 households, and 436 families living in the city. The population density was 1,309.4 inhabitants per square mile (505.6/km^{2}). There were 704 housing units at an average density of 554.3 per square mile (214.0/km^{2}). The racial makeup of the city was 98.2% White, 0.1% African American, 0.5% Native American, 0.2% Asian, 0.5% from other races, and 0.5% from two or more races. Hispanic or Latino of any race were 1.9% of the population.

There were 645 households, of which 32.1% had children under the age of 18 living with them, 55.8% were married couples living together, 8.2% had a female householder with no husband present, 3.6% had a male householder with no wife present, and 32.4% were non-families. 29.6% of all households were made up of individuals, and 15.5% had someone living alone who was 65 years of age or older. The average household size was 2.50 and the average family size was 3.11.

The median age in the city was 41.4 years. 27.8% of residents were under the age of 18; 5.3% were between the ages of 18 and 24; 21.8% were from 25 to 44; 24.7% were from 45 to 64; and 20.4% were 65 years of age or older. The gender makeup of the city was 47.4% male and 52.6% female.

=== 2000 census ===
As of the census of 2000, there were 1,762 people, 671 households, and 460 families living in the city. The population density was 1,655.2 inhabitants per square mile (639.1/km^{2}). There were 701 housing units at an average density of 658.5 per square mile (254.2/km^{2}). The racial makeup of the city was 99.49% White, 0.06% Asian, 0.11% from other races, and 0.34% from two or more races. Hispanic or Latino of any race were 0.34% of the population.

There were 671 households, out of which 34.0% had children under the age of 18 living with them, 59.3% were married couples living together, 6.0% had a female householder with no husband present, and 31.4% were non-families. 28.3% of all households were made up of individuals, and 17.9% had someone living alone who was 65 years of age or older. The average household size was 2.53 and the average family size was 3.15.

28.9% were under the age of 18, 5.2% from 18 to 24, 24.3% from 25 to 44, 17.6% from 45 to 64, and 24.0% were 65 years of age or older. The median age was 39 years. For every 100 females, there were 93.0 males. For every 100 females age 18 and over, there were 86.5 males.

The median household income was $37,950 and the median family income was $48,250. Males had a median income of $32,841 versus $21,094 for females. The per capita income for the city was $17,465. About 3.3% of families and 5.7% of the population were below the poverty line, including 6.3% of those under age 18 and 6.3% of those age 65 or over.

== Education ==
It is within the Remsen Union Community School District. The MMC district currently operates as "MMCRU" schools as part of a grade-sharing arrangement with the Marcus-Meriden-Cleghorn Community School District.

It also houses Remsen St. Mary's, a private, Roman Catholic school.
