= Cleveden Secondary School =

- Main Entrance

Location
- 42 Cleveden Road, Kelvinside; Glasgow, G12 0JW; Scotland; 55.8866°N 4.3035°W

Information
- Type: Secondary School
- Founder: Glasgow City Council
- Local authority: Glasgow City Council
- Head Teacher: Claire Wilson
- Staff: 110
- Gender: Mixed
- Age: 12 to 18
- Enrolment: 965
- Houses: Eagle, Falcon, Harrier & Osprey
- Colours: White & Brick
- School Years: S1–S6
- Website: www.clevedensecondary.com

Cleveden Secondary School is located in Kelvinside in the West End of Glasgow.

== The school ==
The school can trace its origin back to 1894 and the founding of the Glasgow High School for Girls in Garnethill. In August 1968, the school moved to new purpose built premises in Kelvindale. It began accepting both male and female pupils in 1973 and was officially re-named as Cleveden Secondary School. The school exists in its current form as the result of a merger between Cleveden and North Kelvinside Secondary Schools between 1998 and 2001.

The Head Teacher is Mrs Claire Wilson who was appointed on 9 October 2020.

It won £1000 from two students winning the Bloodhound Racecar Challenge in 2016.

== Feeder schools ==
Cleveden currently has nine feeder schools, which cover a large area of the north-west of the city. They are Cadder Primary School, Caldercuilt Primary School, Dunard Primary School, Kelvindale Primary School, Maryhill Primary School, Parkview Primary School, Ruchill Primary School, Westercommon Primary School

== Facilities ==
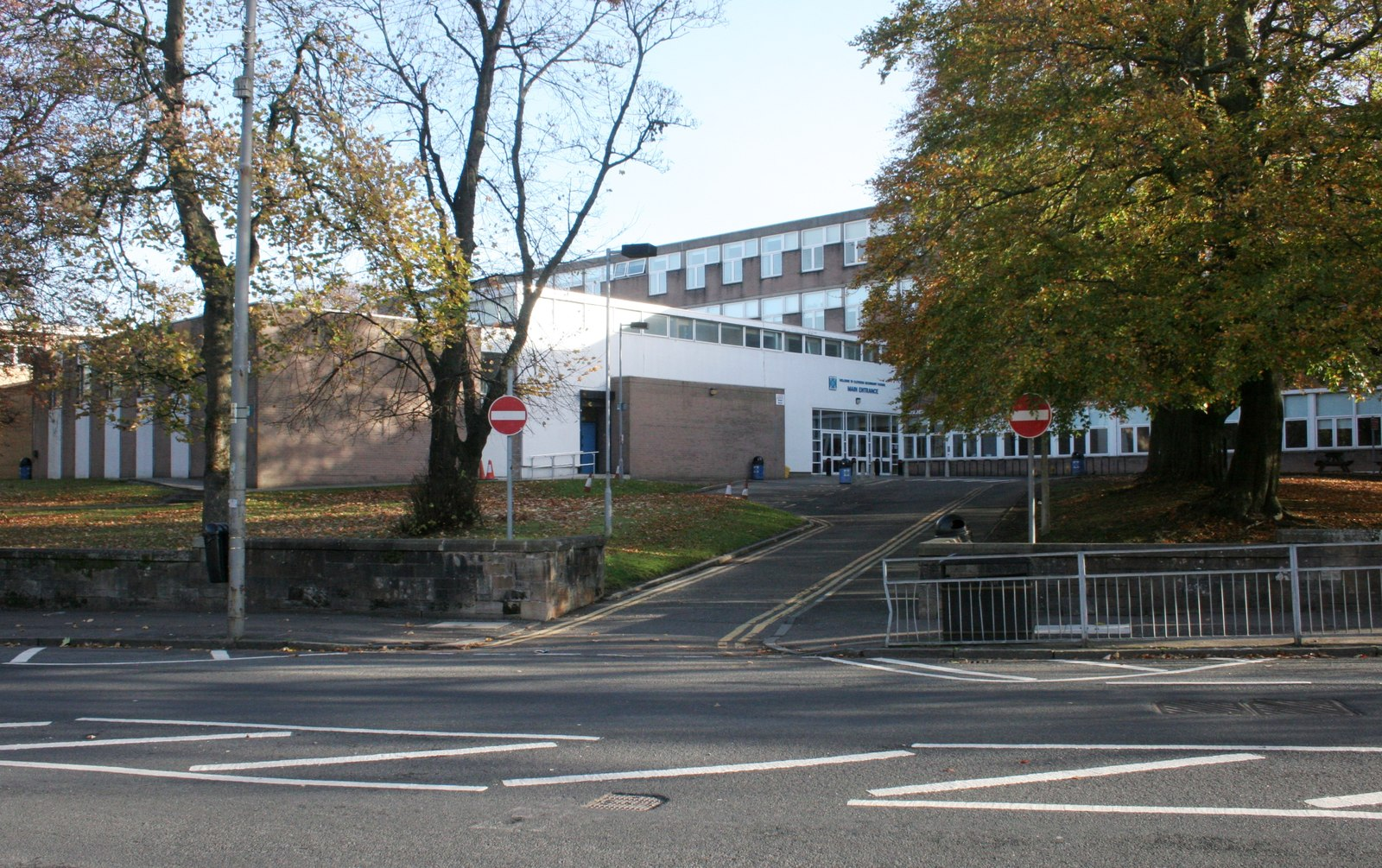
View of the school from Cleveden Road

Following an extension and refurbishment, the school building was officially re-opened by the then-Scottish Labour First Minister, Jack McConnell, on 8 February 2002. The new extensions provide twenty-six teaching spaces including general classrooms, music, drama, sports and technical facilities, as well as administration offices. A striking new social space was added offering a dining and performing space for pupils. In addition to the general refurbishment of the existing school building, the works also included provision of a rationalised suite of eight ICT classrooms and thirteen departmental bases. Every teaching space, office and administration area now has ICT provision.

The renovated building now has thirty-one classrooms, eight dedicated ICT teaching areas, ten science labs, five technical rooms, five art and design rooms, three home economics rooms, three music rooms, gymnasium, games hall, fitness suite and swimming pool. The library was also revamped and a new IT Learning Centre was created to help pupils and teachers make the most of internet technology. The works also provided a new synthetic sports pitch within the school grounds and a further two grass pitches and one blaes pitch located at the nearby Kirklee site.
