= Oscar L. Olson =

President of Luther College in Iowa

Oscar L. Olson (February 3, 1872 – November 19, 1956) was the third President of Luther College. He was the first layperson to become President of a major Lutheran college in the United States.

== Early life ==
Olson was born on February 3, 1872, in Chicago, Illinois, to Andrew B. Olson and Guroe Larsen Krogstad. They moved to Sycamore, Illinois, in 1874, to Dixon, Illinois, in 1875, and Marcus, Iowa, in 1879. Olson entered Luther College in 1886. He graduated as Valedictorian in 1896. He completed a Master of Arts at the University of Minnesota and a Ph.D. in English at the University of Chicago in 1914.

== Career ==
In 1901, Olson began teaching English at Luther College, his alma mater. After the death of Christian Keyser Preus in 1921, Olson was appointed as President of Luther College, becoming the first layperson to serve as President of a major Lutheran college. Expansion of the campus continued under Olson's presidency, with the addition of the C.K. Preus Gymnasium and Nustad Field, and the acquisition of the Jewell Farm. Olson also advocated moving away from the traditional classics curriculum and allowing for the admission of women to the college. Although women were not allowed to be admitted during his presidency, he did successfully convince the board to move away from the classics curriculum. On December 18, 1926, Olson inaugurated the campus radio station, KWLC, by reading the Gettysburg Address at the start of the first broadcast. In 1932, due to mounting debt in part because of the Great Depression, the board asked Olson to resign, which he agreed to do. Olson continued teaching English at Luther College until retiring in 1952. Olson died in 1956.

== Legacy ==
During homecoming on October 12, 1951, Olson was awarded an honorary Doctor of Letters degree by Luther College.

Olson Hall, a dormitory on the Luther College campus, was built and named in his honor in 1955.

== Selected publications ==
- Olson, O. L. (1914). Beowulf and The Feast of Bricriu. Modern Philology, 11(3), 407-427.
- Olson, O. L. (1916). The Relation of the Hrólfs saga kraka and the Bjarkarímur to Beowulf. Publications of the Society for the Advancement of Scandinavian.
