= Mary Hill =

Mary Hill may refer to:

== Heiresses ==
- Mary Hill, Countess of Hillsborough (1725/26–1780), English peeress, daughter of 4th Baron Stawell
- Mary Hill of Gairbraid (1730–1809), Scottish heiress and namesake of Glasgow district Maryhill
- Mary Hill, Marchioness of Downshire (1764–1836), Anglo-Irish politician, wife of Arthur Hill, 2nd Marquess of Downshire
- Lady Mary Hill (1796–1830), daughter of Arthur Hill, 2nd Marquess of Downshire
- Lady Mary Penelope Hill (1817–1884), daughter of Arthur Hill, 3rd Marquess of Downshire, wife of Alexander Hood, 1st Viscount Bridport

== Scholars ==
- Mary Hill (physician) (1892–1987), American longest-practitioner in Nevada, married name Mary Hill Fulstone
- Mary Elliott Hill (1907–1969), African-American chemist
- Mary C. Hill, American hydrologist and professor since 1980s
- Mary Lynne Gasaway Hill (born 1964), American poet, writer and professor

== Others ==
- Mary G. Hill (1803–1884), American temperance activist
- Mary Edna Hill Gray Dow (1848–1914), née Hill, American financier, school principal, and correspondent
- Mary Francis Hill Coley (1900–1966), née Hill, American lay midwife
- Mary Thompson Hill Willard (1805–1892), née Hill, American teacher and social reformer
- Mary Hill (actress) (1926–2000), American performer in Mesa of Lost Women, a/k/a Paula Hill
- Mary Elizabeth Hill (born 1985), American swimming champion, a/k/a Elizabeth Hill Newman
- Mary Hill (politician) (1896–1989), American politician

== Places ==
- Mary Hill, British Columbia, Canadian neighbourhood in Port Coquitlam, British Columbia
  - Mary Hill Bypass, British Columbia Highway 7B in Canada
- Mary Hill, Iowa, American unincorporated community

== See also ==
- Hell Mary Hill, English hill near Sheffield
- Maryhill (disambiguation)
