= Amherst Township, Cherokee County, Iowa =

Township in Iowa, US

Amherst Township
- Township
- Coordinates: 42°46′30″N 095°47′53″W
- Country: United States
- State: Iowa
- County: Cherokee

Area
  - Total: 36 sq mi (93 km^{2})
  - Land: 36 sq mi (93 km^{2})
  - Water: 0 sq mi (0 km^{2})
- Elevation: 1,394 ft (425 m)

Population (2000)
  - Total: 324
  - Density: 9.1/sq mi (3.5/km^{2})
- FIPS code: 19-90063
- GNIS feature ID: 0467393

Amherst Township is one of sixteen townships in Cherokee County, Iowa, United States. As of the 2000 census, its population was 324.

== Geography ==
Amherst Township covers an area of 35.91 square miles (93.0 km^{2}) and contains no incorporated settlements.
