= Meriden, Iowa =

- City
- Location of Meriden, Iowa
- Coordinates: 42°47′40″N 95°38′03″W
- Country: USA
- State: Iowa
- County: Cherokee

Area
  - Total: 0.11 sq mi (0.29 km^{2})
  - Land: 0.11 sq mi (0.29 km^{2})
  - Water: 0 sq mi (0.00 km^{2})
- Elevation: 1,411 ft (430 m)

Population (2020)
  - Total: 161
  - Density: 1,422.0/sq mi (549.05/km^{2})
- Time zone: UTC-6 (Central (CST))
  - Summer (DST): UTC-5 (CDT)
- ZIP code: 51037
- Area code: 712
- FIPS code: 19-51150
- GNIS feature ID: 2395101

Meriden is a city in Cherokee County, Iowa, United States. The population was 161 at the time of the 2020 census.

== Geography ==
According to the United States Census Bureau, the city has a total area of 0.11 square miles (0.28 km^{2}), all land.

== Demographics ==
Historical population
Census	Pop.	Note	%±
1890	241		—
1900	432		79.3%
1910	246		−43.1%
1920	218		−11.4%
1930	188		−13.8%
1940	200		6.4%
1950	164		−18.0%
1960	192		17.1%
1970	167		−13.0%
1980	233		39.5%
1990	193		−17.2%
2000	184		−4.7%
2010	159		−13.6%
2020	161		1.3%
U.S. Decennial Census

=== 2020 census ===
As of the census of 2020, there were 161 people, 57 households, and 42 families residing in the city. The population density was 1,422.0 inhabitants per square mile (549.1/km^{2}). There were 79 housing units at an average density of 697.8 per square mile (269.4/km^{2}). The racial makeup of the city was 99.4% White, 0.0% Black or African American, 0.0% Native American, 0.0% Asian, 0.0% Pacific Islander, 0.6% from other races and 0.0% from two or more races. Hispanic or Latino persons of any race comprised 0.6% of the population.

Of the 57 households, 42.1% of which had children under the age of 18 living with them, 61.4% were married couples living together, 3.5% were cohabitating couples, 19.3% had a female householder with no spouse or partner present and 15.8% had a male householder with no spouse or partner present. 26.3% of all households were non-families. 24.6% of all households were made up of individuals, 5.3% had someone living alone who was 65 years old or older.

The median age in the city was 32.8 years. 31.1% of the residents were under the age of 20; 5.6% were between the ages of 20 and 24; 29.8% were from 25 and 44; 16.8% were from 45 and 64; and 16.8% were 65 years of age or older. The gender makeup of the city was 53.4% male and 46.6% female.

=== 2010 census ===
As of the census of 2010, there were 159 people, 77 households, and 47 families living in the city. The population density was 1,445.5 inhabitants per square mile (558.1/km^{2}). There were 84 housing units at an average density of 763.6 per square mile (294.8/km^{2}). The racial makeup of the city was 100.0% White.

There were 77 households, of which 18.2% had children under the age of 18 living with them, 49.4% were married couples living together, 5.2% had a female householder with no husband present, 6.5% had a male householder with no wife present, and 39.0% were non-families. 31.2% of all households were made up of individuals, and 11.7% had someone living alone who was 65 years of age or older. The average household size was 2.06 and the average family size was 2.49.

The median age in the city was 47.4 years. 17% of residents were under the age of 18; 7.5% were between the ages of 18 and 24; 21.4% were from 25 to 44; 37.1% were from 45 to 64; and 17% were 65 years of age or older. The gender makeup of the city was 49.1% male and 50.9% female.

=== 2000 census ===
As of the census of 2000, there were 184 people, 84 households, and 55 families living in the city. The population density was 1,660.9 inhabitants per square mile (641.3/km^{2}). There were 90 housing units at an average density of 812.4 per square mile (313.7/km^{2}). The racial makeup of the city was 100.00% White.

There were 84 households, out of which 26.2% had children under the age of 18 living with them, 59.5% were married couples living together, 3.6% had a female householder with no husband present, and 34.5% were non-families. 29.8% of all households were made up of individuals, and 14.3% had someone living alone who was 65 years of age or older. The average household size was 2.19 and the average family size was 2.71.

In the city, the population was spread out, with 19.0% under the age of 18, 4.9% from 18 to 24, 30.4% from 25 to 44, 25.0% from 45 to 64, and 20.7% who were 65 years of age or older. The median age was 43 years. For every 100 females, there were 95.7 males. For every 100 females age 18 and over, there were 91.0 males.

The median income for a household in the city was $24,750, and the median income for a family was $33,393. Males had a median income of $25,000 versus $16,250 for females. The per capita income for the city was $14,755. About 10.2% of families and 11.4% of the population were below the poverty line, including 4.5% of those under the age of eighteen and 14.9% of those 65 or over.

== Education ==
It is within the Marcus-Meriden-Cleghorn Community School District. The district formed on July 1, 1993 as a result of the merger of the Marcus and Meriden-Cleghorn school districts.
