= Silver Township, Cherokee County, Iowa =

Township in Iowa, US

Silver Township
- Township
- Coordinates: 42°36′31″N 095°33′29″W
- Country: United States
- State: Iowa
- County: Cherokee

Area
  - Total: 35.71 sq mi (92.48 km^{2})
  - Land: 35.68 sq mi (92.42 km^{2})
  - Water: 0.023 sq mi (0.06 km^{2})
- Elevation: 1,342 ft (409 m)

Population (2000)
  - Total: 262
  - Density: 7.3/sq mi (2.8/km^{2})
- FIPS code: 19-93891
- GNIS feature ID: 0468708

Silver Township is one of sixteen townships in Cherokee County, Iowa, United States. As of the 2000 census, its population was 262.

== Geography ==
Silver Township covers an area of 35.71 square miles (92.5 km^{2}) and contains no incorporated settlements. According to the USGS, it contains one cemetery, Silver.
