= Rock Township, Cherokee County, Iowa =

Township in Iowa, US

Rock Township
- Township
- Coordinates: 42°41′39″N 095°40′50″W
- Country: United States
- State: Iowa
- County: Cherokee

Area
  - Total: 35.9 sq mi (93.1 km^{2})
  - Land: 35.93 sq mi (93.07 km^{2})
  - Water: 0.0077 sq mi (0.02 km^{2})
- Elevation: 1,286 ft (392 m)

Population (2022)
  - Total: 4,546
  - Density: 128.399411/sq mi (49.5752896/km^{2})
- FIPS code: 19-93657
- GNIS feature ID: 0468627

Rock Township is one of sixteen townships in Cherokee County, Iowa, United States. At the 2022 census, its population was 4,546.

== Geography ==
Rock Township covers an area of 35.95 square miles (93.1 km^{2}) and contains no incorporated settlements. According to the USGS, it contains one cemetery, Rock Township.
