= Cherokee County, Iowa =

County in Iowa, United States

- County
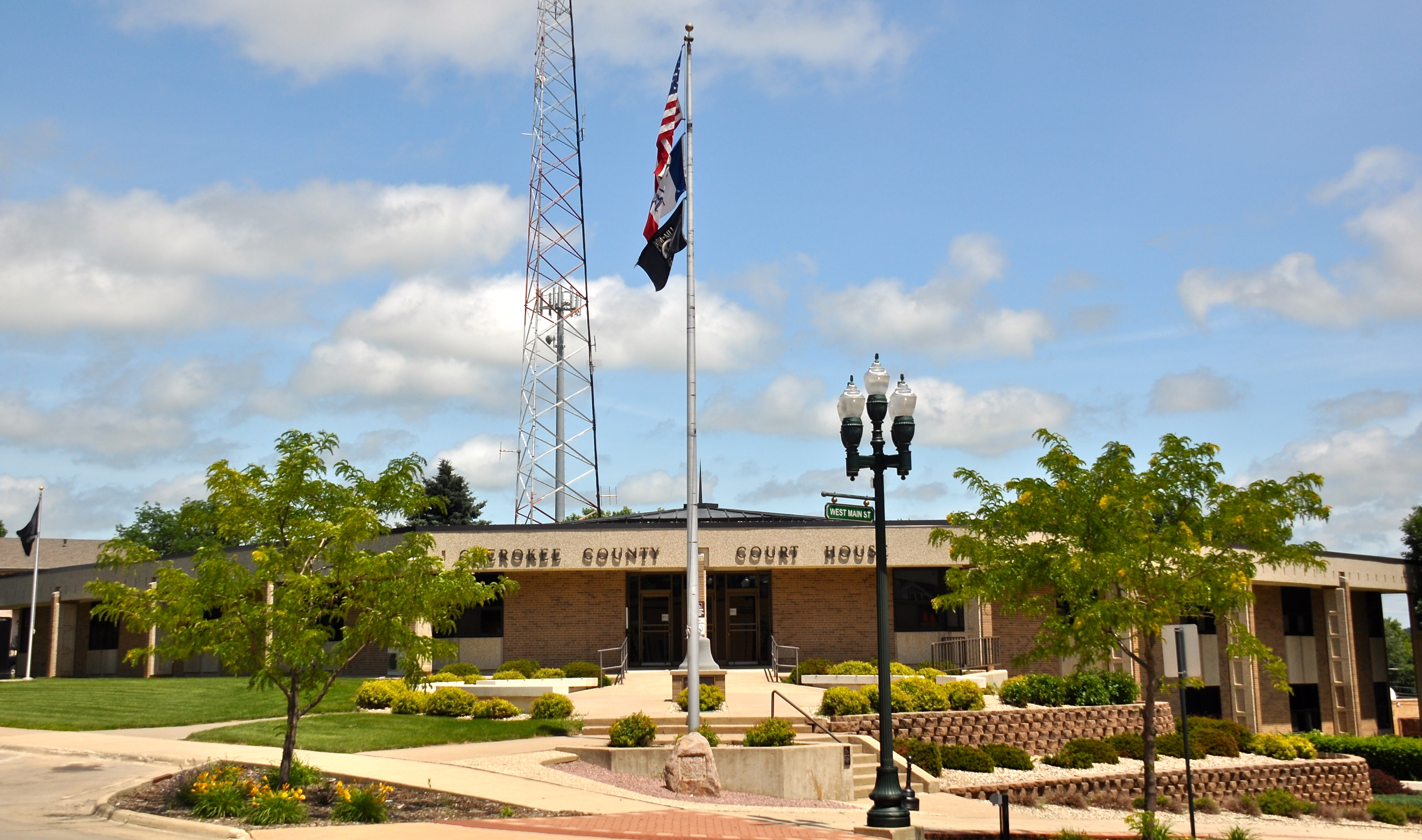
- Cherokee County Courthouse, July 2014

- Location within the U.S. state of Iowa
- Coordinates: 42°44′05″N 95°37′27″W
- Country: United States
- State: Iowa
- Founded: 1851
- Named for: Cherokee people
- Seat: Cherokee
- Largest city: Cherokee

Area
  - Total: 577 sq mi (1,490 km^{2})
  - Land: 577 sq mi (1,490 km^{2})
  - Water: 0.2 sq mi (0.52 km^{2}) 0.03%

Population (2020)
  - Total: 11,658
  - Estimate (2025): 11,369 ▼
  - Density: 20.2/sq mi (7.80/km^{2})
- Time zone: UTC−6 (Central)
  - Summer (DST): UTC−5 (CDT)
- Congressional district: 4th
- Website: www.cherokeecounty.iowa.gov
- Iowa county number 18

Cherokee County is a county located in the U.S. state of Iowa. As of the 2020 census, the population was 11,658. The county seat is Cherokee. The county was formed on January 15, 1851, from open territory. It was named after the Cherokee people.

== Geography ==
According to the U.S. Census Bureau, the county has a total area of 577 square miles (1,490 km^{2}), of which 577 square miles (1,490 km^{2}) is land and 0.2 square miles (0.52 km^{2}) (0.03%) is water.

=== Major highways ===
- U.S. Highway 59
- Iowa Highway 3
- Iowa Highway 7
- Iowa Highway 31
- Iowa Highway 143

=== Adjacent counties ===
- O'Brien County (north)
- Buena Vista County (east)
- Ida County (south)
- Woodbury County (southwest)
- Plymouth County (west)

== Demographics ==
Historical population
Census	Pop.	Note	%±
1860	58		—
1870	1,967		3,291.4%
1880	8,240		318.9%
1890	15,659		90.0%
1900	16,570		5.8%
1910	16,741		1.0%
1920	17,760		6.1%
1930	18,737		5.5%
1940	19,258		2.8%
1950	19,052		−1.1%
1960	18,598		−2.4%
1970	17,269		−7.1%
1980	16,238		−6.0%
1990	14,098		−13.2%
2000	13,035		−7.5%
2010	12,072		−7.4%
2020	11,658		−3.4%
2025 (est.)	11,369	▼	−2.5%
U.S. Decennial Census; 1790-1960 1900-1990; 1990-2000 2010-2018

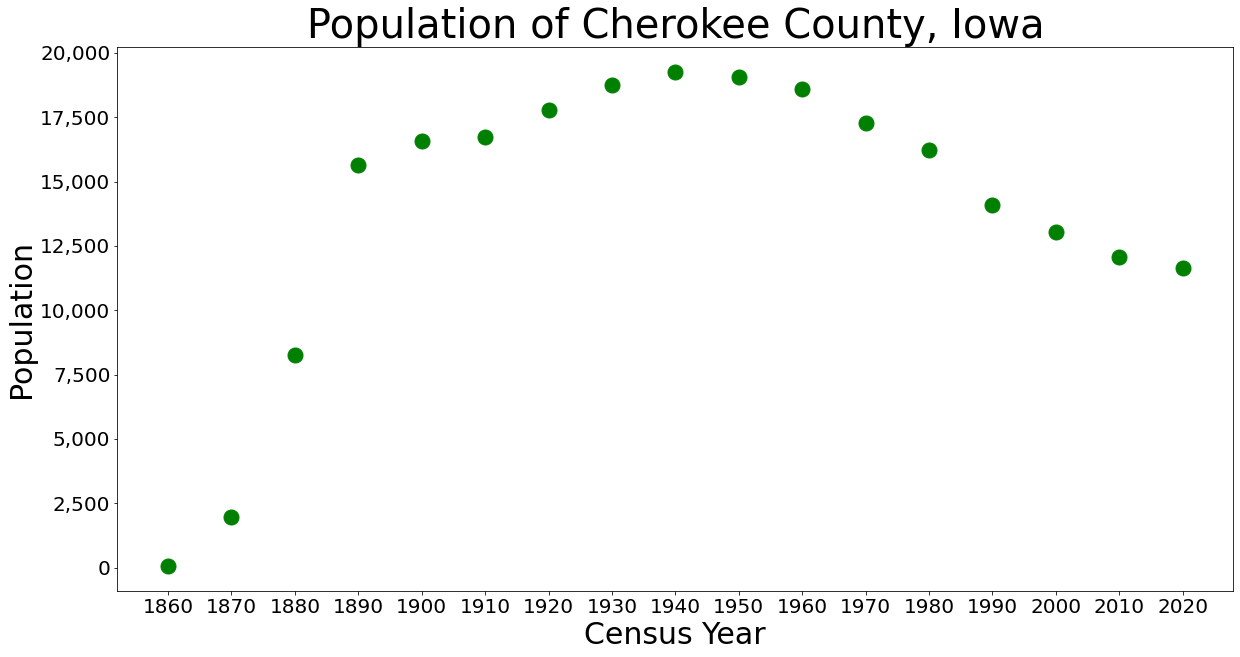
Population of Cherokee County from US census data

=== 2020 census ===
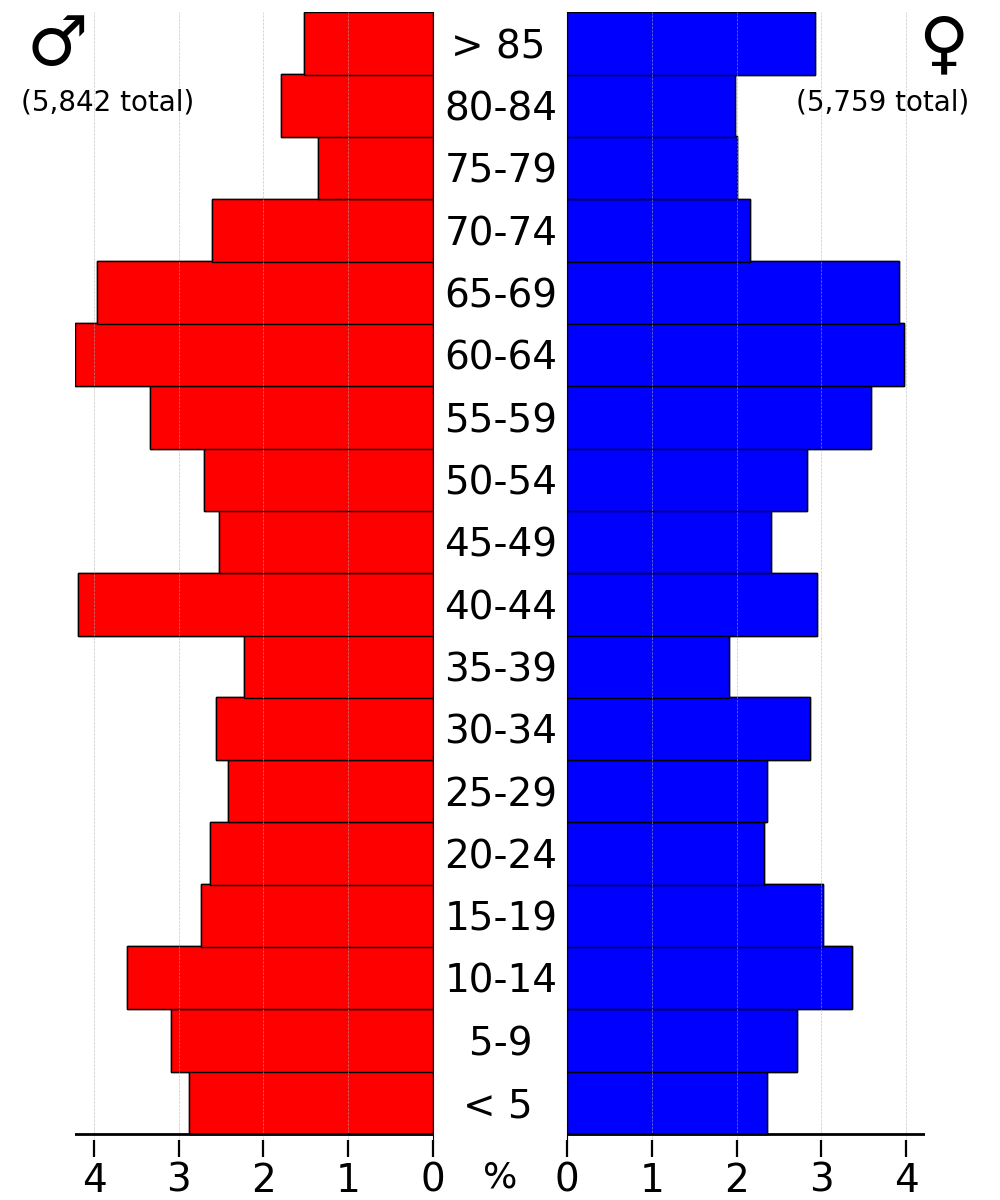
2022 US Census population pyramid for Cherokee County from ACS 5-year estimates

As of the 2020 census, the county had a population of 11,658 and a population density of 20.3/sq mi (7.8/km^{2}). 96.59% of the population reported being of one race.

The racial makeup of the county was 92.9% White, 0.7% Black or African American, 0.3% American Indian and Alaska Native, 0.5% Asian, 0.1% Native Hawaiian and Pacific Islander, 2.0% from some other race, and 3.4% from two or more races. Hispanic or Latino residents of any race comprised 4.5% of the population.

The median age was 46.0 years, 21.7% of residents were under the age of 18, and 25.1% of residents were 65 years of age or older. For every 100 females there were 100.0 males, and for every 100 females age 18 and over there were 99.7 males age 18 and over.

40.4% of residents lived in urban areas, while 59.6% lived in rural areas.

There were 5,008 households in the county, of which 24.8% had children under the age of 18 living in them. Of all households, 51.1% were married-couple households, 19.4% were households with a male householder and no spouse or partner present, and 23.1% were households with a female householder and no spouse or partner present. About 32.1% of all households were made up of individuals and 16.8% had someone living alone who was 65 years of age or older. There were 5,558 housing units, of which 9.9% were vacant. Among occupied housing units, 77.0% were owner-occupied and 23.0% were renter-occupied. The homeowner vacancy rate was 2.1% and the rental vacancy rate was 8.4%.

=== 2010 census ===
The 2010 census recorded a population of 12,072 in the county, with a population density of 21.3/sq mi (8.2/km^{2}). There were 5,777 housing units, of which 5,207 were occupied.

=== 2000 census ===
As of the census of 2000, there were 13,035 people, 5,378 households, and 3,597 families residing in the county. The population density was 23 people per square mile (8.9 people/km^{2}). There were 5,850 housing units at an average density of 10 units per square mile (3.9 units/km^{2}). The racial makeup of the county was 98.33% White, 0.31% Black or African American, 0.16% Native American, 0.43% Asian, 0.37% from other races, and 0.40% from two or more races. 0.95% of the population were Hispanic or Latino of any race.

There were 5,378 households, out of which 29.10% had children under the age of 18 living with them, 57.30% were married couples living together, 6.50% had a female householder with no husband present, and 33.10% were non-families. 29.50% of all households were made up of individuals, and 15.30% had someone living alone who was 65 years of age or older. The average household size was 2.35 and the average family size was 2.91.

In the county, the population was spread out, with 24.60% under the age of 18, 6.80% from 18 to 24, 24.00% from 25 to 44, 24.30% from 45 to 64, and 20.40% who were 65 years of age or older. The median age was 42 years. For every 100 females there were 97.40 males. For every 100 females age 18 and over, there were 92.70 males.

The median income for a household in the county was $35,142, and the median income for a family was $42,897. Males had a median income of $29,612 versus $21,181 for females. The per capita income for the county was $17,934. About 5.50% of families and 7.30% of the population were below the poverty line, including 9.70% of those under age 18 and 5.70% of those age 65 or over.

== Communities ==
=== Cities ===
- Aurelia
- Cherokee
- Cleghorn
- Larrabee
- Marcus
- Meriden
- Quimby
- Washta

=== Townships ===
Cherokee County is divided into sixteen townships:

- Afton
- Amherst
- Cedar
- Cherokee
- Diamond
- Grand Meadow
- Liberty
- Marcus
- Pilot
- Pitcher
- Rock
- Sheridan
- Silver
- Spring
- Tilden
- Willow

=== Population ranking ===
The population ranking of the following table is based on the 2020 census of Cherokee County.

† county seat

Rank	City/Town/etc.	Municipal type	Population (2020 Census)
1	† Cherokee	City	5,199
2	Marcus	City	1,079
3	Aurelia	City	968
4	Quimby	City	249
5	Washta	City	209
6	Cleghorn	City	240
7	Meriden	City	161
8	Larrabee	City	123

== Politics ==
United States presidential election results for Cherokee County, Iowa
Year	Republican		Democratic		Third party(ies)	
Year	No.	%	No.	%	No.	%
1896	2,343	60.08%	1,464	37.54%	93	2.38%
1900	2,432	63.10%	1,253	32.51%	169	4.39%
1904	2,446	74.60%	688	20.98%	145	4.42%
1908	2,300	66.07%	1,084	31.14%	97	2.79%
1912	381	12.32%	930	30.08%	1,781	57.60%
1916	1,578	48.26%	1,646	50.34%	46	1.41%
1920	4,544	77.69%	1,211	20.70%	94	1.61%
1924	3,240	52.29%	904	14.59%	2,052	33.12%
1928	3,909	58.91%	2,701	40.71%	25	0.38%
1932	2,570	34.81%	4,701	63.68%	111	1.50%
1936	2,902	36.99%	4,716	60.11%	227	2.89%
1940	4,458	53.50%	3,855	46.27%	19	0.23%
1944	3,723	53.58%	3,197	46.01%	29	0.42%
1948	3,318	46.44%	3,739	52.34%	87	1.22%
1952	6,018	70.46%	2,502	29.29%	21	0.25%
1956	4,821	59.67%	3,254	40.28%	4	0.05%
1960	4,791	59.10%	3,309	40.82%	6	0.07%
1964	3,180	42.26%	4,336	57.62%	9	0.12%
1968	4,436	59.18%	2,705	36.09%	355	4.74%
1972	4,726	62.23%	2,780	36.61%	88	1.16%
1976	3,993	53.40%	3,358	44.91%	127	1.70%
1980	4,087	54.49%	2,719	36.25%	694	9.25%
1984	4,046	54.16%	3,349	44.83%	75	1.00%
1988	3,218	46.94%	3,574	52.14%	63	0.92%
1992	2,768	40.16%	2,590	37.57%	1,535	22.27%
1996	2,629	41.27%	2,853	44.79%	888	13.94%
2000	3,463	52.53%	2,845	43.16%	284	4.31%
2004	3,758	55.30%	2,988	43.97%	50	0.74%
2008	3,372	52.95%	2,890	45.38%	106	1.66%
2012	3,662	57.08%	2,634	41.06%	119	1.86%
2016	4,192	66.99%	1,679	26.83%	387	6.18%
2020	4,495	68.96%	1,936	29.70%	87	1.33%
2024	4,398	72.04%	1,611	26.39%	96	1.57%

== Education ==
School districts include:

- Alta-Aurelia Community School District - Formed on July 1, 2018.
- Cherokee Community School District
- Galva-Holstein Community School District - Former on July 1, 1980.
- Kingsley-Pierson Community School District
- Marcus-Meriden-Cleghorn Community School District - Former on July 1, 1993.
- River Valley Community School District - Former on July 1, 1996.
- Sioux Central Community School District - Former on July 1, 1993.
- South O'Brien Community School District - Former on July 1, 1993.

Former school districts:

- Alta Community School District - Merged into Alta-Aurelia on July 1, 2018.
- Aurelia Community School District - Merged into Alta-Aurelia on July 1, 2018.

== See also ==
- National Register of Historic Places listings in Cherokee County, Iowa
