= Cleghorn, Iowa =

City in Iowa, United States

- City
- Location of Cleghorn, Iowa
- Coordinates: 42°48′45″N 95°42′46″W
- Country: US
- State: Iowa
- County: Cherokee

Area
  - Total: 0.23 sq mi (0.59 km^{2})
  - Land: 0.23 sq mi (0.59 km^{2})
  - Water: 0 sq mi (0.00 km^{2})
- Elevation: 1,470 ft (450 m)

Population (2020)
  - Total: 240
  - Density: 1,052.8/sq mi (406.47/km^{2})
- Time zone: UTC-6 (Central (CST))
  - Summer (DST): UTC-5 (CDT)
- ZIP code: 51014
- Area code: 712
- FIPS code: 19-14115
- GNIS feature ID: 2393556
- Website: http://cleghorniowa.com/

Cleghorn is a city in Cherokee County, Iowa, United States. The population was 240 at the 2020 census.

== Geography ==
According to the United States Census Bureau, the city has a total area of 0.34 square miles (0.88 km^{2}), all land.

== Demographics ==
Historical population
Census	Pop.	Note	%±
1910	186		—
1920	232		24.7%
1930	238		2.6%
1940	236		−0.8%
1950	246		4.2%
1960	228		−7.3%
1970	274		20.2%
1980	275		0.4%
1990	275		0.0%
2000	250		−9.1%
2010	240		−4.0%
2020	240		0.0%
U.S. Decennial Census

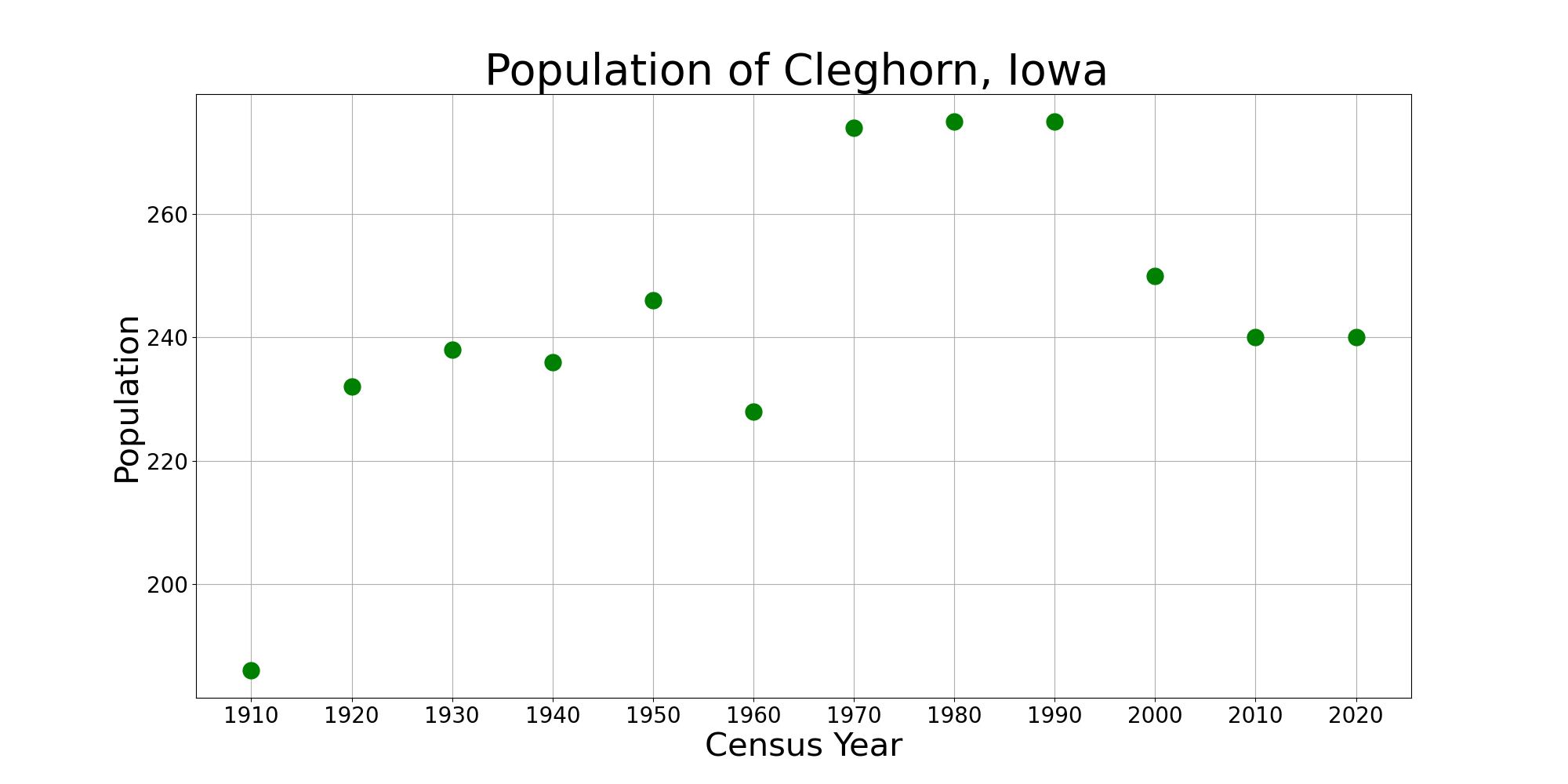
The population of Cleghorn, Iowa from US census data

=== 2020 census ===
As of the census of 2020, there were 240 people, 91 households, and 62 families residing in the city. The population density was 1,052.8 inhabitants per square mile (406.5/km^{2}). There were 105 housing units at an average density of 460.6 per square mile (177.8/km^{2}). The racial makeup of the city was 96.2% White, 0.0% Black or African American, 0.0% Native American, 0.4% Asian, 0.0% Pacific Islander, 0.8% from other races and 2.5% from two or more races. Hispanic or Latino persons of any race comprised 4.6% of the population.

Of the 91 households, 24.2% of which had children under the age of 18 living with them, 60.4% were married couples living together, 2.2% were cohabitating couples, 25.3% had a female householder with no spouse or partner present and 12.1% had a male householder with no spouse or partner present. 31.9% of all households were non-families. 30.8% of all households were made up of individuals, 15.4% had someone living alone who was 65 years old or older.

The median age in the city was 39.0 years. 31.2% of the residents were under the age of 20; 4.2% were between the ages of 20 and 24; 21.7% were from 25 and 44; 17.9% were from 45 and 64; and 25.0% were 65 years of age or older. The gender makeup of the city was 42.1% male and 57.9% female.

=== 2010 census ===
As of the census of 2010, there were 240 people, 106 households, and 71 families living in the city. The population density was 705.9 inhabitants per square mile (272.5/km^{2}). There were 113 housing units at an average density of 332.4 per square mile (128.3/km^{2}). The racial makeup of the city was 95.0% White, 0.8% African American, 0.4% Asian, and 3.8% from two or more races. Hispanic or Latino of any race were 3.8% of the population.

There were 106 households, of which 22.6% had children under the age of 18 living with them, 54.7% were married couples living together, 7.5% had a female householder with no husband present, 4.7% had a male householder with no wife present, and 33.0% were non-families. 29.2% of all households were made up of individuals, and 17% had someone living alone who was 65 years of age or older. The average household size was 2.26 and the average family size was 2.75.

The median age in the city was 43 years. 19.6% of residents were under the age of 18; 7.1% were between the ages of 18 and 24; 25% were from 25 to 44; 25.8% were from 45 to 64; and 22.5% were 65 years of age or older. The gender makeup of the city was 49.6% male and 50.4% female.

=== 2000 census ===
As of the census of 2000, there were 250 people, 103 households, and 76 families living in the city. The population density was 730.3 inhabitants per square mile (282.0/km^{2}). There were 115 housing units at an average density of 335.9 per square mile (129.7/km^{2}). The racial makeup of the city was 100.00% White.

There were 103 households, out of which 24.3% had children under the age of 18 living with them, 68.9% were married couples living together, 3.9% had a female householder with no husband present, and 26.2% were non-families. 24.3% of all households were made up of individuals, and 15.5% had someone living alone who was 65 years of age or older. The average household size was 2.43 and the average family size was 2.86.

In the city, the population was spread out, with 23.2% under the age of 18, 6.8% from 18 to 24, 20.8% from 25 to 44, 25.6% from 45 to 64, and 23.6% who were 65 years of age or older. The median age was 44 years. For every 100 females, there were 89.4 males. For every 100 females age 18 and over, there were 81.1 males.

The median income for a household in the city was $39,167, and the median income for a family was $47,500. Males had a median income of $31,094 versus $22,656 for females. The per capita income for the city was $16,886. About 4.8% of families and 4.7% of the population were below the poverty line, including 6.3% of those under the age of eighteen and 12.7% of those 65 or over.

== Education ==
It is within the Marcus-Meriden-Cleghorn Community School District. The Marcus-Meriden-Cleghorn district formed on July 1, 1993 as a result of the merger of the Marcus and Meriden-Cleghorn school districts.

The Cleghorn school temporarily closed due to the Spanish flu of 1918, then was destroyed by a fire in February 1919. Residents voted 163–92 to build a new school with a $75,000 bond. A September 3, 1919 aircraft accident damaged the under-construction school, delaying its completion. It opened in 1920 with the first graduating class the following year. In 1961 the Cleghorn and Meriden schools consolidated. The Marcus-Meriden-Cleghorn district formed on July 1, 1993 as a result of the merger of the Marcus and Meriden-Cleghorn school districts. By 2015 the school had 90 students in grades 4–6. In 2015 the district voted to close the school in order to have a yearly savings of $130,000. Students were redirected to Marcus.
