= Marcus, Iowa =

- City
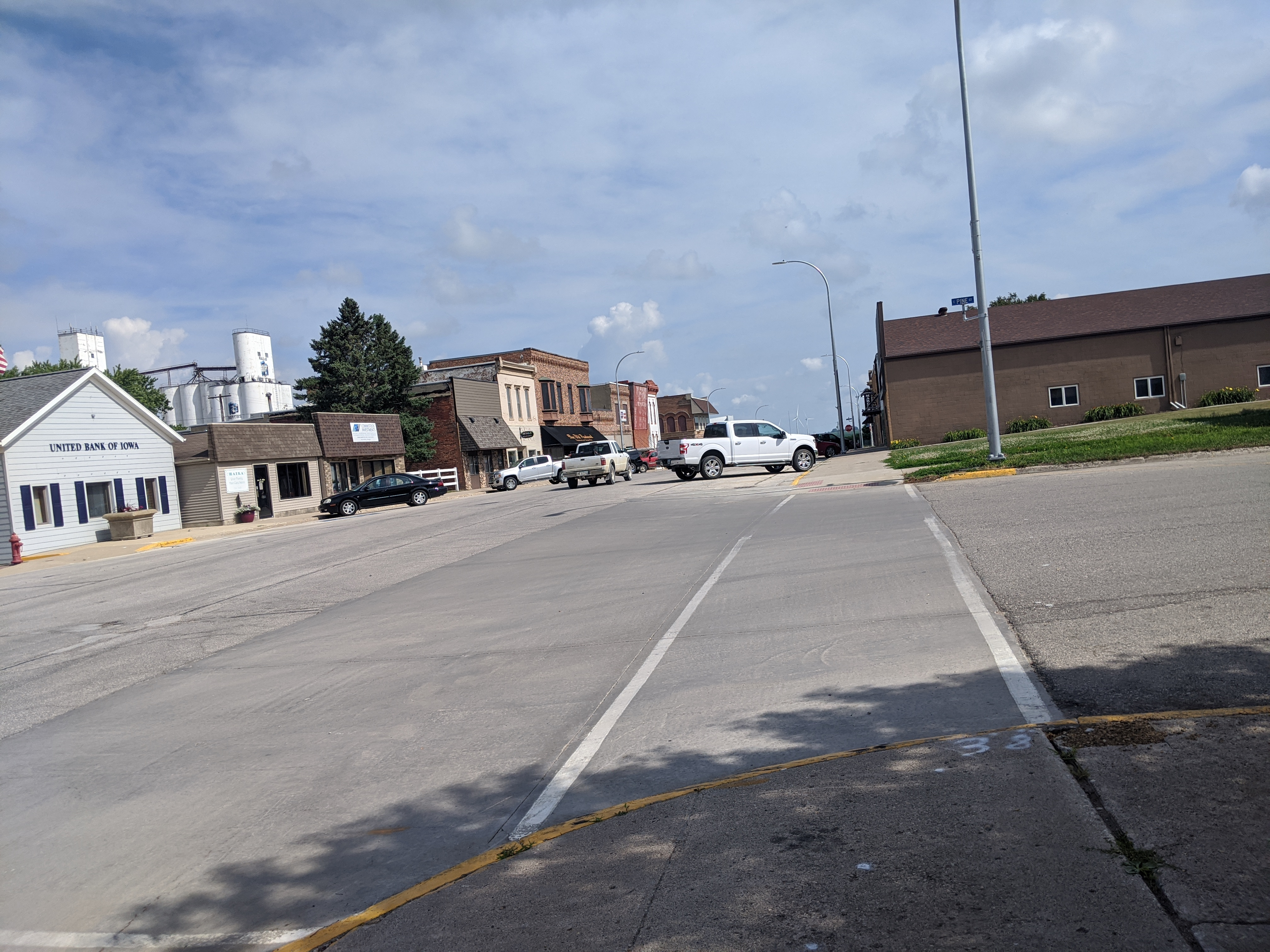
- Marcus Main Street looking North

- Location of Marcus, Iowa
- Coordinates: 42°49′21″N 95°48′25″W
- Country: USA
- State: Iowa
- County: Cherokee
- Established: May 15, 1882.

Government
  - Type: Mayor-council

Area
  - Total: 1.53 sq mi (3.96 km^{2})
  - Land: 1.53 sq mi (3.96 km^{2})
  - Water: 0 sq mi (0.00 km^{2})
- Elevation: 1,457 ft (444 m)

Population (2020)
  - Total: 1,079
  - Density: 705.7/sq mi (272.48/km^{2})
- Time zone: UTC-6 (Central (CST))
  - Summer (DST): UTC-5 (CDT)
- ZIP code: 51035
- Area code: 712
- FIPS code: 19-49350
- GNIS feature ID: 2395003
- Website: City of Marcus

Marcus is a city in Cherokee County, Iowa, United States. The population was 1,079 at the time of the 2020 census.

== History ==
The first building in Marcus was erected in 1871. Marcus was incorporated on May 15, 1882.

== Geography ==
According to the United States Census Bureau, the city has a total area of 1.54 square miles (3.99 km^{2}), all land.

== Demographics ==
Historical population
Census	Pop.	Note	%±
1880	171		—
1890	671		292.4%
1900	718		7.0%
1910	896		24.8%
1920	1,091		21.8%
1930	1,138		4.3%
1940	1,206		6.0%
1950	1,263		4.7%
1960	1,307		3.5%
1970	1,272		−2.7%
1980	1,206		−5.2%
1990	1,171		−2.9%
2000	1,139		−2.7%
2010	1,117		−1.9%
2020	1,079		−3.4%
U.S. Decennial Census

=== 2020 census ===
As of the 2020 census, Marcus had a population of 1,079 people, with 487 households and 305 families residing in the city. The population density was 705.7 inhabitants per square mile (272.5/km^{2}). There were 540 housing units at an average density of 353.2 per square mile (136.4/km^{2}).

The median age was 44.1 years. 21.8% of residents were under the age of 18. The age distribution was 22.9% under the age of 20; 4.4% from 20 to 24; 23.4% from 25 to 44; 22.9% from 45 to 64; and 26.4% who were 65 years of age or older. For every 100 females there were 97.3 males, and for every 100 females age 18 and over there were 92.7 males age 18 and over. 0.0% of residents lived in urban areas, while 100.0% lived in rural areas.

Of the 487 households, 23.2% had children under the age of 18 living with them. Of all households, 49.1% were married-couple households, 5.7% were cohabiting-couple households, 19.5% were households with a male householder and no spouse or partner present, and 25.7% were households with a female householder and no spouse or partner present. About 37.4% of all households were non-families, 33.1% were made up of individuals, and 17.2% had someone living alone who was 65 years of age or older. Of all housing units, 9.8% were vacant. The homeowner vacancy rate was 1.2% and the rental vacancy rate was 15.6%.

Racial composition as of the 2020 census
Race	Number	Percent
White	995	92.2%
Black or African American	13	1.2%
American Indian and Alaska Native	4	0.4%
Asian	2	0.2%
Native Hawaiian and Other Pacific Islander	0	0.0%
Some other race	10	0.9%
Two or more races	55	5.1%
Hispanic or Latino (of any race)	41	3.8%

=== 2010 census ===
As of the census of 2010, there were 1,117 people, 494 households, and 310 families living in the city. The population density was 725.3 inhabitants per square mile (280.0/km^{2}). There were 548 housing units at an average density of 355.8 per square mile (137.4/km^{2}). The racial makeup of the city was 98.0% White, 1.3% Native American, 0.1% Asian, and 0.6% from two or more races. Hispanic or Latino of any race were 0.7% of the population.

There were 494 households, of which 24.7% had children under the age of 18 living with them, 52.0% were married couples living together, 7.7% had a female householder with no husband present, 3.0% had a male householder with no wife present, and 37.2% were non-families. 34.0% of all households were made up of individuals, and 20.9% had someone living alone who was 65 years of age or older. The average household size was 2.20 and the average family size was 2.78.

The median age in the city was 48.5 years. 22.3% of residents were under the age of 18; 4.9% were between the ages of 18 and 24; 17.7% were from 25 to 44; 28.6% were from 45 to 64; and 26.6% were 65 years of age or older. The gender makeup of the city was 47.3% male and 52.7% female.

=== 2000 census ===
As of the census of 2000, there were 1,139 people, 477 households, and 300 families living in the city. The population density was 658.4 inhabitants per square mile (254.2/km^{2}). There were 533 housing units at an average density of 308.1 per square mile (119.0/km^{2}). The racial makeup of the city was 98.42% White, 0.35% Native American, 0.61% Asian, and 0.61% from two or more races. Hispanic or Latino of any race were 0.44% of the population.

There were 477 households, out of which 26.4% had children under the age of 18 living with them, 55.3% were married couples living together, 5.2% had a female householder with no husband present, and 36.9% were non-families. 33.8% of all households were made up of individuals, and 23.3% had someone living alone who was 65 years of age or older. The average household size was 2.28 and the average family size was 2.94.

Age spread: 22.7% under the age of 18, 5.7% from 18 to 24, 23.2% from 25 to 44, 19.8% from 45 to 64, and 28.7% who were 65 years of age or older. The median age was 44 years. For every 100 females, there were 89.8 males. For every 100 females age 18 and over, there were 83.9 males.

The median income for a household in the city was $37,604, and the median income for a family was $45,500. Males had a median income of $31,250 versus $19,167 for females. The per capita income for the city was $19,381. About 6.4% of families and 7.8% of the population were below the poverty line, including 9.0% of those under age 18 and 10.7% of those age 65 or over.

== Education ==
It is within the Marcus-Meriden-Cleghorn Community School District. The district formed on July 1, 1993 as a result of the merger of the Marcus and Meriden-Cleghorn school districts.

== Notable people ==
- Bruce Dreckman, Major League Baseball umpire
- Donald E. O'Brien, American judge
- Oscar L. Olson, third president of Luther College
- Robert E. Smylie, 24th governor of Idaho; born in Marcus
