= Washta, Iowa =

- City
- Location of Washta, Iowa
- Coordinates: 42°34′32″N 95°43′12″W
- Country: United States
- State: Iowa
- County: Cherokee

Area
  - Total: 1.01 sq mi (2.62 km^{2})
  - Land: 1.01 sq mi (2.62 km^{2})
  - Water: 0 sq mi (0.00 km^{2})
- Elevation: 1,152 ft (351 m)

Population (2020)
  - Total: 209
  - Density: 206.8/sq mi (79.86/km^{2})
- Time zone: UTC-6 (Central (CST))
  - Summer (DST): UTC-5 (CDT)
- ZIP code: 51061
- Area code: 712
- FIPS code: 19-82380
- GNIS feature ID: 2397209

Washta is a city in Cherokee County, Iowa, United States. The population was 209 at the time of the 2020 census. It is called "The Coldest Spot in Iowa", recording a temperature of −47 °F (−44 °C) without wind chill on January 12, 1912.

Washta's name dates back to 1868 when a local man named Whisman turned his farm into a trading post/mail stop for the freight train going from Correctionville, Iowa, to Cherokee, Iowa. He was asked to be the official postmaster for the area. When asked what the name of his town would be, he recalled an interesting encounter with two Native Americans the year before: While Whisman was out hunting, the two came upon him, removed his gun, looked at it, and handed it back while saying, Wash-tay, Wash-tay, meaning "good". Changing the pronunciation slightly, Whisman decided he would call the town Washta.

== Geography ==
Washta is situated near the Little Sioux River.

According to the United States Census Bureau, the city has a total area of 1.04 square miles (2.69 km^{2}), all land.

== Demographics ==
Historical population
Census	Pop.	Note	%±
1900	431		—
1910	410		−4.9%
1920	508		23.9%
1930	448		−11.8%
1940	442		−1.3%
1950	403		−8.8%
1960	310		−23.1%
1970	319		2.9%
1980	320		0.3%
1990	284		−11.2%
2000	282		−0.7%
2010	248		−12.1%
2020	209		−15.7%
U.S. Decennial Census

=== 2020 census ===
As of the census of 2020, there were 209 people, 97 households, and 61 families residing in the city. The population density was 206.8 inhabitants per square mile (79.9/km^{2}). There were 117 housing units at an average density of 115.8 per square mile (44.7/km^{2}). The racial makeup of the city was 93.8% White, 0.0% Black or African American, 0.0% Native American, 0.0% Asian, 0.0% Pacific Islander, 0.5% from other races and 5.7% from two or more races. Hispanic or Latino persons of any race comprised 0.5% of the population.

Of the 97 households, 23.7% of which had children under the age of 18 living with them, 45.4% were married couples living together, 9.3% were cohabitating couples, 27.8% had a female householder with no spouse or partner present and 17.5% had a male householder with no spouse or partner present. 37.1% of all households were non-families. 30.9% of all households were made up of individuals, 15.5% had someone living alone who was 65 years old or older.

The median age in the city was 52.1 years. 19.6% of the residents were under the age of 20; 2.4% were between the ages of 20 and 24; 20.1% were from 25 and 44; 31.6% were from 45 and 64; and 26.3% were 65 years of age or older. The gender makeup of the city was 49.8% male and 50.2% female.

=== 2010 census ===
As of the census of 2010, there were 248 people, 110 households, and 73 families residing in the city. The population density was 238.5 inhabitants per square mile (92.1/km^{2}). There were 123 housing units at an average density of 118.3 per square mile (45.7/km^{2}). The racial makeup of the city was 99.2% White, 0.4% Asian, and 0.4% from two or more races. Hispanic or Latino of any race were 2.4% of the population.

There were 110 households, of which 26.4% had children under the age of 18 living with them, 50.9% were married couples living together, 11.8% had a female householder with no husband present, 3.6% had a male householder with no wife present, and 33.6% were non-families. 30.0% of all households were made up of individuals, and 20% had someone living alone who was 65 years of age or older. The average household size was 2.25 and the average family size was 2.77.

The median age in the city was 45.8 years. 21.4% of residents were under the age of 18; 6.7% were between the ages of 18 and 24; 19.2% were from 25 to 44; 28.6% were from 45 to 64; and 23.8% were 65 years of age or older. The gender makeup of the city was 47.2% male and 52.8% female.

=== 2000 census ===
As of the census of 2000, there were 282 people, 117 households, and 69 families residing in the city. The population density was 268.5 inhabitants per square mile (103.7/km^{2}). There were 133 housing units at an average density of 126.6 per square mile (48.9/km^{2}). The racial makeup of the city was 100.00% White. Hispanic or Latino of any race were 0.71% of the population.

There were 117 households, out of which 28.2% had children under the age of 18 living with them, 47.9% were married couples living together, 6.0% had a female householder with no husband present, and 40.2% were non-families. 33.3% of all households were made up of individuals, and 16.2% had someone living alone who was 65 years of age or older. The average household size was 2.41 and the average family size was 3.14.

In the city, the population was spread out, with 26.2% under the age of 18, 7.4% from 18 to 24, 23.8% from 25 to 44, 24.8% from 45 to 64, and 17.7% who were 65 years of age or older. The median age was 38 years. For every 100 females, there were 94.5 males. For every 100 females age 18 and over, there were 96.2 males.

The median income for a household in the city was $30,673, and the median income for a family was $35,455. Males had a median income of $22,639 versus $18,750 for females. The per capita income for the city was $13,025. About 11.1% of families and 13.6% of the population were below the poverty line, including 22.8% of those under the age of 18 and 6.3% of those 65 or over.

== Education ==
The River Valley Community School District operates public schools serving the community. It was established on July 1, 1996, by the merger of the Eastwood Community School District and the Willow Community School District.
