= Quimby, Iowa =

City in Iowa, US

- City
- Location of Quimby, Iowa
- Coordinates: 42°37′35″N 95°38′50″W
- Country: USA
- State: Iowa
- County: Cherokee

Area
  - Total: 0.41 sq mi (1.06 km^{2})
  - Land: 0.41 sq mi (1.06 km^{2})
  - Water: 0 sq mi (0.00 km^{2})
- Elevation: 1,184 ft (361 m)

Population (2020)
  - Total: 249
  - Density: 611.3/sq mi (236.01/km^{2})
- Time zone: UTC-6 (Central (CST))
  - Summer (DST): UTC-5 (CDT)
- ZIP code: 51049
- Area code: 712
- FIPS code: 19-65280
- GNIS feature ID: 2396300

Quimby is a city in Cherokee County, Iowa, United States. The population was 249 at the time of the 2020 census.

== Geography ==
Quimby is located near the Little Sioux River.

According to the United States Census Bureau, the city has a total area of 0.41 square miles (1.06 km^{2}), all land.

== Demographics ==
Historical population
Census	Pop.	Note	%±
1910	268		—
1920	363		35.4%
1930	318		−12.4%
1940	363		14.2%
1950	398		9.6%
1960	369		−7.3%
1970	395		7.0%
1980	424		7.3%
1990	334		−21.2%
2000	368		10.2%
2010	319		−13.3%
2020	249		−21.9%
U.S. Decennial Census

=== 2020 census ===
As of the census of 2020, there were 249 people, 120 households, and 74 families residing in the city. The population density was 611.3 inhabitants per square mile (236.0/km^{2}). There were 139 housing units at an average density of 341.2 per square mile (131.8/km^{2}). The racial makeup of the city was 94.0% White, 0.0% Black or African American, 0.0% Native American, 0.0% Asian, 0.0% Pacific Islander, 2.4% from other races and 3.6% from two or more races. Hispanic or Latino persons of any race comprised 2.8% of the population.

Of the 120 households, 20.8% of which had children under the age of 18 living with them, 44.2% were married couples living together, 10.0% were cohabitating couples, 29.2% had a female householder with no spouse or partner present and 16.7% had a male householder with no spouse or partner present. 38.3% of all households were non-families. 32.5% of all households were made up of individuals, 13.3% had someone living alone who was 65 years old or older.

The median age in the city was 53.3 years. 19.7% of the residents were under the age of 20; 2.4% were between the ages of 20 and 24; 23.3% were from 25 and 44; 24.1% were from 45 and 64; and 30.5% were 65 years of age or older. The gender makeup of the city was 48.6% male and 51.4% female.

=== 2010 census ===
As of the census of 2010, there were 319 people, 135 households, and 95 families residing in the city. The population density was 778.0 inhabitants per square mile (300.4/km^{2}). There were 152 housing units at an average density of 370.7 per square mile (143.1/km^{2}). The racial makeup of the city was 99.4% White and 0.6% Asian. Hispanic or Latino of any race were 1.3% of the population.

There were 135 households, of which 25.9% had children under the age of 18 living with them, 57.8% were married couples living together, 7.4% had a female householder with no husband present, 5.2% had a male householder with no wife present, and 29.6% were non-families. 25.2% of all households were made up of individuals, and 14.8% had someone living alone who was 65 years of age or older. The average household size was 2.36 and the average family size was 2.78.

The median age in the city was 47.3 years. 20.7% of residents were under the age of 18; 6.3% were between the ages of 18 and 24; 21.6% were from 25 to 44; 32% were from 45 to 64; and 19.4% were 65 years of age or older. The gender makeup of the city was 50.2% male and 49.8% female.

=== 2000 census ===
As of the census of 2000, there were 368 people, 151 households, and 106 families residing in the city. The population density was 893.0 inhabitants per square mile (344.8/km^{2}). There were 164 housing units at an average density of 398.0 per square mile (153.7/km^{2}). The racial makeup of the city was 98.64% White, 0.54% African American, 0.27% Asian, 0.27% from other races, and 0.27% from two or more races. Hispanic or Latino of any race were 0.82% of the population.

There were 151 households, out of which 31.1% had children under the age of 18 living with them, 55.0% were married couples living together, 9.9% had a female householder with no husband present, and 29.8% were non-families. 27.2% of all households were made up of individuals, and 14.6% had someone living alone who was 65 years of age or older. The average household size was 2.44 and the average family size was 2.89.

In the city, the population was spread out, with 28.5% under the age of 18, 8.7% from 18 to 24, 23.6% from 25 to 44, 22.8% from 45 to 64, and 16.3% who were 65 years of age or older. The median age was 38 years. For every 100 females, there were 91.7 males. For every 100 females age 18 and over, there were 92.0 males.

The median income for a household in the city was $25,625, and the median income for a family was $32,917. Males had a median income of $26,607 versus $19,250 for females. The per capita income for the city was $13,017. About 8.4% of families and 9.2% of the population were below the poverty line, including 8.6% of those under age 18 and none of those age 65 or over.

== Schools ==
The River Valley Community School District operates public schools serving the community. It was established on July 1, 1996 by the merger of the Eastwood Community School District and the Willow Community School District.

Quimby once had its own school district, its mascot known as "Peacocks," but financial pressure and dwindling enrollment forced the school to combine with nearby Washta school district in the early-1960s to create Willow Community School District, the mascot being the T-Birds. In the early 1990s, similar factors led to the merger of Willow and nearby Eastwood School district to form River Valley School District, with the mascot of the Wolverines. The district encompasses the towns of Quimby, Washta, Cushing, and Correctionville. Although Quimby is the second-largest, it does not house a portion of the school's classes.

Quimby maintained a school building, which housed River Valley Middle School classes until the building, constructed in 1921, became too expensive to keep up to code. The building was sold to a local resident, Tim Tapper, who held the property for several years before selling it to a private developer who demolished the building.

== Recreation ==
Quimby boasts a nine-hole golf course, a rarity for towns in the area of relative size.
